= The Best of Mountain =

Greatest hits album by Mountain
- Released: February 1973
- Recorded: 1970–1971, The Record Plant, NYC
- Genre: Hard rock
- Length: 39:30 (original); 53:27 (remaster)
- Label: Columbia/Windfall Sony
- Producer: Felix Pappalardi; Bob Irwin (reissue)

Mountain chronology
| Mountain Live: The Road Goes Ever On (1972) | The Best of Mountain (1973) | Twin Peaks (1974) |

Professional ratings
Review scores
| Source | Rating |
|---|---|
| AllMusic | 4.5/5 stars |
| Christgau's Record Guide | C+ |

The Best of Mountain is the only compilation album by American hard rock band Mountain. It consists of material recorded throughout 1970-1971, culled from their first three LPs. On 15 April 2003, the album was remastered and reissued in an expanded edition with new liner notes and four bonus tracks, two of which are taken from Leslie West's first solo album, 1969's Felix Pappalardi-produced Mountain, the project which eventually led to the formation of the band.

== Track listing ==
=== Side 1 ===
1. "Never in My Life" (Leslie West, Felix Pappalardi, Gail Collins, Corky Laing) – 3:53
2. "Taunta (Sammy's Tune)" (Felix Pappalardi) – 1:00
3. "Nantucket Sleighride (to Owen Coffin)" (Felix Pappalardi, Gail Collins) – 5:55
4. "Roll Over Beethoven" (Chuck Berry) – 2:58
5. "For Yasgur's Farm" (George Gardos, Corky Laing, Felix Pappalardi, Gail Collins, Gary Ship, David Rea) – 3:23
6. "The Animal Trainer and the Toad" (Leslie West, Sue Palmer) – 3:29

=== Side 2 ===
1. "Mississippi Queen" (Leslie West, Corky Laing, Felix Pappalardi, David Rea) – 2:32
2. "King's Chorale" (Felix Pappalardi) – 1:04
3. "Boys in the Band" (Felix Pappalardi, Gail Collins) – 3:43
4. "Don't Look Around" (Leslie West, Sue Palmer, Felix Pappalardi, Gail Collins) – 3:47
5. "Theme for an Imaginary Western" (Jack Bruce, Pete Brown) – 5:07
6. "Crossroader" (Felix Pappalardi, Gail Collins) – 4:53

=== 2003 Reissue Bonus Tracks ===
1. "Long Red" (Leslie West, Felix Pappalardi, John Ventura, Norman Landsberg) – 3:17
2. "Dreams of Milk and Honey" (Leslie West, Felix Pappalardi, John Ventura, Norman Landsberg) – 3:36
3. "Silver Paper" (Leslie West, Felix Pappalardi, Gail Collins, George Gardos, Steve Knight, Corky Laing) – 3:19
4. "Travelin' in the Dark (to E.M.P.)" (Felix Pappalardi, Gail Collins) – 4:25

== Personnel ==
- Leslie West – guitar, vocals
- Felix Pappalardi – bass, vocals, production
- Steve Knight – keyboards
- Corky Laing – drums, percussion

Additional personnel

- Bud Prager – executive producer
- Bob d'Orleans – recording engineer
- Ed Lee – art direction
- Gail Collins – photography

== Charts ==
| Chart (1971) | Peak position |
|---|---|
| Australian Albums (Kent Music Report) | 62 |
| US Billboard 200 | 72 |

== Certifications ==
| Region | Certification | Certified units/sales |
|---|---|---|
| United States (RIAA) | Gold | 500,000^{^} |
^{^} Shipments figures based on certification alone.
