= For Yasgur's Farm =

Single by Mountain

from the album Climbing!
- B-side: "To My Friend"
- Released: August 1970
- Recorded: 1969–1970
- Genre: Acid rock
- Length: 3:23
- Label: Windfall
- Songwriters: Gail Collins, George Gardos, Corky Laing, Felix Pappalardi, David Rea, Gary Ship
- Producer: Felix Pappalardi

Mountain singles chronology
"Mississippi Queen" (1970)	"For Yasgur's Farm" (1970)	"The Animal Trainer and the Toad" (1971)

"For Yasgur's Farm" is a song by the American rock band Mountain. It was released as a single from Climbing!, their debut studio album, and peaked at No. 107 on the Billboard Bubbling Under Hot 100 chart in 1970. The song quickly became a staple of the band's live performances.

== Writing ==
The lyrics of the song were inspired by the group's performance on the Woodstock music festival. According to Pappalardi:

"It was written over a long period of time... We played Woodstock and because of the emotional impact it had on us, we sort of changed the words around to fit that occasion."

When the band performed the song on Woodstock, it didn't have a title, but when they recorded it for their debut album, they dedicated the song to Max Yasgur, the man who owned the land where Woodstock was held.

== Release ==
"For Yasgur's Farm" was first included on the band's debut studio album, Climbing!, which was released on March 7, 1970. The song was then released as the group's second single in August 1970, with "To My Friend", as the B-Side. The single peaked at No. 107 on the Billboard Bubbling Under Hot 100 chart.

== Critical reception ==
The song was received well by critics. AllMusic's Matthew Greenwald writes "Cast in a heavy, blues-rock rhythm, the song is delivered with a subtle yet extremely powerful atmosphere," and that "lyrically, the song essentially recounts the festival and the sense of buoyancy that filled the hearts of most of the artists and attendees." A Cash Box magazine reviewer writes "Considerably different from the group's "Mississippi Queen" hit, this new Mountain offering subdues its rhythmic drive for a more lyrical venture."

== Personnel ==
- Leslie West – guitars, vocals
- Felix Pappalardi - bass guitar, vocals
- Steve Knight - organ
- Corky Laing - drums
