= Leslie West Live! =

Live album by Leslie West
- Released: September 28, 1993
- Genre: Rock
- Length: 48:56
- Label: Blues Bureau International
- Producer: Leslie West, Paul Orofino

Leslie West chronology
Night of the Guitar- Live! (1989)	Leslie West Live! (1993)	Dodgin' The Dirt (1994)

Leslie West Live! is a live album by Leslie West, released on September 28, 1993. The album features a track from West's debut solo album, Mountain, four tracks recorded by Mountain and one by West, Bruce and Laing. Additionally, apart from the "Intro Guitar Solo", there are two previously unreleased tracks, Jimi Hendrix's "Voodoo Chile" and Don Nix's "Goin' Down".

Professional ratings
Review scores
Source	Rating
AllMusic	3.5/5 stars

== Track listing ==
No.	Title	Writer(s)	Length
1.	"Intro Guitar Solo"	Leslie West	1:34
2.	"Never in My Life"	Leslie West, Corky Laing, Felix Pappalardi, Gail Collins	5:53
3.	"Theme for an Imaginary Western"	Pete Brown, Jack Bruce	6:50
4.	"Third Degree"	Willie Dixon	7:46
5.	"Voodoo Chile"	Jimi Hendrix	6:58
6.	"Goin' Down"	Don Nix	4:46
7.	"Baby I'm Down"	Felix Pappalardi, Gail Collins	1:36
8.	"Nantucket Sleighride"	Felix Pappalardi, Gail Collins	7:31
9.	"Mississippi Queen"	Leslie West, Corky Laing, Felix Pappalardi, David Rea	6:02

== Personnel ==
- Leslie West – vocals, guitar
- Richie Scarlet – bass guitar
- Paul Beretta – drums
