= Flowers of Evil (Mountain album) =

1971 studio album / live album by Mountain

Studio album / Live album by Mountain
- Released: November 1971
- Recorded: September 1971 (studio); June 27, 1971 (live)
- Venues: Fillmore East, New York City
- Studios: Record Plant, New York City
- Genre: Hard rock
- Length: 50:36
- Label: Windfall
- Producer: Felix Pappalardi

Mountain chronology
Nantucket Sleighride (1971)	Flowers of Evil (1971)	Live: The Road Goes Ever On (1972)

Flowers of Evil is the third studio album and first live album by American hard rock band Mountain. The title track concerns drug abuse in Vietnam. The first side of the album includes new studio material, while the second consists of live material recorded on 27 June 1971 at the Fillmore East in New York City. It was released in November 1971 by Windfall. This was the band's only album to chart in Norway, where it peaked at #17; the highest chart position for this album internationally.

Professional ratings
Review scores
Source	Rating
AllMusic	3/5 stars
Christgau's Record Guide	C

== Release ==
Windfall Records released Flowers of Evil in November 1971. The album debuted at No. 58, and peaked at No. 35 on the Billboard 200 chart.

The album artwork was done by Gail Collins.

== Critical reception ==
AllMusic's William Ruhlmann writes that the album is "unmistakable evidence that Mountain had run their course."

== Track listing ==
=== Side 1: Studio ===
1. "Flowers of Evil" (West, Pappalardi, David Rea) – 4:53
2. "King's Chorale" (Pappalardi) – 1:04
3. "One Last Cold Kiss" (Pappalardi, Collins) – 3:51
4. "Crossroader" (Pappalardi, Collins) – 4:49
5. "Pride and Passion" (Pappalardi, Gail Collins Pappalardi) – 7:08

=== Side 2: Live ===
1. "Dream Sequence" (medley) – 25:03

- Guitar Solo (West) /
- Roll Over Beethoven (Chuck Berry) /
- Dreams of Milk and Honey (West, Pappalardi, John Ventura, Norman Landsberg) /
- Variations (West, Pappalardi, Laing, Steve Knight) /
- Swan Theme (Pappalardi, Collins)

2. "Mississippi Queen" (West, Pappalardi, Laing, Rea) – 3:48

== Personnel ==
- Leslie West – guitar, vocals
- Felix Pappalardi – bass, vocals, production
- Steve Knight – keyboards
- Corky Laing – drums, percussion

Additional personnel

- Bud Prager – executive producer
- Bob d'Orleans – recording engineer
- Judy Szekely – recording engineer
- Beverly Weinstein – art direction
- Gail Collins – artwork
- The Music Agency – graphics

== Charts ==
Chart (1971–1972)	Peak position
Australian Albums (Kent Music Report)	39
Canada Top Albums/CDs (RPM)	23
German Albums (Offizielle Top 100)	39
Norwegian Albums (VG-lista)	17
US Billboard 200	31
