= West, Bruce and Laing =

American band

West, Bruce & Laing
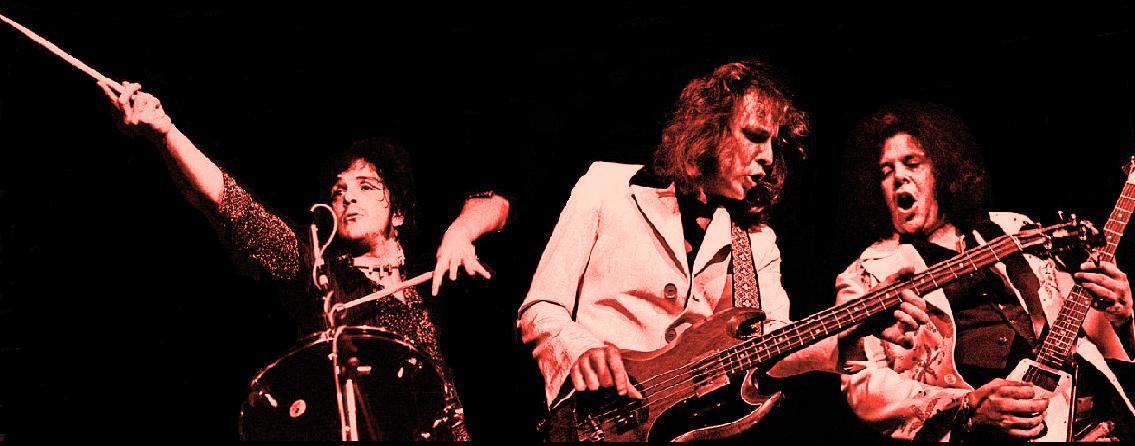
- L to R: Corky Laing, Jack Bruce and Leslie West, 1973

Background information
- Origin: London, England
- Genres: Rock, hard rock, blues rock
- Years active: 1972–1974, 2009
- Labels: Windfall, Columbia
- Past members: Leslie West; Jack Bruce; Corky Laing; Malcolm Bruce

West, Bruce and Laing (also known by the acronym WBL) were a Scottish–American–Canadian blues rock power trio super-group formed in 1972 by Leslie West (guitar and vocals; formerly of Mountain), Jack Bruce (bass, harmonica, keyboards and vocals; ex-Cream), and Corky Laing (drums and vocals; ex-Mountain). The band released two studio albums, Why Dontcha (1972) and Whatever Turns You On (1973), during their active tenure. Their disbanding was officially announced in early 1974 prior to the release of their third and last album, Live 'n' Kickin'.

In 2009 West and Laing briefly relaunched the band, with Jack Bruce's son Malcolm substituting for his father on bass. This incarnation of the band toured the UK and North America under the name 'West, Bruce Jr. and Laing'.

== Formation and record deal ==
The trio agreed to work together in London in January 1972 near the end of Mountain’s 1971–72 European tour supporting their album Flowers of Evil (1971), after Mountain’s bassist/vocalist/producer Felix Pappalardi announced he would leave the band at the tour’s end. (Pappalardi had, by late 1971, become addicted to heroin.) Jack Bruce knew Pappalardi well; Pappalardi had produced all but one of Cream's albums, and occasionally also performed with them in the studio. Subsequently, as Mountain's producer, Pappalardi would fashion his new band's sound after that of Cream, in particular scoring a 1970 hit with a cover version of Bruce’s song "Theme for an Imaginary Western" (from Bruce's 1969 album Songs for a Tailor, which Pappalardi produced). Bruce was thus viewed as a natural "replacement" for Pappalardi in West and Laing’s post-Mountain venture, with several record companies and management organizations expressing interest in signing the new band.

West and Laing’s manager Bud Prager, and Bruce’s manager Robert Stigwood, jockeyed for influence with WBL, with Prager ultimately establishing the more dominant position by brokering a US$1 million, three-album contract (7.5 million dollars in 2024) for the band with CBS/Columbia Records – a large artist signing for the day. As part of the deal, Prager arranged for WBL’s records to be distributed by CBS under his and Pappalardi's Windfall Records imprint, and for Mountain’s back catalog of albums to be reissued by CBS/Windfall. CBS Records' head at the time, Clive Davis, would be quoted as saying that the negotiations for WBL "showed record-company competition at its fiercest."

== Touring success and first album ==
Mostly leveraging material from Cream’s and Mountain’s back catalogs, West, Bruce & Laing began touring almost immediately after Mountain's disbanding, completing a 30-date North American tour even before their record deal with CBS was finalized. The band remained a hot live commodity throughout 1972; notably, a November 1972 WBL show at New York City's Radio City Music Hall sold out 6,000 seats within four hours.

Upon signing with CBS, WBL began work on their first album, Why Dontcha (November 1972). The album took longer than expected to complete, in part from inefficiency due to drug use by the band and their production team; upon its delivery to the label, CBS was dissatisfied with the album's quality and did not heavily promote it. In spite of this, however, Why Dontcha performed respectably in the marketplace, peaking at #26 on the Billboard album chart and staying on the chart for twenty weeks.

== Turmoil, second album and dissolution ==
WBL continued to tour North America and Europe extensively during late 1972 and early 1973 in support of Why Dontcha. However, the band's heavy drug use hurt their performances, and apparently at times even influenced their tour schedule. Corky Laing would later note:

[It was] a very, very dark time. New York meant coke, England meant heroin, because that’s where the best quality was. I had this Hayman drumkit made that was going to be shipped back to the States. This heroin connection of Jack's said that her business connections would pay me $250,000 if they could ship heroin back in the drums. They were all metal so nobody would have noticed the extra weight.

The band took a break from touring in the spring of 1973 to record a second studio album, Whatever Turns You On, in London. The sessions became contentious – they became "really nasty because of the smack" according to the album's co-producer Andy Johns – with West and Laing electing to return home to New York before mixdown was complete. The album was released in July 1973, peaking at #87 on the Billboard chart.

The Whatever Turns You On sessions would be the last time West, Bruce & Laing would work together. However, news of the band’s breakup would be publicly withheld until early 1974, with the band’s posthumous live album Live 'n' Kickin' released shortly thereafter.

== Post-breakup ==
Following the breakup of WBL, in late 1973 West and Laing briefly toured as Leslie West's Wild West Show. Following this, West reunited with Felix Pappalardi in a new line-up of Mountain. This band would work together through 1974, with Corky Laing ultimately joining as well. West and Laing would again reform Mountain in 1985 (without Pappalardi, who died in 1983), and sporadically played together in the band until 2010.

Jack Bruce resumed a solo career after WBL's demise; his later career highlights included collaborations with guitarist Robin Trower and jazz percussionist/producer Kip Hanrahan, as well as a 2005 reunion with Cream. Bruce died in 2014.

In 2009 West and Laing teamed up with Jack Bruce's son, Malcolm Bruce, and toured as West, Bruce Jr. and Laing. This group was advertised by some venues as a reformation of West, Bruce & Laing, with Malcolm described as "filling in" for his father on the tour.

Leslie West died in 2020, leaving Corky Laing as WBL's only surviving member.

== Discography ==
Date	Title	US Chart	Note
1972	Why Dontcha	26	
1973	Whatever Turns You On	87	
1974	Live 'n' Kickin'	165	Live Album
