= Nantucket Sleighride (album) =

1971 studio album by Mountain

Studio album by Mountain
- Released: January 1971
- Recorded: Late 1970
- Studios: Record Plant, New York City, New York
- Genre: Hard rock
- Length: 35:12
- Labels: Windfall (US); Island (UK)
- Producer: Felix Pappalardi

Mountain chronology
Climbing! (1970)	Nantucket Sleighride (1971)	Flowers of Evil (1971)

Singles from Nantucket Sleighride
- 1. "The Animal Trainer and the Toad" / "Tired Angels (to J.M.H.)" Released: 1971

Nantucket Sleighride is the second studio album by American hard rock band Mountain, released in January 1971 by Windfall Records in the US and by Island in the UK. It reached number 16 on the Billboard Hot 200 Album Chart in 1971.

The album included the song "Nantucket Sleighride (to Owen Coffin)," a song about a young seaman who was shot and eaten by his shipmates after their ship, the Nantucket whaler Essex, was sunk by a sperm whale. The album also features the song "The Animal Trainer and the Toad," their second and final song to make it onto the charts.

== Background and recording ==
Like their first album, this album was also recorded at the Record Plant in New York City. It was again produced by bassist Felix Pappalardi.

Felix Pappalardi was happy with the album, saying:

[Knight’s] treatment of the keyboard in "Nantucket Sleighride" itself, "Animal Trainer and the Toad" and things like that is so broad and his musicianship so good that it can evolve any time, he really can. Corky is in the process of arriving at a style. ... I think every album will be that kind of turning point for the band, and if it isn’t, I think it’s a waste of studio time. Nantucket is different from Climbing!, and the next is going to be different from all of those, and that’s what I mean by 'innovative.'

Leslie West recalled being hard-pressed during recording sessions. He was also frustrated with the way Gail Collins appeared to be too involved in the band. West later told Classic Rock:

I was living in London at The Inn On The Park on Hyde Park and picked up a copy. I was so fucking pissed off! Gail’s name was all over the cover. Felix and her called all the shots. I was just the lead guitarist and sometimes the lead singer, but she was listed in so many different places it was ridiculous. Even on the cover art she drew herself – just like on the first album she painted herself standing in front of a mountain. I hadn’t realised it before, but then it hit me and left a very bad taste in my mouth.

== Content ==
The name of the title track is a reference to a Nantucket sleighride, the dragging of a whaleboat by a harpooned whale. Owen Coffin, to whom the song is dedicated, was a young seaman on the Nantucket whaler Essex, which was rammed and sunk by a sperm whale in 1820. In the aftermath of the wreck, Coffin was shot and eaten by his shipmates. The story of the Essex was recorded by its First Mate Owen Chase, one of eight survivors, in his 1821 Narrative of the Most Extraordinary and Distressing Shipwreck of the Whale-Ship Essex. The instrumental break in the second half of the track uses the melody of the traditional Scottish song "The Parting Glass". The closing section of the song was used as the theme to the long-running British political television show Weekend World (1972–1988). A cover version of the song was recorded by British heavy metal band Quartz in 1980.

The song "Tired Angels (to J.M.H.)" was influenced by The Lord of the Rings, and dedicated to Jimi Hendrix, and "Travellin’ in the Dark (To E.M.P.)" was for Pappalardi's mother, Elia. "Taunta (Sammy's Tune)" was named after Pappalardi's pet poodle. "Don't Look Around" was featured on the soundtrack of Pineapple Express (2008). "The Animal Trainer and the Toad" and "Travellin’ in the Dark (To E.M.P.)" were both semi-autobiographical. "The Great Train Robbery" was written about the Great Train Robbery of 1963.

The bonus tracks on the 2004 edition include the Chuck Berry cover "Roll Over Beethoven" and the original song "Crossroader", which were released as the A- and B-sides of a promotional single in December 1971. The latter was later released on Flowers of Evil (1971). Live versions of both tracks appeared on subsequent live releases, such as Mountain Live: The Road Goes Ever On (1972) and Twin Peaks (1974).

== Release ==
Windfall Records released Nantucket Sleighride in January 1971. The album debuted at No. 80, and peaked at No. 16 on the Billboard 200 chart. The album was certified gold by the Recording Industry Association of America (RIAA) on May 26, 1971.

The album artwork was painted by Gail Collins.

"The Animal Trainer and the Toad" was the only single from the album. It was released with "Tired Angels (to J.M.H.)" as the flip side. It debuted at No. 100, and peaked at No. 76 on the Billboard Hot 100 chart.

== Critical reception ==
Nantucket Sleighride was met with much more mixed reviews compared to their debut album.

Professional ratings
Review scores
Source	Rating
AllMusic	3/5 stars
Billboard	(unrated)
Cash Box	(unrated)
The Music Box	3/5 stars

AllMusic's James Chrispell wrote "Not groundbreaking, but it is well worth listening to." John Metzger of The Music Box says that the album "didn’t live up to the promise of the band’s debut." He calls the album a "a solid effort," praising the songs "Don't Look Around," the title track and "The Animal Trainer and the Toad," but says that the rest of the album "rolled by rather unremarkably." Record World writes "The preceding Mountain albums, many will feel, packed more excitement on them, but that is not to say that there won't be much for the Leslie West-Felix Pappalardi-Corky Laing-Steve Knight fans to groove to."

== Track listing ==
Side one
No.	Title	Writer(s)	Length
1.	"Don't Look Around"	Leslie West, Sue Palmer, Felix Pappalardi, Gail Collins Pappalardi	3:42
2.	"Taunta (Sammy's Tune)"	Pappalardi	1:00
3.	"Nantucket Sleighride (to Owen Coffin)"	Pappalardi, Collins	5:49
4.	"You Can't Get Away"	West, Collins, Corky Laing	3:23
5.	"Tired Angels (to J.M.H.)"	Pappalardi, Collins	4:39

Side two
No.	Title	Writer(s)	Length
1.	"The Animal Trainer and the Toad"	West, Palmer	3:24
2.	"My Lady"	Laing, Pappalardi, Collins	4:31
3.	"Travellin' in the Dark (To E.M.P.)"	Pappalardi, Collins	4:21
4.	"The Great Train Robbery"	West, Laing, Pappalardi, Collins	5:43
Total length:			35:12

2004 CD release bonus tracks
No.	Title	Writer(s)	Length
10.	"Roll Over Beethoven"	Chuck Berry	2:59
11.	"Crossroader"	Pappalardi, Collins	4:50
12.	"Travellin' in the Dark (to E.M.P.)" (live)	Pappalardi, Collins	5:14

== Personnel ==
- Leslie West – guitar, vocals
- Felix Pappalardi – bass, vocals, production
- Steve Knight – keyboards
- Corky Laing – drums, percussion

Additional personnel

- Bud Prager – executive producer
- Bob d'Orleans – recording engineer
- Tom Cachetta – assistant engineer
- Dave Ragno – assistant engineer
- Beverly Weinstein – art direction
- Gail Collins – cover design, painting, photography, visual director, calligraphy
- Mick Brigden – calligraphy

== Charts ==
Chart (1971)	Peak position
Australian Albums (Kent Music Report)	38
Canada Top Albums/CDs (RPM)	17
UK Albums (Official Charts)	43
US Billboard 200	16

== Certifications ==
Region	Certification	Certified units/sales
New Zealand (RMNZ)	Gold	7,500^{^}
United States (RIAA)	Gold	500,000^{^}
^{^} Shipments figures based on certification alone.
