= Theme (album) =

Studio album by Leslie West
- Released: February 1988
- Studios: Millbrook Sound, Millbrook, New York
- Genres: Blues-rock, hard rock
- Length: 35:24
- Label: Passport
- Producers: Leslie West, Paul Orofino

Leslie West chronology
The Leslie West Band (1976)	Theme (1988)	Alligator (1989)

Theme is the fourth album by Leslie West, released in February 1988 by Passport Records. The album features bassist Jack Bruce and drummer Joe Franco. It was produced by Leslie West and Paul Orofino, and the liner notes were written by Howard Stern.

== Content ==
The album takes its title from the track "Theme for an Imaginary Western", which West re-recorded at the request of Howard Stern. It was first recorded by Jack Bruce on Songs for a Tailor and subsequently featured on Mountain's debut album Climbing!. The album also features live versions of Jimi Hendrix's "Red House", and Willie Dixon's “Spoonful”. The song "I’m Cryin'" features just Leslie West on guitar.

== Critical reception ==
Professional ratings
Review scores
Source	Rating
AllMusic	2/5 stars
Billboard	(unrated)

Cashbox reviewer Gary Starr writes that the album "has the look and sound of one recorded during the late 60’s," that the music is "stripped-down, basic blues oriented rock in the tradition of the great 60’s power-trios," and that the performances are "loose and relaxed." Steve Newton of The Georgia Straight describes "Theme for an Imaginary Western" as a "beautiful, inspiring tune, made even more so by the soulful vocals of Cream veteran Jack Bruce," and also highlights the song "I’m Cryin'."

== Track listing ==
Side one
No.	Title	Writer(s)	Length
1.	"Talk Dirty"	Charlie Karp	3:35
2.	"Motherload"	Leslie West, Joe Franco	3:10
3.	"Theme for an Imaginary Western"	Jack Bruce, Pete Brown	4:40
4.	"I'm Cryin'"	Leslie West	3:02
5.	"Red House"	Jimi Hendrix	4:58

Side two
No.	Title	Writer(s)	Length
1.	"Love is Forever"	Leslie West, Corky Laing	3:51
2.	"I Ate It"	Leslie West	3:00
3.	"Spoonful"	Willie Dixon	7:27
4.	"Love Me Tender"	Elvis Presley, Vera Matson	1:41
Total length:			35:24

== Personnel ==
- Leslie West — guitar, vocals
- Jack Bruce — bass, vocals
- Joe Franco — drums
- Alan St. Jon – keyboards, backing vocals

Technical

- Les Katz – cover
- Ed McCarthy – photography
