= Climbing! =

1970 studio album by Mountain

Studio album by Mountain
- Released: March 7, 1970
- Recorded: 1969–1970
- Studios: Record Plant, New York City
- Genres: Hard rock; blues rock
- Length: 32:38
- Label: Windfall
- Producer: Felix Pappalardi

Mountain chronology
Climbing! (1970)	Nantucket Sleighride (1971)

Singles from Climbing!
- 1. "Mississippi Queen" Released: February 1970; 2. "For Yasgur's Farm" Released: August 1970; 3. "Silver Paper" Released: 1971

Climbing! (also known as Mountain Climbing!) is the debut studio album by American hard rock band Mountain. The album was released on March 7, 1970, by Windfall Records. It peaked at No. 17 on the Billboard 200 chart, and spent 39 weeks on the chart.

The album included the group's best-known song, "Mississippi Queen", which became a hit, and "Never in My Life", which was regularly aired on contemporary FM radio. Both were sung by West, while Pappalardi supplied the vocal on another radio favorite, "Theme for an Imaginary Western".

The album was recorded at the Record Plant in New York City. Felix Pappalardi produced the album, while Bob d'Orleans engineered it.

== Background and release ==
In 1969, Leslie West recorded his debut solo album, titled Mountain, with Felix Pappalardi on bass and drummer Norman Smart. Smart was replaced by Corky Laing on drums and percussion, and keyboardist Steve Knight was added to form the classic Mountain lineup, with Pappalardi as producer.

Windfall Records released Climbing! on March 7, 1970. The album debuted at No. 186, and peaked at No. 17 on the Billboard 200 chart. The album was certified gold by the Recording Industry Association of America (RIAA) on August 28, 1970.

"Mississippi Queen" was the band's debut single, released in February 1970. The single peaked at No. 21 on the Billboard Hot 100 chart. "For Yasgur's Farm" was released as a single in August 1970. It peaked at No. 107 on the Billboard Bubbling Under Hot 100 chart. "Silver Paper" was also released as a single in July 1971, but it failed to chart.

== Music ==
Classic Rock Magazine said: "Its organic, hard-driving blues rock owed a significant debt to Cream, who were produced by Mountain bassist/vocalist Felix Pappalardi."

== Artwork ==
The album artwork was painted by Gail Collins. It depicts Collins standing in front of a mountain.

== Critical reception and legacy ==
Professional ratings
Review scores
Source	Rating
AllMusic	4.5/5 stars
Christgau's Record Guide	C+
Record World	4/4 stars
The Virgin Encyclopedia of Seventies Music	3/5 stars
The Music Box	4/5 stars
Daily Vault	A

Matthew Greenwald, in a review for AllMusic, gave the album four and a half out of five stars. In Christgau's Record Guide: Rock Albums of the Seventies (1981), Robert Christgau wrote:

We all know they're the original Cremora—what this makes clearer is that they're Jack Bruce's third of the jar. On "For Yasgur's Farm" Felix Pappalardi emulates JB's self-dramatizing vocal propriety as well as his bass lines, but when Leslie West runs an acoustic guitar solo from raga to flamenco without ever touching the blues you know he's not doing an Eric Clapton tribute. Can't fit the humongous "Mississippi Queen" into this theory, but I can tell you who wrote "Theme for an Imaginary Western": Jack Bruce and Pete Brown.

The album's opening track, "Mississippi Queen," has been covered by artists such as Ozzy Osbourne, Bachman-Turner Overdrive, Ted Nugent and W.A.S.P.

== Track listing ==
Side one
No.	Title	Writer(s)	Vocal(s)	Length
1.	"Mississippi Queen"	Leslie West, Corky Laing, Felix Pappalardi, David Rea	West	2:31
2.	"Theme for an Imaginary Western"	Pete Brown, Jack Bruce	Pappalardi	5:06
3.	"Never in My Life"	West, Laing, Pappalardi, Gail Collins	West	3:51
4.	"Silver Paper"	West, Collins, Laing, Pappalardi, Steve Knight, George Gardos	Pappalardi, West	3:19

Side two
No.	Title	Writer(s)	Vocal(s)	Length
1.	"For Yasgur's Farm"	Collins, Gardos, Laing, Pappalardi, Rea, Gary Ship	Pappalardi, West	3:23
2.	"To My Friend"	West	instrumental	3:38
3.	"The Laird"	Collins, Pappalardi	Pappalardi	4:39
4.	"Sittin' on a Rainbow"	West, Collins, Laing	West	2:23
5.	"Boys in the Band"	Collins, Pappalardi	Pappalardi, West	3:33
Total length:				32:38

On the 2003 Legacy Recordings CD, a live version of "For Yasgur's Farm" was added as a bonus track.

== Personnel ==
adapted from the albums liner notes, except noted

Mountain

- Leslie West – guitar; co-lead vocals (tracks 4, 5, 9), lead vocals (tracks 1, 3, 8)
- Felix Pappalardi - bass guitar (tracks 1-5, 8, 9), co-lead vocals (tracks 4, 5, 9), lead vocals (tracks 2, 7), guitar (tracks 7, 9), piano (tracks 1, 2, 9); Producer, musical director
- Corky Laing - drums (tracks 1-5, 8, 9), percussion (tracks 7, 9), Cowbell (tracks 1, 3, 8)
- Steve Knight - organ (tracks 2-5), mellotron (tracks 2, 9), handbells (track 4)

Technical

- Bob d’Orleans - Engineer
- Llyllianne Douma - assistant Engineer
- Bud Prager – executive production
- Gail Collins – cover artwork, photography
- Beverly Weinstein – art direction
- Mick Brigden - equipment
- Sheldon Rosen - equipment

== Charts ==
Chart (1970)	Peak position
Canada Top Albums/CDs (RPM)	19
US Billboard 200	17

== Certifications ==
Region	Certification	Certified units/sales
United States (RIAA)	Gold	500,000^{^}
^{^} Shipments figures based on certification alone.
