= Long Red =

1969 song performed by Leslie West

Song by Leslie West

from the album Mountain
- Released: July 1969
- Recorded: 1969
- Genre: Hard rock
- Length: 3:14
- Label: Windfall
- Songwriter(s): Leslie West; Felix Pappalardi; John Ventura; Norman Landsberg
- Producer(s): Felix Pappalardi

"Long Red" is a song recorded by Leslie West for his first solo album Mountain (1969). He performed it with his band Mountain at Woodstock in 1969, which was later included on Live: The Road Goes Ever On (1972). The drum break from this version is one of the most sampled in the history of hip hop music. In 2013, West re-recorded the song for his solo album, Still Climbing.

== Use in sampling ==
"Long Red"

Song by Mountain

from the album Live: The Road Goes Ever On
- Released: April 24, 1972
- Recorded: August 16, 1969
- Venue: Woodstock Festival, Bethel, New York
- Genre: Hard rock
- Length: 5:50
- Label: Windfall
- Songwriter(s): Leslie West; Felix Pappalardi; John Ventura; Norman Landsberg
- Producer(s): Felix Pappalardi

The 24-second drum intro from Mountain's performance of the song at Woodstock in 1969 has been sampled over 700 times, particularly the clips of West shouting "You out there?", "Louder!" and "Yeah!". West's energetic ad-libs and drummer N. D. Smart's improvised beat have been used by countless producers such as Pete Rock, Kanye West, Rick Rubin, and J Dilla, with Dilla creating the track "Stepson of the Clapper" off his 2006 album Donuts exclusively from samples of the intro.

"Long Red" was first sampled by either (Note: Marley Marl is often credited with handling production duties for "Eric B. is President", but Eric B. has disputed this in interviews.) Eric B. or Marley Marl on Eric B. & Rakim's 1986 debut track "Eric B. is President". Use of the sample seemed to grow exponentially after this, with it being used three times in 1986, 10 times in 1987, and 20 times in 1988.

When asked about the song's popularity in sampling in a 2014 interview with Glide Magazine, West said, "we have great publisher at Universal who gives the OK when people call for clearance to use it. So all these different groups sampling the song, why shouldn’t I do it? I wanted to do it more representative of the how I do it now. It’s much heavier now than when I wrote it back in 1969."

Pitchfork listed the sample as one of the "well-used building block [sic] that every sample-based producer should know their way around", mentioning it alongside other famous samples such as Malcolm McLaren and the World's Famous Supreme Team's "Buffalo Gals" and Beastie Boys' "The New Style".
