= Still Climbing (Leslie West album) =

Studio album by Leslie West
- Released: October 29, 2013
- Genre: Hard rock; blues rock
- Length: 47:00
- Label: Mascot
- Producer: Leslie West; Mike "Metal" Goldberg

Leslie West chronology
Unusual Suspects (2011)	Still Climbing (2013)	Soundcheck (2015)

Professional ratings
Review scores
Source	Rating
AllMusic	3.5/5 stars
Blues Rock Review	8/10

Still Climbing, also known as Still Climbing!, is the twelfth studio album by American hard rock artist Leslie West. It was released on October 29, 2013. Leslie West is a founding member of the band Mountain. The album reached #198 on the Billboard 200, making it West's third album (as well as the first since 1975) to make it on the chart (as a solo artist). The album featured performances by Jonny Lang, Dylan Rose, Dee Snider, Mark Tremonti, and Johnny Winter.

The title of the album is in reference to Mountain's first album, Climbing!

The track "Long Red" was first featured on West's debut solo album, Mountain, released in 1969. The rerecorded version on Still Climbing features his brother Larry West on bass. The brothers first recorded together as members of The Vagrants in the 1960s.

== Track listing ==
No.	Title	Writer(s)	Length
1.	"Dyin' Since the Day I Was Born" (featuring Mark Tremonti)	Jon Tiven, Leslie West	4:17
2.	"Busted, Disgusted or Dead" (featuring Johnny Winter)	Jon Tiven, Leslie West	3:23
3.	"Fade into You"	Matt Jenkins, Shane McAnally, Trevor Rosen	4:08
4.	"Not Over You at All"	Leslie West, Jennifer West-Weinstein	4:28
5.	"Tales of Woe"	Jon Tiven, Leslie West, Jennifer West-Weinstein	3:16
6.	"Feeling Good" (featuring Dee Snider)	Leslie Bricusse, Anthony Newley	4:13
7.	"Hatfield or McCoy"	Joseph Pizza, Leslie Weinstein, Jennifer West-Weinstein	3:49
8.	"When a Man Loves a Woman" (featuring Jonny Lang)	Calvin Lewis, Andrew Wright	5:10
9.	"Long Red"	Norman Landsberg, Felix Pappalardi, John Ellis Ventura, Leslie West	3:42
10.	"Don't Ever Let Me Go" (featuring Dylan Rose)	Leslie Weinstein, Jennifer West-Weinstein	3:52
11.	"Rev Jones Time"	Harold Arlen, E.Y. "Yip" Harburg	1:32
Total length:			47:00

== Chart performance ==
Chart (2018)	Peak position
US (Billboard 200)	198
US (Billboard Blues Albums)	1
US (Billboard Tastemakers)	3
US (Billboard Heatseekers)	5
US (Billboard Independent Albums)	34
