= Mountain (Leslie West album) =

1969 studio album by Leslie West

Studio album by Leslie West
- Released: July 1969
- Studio: Gotham Recording Studios, New York City
- Genre: Hard rock
- Length: 35:27
- Label: Windfall
- Producer: Felix Pappalardi

Leslie West chronology
Mountain (1969)	The Great Fatsby (1975)

Singles from Mountain
- 1. "Long Red" Released: 1969; 2. "Dreams of Milk and Honey" Released: 1969

Mountain is the debut studio album by American rock guitarist and vocalist Leslie West, released in July 1969 by Windfall Records. The album peaked at No. 72 on the Billboard 200 chart.

At least five of the album's tracks were played live by Mountain, which has given it the mistaken reputation of being the band's first album.

== Background ==
Mountain is West's first solo album, after several years as a member of the Vagrants. It was recorded with bassist and producer Felix Pappalardi. Soon after its release, West and Pappalardi formed the band Mountain (named after the album).

== Release ==
The album was released on LP in July 1969 by Windfall Records and in the UK on Bell Records. "Long Red" was released as a single from the album. The album debuted at No. 175, and peaked at No. 72 on the Billboard 200 chart.

On April 16, 1996, Columbia/Legacy reissued Mountain on CD.

== Reception ==
Professional ratings
Review scores
Source	Rating
AllMusic	4/5 stars
Classic Rock	3.5/5 stars
The Village Voice	B

Reviewing for The Village Voice in September of that year, Robert Christgau wrote: "With Felix Pappalardi singing and playing bass regularly this could be New York's third supergroup. (The Rascals and the Spoonful got there first.) The visual possibilities alone—with West, the enormous ex-Vagrant guitarist, set against the hyperactive Pappalardi, are fantastic. West plays good guitar and is a good roarer, and Pappalardi is not only first-rate on several instruments but has a wonderful singing voice, sweet and mellow. Unfortunately, he hadn't decided to join the group when this was recorded, and so participates only as bassist and producer. West alone can't quite carry it. More like early Cream than Blind Faith."

In a retrospective review, AllMusic's William Ruhlmann regarded it as a rock album "dominated by West's throaty roar of a voice and inventive blues-rock guitar playing", as well as "an auspicious debut, instantly establishing him as a guitar hero and setting the style of Mountain's subsequent recordings."

== Track listing ==
Side one
No.	Title	Writer(s)	Length
1.	"Blood of the Sun"	Leslie West, Felix Pappalardi, Gail Collins	2:35
2.	"Long Red"	West, Pappalardi, John Ventura, Norman Landsberg	3:14
3.	"Better Watch Out"	Pappalardi, Collins	2:47
4.	"Blind Man"	Collins, Pappalardi, West, Ventura	3:50
5.	"Baby, I'm Down"	Pappalardi, Collins	3:58

Side two
No.	Title	Writer(s)	Length
1.	"Dreams of Milk and Honey"	West, Pappalardi, Ventura, Landsberg	3:22
2.	"Storyteller Man"	West, Pappalardi, Ventura, Landsberg	3:04
3.	"This Wheel's on Fire"	Bob Dylan, Rick Danko	3:18
4.	"Look to the Wind"	West, Pappalardi, Ventura	2:43
5.	"Southbound Train"	West, Ventura, Landsberg	2:57
6.	"Because You Are My Friend"	West	3:10
Total length:			35:27

== Personnel ==
Musicians

- Leslie West – guitars, vocals
- Felix Pappalardi – bass, keyboards, production
- N.D. Smart – drums
- Norman Landsberg – Hammond organ

Additional personnel

- Bob D'Orleans – recording engineer
- Beverly Weinstein – art direction
- The Graffiteria/David Krieger – design
- Joel Brodsky – photography
