= Avalanche (Mountain album) =

Studio album by Mountain
- Released: July 1974
- Recorded: January–February 1974
- Genres: Hard rock, blues rock
- Length: 41:00
- Label: Columbia/Windfall
- Producer: Felix Pappalardi

Mountain chronology
Twin Peaks (1974)	Avalanche (1974)	Go for Your Life (1985)

Avalanche is the fourth studio album by American hard rock band Mountain, released in July 1974. It featured the return of drummer Corky Laing and was the band's only recording with second guitarist David Perry. It was their final album of the 1970s and the last to feature bassist/producer Felix Pappalardi. The band supported the album with a tour.

== Background and release ==
After the release of their first live album, Live: The Road Goes Ever On, the band disbanded. In 1973, the band got back together for a tour of Japan, which resulted in their second live album, Twin Peaks.

The band recorded Avalanche during January and February, and released it in July 1974. The album debuted at No. 127, and peaked at No. 102 on the Billboard 200 chart. They supported the album with a tour, after which the band disbanded again, only to get back together in October of that year to play more shows.

== Critical reception ==
Professional ratings
Review scores
Source	Rating
AllMusic	2/5 stars

James Chrispell of AllMusic gave the album two out of five stars, highlighting their cover of Jerry Lee Lewis' "Whole Lotta Shakin' Goin' On" and "You Better Believe It," but saying the rest of the album, "sounds like it could have been left buried under the Avalanche." A Cashbox reviewer says the album is a "contiguous whole that picks up the essence of Mountain and sends it down on your head like, well, an avalanche." A Billboard magazine reviewer wrote that the album is "maybe the best overall set the band has come up with yet."

== Track listing ==
Side one
No.	Title	Writer(s)	Length
1.	"Whole Lotta Shakin' Goin' On"	Dave Williams, Myriam S. Davidson	5:05
2.	"Sister Justice"	Felix Pappalardi, Gail Collins, Wyatt Day	3:58
3.	"Alisan"	Leslie West	4:41
4.	"Swamp Boy"	Pappalardi, Collins	2:54
5.	"(I Can't Get No) Satisfaction"	Mick Jagger, Keith Richards	5:14

Side two
No.	Title	Writer(s)	Length
1.	"Thumbsucker"	Pappalardi, Collins	3:20
2.	"You Better Believe It"	West, Corky Laing	5:47
3.	"I Love to See You Fly"	West, Pappalardi, Collins	3:46
4.	"Back Where I Belong"	West, Laing	2:56
5.	"Last of the Sunshine Days"	Pappalardi, Collins	3:47
Total length:			41:00

== Personnel ==
- Leslie West – guitar, vocals
- Felix Pappalardi – bass, vocals, keyboards, production
- David Perry – rhythm guitar
- Corky Laing – drums, percussion

Additional personnel

- Bud Prager – executive producer
- Bob d'Orleans – recording engineer
- George Lopez – recording engineer
- Gail Collins – artwork, photography
- Brad Joblin – photography

== Charts ==
Chart (1974)	Peak position
Canada Top Albums/CDs (RPM)	91
US Billboard 200	102
