= Live 'n' Kickin' (West, Bruce and Laing album) =

Live album by West, Bruce and Laing
- Released: April 1974
- Genre: Hard rock, blues rock
- Length: 37:29
- Label: Windfall/Columbia
- Producer: West, Bruce and Laing; Bob d'Orleans

West, Bruce and Laing chronology
Whatever Turns You On (1973)	Live 'n' Kickin' (1974)

Professional ratings
Review scores
Source	Rating
AllMusic	2/5 stars
Tom Hull	E+

Live 'n' Kickin' is a live album by the power trio West, Bruce and Laing, released in 1974. It was the band's third and final album, as their disbanding was announced shortly before its release.

The album is noteworthy in that three of its four songs were not released in studio versions by the band. Specifically:

- "Play with Fire" is a cover version of a song originally written and performed by The Rolling Stones, although West, Bruce and Laing's rendition uses the music for "Love is Worth the Blues," a song they previously wrote and recorded for their 1972 Why Dontcha debut album.
- "Politician" is a cover of a song Jack Bruce originally wrote and performed with his previous band Cream.
- "Powerhouse Sod" is a previously unreleased song featuring a bass guitar solo by Bruce. While credited to West, Bruce and Laing, Jack Bruce is probably the song's primary author, as the song had been played by Bruce with other bands prior to West, Bruce and Laing (for example, a live recording of it from 1971 is included on Jack Bruce's Spirit (Live at the BBC 1971–1978) boxed set).

Live 'n' Kickin' peaked at No. 165 on the Billboard U.S. album chart.

== Track listing ==
1. "Play with Fire" (Mick Jagger, Keith Richards, Brian Jones, Charlie Watts, Bill Wyman) – 13:26
2. "The Doctor" (Leslie West, Jack Bruce, Corky Laing, Sue Palmer) – 7:43
3. "Politician" (Bruce, Pete Brown) – 5:41
4. "Powerhouse Sod" (West, Bruce, Laing) – 10:39

== Personnel ==
- Leslie West – guitar, vocals
- Jack Bruce – bass, synthesizer, harmonica, vocals
- Corky Laing – drums
