= Go for Your Life (album) =

Studio album by Mountain
- Released: March 1985
- Studio: Criteria Recording Studios, Florida, Wizard Sound Studios, Westchester, New York
- Genre: Hard rock, blues rock
- Length: 33:43
- Label: Scotti Bros.
- Producer: Pete Solley

Mountain chronology
Avalanche (1974)	Go for Your Life (1985)	Man's World (1996)

Singles from Go for Your Life
- 1. "Hard Times" Released: 1985; 2. "Spark" Released: 1985

Go for Your Life is the fifth studio album by American hard rock band Mountain, released in March 1985. It was their first studio album since 1974's Avalanche.

== Background and release ==
It was the first Mountain album to not feature production or performance from Felix Pappalardi, who had been shot and killed by his wife Gail Collins in 1983. The album's closing track, "Little Bit of Insanity", was dedicated to Pappalardi's memory, and the album cover artwork was also designed with the fallen bassist/producer in mind. "What we wanted to do was give the feeling of someone looking up from their grave. And you can tell that's exactly what's going on with the image we used," said Leslie West in 2013.

The album features bassist Mark Clarke, who had been a member of Uriah Heep and Colosseum, and was produced by Pete Solley, who had worked with a diverse range of artists including The Rolling Stones, Oingo Boingo and The Allman Brothers Band. The music video for "Hard Times" featured professional wrestler Jesse "The Body" Ventura.

Scotti Brothers Records released Go for Your Life in March 1985. The album debuted at No. 179, and peaked at No. 166 on the Billboard 200 chart. "Hard Times" was released as a single, and a music video was made for it.

== Track listing ==
All tracks are written by Leslie West and Corky Laing, except "Hard Times" co-written with Bud Prager.

Side one
No.	Title	Length
1.	"Hard Times"	4:24
2.	"Spark"	3:43
3.	"She Loves Her Rock (And She Loves It Hard)"	3:43
4.	"Bardot Damage"	4:03

Side two
No.	Title	Length
1.	"Shimmy on the Footlights"	4:22
2.	"I Love Young Girls"	3:11
3.	"Makin' It in Your Car"	3:07
4.	"Babe in the Woods"	4:40
5.	"Little Bit of Insanity"	2:30
Total length:		33:43

== Personnel ==
- Leslie West – guitar, vocals
- Mark Clarke – bass
- Corky Laing – drums

with:

- Ian Hunter – sequencing on "Hard Times"
- Eric Johnson – synthesizer on "Spark"
- Miller Anderson – slide guitar on "Makin' It in Your Car"
- Chuck Kirkpatrick – background vocals

Additional personnel

- Bud Prager – recording director
- Pete Solley – engineer (Criteria)
- Jim Sessody – assistant engineer (Criteria)
- Mike Scott – engineer (Wizard)
- Gary Lyons – engineer (Wizard)
- Doug MacDonald – assistant engineer (Wizard)
- Mike Fuller – mastering
- Lane/Donald – art direction
- Barry Jackson – illustration

== Charts ==
Chart (1985)	Peak position
US Billboard 200	166
