= Cork (band) =

Cork is a rock duo/supergroup consisting of Eric Schenkman (formerly of the Spin Doctors) and Corky Laing (formerly of Mountain). Though not an official member, the duo have worked closely with Noel Redding (formerly of The Jimi Hendrix Experience), who has both toured with and recorded with Cork. The group has released two albums, 1999's Speed of Thought and 2003's Out There.

Songs from the Cork albums Speed of Thought and Out There were used in the documentary film Liberty Village - Somewhere in Heaven. Corky Laing is a resident of Toronto's Liberty Village and was interviewed in the film.
