= Theme for an Imaginary Western =

Song by Jack Bruce

from the album Songs for a Tailor
- Released: 29 August 1969 (UK); 6 October 1969 (US)
- Recorded: April–May 1969
- Genre: Psychedelic rock; progressive rock
- Length: 3:30
- Label: Polydor (UK); Atco
- Songwriters: Jack Bruce, Pete Brown
- Producer: Felix Pappalardi

Official audio
- "Theme for an Imaginary Western" on YouTube

"Theme for an Imaginary Western" is a song written by Jack Bruce and Pete Brown. The song is also referred to as "Theme from an Imaginary Western". It has been performed by many artists, including Jack Bruce, Mountain, Leslie West, Colosseum and Greenslade.

== Background ==
"Theme for an Imaginary Western" originally appeared on Bruce's Songs for a Tailor album in 1969. The lyrics by Pete Brown are mentioned in Brown's autobiography White Rooms and Imaginary Westerns (ISBN 978-1906779207) as being in reference to Bruce's erstwhile bandmates Dick Heckstall-Smith and Graham Bond of The Graham Bond Organisation.

The following year, the song appeared on Mountain's Climbing! album. Mountain bassist/vocalist Felix Pappalardi, who sang the song with Mountain, had helped produce Bruce's album and brought the song to guitarist/vocalist Leslie West's attention for their album. Mountain performed the song at the Woodstock Festival in 1969; this version appeared on the Woodstock Two album.

In 1988, Bruce teamed up with Mountain guitarist Leslie West, and performed the song again on West's Theme album, which was named after the song. West also performed it on Leslie West Live! and The Howard Stern Show.

The song was covered by English jazz rock band Colosseum on their 1970 album Daughter of Time and by English prog rock band Greenslade on their 1974 album Spyglass Guest.
