= The Great Fatsby =

Studio album by Leslie West
- Released: March 1975
- Studios: Electric Lady, NYC
- Genres: Blues-rock, hard rock
- Length: 34:16
- Label: Phantom
- Producers: Leslie West, Bob D'Orleans

Leslie West chronology
Mountain (1969)	The Great Fatsby (1975)	The Leslie West Band (1976)

Singles from The Great Fatsby
- 1. "Don't Burn Me" / "E.S.P." Released: May 1975

The Great Fatsby is the second album by American rock guitarist, singer and songwriter Leslie West. It was released on Bud Prager's Phantom Records in March 1975 and distributed by RCA Records. The album features Mick Jagger on rhythm guitar.

Following the album's release, Leslie West formed "The Leslie West Band", with which he toured the United States.

== Content ==
The album features four original tracks alongside West's interpretation of six other songs: covers of tracks by Paul Kelly, the Animals, the Rolling Stones, Sharks, Tim Hardin and Free.

"Little Bit of Love" would be the first of four tracks by Free covered by Leslie West. Subsequently, he released "The Stealer" (on Alligator), "Walk in My Shadow" (on Got Blooze) and "Woman" (on Blue Me). "House of the Rising Sun" is a duet with Dana Valery.

== Release ==
The Great Fatsby was released in March 1975. The album debuted at No. 177 and peaked at No. 168 on the Billboard 200 chart. "Don't Burn Me" was released as a single with "E.S.P." as the B-Side.

== Reception ==
Professional ratings
Review scores
Source	Rating
AllMusic	3/5 stars
Billboard	(unrated)
Christgau's Record Guide	C+

A Cashbox reviewer wrote that West's "lightning guitar work and dynamic vocals carry this album to unbelievable listening heights." A Record World reviewer describes the album as "a heavy hunk o' funk."

AllMusic's Joe Viglione says the album "emerges as a unique look at an important rock & roll artist with some surprises tucked inside."

== Track listing ==
Side one
No.	Title	Writer(s)	Length
1.	"Don't Burn Me"	Paul Kelly	3:01
2.	"House of the Rising Sun"	Traditional; adapted and arranged by Leslie West	4:59
3.	"High Roller"	Corky Laing, Keith Richards, Leslie West, Mick Jagger, Sandra Palmer	4:17
4.	"I'm Gonna Love You Thru the Night"	Corky Laing, Leslie West	2:42
5.	"E.S.P."	Leslie West	2:46

Side two
No.	Title	Writer(s)	Length
1.	"Honky Tonk Women"	Mick Jagger, Keith Richards	3:20
2.	"If I Still Had You"	Ira Stone, Maxine Stone, Leslie West	2:17
3.	"Doctor Love"	Andy Fraser	2:59
4.	"If I Were a Carpenter"	Tim Hardin	5:20
5.	"Little Bit of Love"	Andy Fraser, Paul Kossoff, Paul Rodgers, Simon Kirke	2:35
Total length:			34:16

== Personnel ==
- Leslie West – guitars, vocals, bass
- Mick Jagger – guitar on "High Roller"
- Joel Tepp – guitar, woodwind
- Howie Wyeth – piano, Mellotron
- Gary Wright – piano
- Marty Simon – piano
- Corky Laing – drums
- Nick Farrentella – drums
- Donald Kretmar – bass
- Ken Hinckle – bass
- "Buffalo" Bill Gelber – bass
- Frank Vicari – horns, woodwind
- Sredni Vollmer – harmonica
- Dana Valery – solo vocal, backing vocals
- Jay Traynor – backing vocals

Additional personnel

- Bud Prager – executive producer
- George Lopez – engineer
- Harry Sandler – photography
