= The New Vagrants =

The New Vagrants can refer to:

- The modern vagrants of the world.
- The current "reincarnation" of the 1960s rock group, The Vagrants
