= Whatever Turns You On =

Studio album by West, Bruce and Laing
- Released: June 1973
- Genre: Hard rock, blues rock
- Length: 36:35
- Label: Windfall/Columbia
- Producer: Andy Johns with West, Bruce and Laing

West, Bruce and Laing chronology
Why Dontcha (1972)	Whatever Turns You On (1973)	Live 'n' Kickin' (1974)

Professional ratings
Review scores
Source	Rating
AllMusic	4/5 stars

Whatever Turns You On is the second and final studio album by blues rock power trio/supergroup West, Bruce and Laing.

The album features a black-and-white comic strip on its front and back covers depicting the alleged "turn-ons" of the band's members — Leslie West's is food, Jack Bruce's is alcohol, and Corky Laing's is sex — as pursued by various avatars representing each of the three. The album's front cover drawing shows the three band members, each pictured with their alter-egos.

Although not the hit that West, Bruce and Laing's debut 1972 album Why Dontcha was, Whatever Turns You On was a moderate success, reaching #87 on the Billboard U.S. album chart.

== Track listing ==
All songs written by Leslie West, Jack Bruce and Corky Laing, except as noted.

=== Side one ===
1. "Backfire" (Bruce, Pete Brown, West, Laing) – 2:57
2. "Token" – 5:18
3. "Sifting Sand" – 3:07
4. "November Song" (Bruce, Brown, West, Laing) – 5:55

=== Side two ===
5. "Rock 'n' Roll Machine" – 3:53
6. "Scotch Crotch" (Bruce, Brown, West, Laing) – 3:17
7. "Slow Blues" – 5:08
8. "Dirty Shoes" – 2:23
9. "Like a Plate" (Bruce, Brown, West, Laing) – 4:37 (listed incorrectly as 3:07 on label)

== Personnel ==
West, Bruce and Laing

- Leslie West – guitar, lead vocals (1–3, 5, 7, 8)
- Jack Bruce – bass, lead vocals (2–4, 6–9), backing vocals, piano, harmonium, organ
- Corky Laing – drums, percussion

Technical

- Pacific Eye & Ear – album design
- Joe Petagno – cover illustration
