= Weekend World =

- Genre: Current affairs
- Created by: John Birt
- Presented by: Peter Jay (1972-1976); Brian Walden (1977-1986); Matthew Parris (1986-1988)
- Opening theme: Nantucket Sleighride
- Country of origin: United Kingdom
- Original language: English

Production
- Production company: London Weekend Television

Original release
- Network: ITV
- Release: 1972 – 1988

Weekend World is a British television political series, made by London Weekend Television (LWT) and broadcast from 1972 to 1988.

Created by John Birt, not long after he had joined LWT, the series was broadcast on the ITV network at midday on Sundays. Produced by Nick Elliott and David Elstein, it was originally modelled on CBS's 60 Minutes featuring several stories each week but gradually developed into a Sunday politics programme that featured a forensic interview with a major political figure. A news bulletin from ITN would be broadcast as part of the programme.

The original main presenter was Peter Jay from 1972, at the time an Economics Editor for The Times. The original reporter/presenter staff included Mary Holland, Anne Lapping, John Torode, and Julian Mounter, with researchers Yvonne Roberts, Monica Foot, Christopher Hitchens, Paul Flattery, Mike Englehard, Jane Hewland and Julian Norridge. The team were later joined by Peter Martin and David Cox.

Birt (now Lord Birt), later Director-General of the BBC, had the idea of combining directors who had no real current affairs background, but were known for their creative and innovative film/video skills, with strong reporters and presenters recruited from national newspapers. Weekend World was one of the first UK programmes to recognise the importance of the Watergate break-in, which ultimately led to the downfall of President Richard Nixon.

Peter Jay was followed as the series anchor by former Labour MP Brian Walden between 1977 and 1986, after Jay became Ambassador to the United States. Conservative MP Matthew Parris took over in 1986, resigning his seat, and presented the programme until the series ended in 1988.

A number of Walden's Weekend World interviews with Margaret Thatcher feature in the Channel 4 dramatisation Brian and Maggie.

The theme music used throughout the series run was the closing bars of "Nantucket Sleighride (To Owen Coffin)", originally written and recorded by the hard rock group Mountain.
