= Why Dontcha =

Studio album by West, Bruce and Laing
- Released: November 1972
- Genre: Hard rock, blues rock
- Length: 39.27
- Label: Windfall/Columbia
- Producer: Andy Johns, West, Bruce and Laing

West, Bruce and Laing chronology
Why Dontcha (1972)	Whatever Turns You On (1973)

Professional ratings
Review scores
Source	Rating
AllMusic	3/5 stars

Why Dontcha is the first studio album by power trio West, Bruce and Laing.

The album features "The Doctor", which received heavy FM radio airplay upon the album's release and became a signature song in live performance for the band. Other noteworthy tracks include "Out into the Fields", which Jack Bruce continued to perform in concert following West, Bruce and Laing's breakup (and which he re-recorded for his 2001 album Shadows in the Air), and "Love is Worth the Blues", a song loosely based on the chords and structure of The Rolling Stones' "Play with Fire".

Why Dontcha was West, Bruce and Laing's most successful album, reaching No. 26 on the Billboard U.S. album chart.

== Track listing ==
Side one

1. "Why Dontcha" (Leslie West, Jack Bruce, Corky Laing) – 3:02
  - Leslie West – guitar, vocal
  - Jack Bruce – bass
  - Corky Laing – drums
2. "Out into the Fields" (West, Bruce, Laing, Pete Brown) – 4:40
  - Leslie West – guitar
  - Jack Bruce – bass, lead and backing vocals, piano, harmonium, organ
  - Corky Laing – drums
3. "The Doctor" (West, Bruce, Laing, Sandra Palmer) – 4:30
  - Leslie West – guitar, vocal
  - Jack Bruce – bass
  - Corky Laing – drums
4. "Turn Me Over" (West, Bruce, Laing) – 2:43
  - Leslie West – slide guitar
  - Jack Bruce – acoustic bass, harmonica
  - Corky Laing – drums, vocal
5. "Third Degree" (Eddie Boyd, Willie Dixon) – 5:15 (shortened version on French LP – 4:42)
  - Credited to Boyd alone on original pressings of the album.
  - Leslie West – guitar
  - Jack Bruce – bass, vocal, piano
  - Corky Laing – drums

Side two

6. "Shake Ma Thing (Rollin' Jack)" (West, Bruce, Laing) – 3:14
  - Leslie West – guitar, lead vocal
  - Jack Bruce – bass, lead and backing vocals, piano
  - Corky Laing – drums
7. "While You Sleep" (West, Bruce, Laing) – 3:24
  - Leslie West – dobro, lead vocal, violin guitar
  - Jack Bruce – acoustic bass, backing vocals, piano
  - Corky Laing – rhythm guitar
8. "Pleasure" (West, Bruce, Laing, Brown) – 4:02
  - Leslie West – guitar
  - Jack Bruce – bass, vocal, piano
  - Corky Laing – drums
9. "Love Is Worth the Blues" (West, Bruce, Laing) – 4:11
  - Leslie West – guitar, vocal, violin guitar
  - Jack Bruce – bass
  - Corky Laing – drums
10. "Pollution Woman" (West, Bruce, Laing, Brown) – 4:26
  - Leslie West – electric and acoustic guitars
  - Jack Bruce – bass, lead and backing vocals, acoustic guitar, ARP synthesizer
  - Corky Laing – drums

== Personnel ==
West, Bruce and Laing

- Leslie West – vocals, producer, acoustic guitar, electric guitar, Dobro
- Jack Bruce – bass, organ, harmonium, harp, vocals, choir, chorus, producer, ARP synthesizer, acoustic guitar, harmonica, piano
- Corky Laing – drums, rhythm guitar, vocals, producer

Technical personnel

- Andy Johns – producer, engineer
- Dan Turbeville – assistant engineer
- Ed Lee – art direction, design, photography
