= Alligator (Leslie West album) =

Studio album by Leslie West
- Released: 1989
- Genre: Hard rock, heavy metal, blues rock
- Length: 29:52
- Label: I.R.S.
- Producer: Leslie West, Paul Orofino

Leslie West chronology
| Theme (1988) | Alligator (1989) | Night of the Guitar – Live! (1989) |

Alligator is an album by the American musician Leslie West, released in 1989 on I.R.S. Records. West supported the album by participating in the Guitar Speak and Night of the Guitars tours.

== Production ==
I.R.S. allowed West the freedom to make the album he wanted. Stanley Clarke played bass on "Whiskey" and "All of Me". Johnette Napolitano sang on the cover of Free's "The Stealer". "I Put a Spell on You" is a cover of the Screamin' Jay Hawkins song. The liner notes contain a recipe for alligator chili.

== Critical reception ==
Professional ratings
Review scores
| Source | Rating |
|---|---|
| AllMusic | 2.5/5 stars |

The Province deemed the album "as patchy as any of his solo LPs but it highlights his recent work with a Casio guitar synthesizer and his fluid, crying style—a style still rooted in rock and blues that is different from voguish speed merchants." The Chicago Sun-Times called it "an eclectic collection of songs that highlights West's deft electric guitar-playing skills and passion for unusual material."

The Daily Breeze opined that the "'Hall of the Mountain King/Theme from Exodus' medley, one of the album's most painful episodes, sounds like it was accidentally recorded during a rehearsal." The San Diego Union-Tribune noted that "instrumentals 'Waiting for the F Change', 'Whiskey', 'All of Me' and 'Alligator' promise much, but West seems to lose concentration, grow bored or something."

AllMusic wrote that West "plays some hot guitar here, of course, but then not as much as one might like, and he sings a lot here, too, perhaps more than one might like."

== Track listing ==
1. "Sea of Fire" (George Cintron) — 5:01
2. "Waiting for the F Change" (West) — 4:24
3. "Whiskey" (West) — 2:17
4. "Alligator" (West) — 3:23
5. "I Put a Spell on You" (Screamin' Jay Hawkins) — 4:12
6. "All of Me" (West) — 3:06
7. "The Stealer" (Andy Fraser, Paul Rodgers, Paul Kossoff) — 2:17
8. "Hall of the Mountain King / Theme from Exodus" (Edvard Grieg/Ernest Gold) — 3:09
9. "Dream Lover" (Bobby Darin) — 2:03

== Personnel ==
- Leslie West — guitar, bass guitar, vocals
- Steve Luongo — drums, percussion
- Jack Hotop — keyboards on "Alligator"
- Stanley Clarke — bass on "Whiskey" and "All of Me”
- Tony Miceli — keyboards on "Waiting for the F Change" and "I Put a Spell on You"
- Johnette Napolitano — vocals on "The Stealer"

Credits

- Producers — Leslie West and Paul Orofino
- Executive Producer — Miles Copeland III
- Engineers — Paul Orofino, Carl Davino and Judd Levison (Stanley Clarke overdubs at Devonshire Studios, N. Hollywood only)
- Mastering — Ron McMaster
- Direction — Stevo Glendinning
