= N. D. Smart =

American drummer (born 1947)

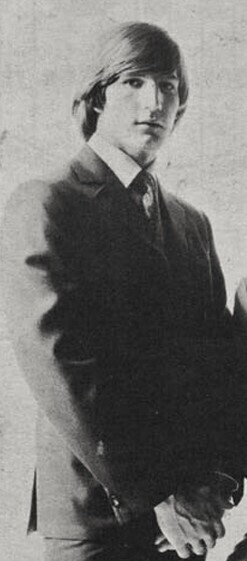
- Smart with the Remains in 1966

Background information
- Born: Norman Dow Smart II; September 29, 1947 (age 78); Dayton, Ohio, US
- Genres: Rock
- Instrument: Drums
- Formerly of: The Remains, Mountain, Great Speckled Bird

Norman Dow Smart II (born September 29, 1947), known simply as N.D. Smart, is an American drummer. He is best known for supporting The Beatles on their 1966 US tour as a member of The Remains, for being the original drummer for hard rock band Mountain in 1969 and performing with them at the Woodstock music festival, and for working with Todd Rundgren from the 1960s throughout to the 1980s.

== Early life ==
Norman D. Smart II was born in Dayton, Ohio, the only son of Norman Dow Smart Sr. (1920—2004) and Jacquelyn Frecka Smart (1922—2000). Smart's career started in the mid 1960s, playing in bands such as The Rich Kids, and then The Knights.

== Career ==
=== The Remains ===
In 1966, he moved from Ohio to New York, where he met producer Felix Pappalardi, who informed him that The Remains needed a drummer so they could support The Beatles on their 1966 US tour, as drummer Chip Damiani left the band, preferring to stay in Boston, Massachusetts. Smart, who was only seventeen at the time, joined the band for the tour, before they disbanded shortly after.

=== Bo Grumpus and Kangaroo ===
After the Remains disbanded, Smart moved back to Ohio, before he moved to Boston a year later. When in Boston, he formed The Bait Shop, who moved to New York and under Pappalardi's management, became Bo Grumpus. Smart left Bo Grumpus and was a member of the band Kangaroo, based in Washington, D.C., which released one album on MGM Records in 1968. Other members included John Hall (who went on to Orleans), Barbara Keith and Ted Speleos.

=== Mountain ===
He then joined the band Mountain, which included Pappalardi, in 1969 when it originally started out as frontman Leslie West's solo album project titled Mountain. He played with Mountain at Woodstock in August 1969. The live recording of "Long Red" from the Woodstock set was released in 1972 on Mountain Live: The Road Goes Ever On. The twenty-four second drum break by Smart has been sampled many times by hip hop artists over an estimated seven hundred times. Soon after Woodstock, Smart was replaced by Corky Laing in late 1969, reportedly due to him falling out with the other members of the band.

=== Later career ===
In 1969, he became a member of Ian and Sylvia's country rock group Great Speckled Bird. Their first album was produced by Todd Rundgren, with whom Smart would continue to work throughout the 1970s.

Smart, Jim Colegrove and Jeff Gutcheon formed the group Hungry Chuck in 1971. In 1973, Smart played and completed one tour with the Fallen Angels, Gram Parsons's group. Smart was the drummer for Hello People on their 1974 album The Handsome Devils, which was produced by Todd Rundgren.

Smart drummed for Rundgren into the 1980s. He worked in a reformed Hungry Chuck in the 1990s. He now occasionally performs in a local trio group.
