= The Leslie West Band =

Studio album by Leslie West
- Released: 1976
- Studio: Electric Lady Studios, NYC
- Genre: Blues rock, hard rock
- Length: 33:31
- Label: Phantom
- Producer: The Leslie West Band

Leslie West chronology
| The Great Fatsby (1975) | The Leslie West Band (1976) | Theme (1988) |

The Leslie West Band is the third album released by American rock guitarist Leslie West. The album, recorded at Electric Lady Studios in New York City, was released on Bud Prager's Phantom Records in 1976 and features Mick Jones, who formed Foreigner the following year, on guitar.

Professional ratings
Review scores
| Source | Rating |
|---|---|
| AllMusic | 3/5 stars |

== Track listing ==
All tracks composed by Leslie West, Corky Laing and Mick Jones; except where indicated.

Side one
| No. | Title | Writer(s) | Length |
|---|---|---|---|
| 1. | "Money (Whatcha Gonna Do)" | | 3:40 |
| 2. | "Dear Prudence" | John Lennon, Paul McCartney | 4:44 |
| 3. | "Get It Up (No Bass - Whatsoever)" | | 2:58 |
| 4. | "Singapore Sling" | Mick Jones | 1:52 |
| 5. | "By The River" | | 2:50 |

Side two
| No. | Title | Writer(s) | Length |
|---|---|---|---|
| 1. | "The Twister" | | 2:25 |
| 2. | "Setting Sun" | | 3:42 |
| 3. | "Sea of Heartache" | | 3:33 |
| 4. | "We'll Find a Way" | | 3:15 |
| 5. | "We Gotta Get out of This Place" | Barry Mann, Cynthia Weil | 4:42 |
| Total length: | | | 33:31 |

== Personnel ==
The Leslie West Band

- Leslie West – guitars, vocals
- Jon Deleon – drums
- Mick Jones – guitar
- Donald Kretmar – bass
- Joe Venti - bass
- Frank Vicari – horns
- Sredni Vollmer – harp
- Ken Ascher – piano
- "Buffalo" Bill Gelber – bass

with:

- Carl Hall – backing vocals
- Tasha Thomas – backing vocals
- Hilda Harris – backing vocals
- Sharon Redd – backing vocals

Additional personnel

- Bud Prager – executive producer
- Bob D'Orleans – engineer
- George Lopez – assistant engineer
- John Thompson – cover art
