= Songs for a Tailor =

1969 studio album by Jack Bruce

Studio album by Jack Bruce
- Released: 29 August 1969 (UK); 6 October 1969 (US)
- Recorded: April–May 1969
- Genre: Jazz rock
- Length: 31:32 (initial release); 43:48 (2003 CD reissue)
- Label: Polydor (UK); Atco (initial U.S. release, SD 33-306)
- Producer: Felix Pappalardi

Jack Bruce chronology
Songs for a Tailor (1969)	Things We Like (1970)

Songs for a Tailor is the 1969 debut solo album by the Scottish musician, composer and singer Jack Bruce, formerly of the supergroup Cream. Released on the Polydor label in Europe and on Atco Records in the U.S., Songs for a Tailor was the second solo album that Bruce recorded, though he did not release the first, Things We Like, for another year.

The album, which was titled in tribute to Cream's recently deceased clothing designer, displayed more of the musician's diverse influences than his compositions for Cream, though it did not chart as highly as his work with that band. Nevertheless, it was successful, reaching No. 6 on the UK Albums Chart and No. 55 on the Billboard "Pop Albums" chart.

While it has not been universally critically well-received, with a negative review by Rolling Stone on its first release, it is considered by many writers to be among Bruce's best albums. The literary lyrics by poet and songwriter Pete Brown have been particularly divisive, with one critic singling them out for praise while others have been more generally critical. Songs on the album include "Never Tell Your Mother She's Out of Tune" and "Theme for an Imaginary Western", which was covered famously by Mountain, and is featured in 2006's 1001 Songs: The Great Songs of All Time and the Artists, Stories and Secrets Behind Them. Songs for a Tailor was voted number 955 in Colin Larkin's All Time Top 1000 Albums 3rd Edition (2000).

== Background ==
After performing with various blues bands in his youth, Bruce rose to prominence in the rock world as a member of influential rock band Cream. After the group disbanded in 1969, Bruce began releasing solo material. Songs for a Tailor, released in September 1969, was Bruce's debut solo release, but chronologically his second solo album; Things We Like, his first solo recording, was released a year later.

The album was titled in tribute to Jeannie Franklyn ("Genie the Tailor"), a clothing designer who designed wardrobes for Cream and was also the girlfriend of Fairport Convention guitarist Richard Thompson (and, according to Bruce's 2010 biography Composing Himself, an ex-lover of Bruce). In 1969, Franklyn wrote Bruce a letter requesting that he "[s]ing some high notes for me," a letter that reached him on 14 May 1969, two days after she was killed in a motor vehicle accident in Fairport Convention's touring van. Bruce received the letter on his 26th birthday.

A blues and jazz musician by background who had studied Bach and Scottish folk music as a child, Bruce produced a debut effort that was musically diverse. Songs for a Tailor was described in Music Week on its 2003 reissue as "an impressive effort defying musical categorisation". Two of the songs—"Weird of Hermiston" and "The Clearout"—had originally been penned for possible inclusion on the 1967 Cream album Disraeli Gears, but were deemed too uncommercial by Cream's U.S. label Atlantic/Atco Records for release on that record. Bruce's dissatisfaction at this is noted in the liner notes for Cream's box set Those Were the Days: "I played them for Ahmet (Atlantic executive Ahmet Ertegun), Tommy (producer/engineer Tom Dowd), and whoever else was around ... they thought it was rubbish, just psychedelic hogwash." Demo versions of the two songs, recorded by Cream in early 1967, are included on Those Were the Days. However, the album was not simply a continuation of Bruce's material for Cream, but displayed more of the musician's diversity.

Pete Brown's lyrics for "Never Tell Your Mother She's Out of Tune" were inspired by a story told to him by Chris Spedding, who was the guitarist for Brown's band Pete Brown and his Battered Ornaments, and coincidentally played on most of the songs on Songs for a Tailor but not on "Never Tell Your Mother She's Out of Tune". Spedding's mother was a singer, and at one of her shows he complained that one of the string players was out of tune, which made his mother very upset.

== Recording ==
A majority of tracks on the album were centered around the trio of Jack Bruce, guitarist Chris Spedding, and drummer Jon Hiseman. According to Spedding, he and Hiseman were not provided with arrangements or direction on how to play; Bruce simply played them the piano part for each song and expected them to provide whatever accompaniment felt right without knowing what the vocals or other instrumental parts of the song were like. By contrast, the horn players on "Never Tell Your Mother She's Out of Tune", "The Ministry of Bag", and "Boston Ball Game 1967" were given detailed charts with arrangements written by Bruce himself, who cited the works of Otis Redding as an influence on the horn parts.

The guitarist on "Never Tell Your Mother She's Out of Tune", George Harrison, had a great deal of difficulty learning his part, with the horn players having to wait until late at night for him to finish so that they could record their performance.

Despite his major role in the songwriting for the album, Pete Brown reportedly never appeared in the studio during the recording sessions.

== Reception ==
Professional ratings
Review scores
Source	Rating
AllMusic	4/5 stars
Robert Christgau	B−
The Encyclopedia of Popular Music	5/5 stars

The album was generally successful, reaching No. 6 on the UK Albums Chart and No. 55 on the Billboard "Pop Albums" chart. It did not reach the sales levels of Bruce's work with Cream, the later albums of which consistently broke the top 10 of the Billboard "Pop Albums" charts before their dissolution, but, as of 2002, it was the most successful album of his solo career. Largely acclaimed, particularly in the UK, the album proved influential, described in 2001 by BBC as a "seminal" work. However, reviews were not universally positive, with critical opinion particularly divided on the album's lyrics, penned by long-term Bruce collaborator Pete Brown.

Ed Leimbacher, reviewing the album in 1969 for Rolling Stone, called Songs for a Tailor a "disappointment", panning it overall as "a patchwork affair lacking in any unifying thread, a baggy misfit made up of a shopworn miscellany of jazz riffs, rock underpinnings, chamber music strings, boringly baroque lyrics and a Bruce bass that [leaves] ... everything distinctly bottom heavy." However, later writings in the same magazine characterized it very differently. In 1971, Loyd Grossman termed it "[a] stunning recording with more than an ample amount of beautiful songs and excellent singing and playing". In 1975, he opined that "Bruce's first album, Songs for a Tailor, was so outstanding that his other albums almost always suffer by comparison." In 1989, Rolling Stone writer David Fricke, though noting that Bruce could "flirt with self-indulgence in the pursuit of the unconventional", described the artist's solo output as "highly underrated". In its review, AllMusic summarizes the album as "picture perfect in construction, performance, and presentation."

== Lyrics ==
Pete Brown's lyrics have been particularly divisive. Brown, a successful poet in the early 1960s, had been collaborating with Bruce for some time, writing lyrics for such Cream hits as "White Room" and "Sunshine of Your Love". The lyrics he wrote for Songs for a Tailor are typically poetic and heavily inspired by literary themes, with the Shakespearean "He the Richmond" and the horror-infused "Weird of Hermiston".

The first Rolling Stone review judged the lyrics as unsuccessful, dismissing them as "silly" and primarily burdened by an overabundance of literary references. 2006's 1001 Songs: The Great Songs of All Time and the Artists, Stories and Secrets Behind Them also disparaged the lyricist, stating that his "pretentious lyrics fail to connect", an inaccessibility that the book suggests combined with the lack of "instrumental fireworks" to prevent the album from reaching better commercial success. "The musicianship," that work says, particularly referencing "Bruce's soulful vocals", "remains timeless." But in later review of Bruce's work, Fricke regarded the songwriting more highly, questioning whether "anybody, beside Bruce and Brown, write songs like that anymore" and suggesting the cd version of the Bruce compilation Willpower specifically so that the lyrics could be read.

== Notable songs ==
"Theme for an Imaginary Western," which Allmusic describes as "Bruce's greatest hit that never charted," is perhaps the album's best-known song. According to Allmusic, "Theme" has a "fresh, rootsy sound" reminiscent of The Band's Music from Big Pink, derived from the combination of "Bruce's overdubbed piano and organ parts" and "the country-tinged lope of the rhythm section".1001 Songs profiles the number, describing it as an "elegant, masterfully-constructed piece of jazz-rock", though it suggests that Brown's lyrics for the song are "opaque at best". Lyricist Pete Brown later explained that the song was about the members of Bruce's famously wild pre-Cream band, The Graham Bond Organisation: "I saw them as a bunch of cowboys and pioneers. I was always amazed at the camaraderie between the early groups, but ever now and then you'd get explosive situations between them, just like in the Westerns." Leimbacher, though generally dismissive of the lyrics, found an exception for this song and "To Isengard", while The Guinness Encyclopedia of Popular Music finds the song "evocative", indicating that the album contains "[s]ome of" Bruce's "finest lyrics". The song was famously covered by Mountain, whose bassist-singer Felix Pappalardi had previously worked with Bruce as Cream's record producer, and also produced and appeared on Tailor. (One of Mountain's earliest performances of "Theme," at the August 1969 Woodstock Festival, predated the song's release on Songs for a Tailor by several weeks.) Colosseum (whose drummer Jon Hiseman played on Tailor's rendition of the song), and the progressive rock group Greenslade also recorded cover versions; the former also covered "Rope Ladder to the Moon."

In 1989 Fricke described "Never Tell Your Mother She's Out of Tune" as a "wacky, brassy" "enigmatic Bruce-Brown [delight]".

Bruce continued to refine and re-record the tracks from Songs for a Tailor throughout his career, both in live and studio albums. Only "To Isengard" has not been revisited.

== Track listing ==
All lyrics written by Peter Brown, music by Jack Bruce.

1. "Never Tell Your Mother She's Out of Tune" – 3:41
2. "Theme for an Imaginary Western" – 3:30
3. "Tickets to Water Falls" – 3:00
4. "Weird of Hermiston" – 2:24
5. "Rope Ladder to the Moon" – 2:54
6. "The Ministry of Bag" – 2:49
7. "He the Richmond" – 3:36
8. "Boston Ball Game 1967" – 1:45
9. "To Isengard" – 5:28
10. "The Clearout" – 2:35

=== 2003 Polydor/Universal CD bonus tracks ===
11. "The Ministry of Bag" (demo version) – 3:47
12. "Weird of Hermiston" (alternate mix) – 2:33
13. "The Clearout" (alternate mix) – 3:02
14. "The Ministry of Bag" (alternate mix) – 2:54

== Personnel ==
=== Performance ===
- Jack Bruce – lead and backing vocals, bass, organ, piano, acoustic guitar, cello
- Harry Beckett – trumpet
- George Harrison – guitar on "Never Tell Your Mother She's Out of Tune" (credited as L'Angelo Misterioso) (Note: Harrison's guitar part is deeply buried in the mix, and is uncredited in some versions of the album, including the original Polydor issue. However, secondary sources have confirmed that he did play on the track.)
- Dick Heckstall-Smith – tenor and soprano saxophones
- Jon Hiseman – drums (except on "Rope Ladder to the Moon" and "He the Richmond")
- Henry Lowther – trumpet
- John Marshall – drums on "Rope Ladder to the Moon" and "He the Richmond"
- John Mumford – trombone on "Boston Ball Game 1967"
- Felix Pappalardi – percussion on "He the Richmond", additional vocals and acoustic guitar on "To Isengard"
- Chris Spedding – electric guitar
- Art Themen – tenor and soprano saxophone

=== Production ===
- Jack Bruce – arranger
- Andy Johns – engineer
- Felix Pappalardi – producer
- Roger Phillips – photography
- John Tobler – liner notes

== Tour ==
Date	City	Country	Venue	Notes
24 January 1970	Coventry	United Kingdom	Lanchester Arts Festival	2 Shows
25 January 1970	London	United Kingdom	Lyceum Theatre	
30 January 1970	New York City	United States	Fillmore East	2 Shows
31 January 1970	New York City	United States	Fillmore East	2 Shows
6 February 1970	New Orleans	United States	The Warehouse	
7 February 1970	New Orleans	United States	The Warehouse	
9 February 1970	New Orleans	United States	The Warehouse	
13 February 1970	Detroit	United States	Eastown Theatre	
14 February 1970	Detroit	United States	Eastown Theatre	
20 February 1970	Chicago	United States	Kinetic Playground	
21 February 1970	Chicago	United States	Kinetic Playground	
22 February 1970	Philadelphia	United States	Electric Factory	2 Shows
25 February 1970	Houston	United States	Music Hall	
26 February 1970	San Francisco	United States	Fillmore West	
27 February 1970	San Francisco	United States	Winterland Ballroom	
28 February 1970	San Francisco	United States	Winterland Ballroom	
1 March 1970	San Francisco	United States	Fillmore West	

Tour Personnel

- Jack Bruce - bass, vocals
- Larry Coryell - guitar
- Mitch Mitchell - drums
- Mike Mandel - keyboards

Typical tour set list

1. "Politician"
2. "Weird of Hermiston/Tickets to Water Falls"
3. "HCKHH Blues"
4. "We're Going Wrong"
5. "The Clearout"
6. "Sunshine of Your Love"
7. "Smiles & Grins"
