= Mississippi Queen =

1970 single by Mountain

- West German picture sleeve

Single by Mountain

from the album Climbing!
- B-side: "The Laird"
- Released: February 1970
- Recorded: 1969–1970
- Genre: Hard rock; heavy metal; blues rock; Southern rock
- Length: 2:30
- Label: Windfall
- Songwriters: Leslie West; Corky Laing; Felix Pappalardi; David Rea
- Producer: Felix Pappalardi

Mountain singles chronology
"Mississippi Queen" (1970)	"For Yasgur's Farm" (1970)

"Mississippi Queen" is a song by the American rock band Mountain. Considered a rock classic, it was their most successful single, reaching number 21 in the Billboard Hot 100 in 1970. The song is included on the group's debut album and several live recordings have been issued.

== Composition and recording ==
Drummer Corky Laing explained that he had developed some of the lyrics and the drum part before joining the band. Laing had been playing a show with his previous group, Energy, when the power went out. Because his drums were acoustic he continued to play for over an hour to keep the audience dancing, namely an attractive Southern woman who was dancing in the emergency lights. He shouted out some of the lyrics, "Mississippi Queen, do you know what I mean?", accompanied with his signature cowbell the iconic track would later be known for. Later, when guitarist Leslie West was looking for lyrics for a guitar part he had written, Laing pulled out "The Queen" and the two worked out the song together; bassist/producer Felix Pappalardi and lyricist David Rea also received songwriting credits.

"Mississippi Queen" was recorded during the sessions for Mountain's 1970 debut album Climbing!, but without keyboard player Steve Knight. Pappalardi provided the piano part and during the recording, he insisted on numerous takes. Growing weary, Laing started using the cowbell to count off the song; Pappalardi liked it so much he left it in the mix, creating the song's recognizable intro. However, this story is disputed with guitarist Leslie West, stating:

There's this story on Wikipedia that we did all these takes. What a load of crap. We did maybe two takes. And the story goes that Corky got bored, so he started playing the cowbell. Also crap. The cowbell was always in there. The first time we played it, Felix said, 'Count the fuckin' song off!' Corky had a cowbell on his kit, and that's what he used to count it off. After that, we were in."

West stated in a Guitar Player magazine interview about the gear and production of the song that, "It's only one guitar track on the rhythm – a [Gibson] Les Paul TV Jr. into a 50-watt Marshall that went into a Sunn 12-inch cabinet." The guitar leads were later overdubbed.

== Legacy ==
"Mississippi Queen" appears at number 10 on a 1995 chronological list of the "50 Heaviest Riffs of All Time" by Guitar magazine editorial staff. Author Scott R. Benarde describes the song as "an enduring anthem" with a "guitar riff that sounded like a carnivore choking on dinner". The song is ranked 230th in The Top 500 Heavy Metal Songs of All Time by biographer Martin Popoff; it also appears at number 10 on the Ultimate Classic Rock 2011 list of the "Top 10 Southern Rock Songs". Spin magazine described it as "the cowbell jam to end all cowbell jams. Mountain are to the cowbell what Dostoevsky is to the Russian novel" in naming it number one on its 2004 list of the "Fifteen Greatest Cowbell Songs of All Time".

Ozzy Osbourne recorded "Mississippi Queen" for his 2005 album Under Cover, with a guest appearance by West on guitar. The song reached number 10 on the Billboard Mainstream Rock chart.

== Personnel ==
- Leslie West - vocals, guitars
- Felix Pappalardi - bass guitar, piano
- Corky Laing - drums, cowbell
