= Steve Knight (musician) =

American musician (1935–2013)

- Born: Stephen Sanders Knight; May 12, 1935; New York City, US
- Died: January 19, 2013 (aged 77) Riverdale, New York, US
- Genres: Rock; jazz; Middle Eastern jazz; folk
- Occupation: Musician
- Instruments: Keyboards; piano; bass guitar; trombone; guitar; tuba; banjo; organ; French horn
- Formerly of: The Devil's Anvil; Wings; Mountain; Red Onion Jazz Band; Taksim

Stephen Sanders Knight (May 12, 1935 – January 19, 2013) was an American musician best known as the keyboardist for the rock band Mountain from 1969 until his departure in 1972.

== Early life and education ==
Knight was born in New York to artist parents. From 1938–1950 his family lived in Woodstock, New York. In 1950, his father became a professor at Columbia University and moved the family to New York City. In 1952, Knight graduated from high school (New Lincoln School) and enrolled at Columbia later that year. He stayed at Columbia for most of the 1950s (1952–1959) studying art, music and psychology. He earned a B.S. degree majoring in psychology, and had one year of graduate work in psychology.

== Career ==
From 1959 to 1968, Knight recorded with or was a member of various bands including the Feenjon Group, the Peacemakers, Devil's Anvil and Wings (not McCartney's group).

=== Mountain ===
In 1969, producer/vocalist/bassist Felix Pappalardi organized Mountain. The initial line-up included Leslie West (guitar/vocals) and N.D. Smart (drums). Prior to release of Mountain's debut album, Climbing!, Pappalardi, who had known Knight from prior musical affiliations, added him to the line-up on keyboards. He performed with the band at Woodstock in August 1969. Later Corky Laing replaced Smart on drums. The band enjoyed a great deal of recording and touring success in the early 1970s including three gold albums, but called it quits in 1972.

Knight then returned to traditional jazz.

== Later life ==
For the next 25 years, Knight worked in specialty engineering (as a door engineer), and as a songwriter, author and part-time musician.

In the mid-1990s, Knight left New York City and returned to Woodstock. In November 1999, he was elected to a seat on the Woodstock Town Board. He was re-elected to a second term in 2003. In 2007 Knight chose not to seek a third four-year term, instead choosing to focus on his personal life including several music projects.

== Death ==
Knight died on January 19, 2013 in New York of complications from Parkinson's disease at the age of 77.
