= The Vagrants =

1960s American rock/soul band

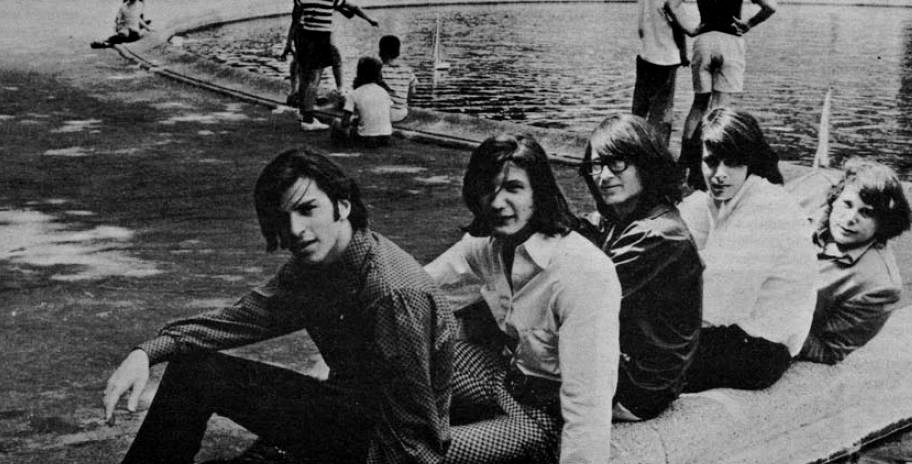
The band in 1966. Left to right: Jeremy Storch, Peter Sabatino, Larry West, Roger Mansour, Leslie West

The Vagrants were an American, Long Island-based rock and blue-eyed soul group from the 1960s. The group was composed of Peter Sabatino on vocals, harmonica, and tambourine, Leslie West on vocals and guitar, Larry West (Leslie's brother) on vocals and bass guitar, Jeremy Storch on organ, and Roger Mansour on drums.

== Rise to stardom ==
Formed in 1964, by the following year, the group had developed a professional press kit, had gained the interest of the semi-professional Southern Sound record label and soon released the single "Oh Those Eyes" b/w "You're Too Young". The single gained the attention of film directors Vince Scarza and Douglas Hickox, who were directing a movie titled Disk-O-Tek Holiday, which featured various music artists performing songs throughout the film. The clip that featured The Vagrants performing "Oh Those Eyes" is now considered a classic piece of mid-1960s history. The Vagrants were best known for their regular appearances at The Action House in Island Park, one of the premier rock clubs on Long Island in the late 1960s. The Vagrants often appeared on stage with The Doors, The Who, Vanilla Fudge, The Rascals, The Illusion and The Hassles (with Billy Joel on keyboards). The band's rock/cover of the theme from Exodus was often the highlight of each performance. While known for their powerful covers of "Gimme Some Lovin'" (The Spencer Davis Group), "Hold On I'm Comin'" (Sam and Dave), and other Motown hits, there are no known recordings of these songs in the limited Vagrants' catalogue.

The Vagrants then signed to the Vanguard label, something of a departure for them as their roster consisted mainly of folk and jazz artists. Vanguard released their first minor hit "I Can't Make a Friend", which is found on garage band compilations and is one of their recognizable early efforts. Felix Pappalardi, who later worked with Cream, The Youngbloods, and Jack Bruce, signed the group to Atco Records, then a subsidiary label of the Atlantic Recording Corporation, and their cover of Otis Redding's "Respect" became a hit on the East Coast in 1967. In 1969, guitarist Leslie West left to form the post-Cream power-band Mountain, with Felix Pappalardi on bass and vocals.

A compilation of all of the group's singles (except both sides of the "Oh Those Eyes" single) was issued on an Arista Records release titled The Great Lost Album in 1987, on which both Leslie and Larry West are credited by their birth names, Leslie and Larry Weinstein.

== The New Vagrants ==
In the 1990s, singer Peter Sabatino reformed the group with new members to create The "New" Vagrants. The lineup featured Tony Pinisi on organ, Eli Brown on bass guitar, Tom SanFilippo on guitar, and Joe Forgione (formerly of The Soul Survivors) on drums. The group has played many gigs throughout Long Island, especially at the OK Club and the Odyssey Club in Amityville, New York. The group started to record a new album called 21st Century Vagrants in 2002 at Electric Randyland Studios in Manhassett.

Drummer Joe Forgione died of a heart attack onstage at the Downtime Club, New York on October 20, 2003. On December 20, 2020, Leslie West suffered a heart attack at his house in Florida and died on December 22.

== Bibliography ==
- Roxon, Lillian: Lilian Roxon's Rock Encyclopedia (Grosset and Dunlop, Universal Library Edition, 1972) p. 503, ISBN 0-448-00255-8
