= Gail Collins Pappalardi =

American songwriter (1941–2013)

Gail Collins
- Born: Gail Collins; February 2, 1941
- Died: December 6, 2013 (aged 72); Ajijic, Jalisco, Mexico
- Other name: Gail Collins Pappalardi
- Occupations: Songwriter; record producer; visual artist
- Spouse: Felix Pappalardi

Gail Collins (February 2, 1941 – December 6, 2013) was an American songwriter, record producer, and visual artist. She was convicted of criminally negligent homicide in the 1983 killing of her husband Felix Pappalardi.

== Life and career ==
Collins married Felix Pappalardi on May 30, 1969. She came to prominence (as 'Miss Gail Collins') co-producing, with Pappalardi, the self-titled debut album by Energy, a group featuring Corky Laing. She also co-produced, with Pappalardi, the Felix Pappalardi and Creation album in 1976. Collins co-wrote Cream's "World of Pain" with her husband and "Strange Brew" with Pappalardi and Eric Clapton. Both songs are included on the album Disraeli Gears. She contributed lyrics to many Mountain songs. Her artwork appears on many album covers by Mountain, including Climbing!, Nantucket Sleighride, Flowers of Evil, Mountain Live: The Road Goes Ever On, Twin Peaks and Avalanche. She was associate producer on the 1978 album by Hot Tuna, Double Dose.

On April 17, 1983, Collins shot Felix Pappalardi once in the neck in the fifth-floor apartment he shared with her at 30 Waterside Plaza in New York City. He was pronounced dead at the scene, and Collins was charged with second-degree murder. Collins claimed that the killing was an accident. During the trial, it was revealed that the couple had an open marriage and that Collins had shot her husband after he had returned in the early morning from seeing his girlfriend. She was acquitted of second-degree murder and manslaughter but found guilty of criminally negligent homicide and sentenced to 16 months to 4 years in prison. On April 30, 1985, she was released on parole.

On December 6, 2013, Collins was found dead by her landlord in the Mexican village of Ajijic, Jalisco, a resort town with many American expatriate residents. She had been undergoing cancer treatments there. She was cremated. Her three cats were euthanized after her death and cremated so that their ashes could be mixed with hers.
