= Corky Laing =

Canadian rock drummer (born 1948)

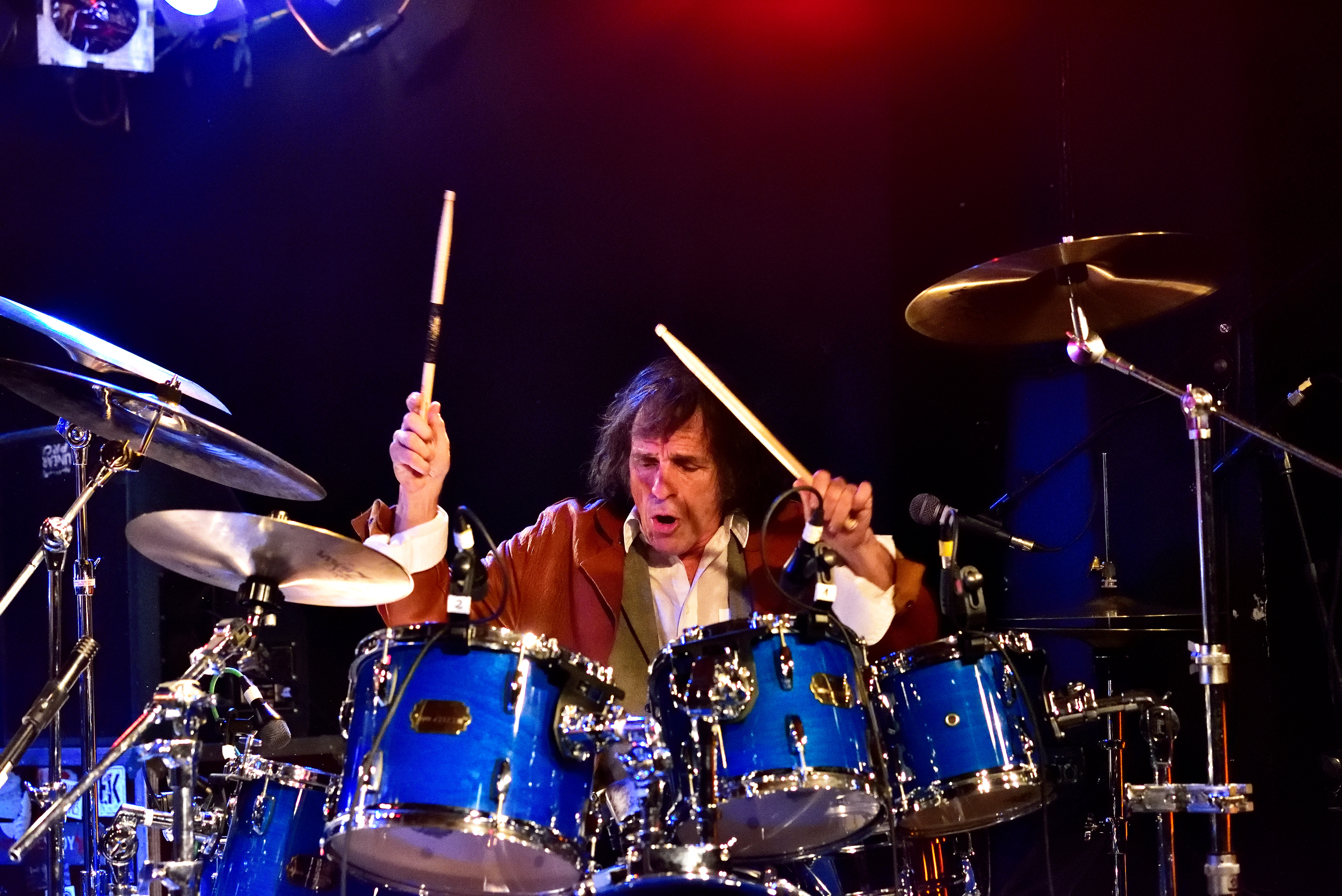
- Laing; February, 2016, Hamburg

Background information
- Born: Laurence Gordon Laing; January 26, 1948 (age 78); Montreal, Quebec, Canada
- Genres: Rock; hard rock; psychedelic rock; blues rock; heavy metal
- Occupation: Drummer
- Years active: 1965–present
- Labels: Elektra; Epic; Lightyear
- Member of: Cork
- Formerly of: Mountain; West, Bruce and Laing; Energy

Laurence Gordon "Corky" Laing (born January 26, 1948) is a Canadian rock drummer, best known as a longtime member of the pioneering American hard rock band Mountain. He and guitarist/vocalist Leslie West were the only members to appear on every studio album.

== 20th century ==
A native of Montreal, Quebec, Laing was the youngest in a family of five children. His eldest sister Carol was followed by triplet brothers, Jeffrey, Leslie, and Stephen, and then by Corky. According to Corky, his brothers called him "Gorky" because they could not pronounce his given name "Gordon". "Gorky" eventually morphed into Corky, a moniker which has remained with him throughout his career.

Getting his break playing drums for the vocal group The Ink Spots in 1961, he later played in a group called Energy, which was produced by Cream collaborator and Laing's future bandmate Felix Pappalardi. Laing left Energy in 1969 to replace drummer N.D. Smart in a hard rock outfit and heavy metal forerunner Mountain, who, with Laing at the drum kit, released three albums and the classic song "Mississippi Queen" between 1970 and 1971.

Laing spontaneously wrote most of "Mississippi Queen" while he was playing a show with his previous group, Energy. The overworked air-conditioning in the hot club coupled with the power draw of the equipment caused the power to go out. Because his drums were acoustic Laing continued to play for over an hour to keep the audience dancing, namely an attractive Southern woman who was dancing in the emergency lights. He shouted out some of the lyrics, "Mississippi Queen, do you know what I mean”, accompanied with his signature cowbell the iconic track would later become known for.

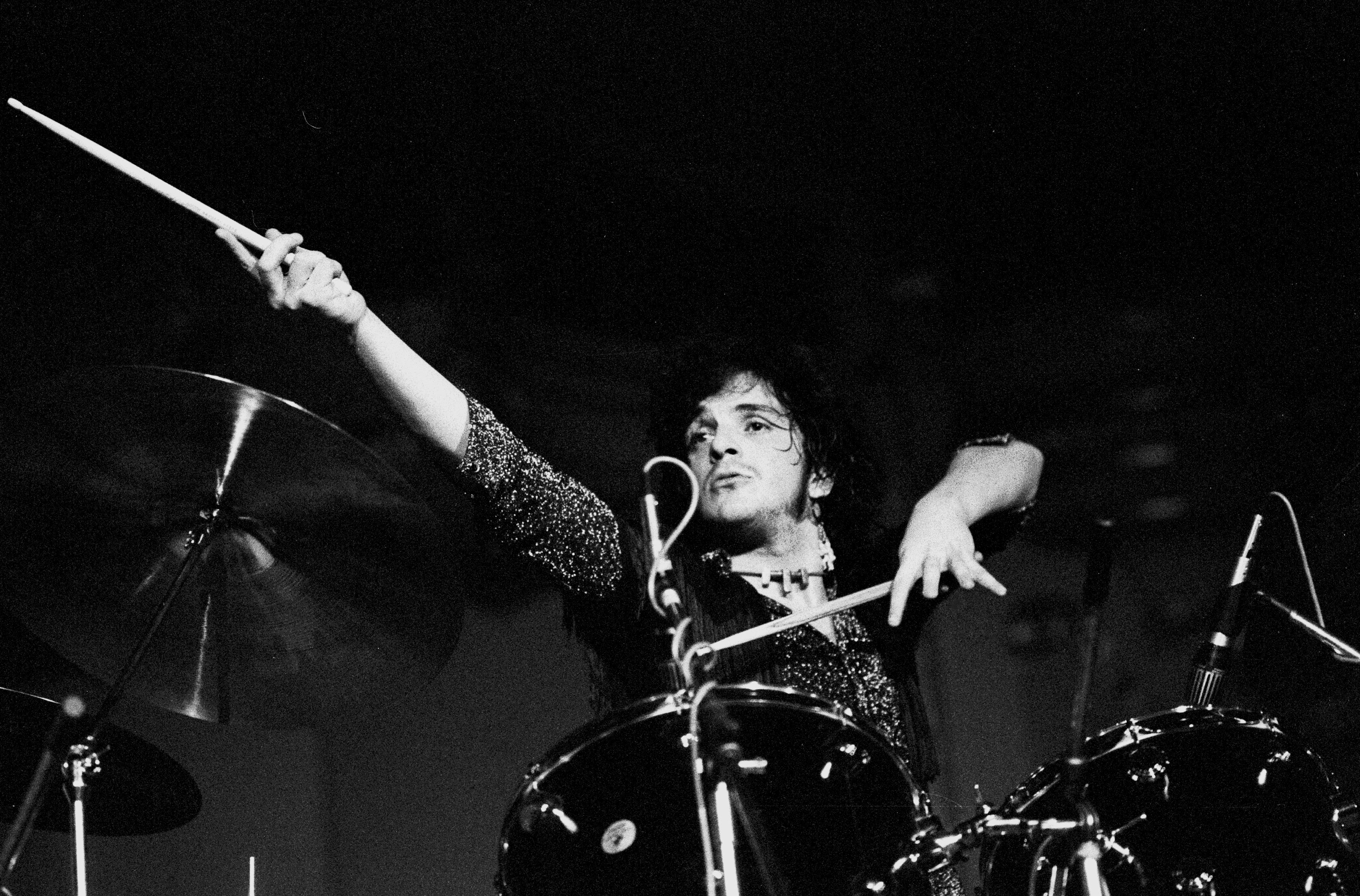
Laing, with West, Bruce and Laing, Musikhalle Hamburg, April 1973

After the band's first breakup the following year, Laing and Mountain bandmate Leslie West went on to form the blues-rock power trio West, Bruce and Laing with former Cream bassist/vocalist Jack Bruce. West, Bruce and Laing produced two studio albums and a live release before Mountain reformed without Laing in 1973 for a Japanese tour releasing the live Twin Peaks. Laing rejoined in 1974 recording Avalanche only for Mountain to break up again shortly after. The band would once again reconvene with guitarist Leslie West and Laing in 1985 for the release of Go For Your Life, and Laing has continued with them, most recently working on the band's 2007 Bob Dylan cover album Masters of War.

In late 1977 through 1978, he recorded an album with Felix Pappalardi, Ian Hunter and Mick Ronson. This album was not released at the time but was subsequently released in the UK in 1999 as "The Secret Sessions".

In addition to Mountain, he has recorded as the group Cork, with Spin Doctors guitarist/vocalist Eric Schenkman and Noel Redding, formerly bass guitarist of The Jimi Hendrix Experience. In late 1975, he played congas on several tracks on Bo Diddley's all-star album The 20th Anniversary of Rock 'n' Roll.

In 1991, he was featured on Men Without Hats' cover version of The Beatles' song "I Am the Walrus" on drums. This is available on the Sideways album.

== 21st century ==
In 2003, Laing and Leslie West authored Nantucket Sleighride and Other Mountain on-the-Road Stories, a chronicle of their time with Mountain in its heyday and their careers in the years following.

Laing lives in Toronto's historic Liberty Village and was interviewed for the 2006 documentary film, Liberty Village - Somewhere in Heaven. He contributed the music for the film from recordings of his band Cork.

In 2007, Laing recorded Stick It!, the audio version of his memoirs with Cory Bruyea in Oakville, Ontario. Laing's interest in education led him to attend the KoSA Music Camp in Vermont for the summer of 2012.

In 2019, he released his autobiography, Letters to Sarah.

Following the death of Leslie West in December 2020, Laing became the last surviving member of Mountain's classic lineup. In 2016, he formed Corky Laing's Mountain, with former Mountain bassist Richie Scarlet, now on lead guitar, and the bass slot was filled in by Mark Mikel, Joe Venti, or Bernt Ek.

== Collaborators ==
- Bo Diddley
- Mahogany Rush
- John Lennon
- Bobby Keys
- Ten Years After
- David Rea
- Mylon LeFevre
- Meat Loaf
- Mick Ronson

== Discography ==
=== Solo ===
- 1977 – Makin' It on the Street
- 2019 – Toledo Sessions
- 2022 — Finnish Sessions

=== With Mountain ===
==== Studio albums ====
- Climbing! (1970)
- Nantucket Sleighride (1971)
- Flowers of Evil (1971; partially live)
- Avalanche (1974)
- Go for Your Life (1985)
- Man's World (1996)
- Mystic Fire (2002)
- Masters of War (2007)

==== Live albums ====
- Mountain Live: The Road Goes Ever On (1972)
- Eruption (2004)

==== Compilation albums ====
- The Best of Mountain (1973)
- Over the Top (2001)

=== West, Bruce and Laing ===
- 1972 – Why Dontcha
- 1973 – Whatever Turns You On
- 1974 – Live 'n' Kickin'

=== With Leslie West ===
- 1975 – The Great Fatsby
- 1976 – The Leslie West Band
- 2005 – Guitarded

=== With Bartholomew plus III ===
- 1965 – "She's Mine" / "You're Not There"
- 1967 – "When I Fall in Love"

=== With Cork ===
- 1999 – Speed of THought
- 2003 – Out There

=== With Ian Hunter, Mick Ronson and Felix Pappalardi ===
- 1999 – The Secret Sessions

=== With The Mix ===
- 1980 – American Glue

=== With The Perfect Child ===
- 2013 – Playing God

=== As Corky Laing's Mountain ===
- 2017 – Live in Melle
- 2019 - Live At Howard's Club H

=== Guest appearances ===
- 1969 – David Rea – Maverick Child, drums
- 1971 – David Rea – By the Grace of God, drums
- 1972 – Bobby Keys – Bobby Keys, drums
- 1975 - John Lennon - Rock 'n' Roll, background vocals
- 1976 – Bo Diddley – The 20th Anniversary of Rock N' Roll, congas
- 1987 – Charlie Karp & the Name Droppers – Charlie Karp & the Name Droppers, percussion
- 1991 – Men Without Hats – Sideways, on "I Am the Walrus", drums

=== Other ===
- 2004: Jason Hartless Jr. – First Division
- 2012: Corky Laing and The Memory Thieves – House of Thieves
- 2018: Pompeii – The Secret Sessions
