= Mountain (band) =

American rock band

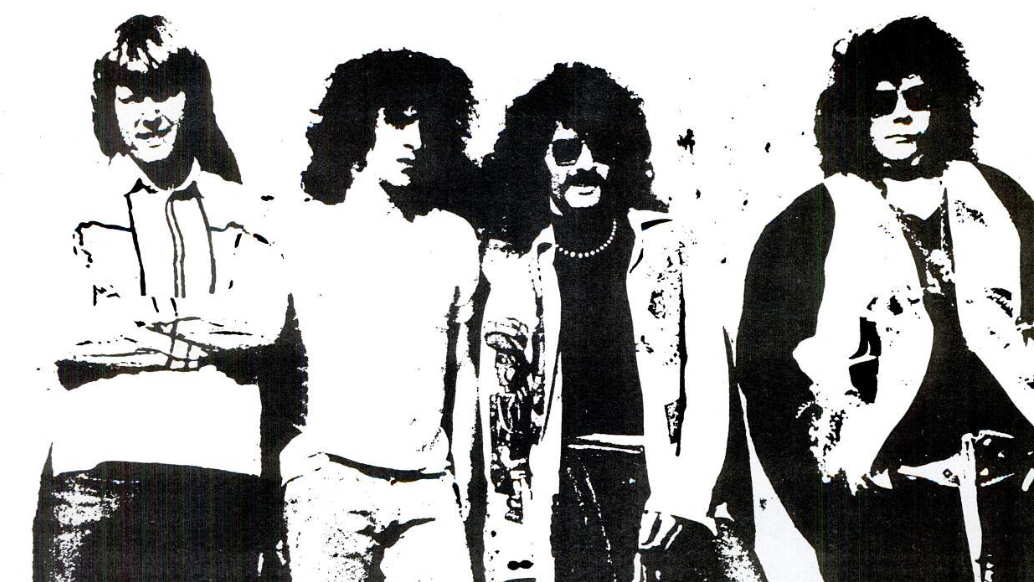
- Mountain in 1970

Background information
- Origin: Long Island, New York, U.S.
- Genres: Hard rock; blues rock; heavy metal; psychedelic rock (early)
- Years active: 1969–1974; 1981–1985; 1992–1998; 2001–2010
- Labels: Windfall; Columbia; Lightyear; Recall; Big Rack; Scotti Bros.
- Spinoffs: West, Bruce and Laing; Corky Laing's Mountain
- Past members: Leslie West; Corky Laing; Felix Pappalardi; Steve Knight; N. D. Smart; Bob Mann; Allan Schwartzberg; David Perry; Miller Anderson; Mark Clarke; Richie Scarlet; Randy Coven; Noel Redding; Rev Jones

Mountain was an American rock band formed on Long Island, New York, in 1969. Originally consisting of vocalist-guitarist Leslie West, bassist-vocalist Felix Pappalardi, keyboardist Steve Knight, and drummer N. D. Smart (soon replaced by Corky Laing), the group disbanded in 1972, but reunited on several occasions prior to West's death in 2020. They are best known for their 1970 smash hit song "Mississippi Queen", which remains a staple of classic rock radio, as well as the heavily sampled song "Long Red", and their performance at Woodstock Festival in 1969. Mountain is one of many bands commonly credited with influencing the development of heavy metal music during the 1970s. The group's musical style primarily consisted of hard rock, blues rock, and heavy metal.

The beginning of the live recording of their song "Long Red" has become one of the most sampled drum breaks in hip hop, sampled in over 700 songs by artists such as EPMD, Pete Rock & CL Smooth, A Tribe Called Quest, Nas, Kanye West, the Game, among many others. Songs using the sample include Jay-Z's "99 Problems" and Kanye West's "The Glory".

== History ==
=== 1969–1972 ===
In early 1969 Leslie West, formerly of the Long Island R&B band The Vagrants, put together a band, Leslie West Mountain, with Norman Landsberg (keyboards, bass) and Ken Janick (drums) and began playing gigs and recording demos. Right around this time, former Cream collaborator/producer Felix Pappalardi, who had previously produced the Vagrants, expressed an interest in producing West's work. West, previously disgruntled and unsatisfied with the lack of success in his first project, found Cream to be a great inspiration. He began to feel disillusioned with the R&B and blues scenes of the 1960s in which he had played. He envisioned a project that would take on a rawer and much harder style which he had begun to favor, with his newly developed guitar style inspired by hearing Cream's Eric Clapton.

Pappalardi rejected the demos by the West-Landsberg-Janick trio, but took to a suggestion that he play bass on West's solo album, Mountain. The album also featured Landsberg and former Remains drummer N.D. Smart. The album spotlighted West's raw vocals and melodic, bluesy guitar style, and Pappalardi's bass lines were prominent. According to West, when Pappalardi asked what would be next, West suggested the pair go on the road. Keyboardist Steve Knight (from Devil's Anvil, another of Pappalardi's productions) was added after Landsberg left to form another group, Hammer, with Janick.

Naming themselves "Mountain", after West's 1969 solo album, West, Pappalardi, Smart, and Knight played shows on the west coast before getting to play their third concert as a working band at the 1969 Woodstock Festival in Bethel, New York. Mountain was received enthusiastically by the festival audience but the band did not appear in the film of the event, nor was their performance included on volume 1 of the festival's live album. Their performances of "Blood of the Sun" (from West's album) and "Theme for an Imaginary Western" (a song they planned to record for Climbing! and written by former Cream bassist Jack Bruce) appeared on the second volume of Woodstock performances, Woodstock II, although neither of those "live" songs were recorded at Woodstock. The 40th Anniversary Edition of Woodstock on DVD and Blu-ray features filmed performances of "Beside The Sea" and "Southbound Train".

Soon after Woodstock, Smart was replaced by Canadian Laurence "Corky" Laing, who was the drummer on Climbing!, which was released in March 1970. It led off with what became the band's signature song, "Mississippi Queen", which reached No. 21 in the Billboard Hot 100, and was featured in the 1971 cult film Vanishing Point, while the album reached No. 17. Laing wrote most of the song spontaneously when his previous band, Energy, was playing a show and the power went out. Because his drums were acoustic Laing continued to play for over an hour to keep the audience dancing, namely an attractive Southern woman who was dancing in the emergency lights. He shouted out some of the lyrics, "Mississippi Queen, do you know what I mean?", accompanied with his signature cowbell the iconic track would later be known for.

Mountain began a hectic touring schedule in the middle of which they recorded a follow-up album, Nantucket Sleighride, released in January 1971. This album reached No. 16 but failed to yield a hit single. The title track was used in the UK as the theme to ITV's Sunday political program Weekend World. After these early releases the band continued to receive a certain measure of critical acclaim but never again achieved great commercial success.

After Nantucket Sleighride, the band produced Flowers of Evil (November 1971) consisting of one side of studio material and one live side, culled from a concert at New York's Fillmore East.

Mountain disbanded in February 1972 after a tour of the UK. West has since cited a combination of drug abuse within the band and Pappalardi's road weariness and burgeoning hearing impairment as primary factors. A live album, Mountain Live: The Road Goes Ever On, was issued in April 1972.

Pappalardi returned to studio work, while West and Laing formed West, Bruce and Laing with former Cream bassist Jack Bruce. Their first American performance was a Carnegie Hall concert, prompting a bidding war that Columbia Records won, and the new trio cut two studio albums and a live release over the next two years. After Bruce suddenly pulled out of the trio in 1973, West and Laing continued on briefly as Leslie West's Wild West Show, which also featured special guest Mitch Ryder plus NYC guitarist Peter Baron and bassist Tom Robb (formerly with Mylon LeFevre's band and later with the Marshall Tucker Band).

=== Post–1972 ===
By August 1973, West and Pappalardi had reformed Mountain with Allan Schwartzberg on drums and Bob Mann (ex-Dreams) on keyboards and guitar; the new lineup toured Japan and produced a double live album, Twin Peaks (February 1974), from the tour. The studio work Avalanche (July 1974), for which Laing returned to play drums and David Perry became the new second guitarist (from November 1973 to September 1974), would be Mountain's final album with Pappalardi as a participant; the group broke up again after playing a final show at Felt Forum in New York City on December 31, 1974.

On April 17, 1983 Gail Collins Pappalardi, Pappalardi's wife and songwriting partner (she had designed many of the band's album covers and wrote many of their lyrics), shot and killed Pappalardi, in the neck, in their fifth-floor East Side Manhattan apartment.

After pursuing separate musical paths for almost a decade, West and Laing reunited Mountain, recruiting Miller Anderson (ex-Savoy Brown & Keef Hartley) on bass in 1981. After Anderson had travel visa troubles, he was replaced in 1984 by Mark Clarke and the group recorded Go for Your Life (March 1985). This line up played at the Knebworth Fayre on June 22, 1985, alongside Mama's Boys, Blackfoot, Meat Loaf, Scorpions, Deep Purple, and others. Go For Your Life was dedicated to Pappalardi's memory. Shortly thereafter, the band performed with Triumph at the Prairie Capital Convention Center in Illinois.

Mountain went dormant again until 1992, when West and Laing teamed up once again and brought in Richie Scarlet (known for his solo work and collaborations with Ace Frehley) to round out the lineup that had a live appearance in The Dennis Miller Show. Scarlet was replaced with Randy Coven in 1993 and in 1994 there was a Mountain lineup that included West, Laing, Noel Redding and occasional special guest guitarist Elvin Bishop. By 1995, the 1984–85 lineup of West, Laing and Mark Clarke was back, and recorded Man's World in 1996. In 1998 things went quiet in the Mountain camp again until 2001. That year, with Scarlet back in the lineup, the band toured, then recorded Mystic Fire, released in 2002.

In 2003 West and Laing authored a book of recollections, Nantucket Sleighride and Other Mountain On-the-Road Stories, detailing their time with the band at its peak and their subsequent careers.

Mountain's video game debut came in 2007 on RedOctane's Guitar Hero III, featuring "Mississippi Queen" as a playable track. The song is also featured in the Harmonix video game Rock Band, although the version featured is a cover of the studio recording.

Their final album was 2007's Masters of War, featuring twelve Bob Dylan songs and a guest appearance from Ozzy Osbourne.

The band headed out on the road during October and November 2008 on a North American tour opening for Joe Satriani, and with former Michael Schenker Group member Rev Jones on bass. A review of the San Diego House of Blues date covered the Mountain set, including "Blowing in the Wind" from the Masters of War album, with enthusiasm. Of the Satriani set, the reviewer was also pleased with the blues influence he felt Mountain brought to the evening, and with West joining in on a Satriani-led closing "Stormy Monday" and "Going Down" blues jam.

Fellow Long Island native Howard Stern has called Mountain one of his favorite bands and has occasionally played their music on his show. Other Mountain fans include Eddie Van Halen, Randy Rhoads, John McLaughlin, Johnny Ramone, Clutch, Karma to Burn, comedian Dennis Miller, and John Frusciante (the Red Hot Chili Peppers track "Readymade" off 2006's Stadium Arcadium features a Mountain-influenced riff). Martin Barre, guitarist for Jethro Tull has stated in interviews that Leslie West was a direct influence on his playing.

Beastie Boys are also noted for their use of a brief sample of "Mississippi Queen" on the track "Lookin' Down the Barrel of a Gun" from their sample-heavy 1989 album, Paul's Boutique.

Mountain continued to perform occasionally with Leslie West, Corky Laing and Rev Jones. On June 20, 2011, West had his lower right leg amputated as a result of complications from diabetes. Following the surgery, West performed and recorded under his own name; his concerts featured many Mountain songs. Corky Laing formed a new project, Corky Laing Plays Mountain, in 2015. This project included bassist/vocalist Joe Venti and guitarist/vocalist Phil Baker in 2015. For their 2016 United States tour, Laing and Venti were joined by Richie Scarlet, now on lead guitar, and Ken Sidotti on keyboards. They performed Mountain music in addition to songs by West, Bruce and Laing and Cream. And in 2017, Mark Mikel was playing bass with Chris Shutters and Richie Scarlet on guitar in the lineup. Mikel continued until touring was ceased in 2020 due to COVID-19.

Leslie West died on December 22, 2020, after suffering a heart attack. He was 75.

In 2021, Corky Laing's Mountain resumed touring with a lineup of Laing (drums, vocals), Joe Venti (bass, vocals) and Richie Scarlet (guitar, keyboards).

== Band members ==
Classic line-up

- Leslie West – guitar, vocals (1969–1972, 1973–1974, 1981–1985, 1992–1998, 2001–2010; died 2020)
- Felix Pappalardi – bass, vocals, keyboards (1969–1972, 1973–1974; died 1983)
- Steve Knight – keyboards (1969–1972; died 2013)
- Corky Laing – drums, percussion (1969–1972, 1973–1974, 1981–1985, 1992–1998, 2001–2010)

== Discography ==
=== Studio albums ===
Year	Title	Peak chart positions						Certifications
Year	Title	US	CA	AUS	GE	NO	UK	Certifications
1970	Climbing!	17	19	—	—	—	—	US: Gold
1971	Nantucket Sleighride	16	14	38	—	—	43	US: Gold
1971	Flowers of Evil	35	23	39	39	17	—	
1974	Avalanche	102	91	—	—	—	—	
1985	Go for Your Life	166	—	—	—	—	—	
1996	Man's World	—	—	—	—	—	—	
2002	Mystic Fire	—	—	—	—	—	—	
2007	Masters of War	—	—	—	—	—	—	
"—" denotes releases that did not chart.

=== Live albums ===
Year	Title	Peak chart positions		Certifications
Year	Title	US	UK	Certifications
1972	Mountain Live: The Road Goes Ever On	63	21	
1974	Twin Peaks	142	—	
2004	Eruption	—	—	
2013	The Man and the Mountain (Leslie West & Mountain) [2CD]	—	—	
2019	Live at Woodstock (originally issued as Disc 17 of the 38-CD set: Woodstock — Back To The Garden: The Definitive 50th Anniversary Archive)	—	—	
"—" denotes releases that did not chart.

=== Compilation albums ===
Year	Title	Peak chart positions		Certifications
Year	Title	US	AUS	Certifications
1973	The Best of Mountain	72	62	US: Gold
1995	Over the Top [2CD]	142	—	
1998	Super Hits	—	—	
2004	The Very Best of Mountain	—	—	
2010	Crossroader: An Anthology 1970–1974 [2CD]	—	—	
2011	Setlist: The Very Best of Mountain Live (includes 6 previously unreleased tracks)	—	—	
2013	Playlist: The Very Best of Mountain	—	—	
"—" denotes releases that did not chart.

=== Singles ===
Year	Title	US
1969	"Dreams of Milk and Honey"	―
1969	"Long Red"	―
1970	"Mississippi Queen"	21
1970	"For Yasgur's Farm"	107
1971	"The Animal Trainer and the Toad"	76
1971	"Silver Paper" / "Travelin' In The Dark (To E.M.P.)"	―
1972	"Roll Over Beethoven" / "Crossroader"	―
1972	"Waiting to Take You Away"	―
1974	"Whole Lotta Shakin' Goin' On"	―
1985	"Hard Times"	―
1985	"Spark"	―
1996	"In Your Face"	―
