= David Rea (musician) =

American musician (1946–2011)

David Rea (pronounced "ray") (October 26, 1946 in Akron, Ohio – October 27, 2011 in Portland, Oregon, United States) was an American folk guitarist, singer, composer and songwriter. He played with many of the famous names of modern folk music and folk rock, such as Gordon Lightfoot, Joni Mitchell, Richie Havens, Judy Collins, Ian and Sylvia, Fairport Convention, The New Riders of the Purple Sage and Michal Hasek. He said he learned his finger picking style (known as the Travis pick or alternate bass independent thumb picking) from Reverend Gary Davis who spent the last years of his life in Montreal. He was friends with Felix Pappalardi who produced Rea's best known album, Maverick Child. His song writing includes co-writing the hit song "Mississippi Queen". He wrote a radio opera Emperor for the Canadian Broadcasting Corporation. He won the Gabriel Award for Excellence in Broadcasting for a three-part series David Rea's Robert Johnson, about the blues singer Robert Johnson.

Rea’s parents owned a cottage on the Upper French River, where David would enjoy summers along with his brother Jim and sister Betsy, and their two Dalmatian dogs. David played banjo and guitar. occasionally entertaining other cottagers. David made a connection in Toronto and often played at the Riverboat nightclub where he met Ian and Sylvia and Gordon Lightfoot - both of whom he would record with.
