= Windfall Records =

Record label

- Founded: 1969
- Founder: Bud Prager and Felix Pappalardi

Windfall Records was a record label founded in 1969 by Bud Prager and Felix Pappalardi to distribute records of acts they managed and/or produced. Singer-guitarist Leslie West recorded for Windfall throughout the label's existence, initially as a solo artist (1969) and subsequently with the bands Mountain (1970–72 and 1973–74) and West, Bruce and Laing (1972–73).

Windfall was first distributed by Bell Records, who handled their releases through mid-1972. The label then transferred distribution to Columbia Records (now a sister label to Bell's successor Arista Records, which was folded into RCA Records in 2011) as part of Columbia's signing of West, Bruce and Laing. When WBL dissolved in 1973, Mountain re-formed and distributed their releases through Windfall/Columbia. Windfall folded in 1974, following Mountain's breakup.

== See also ==
- List of record labels
