= Leslie West =

American musician (1945–2020)

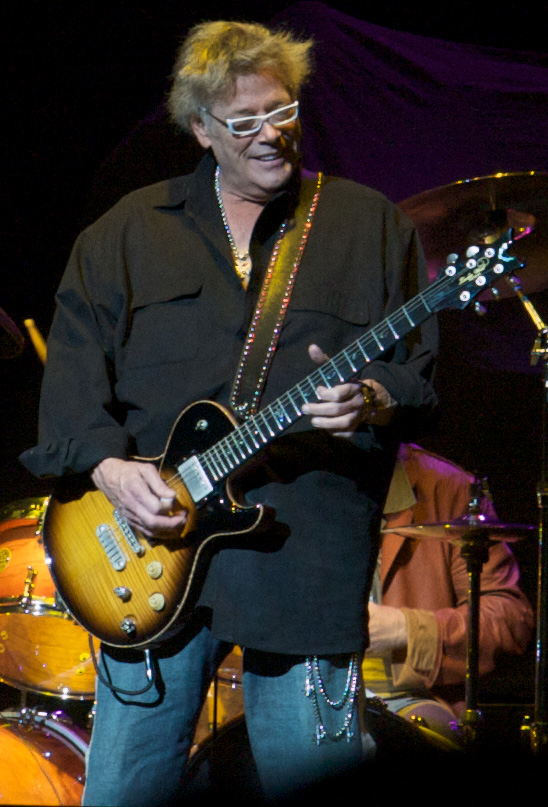
- West live at the Florida Theatre in 2008

Background information
- Born: Leslie Abel Weinstein; October 22, 1945; Queens, New York, U.S.
- Died: December 23, 2020 (aged 75) Palm Coast, Florida, U.S.
- Genres: Rock; hard rock; blues rock; heavy metal
- Occupations: Musician; songwriter
- Instruments: Guitar; vocals
- Years active: 1964–2020
- Labels: Sony; Blues Bureau International; Lightyear
- Formerly of: Mountain; The Vagrants; West, Bruce and Laing

Leslie Abel West (born Weinstein; October 22, 1945 – December 23, 2020) was an American guitarist, singer and songwriter. He was the co-founder, guitarist and co-lead vocalist of the rock band Mountain. West was named the 245th greatest guitarist of all time by Rolling Stone in 2023.

== Life and career ==
=== Early years: 1945–1973 ===
West was born in Forest Hills, Queens, New York City on October 22, 1945 to Jewish parents. He grew up in Hackensack, New Jersey and in East Meadow, Forest Hills, and Lawrence, New York. After his parents divorced, he changed his surname to West. His musical career began with the Vagrants, an R&B/blue-eyed soul-rock band influenced by the likes of the Rascals that was one of the few teenage garage rock acts to come out of the New York metropolitan area (as opposed to the Bohemian Greenwich Village scene of artists, poets, and affiliates of the Beat Generation, which produced bands like the Fugs and the Velvet Underground). The Vagrants had two minor hits in the Eastern United States: 1966's "I Can't Make a Friend" and a cover of Otis Redding's "Respect" the following year.

Some of the Vagrants' recordings were produced by Felix Pappalardi, who was working with Cream on their album Disraeli Gears. In 1969, West and Pappalardi formed the pioneering hard rock act Mountain, which was also the title of West's debut solo album. Rolling Stone identified the band as a "louder version of Cream". With Steve Knight on keyboards and original drummer N. D. Smart, the band appeared on the second day of the Woodstock Festival on Saturday, August 16, 1969, starting an 9-song set at 9 pm.

The band's original incarnation saw West and Pappalardi sharing vocal duties and playing guitar and bass, respectively. New drummer Corky Laing joined the band shortly after Woodstock. They had success with "Mississippi Queen", which reached No. 21 on the Billboard charts and No. 4 in Canada. It was followed by "Theme for an Imaginary Western", written by Cream bassist Jack Bruce. Mountain is one of the bands considered to be forerunners of heavy metal.

After Pappalardi left Mountain to concentrate on production projects, West and Laing produced two studio albums and a live release with Jack Bruce under the name West, Bruce and Laing. West, along with keyboard player Al Kooper of Blood, Sweat & Tears, recorded with the Who during the March 1971 Who's Next sessions. Tracks from the sessions included a cover of Marvin Gaye's "Baby Don't You Do It," and early versions of "Love Ain't For Keepin'" and the Who's signature track "Won't Get Fooled Again". Although the tracks were not included on the album (recording restarted in England a few months later without West or Kooper), they appear as bonus tracks on the 1995 and 2003 reissues of Who's Next and on the 1998 reissue of Odds & Sods.

=== Reforming Mountain and solo career: 1973–2000 ===
Mountain reformed in 1973, only to split again in late 1974. West had acting roles in Family Honor (1973) and The Money Pit (1986).

West also played guitar for the track "Bo Diddley Jam" on Bo Diddley's 1976 20th Anniversary of Rock 'n' Roll all-star album. Also in 1976, West auditioned for Lynyrd Skynyrd after the departure of Ed King, but the vacated slot went to Steve Gaines.

During the mid 1970s, West issued a pair of albums simply credited to himself, 1975's The Great Fatsby (which included a guest appearance by Mick Jagger on guitar) and 1976's The Leslie West Band (which featured Mick Jones on guitar before he formed Foreigner).

Since 1981, Mountain continued to reform, tour, and record on a regular basis. West teamed with Ian Gillan of Deep Purple renown, to co-write and play guitar on the song "Hang Me Out to Dry" from the Gillan album ToolBox, released in Europe in 1991. West and Joe Bonamassa recorded Warren Haynes' "If Heartaches Were Nickels" together. West released it on Guitarded (2005) and Bonamassa on A New Day Yesterday (2000). In May 1987, West played the band leader in a series of late night pilot shows for Howard Stern on the FOX network. He taped a total of five shows with Stern, which never aired. Stern created a new show dubbed the Channel 9 show without West. West continued to make occasional appearances on radio, notably on Stern's radio show.

=== 21st century ===
West contributed the music and co-wrote the lyrics to the song "Immortal" on Clutch's 2001 album Pure Rock Fury, which was a reworked cover of the song "Baby I'm Down" from West's first album. In 2005, he contributed to Ozzy Osbourne's Under Cover album, performing guitar on a remake of "Mississippi Queen". In addition to fronting Mountain, West recorded and performed on his own. His solo album, titled Blue Me, was released in 2006 on the Blues Bureau International label. West was inducted into the Long Island Music Hall of Fame on October 15, 2006. In 2007, Mountain released Masters of War on Big Rack Records, an album featuring 12 Bob Dylan covers that saw Osbourne providing guest vocals on a rendition of the title track.

West married his fiancée Jenni Maurer on stage after Mountain's performance at the Woodstock 40th anniversary concert in Bethel, New York (August 15, 2009). A concert crowd of over 15,000 people was present as West and Maurer were wed under a canopy of upraised electric guitars. On June 20, 2011, West had his right leg amputated as a result of complications from diabetes. West made his first public appearance after his surgery on August 13, 2011. In 2014, West was a guest performer on Eli Cook's album Primitive Son. His 2015 album, Soundcheck, peaked at number 2 on the Billboard Top Blues Albums chart.

Weeks before his death West was scheduled to begin recording a new studio album with a variety of guitarists. That group of musicians, including Slash, Zakk Wylde, Dee Snider, and others, came together to record the album, titled Legacy: A Tribute to Leslie West, which was released on 25 March 2022.

== Health, death, and tributes ==
By the late 1970s, West was recovering from addiction to heroin, morphine, and cocaine. West said in various interviews that his drug problems and similar drug abuse problems of other bandmates, had interfered with the success of both Mountain and West, Bruce and Laing. In the mid-1980s, just as he was overcoming the drug problems, West was diagnosed with diabetes, and his weight fluctuated over the years as he struggled with the disease. In the early 2000s, he survived a short bout with bladder cancer. In 2011, due to complications from his diabetes, West's right leg had to be amputated. West said in a 2014 interview that he believed his past smoking also contributed to the crisis with his leg.

West went into cardiac arrest on December 21, 2020, and was rushed to a hospital in nearby Palm Coast, Florida, where he never regained consciousness. After being contacted by Rolling Stone, his brother Larry confirmed that Leslie had died. A report by Variety, based on social media posts made by Larry, states that Leslie died on December 23, 2020. He was 75.

Many celebrities and rock musicians paid tribute to West on his death, including Howard Stern, Brian May, Geezer Butler, Peter Frampton, Joe Satriani, Neal Schon, David Coverdale, Vernon Reid, Tom Morello, Slash, and Joe Bonamassa and Dee Snider. Foo Fighters also performed "Mississippi Queen" live on The Howard Stern Show in tribute to West shortly after his death.

== Influence on other guitarists ==
A multitude of rock guitarists have credited West as an influence on their playing over the years, including Eddie Van Halen, Randy Rhoads, Michael Schenker, Johnny Ramone, and Tim Sult, among others.

== Equipment ==
West was renowned for helping popularize the Gibson Les Paul Jr. guitar, with a single P-90 pickup, along with the use of Sunn Amplifiers, to create a tone which became his trademark sound. According to former Guitar World editor-in-chief Brad Tolinski, West achieved his trademark early 1970s guitar tone via a Sunn Coliseum PA that ran on 6550 tubes rather than a traditional guitar amplifier.

=== Guitars ===
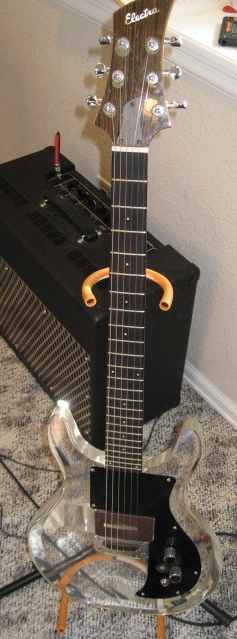
An Electra Plexiglass guitar of the type West used for slide guitar during the 1970s. This guitar was often mistaken for the nearly identical Dan Armstrong from which it was copied

West frequently used two Les Paul Juniors, one TV Yellow and the other a sunburst. West also used a modified Gibson Flying V, with the neck pickup removed (he used the hole for an ash tray) and a P-90 pickup fitted at the bridge position. West also had a two-pickup Flying V (serial number 906965) which he used after the "ash tray" Flying V broke. West also used a plexiglass Electra guitar, which is a Japanese copy of the better-known Ampeg-made Dan Armstrong guitar, for slide.

West also played a Westone Pantera guitar. From 1977 to 1982, he used a signature on-board effects MPC model guitar, created by the Japanese company Electra. He most recently used a signature model from Dean Guitars, the USA Soltero Leslie West Signature model, fitted with a custom-designed Dean pickup called "Mountain of Tone." Based on an endorsing contract in the 1970s, West played British-made Burns guitars. West also long favored "headless" guitars, and can be seen playing them on some of the videos he appeared in. In an interview segment on Night of the Guitars – Live! West stated that he had narrowed his commonly played instruments down to two: an off-the-shelf Steinberger and a Kramer with DiMarzio pickups.

=== Amplifiers ===
In 2005, West received a sponsorship with Carlsbro amplifiers, and could frequently be seen playing through "Carlsbro 50 Top" valve heads. His studio amplifier was a Marshall JMP. Live, he used Marshall JCM 900s. He started endorsing and using Budda Amplification in 2008. He was also associated with Sunn amplifiers, and used a Sunn Coliseum PA head, when it was shipped to him by accident. He claimed that this is the amp that gave him his signature sound in a Gibson interview with West.

The Sunn amplifiers that West used were of the late 1960s era and were not factory stock. The four-channel amplifier heads' preamps were wired as cascading preamps to channel one, out to the amp's power section. This is what produced the long compressed sustain and distorted overdrive of the great Mountain sound that he is well known for.

West used Blackstar amps. West also used Budda amplifiers, with a Budda backline visible on stage footage of West's appearances.

=== Effects ===
West employed octaver, chorus, and delay effects.

== Discography ==
=== Solo ===
Year	Album	Peak chart positions		
Year	Album	US	US Blues	UK
1969	Mountain	72	—	—
1975	The Great Fatsby	168	—	—
1976	The Leslie West Band	—	—	—
1988	Theme	—	—	—
1989	Alligator	—	—	—
1989	Night of the Guitar- Live!	—	—	—
1993	Leslie West Live!	—	—	—
1994	Dodgin' the Dirt	—	—	—
1999	As Phat as it Gets	—	—	—
2003	Blues to Die for	—	—	—
2005	Guitarded	—	—	—
2005	Got Blooze	—	—	—
2006	Blue Me	—	—	—
2011	Unusual Suspects	—	4	153
2013	Still Climbing	198	1	—
2015	Soundcheck	—	2	—

=== With West, Bruce and Laing ===
Year	Album
1972	Why Dontcha
1973	Whatever Turns You On
1974	Live 'n' Kickin'
