= Felix Pappalardi =

American music producer and musician (1939–1983)

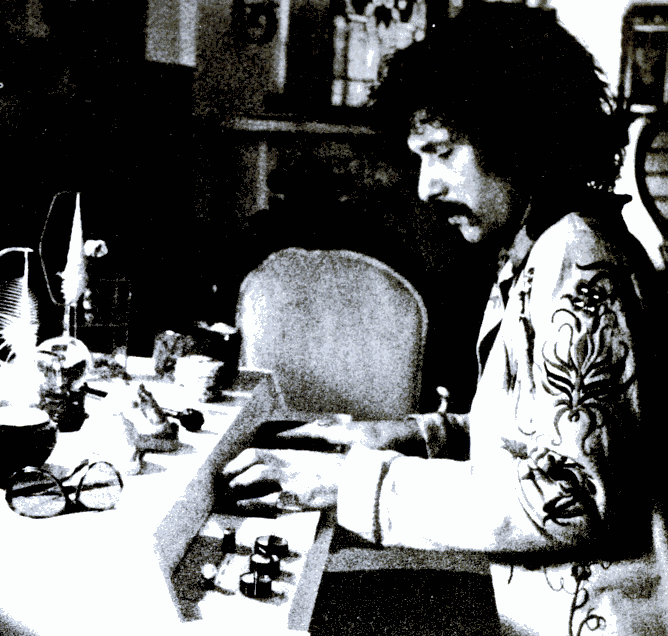
- Pappalardi playing a Mellotron in 1974

Background information
- Born: Felix Albert Pappalardi Jr. December 30, 1939; New York City, U.S.
- Died: April 17, 1983 (aged 43) New York City, U.S.
- Genres: Rock, blues rock, hard rock
- Occupations: Music producer, songwriter, musician
- Instruments: Bass; vocals; keyboards; guitar
- Years active: 1963–1983
- Formerly of: Mountain, Creation
- Spouse: Gail Collins

Felix Albert Pappalardi Jr. (December 30, 1939 – April 17, 1983) was an American music producer, songwriter, vocalist, and bassist. He is best known as the bassist and co-lead vocalist of the band Mountain, whose song "Mississippi Queen" peaked at number 21 on the Billboard Hot 100 and became a classic rock radio staple.

Originating in the eclectic music scene in New York's Greenwich Village, he became closely attached to the British power trio Cream, writing, arranging, and producing for their second album Disraeli Gears. As a producer for Atlantic Records, he worked on several projects with guitarist Leslie West; in 1969 their partnership evolved into the band Mountain. The band's original run lasted less than five years, but their work influenced the first generation of heavy metal and hard rock music. Pappalardi continued to work as a producer, session musician, and songwriter until he was shot and killed by his wife Gail Collins in 1983.

== Early life ==
Pappalardi was born in the Bronx, New York City, to an Italian family who immigrated from Gravina in Puglia. A classically trained musician, he graduated from New York City's High School of Music & Art and attended the University of Michigan.

== Career ==
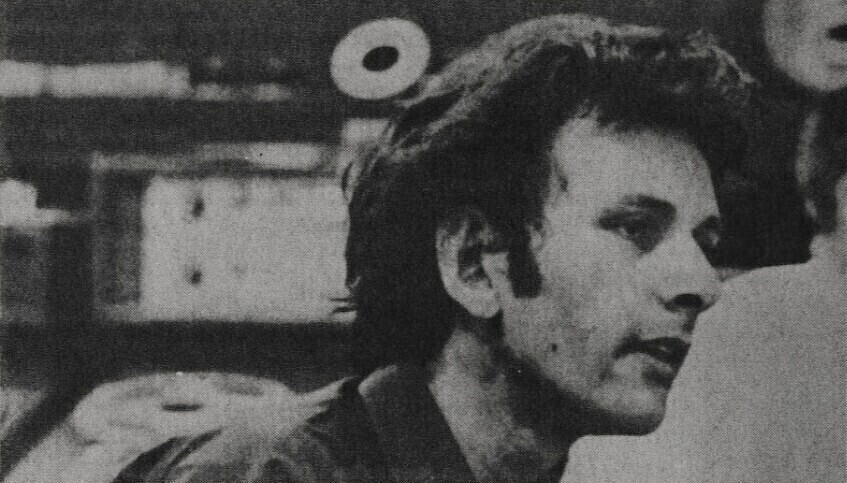
Pappalardi in 1968

In 1964, Pappalardi was a member of Max Morath's Original Rag Quartet (ORQ) in their premier engagement at New York City's Village Vanguard. Along with Pappalardi on guitarrón (Mexican acoustic bass) were pianist-singer Morath, who revived classic ragtime played in the Scott Joplin manner, Barry Kornfeld, a New York studio folk and jazz guitarist, and Jim Tyler, a Baroque and Renaissance lutenist, playing four-string banjo and mandolin. The ORQ toured the college and concert circuit, opening four engagements with the Dinah Shore show in Las Vegas and elsewhere. Pappalardi studied classical music at the University of Michigan. Upon completing his studies and returning to New York, he was unable to find work and so became part of the Greenwich Village folk-music scene, where he made a name for himself as an arranger; he appeared on albums by Tom Paxton, Vince Martin and Fred Neil for Elektra Records. Thereafter he moved into record production, initially concentrating on folk and folk-rock acts for artists such as The Youngbloods and Joan Baez.

As a producer, Pappalardi is perhaps best known for his work with Cream, beginning with their second album, Disraeli Gears. He contributed instrumentation for his studio arrangements and he and his wife, Gail Collins, wrote the Cream hit "Strange Brew" with Eric Clapton. He also produced The Youngbloods' first album

As a musician, Pappalardi is widely recognized as a bassist, vocalist, and founding member of the American hard rock band (and heavy metal forerunner) Mountain, a band born out of his working with future bandmate Leslie West's soul-inspired rock and roll band The Vagrants, and producing West's 1969 Mountain solo album. The band's original incarnation actively recorded and toured between 1969 and 1971. Pappalardi produced the band's albums, and co-wrote and arranged a number of the band's songs with Collins and West.

== Later life and death ==
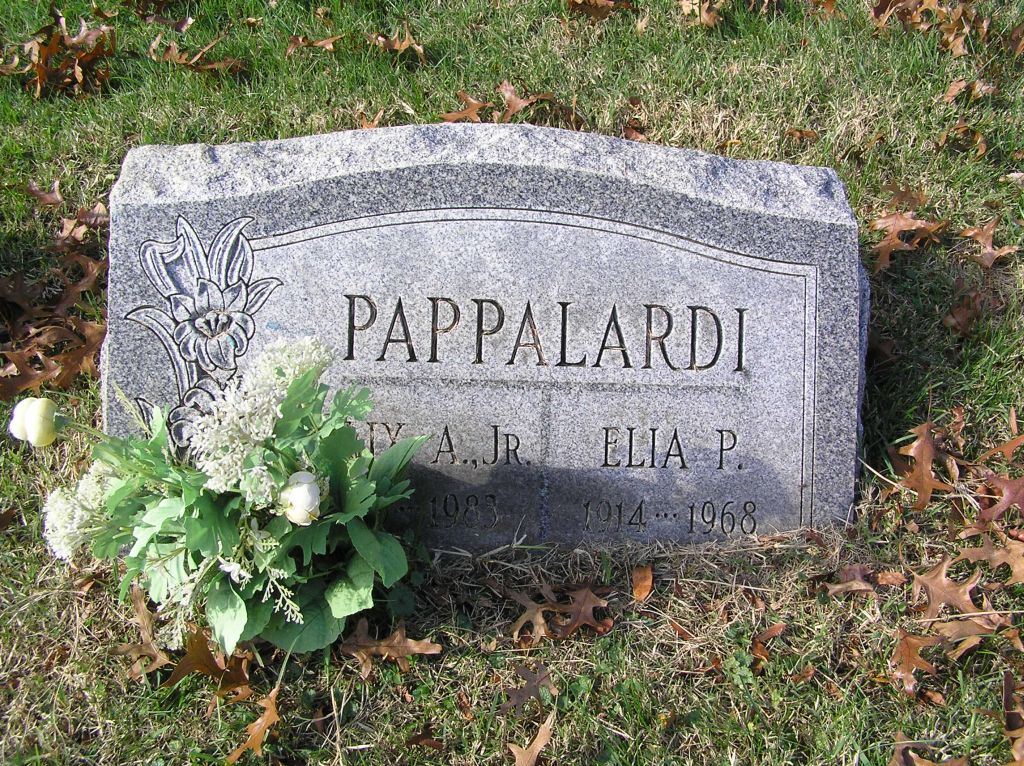
The grave of Felix Pappalardi in Woodlawn Cemetery

Pappalardi was forced to retire because of partial deafness, ostensibly from his high-volume shows with Mountain. He continued producing throughout the 1970s, released a solo album (Don't Worry, Ma) and recorded with Kazuo Takeda's band Creation (who had opened for a reunited Mountain during their 1973 tour of Japan).

In May 1973, the British music magazine NME reported that Pappalardi would be producing and playing bass on Queen of the Night, the debut album for Maggie Bell, former singer of Stone the Crows, but this proved to be false.

He produced The Dead Boys album We Have Come for Your Children in 1978.

He also worked on the NBC show Hot Hero Sandwich in 1979.

Pappalardi was shot and killed by his wife, Gail Collins Pappalardi, on April 17, 1983, in their apartment on the East Side of Manhattan, with a derringer he had given her as a gift a few months previously. She was subsequently charged with second-degree murder and was found guilty of the lesser criminally negligent homicide.

He is interred next to his mother at Woodlawn Cemetery in the Bronx, New York City.

== Selected discography ==
For his work with Mountain, see their page.

- 1976: Creation/Felix Pappalardi – collaboration with Creation
- 1979: Don't Worry, Ma

=== As producer ===
- 1967: Bartholomew Plus Three – "When I Fall In Love" // "I Can't Go Back"
- 1967: The Vagrants – "A Sunny Summer Rain" // "Beside The Sea"
- 1967: The Youngbloods – The Youngbloods
- 1967: Cream – Disraeli Gears
- 1967: Hamilton Camp – Here's to You
- 1968: Bo Grumpus – Before the War
- 1968: Kensington Market – Avenue Road
- 1968: Cream – Wheels of Fire
- 1969: Cream – Goodbye
- 1969: Kensington Market – Aardvark
- 1969: Leslie West – Mountain
- 1969: Jack Bruce – Songs for a Tailor
- 1969: Jolliver Arkansaw – Home
- 1969: David Rea – Maverick Child
- 1970: Mountain – Climbing!
- 1971: Mylon LeFevre – Mylon: Holy Smoke with The Family Holy Smoke (Columbia 31085)
- 1971: Mountain – Nantucket Sleighride
- 1971: Mountain – Flowers of Evil
- 1972: Mountain – Mountain Live: The Road Goes Ever On
- 1973: Bedlam – Bedlam (Francesco Aiello/Dave Ball/Denny Ball/Cozy Powell)
- 1974: Mountain – Twin Peaks
- 1974: Mountain – Avalanche
- 1974: Back Door – 8th St. Nites
- 1975: White Lightnin' – White Lightnin' (Donald Kinsey/Busta Cherry Jones/Woody Kinsey)
- 1975: The Flock – Inside Out
- 1976: Natural Gas – Natural Gas
- 1977: Gasolin' – Killin' Time
- 1977: Jesse Colin Young – Love on the Wing
- 1977: Corky Laing – The Secret Sessions with Ian Hunter, Mick Ronson (finally released in 1999)
- 1978: The Dead Boys – We Have Come for Your Children
- 1978: Hot Tuna – Double Dose
- 1981: Kicks – Kicks featuring Marge Raymond (Recorded at RPM Studios, New York)
- 1982: George Flowers and Gary Byrd – The Day That Football Died

=== Other appearances and contributions ===
- 1963: Vince Martin and Fred Neil – Tear Down the Walls – guitarrón and backing vocals
- 1964: Tom Paxton – Ramblin' Boy – guitarrón
- 1965: Tom Paxton – Ain't That News! – guitarrón
- 1966: Buffy Sainte-Marie – Little Wheel Spin and Spin – credited as "instrumental ensemble arranger and conductor" on "Timeless Love"
- 1966: Ian and Sylvia – Play One More – bass
- 1966: Ian and Sylvia – The French Girl – credited as "arr. and conducted"
- 1966: Ian and Sylvia – When I Was A Cowboy – bass
- 1966: Ian and Sylvia – Short Grass – bass
- 1966: Ian and Sylvia – Lonely Girls – bass
- 1967: Devil's Anvil – Hard Rock From the Middle East – bass, guitar, tambura, percussion and vocals, credited as "arranger and musical director"
- 1967: Richie Havens – Morning, Morning – credited as "arranger'
- 1967: Jackie Washington [Landrón] – Morning Song – credited as "backup ensemble conductor'
- 1968: Bo Grumpus – Before the War – keyboards, trumpet, bass, guitar, percussion, ocarina
- 1968: Kensington Market – Avenue Road – vocals on "Aunt Violet's Knee"
- 1969: Kensington Market – Aardvark – bass, piano, trumpet, organ
- 1969: Jolliver Arkansaw – Home – keyboards, guitar, ocarina and bass on "Hatred Sun"
- 1970: Ian and Sylvia – Greatest Hits – bass
- 1970: Fred Neil – Little Bit of Rain – bass
- 1971: John Sebastian – The Four of Us – bass on "Apple Hill"
- 1971: Richard & Mimi Fariña – The Best of Richard & Mimi Fariña – bass
- 1973: Bedlam – Bedlam – keyboards, credited as songwriter on "Looking Through Love's Eyes (Busy Dreamin')"
- 1973: Eddie Mottau – No Turning Around – Mellotron, organ, ocarina and trumpet on "Circus Tent" and "Waitin' Out The Winter"
- 1975: The Flock – Inside Out – backing vocals on "Straight Home"
- 1977: Jesse Colin Young – Love on the Wing – backing vocals and string arrangements on "Drift Away" and "Fool", horn arrangements on "Louisiana Highway"
- 1981: Kicks – Kicks featuring Marge Raymond – backing vocals on "Raceway" and "All Over Again" along with Steven Tyler
