= His Best (Howlin' Wolf album) =

Greatest hits album by Howlin' Wolf
- Released: April 8, 1997
- Recorded: May 14 or August 1951; May 25, 1954 – August 1964
- Genre: Chicago blues
- Length: 55:41
- Label: MCA/Chess
- Producers: Sam Phillips, Leonard Chess, Phil Chess, Willie Dixon, Andy McKaie
- Compiler: Andy McKaie

Howlin' Wolf chronology
Bluesmaster (1996)	His Best (1997)	His Best, Vol. 2 (1999)

His Best is a greatest hits album by American blues musician Howlin' Wolf. The album was originally released on April 8, 1997, by MCA/Chess Records, and was one of a series of releases by MCA for the 50th anniversary of Chess Records that year (see 1997 in music). Ten years later – on April 17, 2007 – the album was reissued by Geffen Records as The Definitive Collection.

The album features several of his most well-known recording including "Smokestack Lightnin'", "Spoonful", and "Killing Floor".

== Recording and production ==
The first two songs on the collection – "Moanin' at Midnight" and "How Many More Years" – were recorded at Memphis Recording Service on either May 14, or August 1951 and were produced by Sam Phillips, who would later produce Elvis Presley and Johnny Cash. The rest of the songs on the album were recorded in Chicago from May 1954 to August 1964. The original recordings were produced by either the Chess brothers (Leonard and Phil) and/or Willie Dixon, who recorded numerous artists for Chess Records. The reissue production was handled by Andy McKaie with digital remastering by Erick Labson.

== Artwork, packaging ==
The album's art director was Vartan, the album was designed by Mike Fink. The photographs for the album were credited to Brian Smith, Joseph Sia, Frank Driggs, Ray Flerlage, Peter Amft, John Gibbs Rockwood, and the Universal Music Archives. The liner notes for the album were written by Mark Humphrey.

== Track listing ==
No.	Title	Writer(s)	Recording date	Length
1.	"Moanin' at Midnight"	Chester Burnett	May 14, or August 1951	2:56
2.	"How Many More Years"	Burnett	May 14, or August 1951	2:43
3.	"Evil (Is Going On)"	Willie Dixon	May 25, 1954	2:55
4.	"Forty-Four"	Burnett	October 1954	2:49
5.	"Smokestack Lightnin'"	Burnett	January 1956	3:09
6.	"I Asked for Water (She Gave Me Gasoline)"	Burnett	July 19, 1956	2:52
7.	"Who's Been Talkin'"	Burnett	June 24, 1957	2:24
8.	"Sitting on Top of the World"	Walter Vinson, Lonnie Chatmon; arr. Burnett	December 1957	2:34
9.	"Howlin' for My Darlin'"	Burnett, Dixon	July 1959	2:33
10.	"Wang Dang Doodle"	Dixon	June 1960	2:25
11.	"Back Door Man"	Dixon	June 1960	2:51
12.	"Spoonful"	Dixon	June 1960	2:45
13.	"Shake for Me"	Dixon	June 1961	2:18
14.	"The Red Rooster"	Dixon	June 1961	2:29
15.	"I Ain't Superstitious"	Dixon	December 1961	2:56
16.	"Goin' Down Slow"	James B. Oden	December 1961	4:04
17.	"Three Hundred Pounds of Joy"	Dixon	August 14, 1963	3:07
18.	"Hidden Charms"	Dixon	August 14, 1963	2:23
19.	"Built for Comfort"	Dixon	August 14, 1963	2:39
20.	"Killing Floor"	Burnett	August 1964	2:49

== Personnel ==
- Howlin' Wolf – vocals, harmonica, guitar
- Willie Johnson – guitar
- Willie Steele – drums on "Moanin' at Midnight" and "How Many More Years"
- Ike Turner – piano on "How Many More Years"
- Albert Williams – piano on "How Many More Years"
- Sam Phillips – production on "Moanin' at Midnight" and "How Many More Years"
- Otis Spann – piano
- Jody Williams – guitar on "Evil (Is Going On)" and "Forty-Four"
- Hubert Sumlin – guitar
- Willie Dixon – vocals on "Goin' Down Slow", bass, production
- Earl Phillips – drums
- Hosea Lee Kennard – piano
- Otis "Smokey" Smothers – guitar on "I Asked for Water" and "Who's Been Talkin'"
- Adolph "Billy" Duncan – tenor saxophone on "Who's Been Talkin'"
- Alfred Elkins – bass on "Who's Been Talkin'" and "Sitting on Top of the World"
- Andrew "Blueblood" McMahon – bass on "Killing Floor"
- Abb Locke – tenor saxophone on "Howlin' for My Darlin'"
- S. P. Leary – drums on "Howlin' for My Darlin'"
- Abe Smothers – guitar on "Howlin' for My Darlin'"
- Freddy King – guitar
- Freddie Robinson – guitar
- Fred Below – drums
- Johnny Jones – piano on "Shake for Me" and "The Red Rooster"
- Jimmy Rogers – guitar
- Henry Gray – piano on "I Ain't Superstitious" and "Goin' Down Slow"
- Sam Lay – drums
- J. T. Brown – tenor saxophone
- Donald Hankins – baritone saxophone
- Lafayette Leake – piano
- Buddy Guy – bass guitar, guitar on "Killing Floor"
- Leonard Chess – production
- Phil Chess – production
- Andy McKaie – reissue production, compilation
- Erick Labson – digital remastering
