= White Station =

White Station may refer to:

- White Station, Mississippi, an unincorporated community located in Clay County
- White Station, Memphis, Tennessee, an unincorporated area in Shelby County
  - White Station High School, in Memphis, Tennessee
  - White Station Middle School, in Memphis, Tennessee
  - White Station Tower, a high-rise office building in Memphis, Tennessee
