= Led Zeppelin North American Tour Spring 1969 =

1969 concert tour by Led Zeppelin

North America Spring 1969
- Tour by Led Zeppelin
- Poster for Led Zeppelin's concert at the Fillmore West, used to help promote its Spring 1969 North American tour
- Location: United States; Canada
- Associated album: Led Zeppelin
- Start date: 24 April 1969
- End date: 31 May 1969 (scheduled to end on 1 June 1969)
- No. of shows: 28 (30 scheduled)

Led Zeppelin concert chronology
- United Kingdom & Scandinavia 1969; North America Spring 1969; United Kingdom Summer 1969

Led Zeppelin's Spring 1969 North American Tour was the second concert tour of North America by the English rock band. The tour commenced on 18 April and concluded on 31 May 1969.

By this point in time, Led Zeppelin's popularity was such that the group had reached top billing, sharing that honour for some of their gigs with established acts such as Julie Driscoll, Delaney & Bonnie and Three Dog Night. They were now receiving four times the money that they had previously commanded on their first tour of America just a few months earlier. Also, the band for some of its performances was one of the first groups to give single bill concerts without an opening act. However, for the band's concert at Columbia, Maryland, on 25 May, manager Peter Grant agreed for Led Zeppelin to receive second billing in support of The Who. This was the only time that these two English bands ever performed on the same bill.

During this tour the band took time out to record tracks at various recording studios for their forthcoming album, Led Zeppelin II. Many of the tracks were later mixed down by Eddie Kramer at A&R Studios, New York City.

It was during this period that Led Zeppelin guitarist Jimmy Page switched from using his Telecaster to his signature Gibson Les Paul, whilst also incorporating the use of Marshall amplifiers.

== Tour set list ==
The fairly typical set list for the tour was:

1. "Train Kept A-Rollin' " (Bradshaw, Kay, Mann)
2. "I Can't Quit You Baby" (Dixon)
3. "Dazed and Confused" (Page)
4. "As Long As I Have You" (Mimms) (dropped after 24 May)
5. "Killing Floor" (Wolf)
6. "White Summer"/"Black Mountain Side" (Page)
7. "Sitting And Thinking" (Guy) (on 27 April only)
8. "Babe I'm Gonna Leave You" (Bredon, Page, Plant)
9. "You Shook Me" (Dixon, Lenoir)
10. "How Many More Times" (Bonham, Jones, Page)
11. "Communication Breakdown" (Bonham, Jones, Page)
12. "Pat's Delight" (Bonham)
13. "Whole Lotta Love" (Bonham, Dixon, Jones, Page, Plant) (on 26 April, 11 May, and 25 May only)

There were some set list substitutions, variations, and order switches during the tour.

== Tour dates ==
Date	City	Country	Venue
24 April 1969	San Francisco	United States	Fillmore West
25 April 1969	San Francisco	United States	Winterland Ballroom
26 April 1969	San Francisco	United States	Winterland Ballroom
27 April 1969	San Francisco	United States	Fillmore West
1 May 1969	Irvine	United States	Crawford Hall - UC Irvine
2 May 1969	Pasadena	United States	Rose Palace
3 May 1969	Pasadena	United States	Rose Palace
9 May 1969	Edmonton	Canada	Edmonton Gardens
10 May 1969	Vancouver	Canada	PNE Agrodome
11 May 1969	Seattle	United States	Green Lake Aqua Theater
13 May 1969	Honolulu	United States	Civic Auditorium
16 May 1969	Detroit	United States	Grande Ballroom two shows
17 May 1969	Athens, OH	United States	Convocation Center
18 May 1969	Minneapolis	United States	Guthrie Theater
23 May 1969	Chicago	United States	Kinetic Playground
24 May 1969	Chicago	United States	Kinetic Playground
25 May 1969	Columbia, MD	United States	Merriweather Post Pavilion
~~26 May 1969~~	Boston	United States	Boston Tea Party
27 May 1969	Boston	United States	Boston Tea Party
28 May 1969	Boston	United States	Boston Tea Party
29 May 1969	Boston	United States	Boston Tea Party
30 May 1969	New York City	United States	Fillmore East
31 May 1969	New York City	United States	Fillmore East
~~1 June 1969~~	~~St. Louis~~	United States	~~Kiel Auditorium~~

== Sources ==
- Lewis, Dave and Pallett, Simon (1997) Led Zeppelin: The Concert File, London: Omnibus Press. ISBN 0-7119-5307-4.
