= The London Howlin' Wolf Sessions =

Studio album by Howlin' Wolf
- Released: August 1971
- Recorded: May 2–7, 1970
- Studios: Olympic, London, England
- Genre: Chicago blues
- Length: 39:43
- Label: Chess/Rolling Stones
- Producer: Norman Dayron

Howlin' Wolf chronology
Message to the Young (1971)	The London Howlin' Wolf Sessions (1971)	Live and Cookin' (1972)

London Sessions chronology
The London Howlin' Wolf Sessions (1971)	The London Muddy Waters Sessions (1972)

Professional ratings
Review scores
Source	Rating
The Penguin Guide to Blues Recordings	3/4 stars
Christgau's Record Guide	A−
Select	4/5 medals

The London Howlin' Wolf Sessions is an album by blues musician Howlin' Wolf released in 1971 on Chess Records, and on Rolling Stones Records in Britain. It was one of the first super session blues albums, setting a blues master among famous musicians from the second generation of rock and roll, in this case Eric Clapton, Steve Winwood, Charlie Watts, and Bill Wyman. It peaked at #79 on the Billboard 200.

== History ==
Backstage at the Fillmore Auditorium, after a concert by the Paul Butterfield Blues Band, Electric Flag, and Cream, Chess Records staff producer Norman Dayron spotted the guitar players of the latter two bands, Mike Bloomfield and Eric Clapton, talking and joking around. Dayron approached Clapton and, on impulse, asked "how would you like to do an album with Howlin' Wolf?" After confirming that the offer was legitimate, Clapton agreed, and Dayron set up sessions in London through the Chess organization to coordinate with Clapton's schedule.

Clapton secured the participation of the Rolling Stones rhythm section (pianist Ian Stewart, bassist Bill Wyman and drummer Charlie Watts), while Dayron assembled further musicians, including 19-year-old harmonica prodigy Jeffrey Carp, who died in 1973 at age 24. Initially, Marshall Chess did not want to pay the expense for flights and accommodations to send Wolf's long-serving guitarist Hubert Sumlin to England, but an ultimatum by Clapton mandated his presence. Sessions took place between May 2 and May 7, 1970, at Olympic Studios.

On the first day, May 2, Watts and Wyman were unavailable, and a call went out for immediate replacements. Many showed up, but only recordings featuring Klaus Voormann and Ringo Starr were released from that day. In the initial album credits, Starr is listed as "Richie," as Dayron was under the impression that, being a Beatle, his name could not be used directly.

Further overdubbing took place at the Chess studios in Chicago with Chess regulars Lafayette Leake on piano and Phil Upchurch on bass, and horn players Jordan Sandke, Dennis Lansing, and Joe Miller of the 43rd Street Snipers, Carp's band. Ex-Blind Faith keyboardist Steve Winwood, on tour in the United States, contributed to the overdubbing sessions as well. Although he actually plays on only five tracks for the original album, his name is featured on the cover below the Wolf's, along with Clapton, Wyman, and Watts. Conversely, guitarist Paul Asbell was asked to "fill in the spaces" in "I Ain't Superstitious" due to Clapton's original parts overshadowed by the overdubbed horns, but only got credited in the special thanks section. Similarly, Mick Jagger played uncredited percussion at the London sessions, joining his Rolling Stones band mates.

On March 4, 2003, the current owner of the Chess catalogue Universal Music Group released a two-disc Deluxe Edition of the London Sessions. Included as bonus tracks on the first disc were three performances initially released on Chess CH 60026 in February 1974, London Revisited. The second disc featured outtakes and different mixes.

== Track and personnel listing ==
All songs written by Howlin' Wolf (listed under his real name of Chester Burnett), except as indicated.

=== Side one ===
1. "Rockin' Daddy" – 3:43 (recorded May 4, 1970)
  - Howlin' Wolf – vocal; Hubert Sumlin – rhythm guitar; Eric Clapton – lead guitar; Ian Stewart – piano; Phil Upchurch – bass; Charlie Watts – drums.
2. "I Ain't Superstitious" (Willie Dixon) – 3:34 (recorded May 2, 1970)
  - Wolf – vocal; Sumlin – rhythm guitar; Clapton – lead guitar; Steve Winwood – piano; Klaus Voormann – bass; Ringo Starr – drums; Jordan Sandke – trumpet; Dennis Lansing – tenor saxophone; Joe Miller – baritone saxophone; Paul Asbell – additional lead guitar; Bill Wyman – cowbell.
3. "Sittin' On Top Of The World" – 3:51 (recorded May 6, 1970)
  - Wolf – vocal; Jeffrey Carp – harmonica; Sumlin – rhythm guitar; Clapton – lead guitar; Lafayette Leake – piano; Wyman – bass; Watts – drums.
4. "Worried About My Baby" – 2:55 (recorded May 7, 1970)
  - Wolf – vocal, harmonica; Sumlin – rhythm guitar; Clapton – lead guitar; Leake – piano; Wyman – bass; Watts – drums.
5. "What A Woman!" (James Oden) – 3:02 (recorded May 7, 1970)
  - Wolf – vocal; Carp – harmonica; Sumlin – rhythm guitar; Clapton – lead guitar; Winwood – organ; Wyman – bass; Watts – drums.
6. "Poor Boy" – 3:04 (recorded May 4, 1970)
  - Wolf – vocal; Carp – harmonica; Sumlin – rhythm guitar; Clapton – lead guitar; Winwood – piano; Wyman – bass; Watts – drums.

=== Side two ===
1. "Built For Comfort" (Dixon) – 2:08 (recorded May 7, 1970)
  - Wolf – vocal; Sumlin – rhythm guitar; Clapton – lead guitar; Stewart – piano; Wyman – bass; Watts – drums; Sandke – trumpet; Lansing, Miller – saxophones
2. "Who's Been Talking?" – 3:02 (recorded May 7, 1970)
  - Wolf – vocal, harmonica; Sumlin – rhythm guitar; Clapton – lead guitar; John Simon – piano; Winwood – organ; Wyman – bass, shaker; Watts – drums, conga, percussion.
3. "The Red Rooster (Rehearsal)" – 1:58 (recorded May 7, 1970)
  - Wolf – vocal; guitar; other personnel as below
4. "The Red Rooster" (Willie Dixon) – 3:47 (recorded May 7, 1970)
  - Wolf – vocal; Sumlin – rhythm guitar; Clapton – lead guitar; Leake – piano; Wyman – bass; Watts – drums.
5. "Do The Do" (Willie Dixon) – 2:18 (recorded May 6, 1970)
  - Wolf – vocal; Sumlin – rhythm guitar; Clapton – lead guitar; Stewart – piano; Wyman – bass, cowbell; Watts – drums.
6. "Highway 49" (Joe Lee Williams) – 2:45 (recorded May 6, 1970)
  - Wolf – vocal; Carp – harmonica; Sumlin – rhythm guitar; Clapton – lead guitar; Winwood – piano; Wyman – bass; Watts – drums.
7. "Wang-Dang-Doodle" (Willie Dixon) – 3:27 (recorded May 4, 1970)
  - Wolf – vocal; Carp – harmonica; Sumlin – rhythm guitar; Clapton – lead guitar; Stewart – piano; Wyman – bass; Watts – drums.

=== 2003 Deluxe Edition bonus tracks ===
1. "Goin' Down Slow" (James Oden) – 5:52 (recorded May 2, 1970)
  - Wolf – vocal; Carp – harmonica; Clapton – lead guitar; Voormann – bass; Starr – drums.
2. "Killing Floor" – 5:18 (recorded May 7, 1970)
  - Wolf – vocal, electric guitar; Clapton – electric guitar; Wyman – bass; Watts – drums.
3. "I Want To Have A Word With You" - 4:07 (recorded May 2, 1970)
  - Wolf – vocal; Sumlin – rhythm guitar; Clapton – lead guitar; Voormann – bass; Starr – drums.

=== 2003 Deluxe Edition disc two ===
1. "Worried About My Baby" (rehearsal take) – 4:31 (recorded May 7, 1970)
  - Wolf – vocal, harmonica; Clapton – lead guitar; Wyman – bass.
2. "The Red Rooster" (alternate mix) – 4:02 (recorded May 7, 1970)
  - Wolf – vocal; Sumlin – rhythm guitar; Clapton – lead guitar; Leake – piano; Wyman – bass; Watts – drums.
3. "What A Woman" (alternate take) – 5:10 (recorded May 7, 1970)
  - Wolf – vocal; Carp – harmonica; Sumlin – rhythm guitar; Clapton – lead guitar; Stewart – piano; Wyman – bass; Watts – drums.
4. "Who's Been Talking" (alternate take with false start and dialogue) – 5:51 (recorded May 7, 1970)
  - Wolf – vocal, harmonica; Sumlin – rhythm guitar; Clapton – lead guitar; Stewart – piano; Wyman – bass; Watts – drums.
5. "Worried About My Baby" (alternate take) – 3:43 (recorded May 7, 1970)
  - Wolf – vocal, harmonica; Sumlin – rhythm guitar; Clapton – lead guitar; Stewart – piano; Wyman – bass; Watts – drums.
6. "I Ain't Superstitious" (alternate take) – 4:10 (recorded May 2, 1970)
  - Wolf – vocal; Carp – harmonica; Sumlin – rhythm guitar; Clapton – lead guitar; Stewart – piano; Voormann – bass; Starr – drums.
7. "Highway 49" (alternate take) – 3:39 (recorded May 6, 1970)
  - Wolf – vocal; Sumlin – rhythm guitar; Clapton – lead guitar; Stewart – piano; Wyman – bass; Watts – drums.
8. "Do The Do" (extended alternate take) – 5:44 (recorded May 6, 1970)
  - Wolf – vocal; Sumlin – rhythm guitar; Clapton – lead guitar; Stewart – piano; Wyman – bass, cowbell; Watts – drums.
9. "Poor Boy" (alternate lyrics mix) – 4:27 (recorded May 4, 1970)
  - Wolf – vocal; Carp – harmonica; Sumlin – rhythm guitar; Clapton – lead guitar; Winwood – piano; Wyman – bass; Watts – drums.
10. "I Ain't Superstitious" (alternate mix) – 3:53 (recorded May 2, 1970)
  - Wolf – vocal; Sumlin – rhythm guitar; Clapton – lead guitar; Winwood – piano; Voormann – bass; Starr – drums; Sandke – trumpet; Lansing, Miller – saxophones; Wyman – cowbell.
11. "What A Woman" (alternate mix with organ overdub) – 3:10 (recorded May 7, 1970)
  - Wolf – vocal; Carp – harmonica; Sumlin – rhythm guitar; Clapton – lead guitar; Stewart – piano; Winwood – organ; Wyman – bass; Watts – drums.
12. "Rockin' Daddy" (alternate mix) – 3:58 (recorded May 4, 1970)
  - Wolf – vocal; Sumlin – rhythm guitar; Clapton – lead guitar; Stewart – piano; Upchurch – bass; Watts – drums.

== Charts ==
Chart (1971)	Peak position
US Billboard 200	79
US Billboard R&B Albums	28

Chart (2003)	Peak position
US Billboard Blues Albums	6
