= Big City Blues =

Big City Blues may refer to:

- Big City Blues (1932 film), a 1932 drama film directed by Mervyn LeRoy
- Big City Blues (1997 film), a 1997 film starring Burt Reynolds
- Big City Blues (2:00 AM Paradise Cafe#Track listing), a 1984 song by Barry Manilow
- Howling Wolf Sings the Blues, re-released in 1970 by United Records as Big City Blues
