= The Real Folk Blues (Howlin' Wolf album) =

Compilation album by Howlin' Wolf
- Released: 1965
- Recorded: Chicago, July 19, 1956 – April 15, 1965
- Genre: Blues
- Length: 32:39
- Label: Chess
- Compiler: Marshall Chess

Howlin' Wolf chronology
Howling Wolf Sings the Blues (1962)	The Real Folk Blues (1965)	More Real Folk Blues (1967)

The Real Folk Blues is a compilation album by blues musician Howlin' Wolf, which was released by Chess Records in 1965. The album's songs, which were originally issued as singles, were recorded in Chicago between 1956 and 1965.

== Reception ==
Professional ratings
Review scores
Source	Rating
AllMusic	4.5/5 stars
Select	4/5 medals

A review by AllMusic states: "In the mid-'60s, Chess Records released a great series of compilations of '40s and '50s singles by some of its best blues artists, all of them called The Real Folk Blues. The Howlin' Wolf entry is possibly the best of the batch, and one of the best introductions to this mercurial electric bluesman. Opening with the savage 'Killing Floor,' the album doesn't let up in intensity, and it happily focuses on Wolf's less-anthologized sides, which gives the album a freshness a lot of blues compilations lack".

== Track listing ==
All compositions credited to Chester Burnett except where noted

1. "Killing Floor" – 2:48
2. "Louise" – 2:42
3. "Poor Boy" – 2:32
4. "Sittin' on Top of the World" – 2:30
5. "Nature" – 2:45
6. "My Country Suga Mama" – 2:34
7. "Tail Dragger" (Willie Dixon) – 2:56
8. "Three Hundred Pounds of Joy" (Dixon) – 2:59
9. "The Natchez Burnin'" – 2:10
10. "Built for Comfort" (Dixon) – 2:30
11. "Ooh Baby, Hold Me" – 2:35
12. "Tell Me What I've Done" – 2:47
- Recorded in Chicago on July 19, 1956 (track 9), June 24, 1957 (track 5), December 1957 (tracks 3 & 4), September 28, 1962 (track 7), August 14, 1963 (tracks 8 & 10), August 1964 (track 1, 2 & 6) and April 15, 1965 (tracks 11 & 12)

== Personnel ==
- Howlin' Wolf – vocals, harmonica, guitar
- J. T. Brown (track 7, 8 & 10), Adolph 'Billy' Duncan (track 5), Arnold Rogers (tracks 1, 2 & 6), Eddie Shaw (tracks 11 & 12) – tenor saxophone
- Donald Hankins – baritone saxophone (tracks 8 & 10)
- Lee Eggleston (tracks 11 & 12), Johnny Jones (tracks 1, 2, 6 & 7), Hosea Lee Kennard (tracks 3–5 & 9), Lafayette Leake (tracks 8 & 10), Otis Spann (track 9) – piano
- Buddy Guy (tracks 8 & 10–12), Willie Johnson (tracks 5 & 9), Otis "Big Smokey" Smothers (tracks 5 & 9), Hubert Sumlin (tracks 1–4, 6–8 & 10–12) – guitar
- Jerome Arnold (track 7, 8 & 10), Willie Dixon (tracks 5 & 9), Alfred Elkins (tracks 3 & 4), Andrew Palmer (tracks 1, 2 & 6), Andrew "Blueblood" McMahon – bass
- Junior Blackmon (tracks 1, 2, 6 & 7), Earl Phillips (tracks 3–5 & 9), Sam Lay (tracks 8 & 10–12) – drums
