= The Back Door Wolf =

Studio album by Howlin' Wolf
- Released: 1973
- Recorded: August 14 & 17, 1973
- Studio: Chess Recording, Chicago
- Genre: Blues
- Length: 39:06
- Label: Chess
- Producer: Ralph Bass

Howlin' Wolf chronology
Live and Cookin' (1972)	The Back Door Wolf (1973)	London Revisited (1974)

The Back Door Wolf is the final studio album by blues musician Howlin' Wolf, released by Chess Records in 1973.

== Reception ==
Professional ratings
Review scores
Source	Rating
AllMusic	3/5 stars
The Penguin Guide to Blues Recordings	3/4 stars

In a retrospective AllMusic review, critic Cub Koda wrote: "This, Wolf's last hurrah, is his final studio album. Cut with his regular working band, the Wolf Gang, everything here works well ... Not the place to start a Wolf collection by any means, but a great place to end up".

== Track listing ==
All compositions credited to Chester Burnett except where noted

1. "Moving" – 2:44
2. "Coon on the Moon" (Eddie Shaw) – 3:44
3. "Speak Now Woman" (James Oden) – 4:50
4. "Trying to Forget You" (Shaw) – 3:33
5. "Stop Using Me" – 2:52
6. "Leave Here Walking" (Shaw) – 2:30
7. "The Back Door Wolf" (Shaw, Ralph Bass) – 4:02
8. "You Turn Slick on Me" (Emery Williams Jr.) – 4:50
9. "The Watergate Blues" (Shaw) – 3:10
10. "Can't Stay Here" (Andrew McMahon) – 2:31

Additional track on CD reissue

11. "Speak Now Woman" [Alternate take] (Oden) – 4:20

== Personnel ==
- Howlin' Wolf – vocals, harmonica
- Eddie Shaw – tenor saxophone (track 7)
- Detroit Junior – piano, harpsichord
- Hubert Sumlin, Willie Williams – guitar
- Andrew "Blueblood" McMahon, James Green – bass
- S. P. Leary – drums
