= Message to the Young =

Studio album by Howlin' Wolf
- Released: March 16, 1971
- Recorded: September 1970 & October 6, 1970
- Studio: Ter Mar Recording, Chicago
- Genre: Blues
- Length: 30:57
- Label: Chess
- Producer: Cash McCall, Sonny Thompson

Howlin' Wolf chronology
The Howlin' Wolf Album (1969)	Message to the Young (1971)	The London Howlin' Wolf Sessions (1971)

Message to the Young is the eighth album by blues musician Howlin' Wolf released by Chess Records in 1971.

== Reception ==
Professional ratings
Review scores
Source	Rating
AllMusic	2/5 stars

Cash McCall stated "I did an album on Howlin’ Wolf that didn't work out too well, I didn't know the man couldn't read and that was Message To The Young. I produced that and Wolf didn't have any respect for me, as I was so young".

== Track listing ==
All compositions by Sarah Lewis and Sonny Thompson except where noted

1. "If I Were a Bird" (Morris Dollison) – 4:34
2. "I Smell a Rat" – 2:15
3. "Miss James" – 3:27
4. "Message to the Young" (Thompson, Ralph Bass) – 5:50
5. "She's Looking Good" (Roger Collins) – 2:40
6. "Just As Long" – 3:42
7. "Romance Without Finance" – 3:22
8. "Turn Me On" – 4:32

== Personnel ==
- Howlin' Wolf – vocals, harmonica
- Sonny Thompson – piano, arranger, conductor
- John Jeremiah – organ
- Bryce Roberson, Jon Stocklin – guitar
- Bob Crowder – bass
- Tyrone Smith – drums
- Cash McCall – arranger, conductor
- Unidentified horn section and vocalists
