= Howlin' Wolf (album) =

Compilation album by Howlin' Wolf
- Released: January 11, 1962
- Recorded: 1959–1962
- Genre: Chicago blues
- Length: 31:57
- Label: Chess
- Producer: Ralph Bass

Howlin' Wolf chronology
Moanin' in the Moonlight (1959)	Howlin' Wolf (1962)	Howling Wolf Sings the Blues (1962)

Singles from Howlin' Wolf
- 1. "Tell Me" Released: February 10, 1960; 2. "Spoonful" Released: July 18, 1960; 3. "Wang Dang Doodle / Back Door Man" Released: January 24, 1961; 4. "Down in the Bottom" Released: June 8, 1961; 5. "Little Red Rooster" Released: October 1961; 6. "You'll Be Mine" Released: February 1962

Professional ratings
Review scores
Source	Rating
AllMusic	4.5/5 stars
The Encyclopedia of Popular Music	5/5 stars
Mojo	4/5 stars
Rolling Stone	5/5 stars

Howlin' Wolf is the second album from the Chicago blues singer/guitarist/harmonicist, Howlin' Wolf. Released in 1962, it is a collection of twelve Chess singles that they previously released between June, 1957 and December, 1961 . Because of the illustration on its sleeve (by Don S. Bronstein), the album is often called The Rockin' Chair Album, a nickname even added to the cover on some reissue pressings of the LP.

== Legacy and awards ==
In 1966, fellow Chess artist Koko Taylor recorded a cover version of "Wang Dang Doodle", which reached No.4 on the Billboard's R&B Charts and became a minor crossover hit by making No.58 on the Billboard Hot 100. In 1963, Sam Cooke released a single of "Little Red Rooster", reaching No.7 on the R&B Singles chart and No.11 on the Hot 100. In 1964, The Rolling Stones also released "Little Red Rooster" as a single, which became the first and only time that a blues record reached No.1 in the UK Singles Chart (see Little Red Rooster#Rolling Stones version). In 1966, Cream recorded "Spoonful" on their debut album Fresh Cream and included a live, 17-minute version on their 1968 album, Wheels of Fire. In 1967, The Doors included a cover of "Back Door Man" on their debut LP, and in 1969, both "Shake for Me" and "Back Door Man" were used in the lyrics to the Led Zeppelin song "Whole Lotta Love." The Rolling Stones also included a cover of "Little Baby" on their 1995 album, Stripped (Rolling Stones album).

In 1985, the album won a Blues Music Award by The Blues Foundation for 'Classics of Blues Recordings—Album'. In 2012, the album was ranked No. 238 on Rolling Stone magazine's list of the 500 greatest albums of all time and described as "an outrageous set of sex songs written by Willie Dixon." It was named the third greatest guitar album of all time by Mojo magazine in 2004.

== Reissue ==
In 1984, this album was reissued by Chess as CH-9183. The cover picture was changed slightly adding an elliptical logo beneath the album title that reads "CHICAGO 26 Golden years Single Album" and the "Chess LP 1469" trademark was replaced with the "CH-9183" identifier.

== Track listing ==
All tracks composed by Willie Dixon; except where indicated

Side one

1. "Shake for Me" – 2:12
2. "The Red Rooster" – 2:22
3. "You'll Be Mine" – 2:25
4. "Who's Been Talkin'" (Howlin' Wolf) – 2:18
5. "Wang Dang Doodle" – 2:18
6. "Little Baby" – 2:45

Side two

1. "Spoonful" – 2:42
2. "Going Down Slow" (St. Louis Jimmy Oden) – 3:18
3. "Down in the Bottom" – 2:05
4. "Back Door Man" – 2:45
5. "Howlin' for My Darlin'" – 2:28
6. "Tell Me" (Howlin' Wolf) – 2:52

== Personnel ==
Performers

- Howlin' Wolf – lead vocals, guitar, harmonica
- William Johnson – guitar
- Freddy Robinson – guitar
- Jimmy Rogers – guitar
- Otis "Big Smokey" Smothers – guitar
- Hubert Sumlin – guitar
- Jody Williams – guitar
- Henry Gray – piano
- Johnny Jones – piano
- Hosea Lee Kennard – piano
- Lafayette Leake – piano
- Otis Spann – piano
- Willie Dixon – bass, vocals on “Going Down Slow”
- Buddy Guy – bass
- Fred Below – drums
- Junior Blackman – drums
- Sam Lay – drums
- S.P. Leary – drums
- Sammy Lewis – drums
- Earl Phillips – drums
- J. T. Brown – saxophone
- Donald Hankins – baritone saxophone
- Arnold Rogers – tenor saxophone

Production

- Ralph Bass – producer, sleeve notes
- Ron Malo – engineer
- Don S. Bronstein – cover art, photography
