= Goin' Down Slow =

Blues standard written by St. Louis Jimmy Oden

"Going Down Slow"

Single by St. Louis Jimmy
- A-side: "Monkey Face Blues"
- Released: 1942
- Recorded: Chicago, November 11, 1941
- Genre: Blues
- Length: 3:10
- Label: Bluebird
- Songwriter: James B. Oden a.k.a. St. Louis Jimmy

"Goin' Down Slow" or "Going Down Slow" is a blues song composed by American blues singer St. Louis Jimmy Oden. It is considered a blues standard and "one of the most famous blues of all".

"Goin' Down Slow" has been recorded by many blues and other artists, including a noteworthy version by Howlin' Wolf with narration by Willie Dixon. A rendition by Bobby Bland was a hit in both the Billboard Hot 100 and R&B charts.

== Original song ==
"Goin' Down Slow" "is the lament of a high-roller who is dying":

I have had my fun, if I don't get well no more (2×)
My health is failing me, and now I'm going down slow
Please write my mother, tell her the shape I'm in (2×)
Tell her to pray for me, forgive me for my sin

The song is a moderately slow-tempo twelve-bar blues, notated in 4/4 or common time in the key of B. Oden, as St. Louis Jimmy, recorded it in Chicago on November 11, 1941. It was released as a single by Bluebird Records and featured Oden's vocal with accompaniment by Roosevelt Sykes on piano and Alfred Elkins on "imitation" bass.

"Goin' Down Slow" was Oden's most famous song and he later recorded several versions, including in 1955 for Parrot Records and in 1960 for Bluesville Records. He and Sykes continued their musical partnership well into the 1960s.

== Howlin' Wolf version ==
Howlin' Wolf recorded "Goin' Down Slow" for Chess Records in 1961. Wolf (vocal and guitar) recorded the song as a Chicago blues, with Henry Gray (piano), Hubert Sumlin and Jimmy Rogers (guitars), Willie Dixon (bass), and Sam Lay (drums). Dixon also provided a spoken narrative, alternating with Wolf's vocal passages:

Now looka here, I did not say I was a millionaire
But I said I have spent more money than a millionaire
'Cause if I had'a kept all the money that I'd already spent
I would've been a millionaire a long time ago
And women? Great Googly-Moogly!

It was released in 1961 as a single between his "Little Red Rooster" and "I Ain't Superstitious" releases and included on his second compilation album Howlin' Wolf a.k.a. Rocking Chair Album in 1962. Wolf re-recorded the song in 1970 during The London Howlin' Wolf Sessions with Eric Clapton (guitar), Klaus Voormann (bass), Ringo Starr (drums), and Jeffery Carp (harmonica), which released as a bonus track in 2003.

== Recognition and legacy ==
In 2002, St. Louis Jimmy Oden's "Goin' Down Slow" was inducted into the Blues Foundation Hall of Fame in the "Classics of Blues Recordings – Singles or Album Tracks" category. Writing for AllMusic, critic Bill Dahl notes "Few blues songs have stood the test of time as enduringly as 'Goin' Down Slow'." In 1974, a rendition by Bobby Bland was released as a single and reached the Billboard charts, peaking at number 17 (R&B) and number 69 (Hot 100).
