= Live and Cookin' =

Live album by Howlin' Wolf
- Released: 1972
- Recorded: January 26, 1972
- Venue: Alice's Revisited, Chicago
- Genre: Blues
- Label: Chess
- Producer: Ralph Bass

Howlin' Wolf chronology
| The London Howlin' Wolf Sessions (1971) | Live and Cookin' (1972) | The Back Door Wolf (1973) |

Live and Cookin', subtitled at Alice's Revisited, is a live album by blues musician Howlin' Wolf, released by Chess Records in 1972.

== Reception ==
Professional ratings
Review scores
| Source | Rating |
|---|---|
| AllMusic | 3/5 stars |
| The Penguin Guide to Blues Recordings | 3/4 stars |

AllMusic reviewer Cub Koda wrote: "The 1972 live album Live and Cookin' at Alice's Revisited is a great document of Wolf toward the end, still capable of bringing the heat and rocking the house down to the last brick".

== Track listing ==
All compositions credited to Chester Burnett except where noted

1. "When I Laid Down I Was Troubled" – 7:44
2. "I Didn't Know" – 5:58
3. "Mean Mistreater" (McKinley Morganfield) – 6:51
4. "I Had a Dream" – 4:58
5. "Call Me the Wolf" – 5:45
6. "Don't Laugh at Me" – 5:07
7. "Just Passing By" – 5:20
8. "Sitting on Top of the World" – 8:03

Additional tracks on CD reissue

9. "The Big House" – 7:38
10. "Mr. Airplane Man" – 7:31

== Personnel ==
- Howlin' Wolf – vocals, harmonica
- Eddie Shaw – tenor saxophone
- Albert Luandrew – piano
- Hubert Sumlin, Willie Williams – guitar
- David Myers – bass
- Fred Below – drums
