= Bobby King (musician) =

American blues guitarist, singer and songwriter

- Born: Robert L. King; January 29, 1941; Jefferson County, Arkansas, United States
- Died: July 22, 1983 (aged 42) Chicago, Illinois, United States
- Genres: Chicago blues
- Occupations: Guitarist, singer, songwriter
- Instruments: Guitar, vocals
- Years active: Early 1960s–1983

Robert L. King (January 29, 1941 – July 22, 1983) was an American Chicago blues guitarist, singer and songwriter. King worked with Hank Ballard and The Midnighters, Bobby Bland, Lee "Shot" Williams, Eddy Clearwater, Freddie King, Lonnie Johnson, The Aces and Sonny Thompson. Although he may be better remembered as a session musician, between 1962 and 1975, King recorded four singles and one album.

Following a violent altercation in a Chicago nightclub, King died from his injuries at the age of 42.

== Biography ==
Bobby King was born in Jefferson County, Arkansas, United States. He was inspired by the work of Fenton Robinson and Larry Davis, before his relocation to Chicago, Illinois, following a short spell in 1959 in St. Louis, Missouri. He became a local favorite largely operating in the West Side, Chicago blues clubs, before his second single, "What a Day, What a Night" (1964), brought him to a larger audience.

King's jazz styled guitar work saw him used as a session musician, recording behind blues musicians such as Lee "Shot" Williams, Eddy Clearwater and Freddie King. He also toured, backing both Bobby Bland and Hank Ballard. His debut single, "Thanks Mr. Postman", an answer song to "Please Mr. Postman", had been released by Federal Records in 1962. Two other singles followed on small local labels, but none attracted tangible sales.

In 1975, his debut album release, Chaser, a live recording, was issued on the French label MCM Records. King wrote two of the songs, including the title track. In 1977, an article on King appeared in the Blues Unlimited magazine.

King planned to undertake a tour of Europe and Japan, but a violent quarrel arose at Louise's, a Chicago club, which left King badly injured and unable to play the guitar. He subsequently died from his wounds on July 22, 1983. An obituary appeared in Living Blues magazine (issue No. 58) later that year.

King's work has appeared on a number of compilation albums. These include King New Breed Rhythm & Blues (2002) which incorporated "Thanks Mr. Postman", R&B Hipshakers Vol. 3: Just a Little Bit of the Jumpin' Bean (2012), and The R & B Singles Collection Volume 2 (2013).

== Discography ==
=== Singles ===
Year	A-side	B-side	Record label
1962	"Thanks Mr. Postman"	"Two Telephones"	Federal Records
1964	"What a Day, What a Night"	"W-A-S-T-E-D"	Federal Records
1968	"Froggy Bottom Pt. 1"	"Froggy Bottom Pt. 2"	Weis Records
1973	"Let Me Come on Home"	"What Made You Change Your Mind"	Sound Plus Records

=== Albums ===
Year	Title	Record label	Notes
1975	Chaser	MCM Records	A live album recorded at Queen Bee's Lounge, Chicago, on October 9, 1975

NB. Chaser contained two King compositions, including the title track; otherwise the tracks are mainly covers of blues standards. It was re-released on CD on Storyville Records (1998)

== See also ==
- List of Chicago blues musicians
