= Wang Dang Doodle =

Song written by Willie Dixon

Single by Howlin' Wolf

from the album Howlin' Wolf
- B-side: "Back Door Man"
- Released: 1961
- Recorded: 1960
- Studio: Chess, Chicago
- Genre: Blues
- Length: 2:20
- Label: Chess
- Songwriter: Willie Dixon
- Producers: Leonard Chess; Phil Chess; Willie Dixon

Howlin' Wolf singles chronology
"Spoonful" (1960)	"Wang Dang Doodle" (1961)	"Down in the Bottom" (1961)

"Wang Dang Doodle" is a blues song written by Willie Dixon. Music critic Mike Rowe calls it a party song in an urban style with its massive, rolling, exciting beat. It was first recorded by Howlin' Wolf in 1960 and released by Chess Records in 1961. In 1965, Dixon and Leonard Chess persuaded Koko Taylor to record it for Checker Records, a Chess subsidiary. Taylor's rendition quickly became a hit, reaching number thirteen on the Billboard R&B chart and number 58 on the pop chart. "Wang Dang Doodle" became a blues standard and has been recorded by various artists. Taylor's version was added to the United States National Recording Registry in 2023.

== Composition and lyrics ==
"Wang Dang Doodle" was composed by Willie Dixon during the second part of his songwriting career, from 1959 to 1964. During this period, he wrote many of his best-known songs, including "Back Door Man", "Spoonful", "The Red Rooster" (better-known as "Little Red Rooster"), "I Ain't Superstitious", "You Shook Me", "You Need Love" (adapted by Led Zeppelin for "Whole Lotta Love"), and "You Can't Judge a Book by the Cover". In his autobiography, Dixon explained that the phrase "wang dang doodle" "meant a good time, especially if the guy came in from the South. A wang dang meant having a ball and a lot of dancing, they called it a rocking style so that's what it meant to wang dang doodle". Mike Rowe claimed that Dixon's song is based on "an old lesbian song" – "The Bull Daggers Ball" – with "its catalogue of low-life characters only marginally less colourful that the original". Dixon claimed that he wrote it when he first heard Howlin' Wolf in 1951 or 1952 but that it was "too far in advance" for him and he saved it for later. However, Wolf supposedly hated the song and commented, "Man, that's too old-timey, sound[s] like some old levee camp number":

Tell Automatic slim, to tell razor totin' Jim
To tell butcher knife totin' Annie, to tell fast talkin' Fannie ...
We gonna pitch a wang dang doodle all night long

Howlin' Wolf recorded the song in June 1960 in Chicago during the same sessions that produced "Back Door Man" and "Spoonful". Backing Howlin' Wolf on vocals are Otis Spann on piano, Hubert Sumlin on guitar, Dixon on bass, and Fred Below on drums. Freddy King has been identified as possibly a second guitarist. In 1961, Chess issued the song as the B-side to "Back Door Man"; neither song appeared on the record charts. Both songs are included on Howlin' Wolf's popular 1962 compilation album Howlin' Wolf, also called The Rockin' Chair Album, and many subsequent compilations. He later re-recorded it with Sumlin (rhythm guitar), Jeffrey Carp (harmonica), Eric Clapton (lead guitar), Ian Stewart (piano), Bill Wyman (bass) and Charlie Watts (drums) for The London Howlin' Wolf Sessions (1971). The re-recording is at a slower tempo than both the original and the Koko Taylor hit version and includes a new guitar riff not heard in those earlier versions.

== Koko Taylor version ==
On June 30, 1964, Willie Dixon brought Koko Taylor to Chess Records, where she recorded "What Kind of Man Is That?". During her next session, on December 7, 1965, she recorded "Wang Dang Doodle". Backing vocalist Taylor were Gene Barge and Donald Hawkins on saxophones, Lafayette Leake on piano, Buddy Guy and Johnny "Twist" Williams on guitars, Jack Meyers on bass guitar, Fred Below on drums, and Willie Dixon singing with Taylor. Her version was released in early 1966 and peaked at number four on Billboard magazine's R&B singles chart and number 58 on the Hot 100.

== Recognition and legacy ==
In 1995, Taylor's rendition was inducted into the Blues Foundation Hall of Fame in the "Classics of Blues Recording – Singles or Album Tracks" category. The Foundation noted that the song was the last blues single produced by Dixon to reach the record charts, and "became Koko Taylor's signature crowdpleaser, inspiring singalongs to the 'all night long' refrain night after night".

Taylor's version of "Wang Dang Doodle" was selected by the Library of Congress for preservation in the National Recording Registry in 2023.

Chuck Berry, Bruce Hornsby, John Popper, Bob Weir of the Grateful Dead and Willie Dixon's daughter, Shirley Dixon, performed "Wang Dang Doodle" in tribute to Willie Dixon at the 1994 Rock & Roll Hall of Fame induction ceremony.

Love Sculpture recorded a version for their 1968 album Blues Helping. An AllMusic album review noted "what makes this album worthwhile is the revved-up guitar playing, especially when Edmunds shreds both Freddy King's 'The Stumble' and Willie Dixon's 'Wang Dang Doodle'".

In 1971, a version by Savoy Brown was recorded for their album Street Corner Talking. It was the group's first album after a nearly complete lineup change and their rendition was described in an album review as one of the "solid examples of the group's blues-rock power ... a slick cover".

The Pointer Sisters' version of "Wang Dang Doodle" was released as the follow-up single to "Yes We Can Can" and was included on their 1973 self-titled debut album. The single peaked at number 24 on Billboard's Hot Soul Singles and number 61 on its Hot 100 charts.

Filmmaker Ryan Coogler stated the song was an influence on his 2025 film Sinners. The song was additionally covered for the soundtrack.
