= Andrew "Blueblood" McMahon =

American Chicago blues musician

- Born: April 12, 1926; Delhi, Louisiana, United States
- Died: February 17, 1984 (aged 57) Monroe, Louisiana, United States
- Genres: Chicago blues
- Occupations: Guitarist, singer, songwriter
- Instruments: Bass guitar, vocals
- Years active: Early 1950s–1984

Andrew "Blueblood" McMahon (April 12, 1926 – February 17, 1984) was an American Chicago blues bass guitarist, singer and songwriter. McMahon played bass guitar in Howlin' Wolf's backing ensemble for over a decade. He also backed a number of other Chicago-based blues musicians on record. His own best known tracks are "Lost in the Jungle", "Special Agent", "Potato Diggin' Man", and "Worried All the Time", which have appeared on several compilation albums.

== Biography ==
Andrew "Blueblood" McMahon was born in Delhi, Louisiana, United States. He relocated to Chicago, Illinois, in 1949, and commenced performing in the blues clubs across that city from the early 1950s.

McMahon first started playing in Howlin' Wolf's backing band in 1960, and his recording career with Wolf ran between 1964 and 1973. That tenure saw McMahon play bass on Wolf's single, "Killing Floor" (1964), and on his albums, The Real Folk Blues (1966) and The Back Door Wolf (1973).

In 1960, McMahon supplied bass guitar to Morris Pejoe's single release "She Walked Right In". Another early recording outside of Wolf's tutelage was playing bass guitar on Freddy Young's single, "Someday Baby" (1964).

In 1973, McMahon recorded his debut solo album, Blueblood, in Chicago, which was released by Dharma Records. His backing musicians on the recording included Homesick James, Hubert Sumlin, and Sunnyland Slim. He released the accompanying single, "Guitar King" / "Short Mini Dress", also on Dharma. However, his subsequent solo career did not take off.

In 1977, his second album release, Go Get My Baby, a live recording, was issued on the French record label MCM Records. It had been recorded the previous November, over two nights, three days apart, at a couple of Chicago blues clubs. Aron Burton played the bass guitar on a number of tracks, to allow McMahon to concentrate on his singing. Other musicians who performed on the recordings were the guitarists Jimmy Dawkins and John Littlejohn. McMahon wrote five of the fourteen tracks on the recording, which also had blues standards such as "It Hurts Me Too", "Got My Mojo Working", and "Little Red Rooster".

Some of his live work appeared in the compilation album, The Chicago Blues Box 2, issued by Storyville Records, plus four of his studio recordings were incorporated on another compilation, Cadillac Baby's Bea & Baby Records: The Definitive Collection.

McMahon died in Monroe, Louisiana, in February 1984, at the age of 57. An obituary appeared in Living Blues magazine (issue No. 59) later that year.

== Solo discography ==
Year	Title	Record label
1973	Blueblood	Dharma Records
1977	Go Get My Baby	MCM Records

== See also ==
- List of Chicago blues musicians
