= Jacques and Marcelle Morgantini =

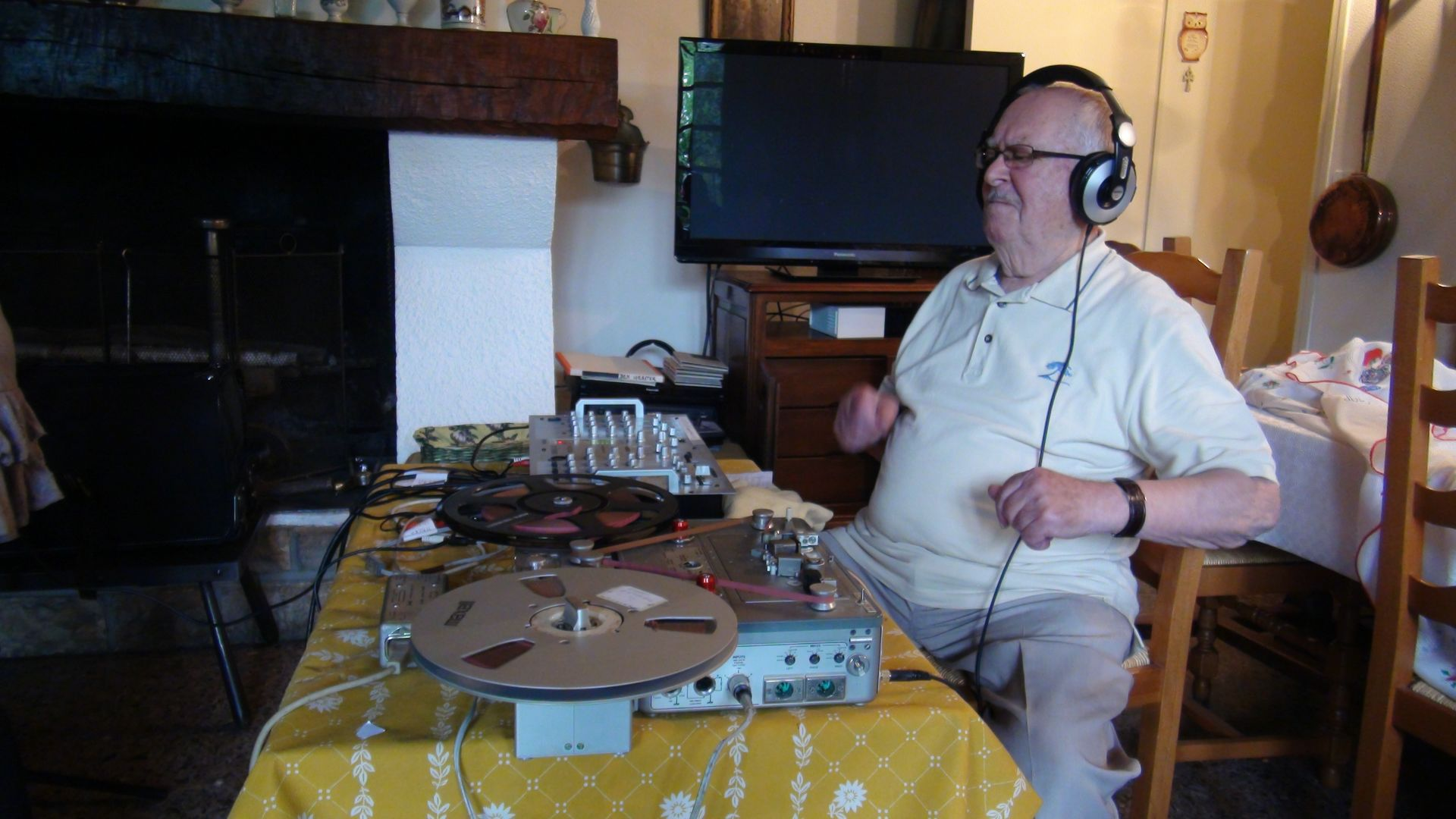

Jacques Morgantini (21 February 1924 – 2 December 2019) and Marcelle Morgantini (née Chailleux, 7 April 1925 – 23 September 2007) were French record producers and promoters of American blues music.

== Biography ==
Jacques Morgantini was born in Montbéliard, eastern France in 1924. He became a jazz fan after hearing his father's records, and while studying chemistry in Toulouse organised a conference on jazz music addressed by Hugues Panassié, the influential critic who was the president of the Hot Club de France. Panassié invited Morgantini to become vice-president of the Hot Club, and in 1945 Morgantini set up the Hot Club de Pau. He started developing a network of contacts in the U.S., which provided a basis for him to invite American jazz and blues performers to perform in France. In 1951, with the support of the Hot Club of France, he invited Big Bill Broonzy to perform in the country.

He worked as a salesman for an electrical company, and met Marcelle Chailleux at a conference he organised in Pau to discuss blues music. Marcelle, born in Sarthe, had been a fan of classical music but was drawn by the emotional power of the blues. They married in 1963.

Through Jean-Marie Monastier, the owner of a record store in Bordeaux and later the founder of the Black & Blue record label, they invited further groups of blues musicians to play in France, including the Chicago Blues Festival tours managed by Monastier which featured such musicians as Muddy Waters, John Lee Hooker, T-Bone Walker, Memphis Slim and Koko Taylor . Some of the musicians, including John Lee Hooker and Memphis Slim, were recorded by the Morgantinis, either in their studio at their home in Gan, or in live performance, and their albums were released by Black & Blue.

The Morgantinis became friends with many of the performers, notably Jimmy Dawkins and Fred Below, who told them that several leading blues performers in Chicago had never been recorded. With their son Luc, Jacques and Marcelle Morgantini travelled to Chicago in the early 1970s, where they were guided around clubs by Dawkins, Below and Andrew "Big Voice" Odom. In 1975, Marcelle and Luc, together with Monastier, returned to Chicago determined to record struggling performers. She set up her own label, MCM Records, the name deriving from her initials, and on two trips in 1975 recorded club performances by Willie Kent, Willie James Lyons, The Aces, Jimmy Johnson, Luther "Guitar Junior" Johnson, and Bobby King. The following year, she recorded Dawkins, Odom, Eddy Clearwater, Magic Slim, John Littlejohn, Hip Linkchain, and Andrew "Blueblood" McMahon. Her final visit to Chicago clubs in 1977 resulted in recordings by Jimmy Johnson and Robert "Big Mojo" Elem, but in 1978 financial difficulties led to the closure of the MCM label.

Marcelle Morgantini's set of recordings was described by blues expert Stuart Constable as "a remarkable body of work, not only for the moment in blues history that it captures, but also because of the quality of the sound and the unique character of the performances. The blues was in transit at the time these recordings were made. In the work of Jimmy Dawkins, Magic Slim and Willie James Lyons, you can hear the seeds of blues-rock being sown. At the same time, there is much to bring joy to the hearts of Chicago traditionalists...". Many of the MCM recordings were later released on CD by Storyville Records.

Jacques Morgantini supervised many of the releases on the Black & Blue label. He wrote articles on the music, and liner notes, and helped launch the RCA France "Black and White" blues series, many drawing on his own record collection. He produced the Jazz Forever and Blues Forever series of CDs in the 1980s, before creating a series of compilation CDs for the EPM label and for Frémeaux & Associés as well as the Riverboat series of albums of jump blues musicians.

Marcelle Morgantini died in Gan in 2007, aged 82. Jacques Morgantini continued to record blues musicians, organise concerts, work as a music critic, and present radio programmes of jazz and blues. He received a Keeping The Blues Alive Award in 2017 from the Blues Foundation in Memphis, Tennessee. He died in 2019, aged 95.
