= Detroit Junior =

American blues singer and musician (1931–2005)

- Born: Emery Williams Jr. October 26, 1931; Haynes, Arkansas, U.S.
- Origin: Detroit, Michigan, U.S.
- Died: August 9, 2005 (aged 73) Chicago, Illinois, U.S.
- Genres: Chicago blues; electric blues
- Occupations: musician; songwriter
- Instruments: piano; vocals
- Years active: 1950s–2005

Emery Williams Jr. (October 26, 1931 – August 9, 2005), known as Detroit Junior, was an American blues pianist, vocalist and songwriter. He is known for songs such as "So Unhappy", "Call My Job", "If I Hadn't Been High", "Ella" and "Money Tree". His songs have been covered by Koko Taylor, Albert King and other blues artists.

== Career ==
Born in Haynes, Arkansas, Williams recorded his first single, "Money Tree", with the Bea & Baby label in 1960. His first full album, Chicago Urban Blues, was released in the early 1970s on the Blues on Blues label. He also has recordings on Alligator, Blue Suit, The Sirens Records, and Delmark.

Williams began his career in Detroit, Michigan, backing touring musicians such as Eddie Boyd, John Lee Hooker, and Amos Milburn. Boyd brought him to Chicago in 1956, where he spent the next twelve years. In the early 1970s, Williams toured and recorded with Howlin' Wolf. After the death of Wolf in 1976, Williams returned to Chicago, where he lived and performed until his death from heart failure in 2005. He was a weekly regular at Chicago blues clubs B.L.U.E.S. and Kingston Mines.

== Discography ==
=== Albums ===
Year	Title	Record label
1990	Chicago Urban Blues	Mango
1995	Turn Up the Heat	Blue Suit
1997	Take Out the Time	Blue Suit
2003	8 Hands on 88 Keys - Chicago Blues Piano Masters	The Sirens Records
2004	Live at the Toledo Museum of Art	Blue Suit
2004	Blues on the Internet	Delmark
