= White Station, Mississippi =

- Unincorporated community
- Location within Mississippi Location within the United States
- Coordinates: 33°39′37″N 88°37′15″W
- Country: United States
- State: Mississippi
- County: Clay
- Elevation: 256 ft (78 m)
- Time zone: UTC-6 (Central (CST))
  - Summer (DST): UTC-5 (CDT)
- Area code: 662
- GNIS feature ID: 679631

White Station (also known as White or Whites) is a small unincorporated community located in Clay County, Mississippi, United States. The community is north of West Point.

White Station is the birthplace of blues musician Howlin' Wolf.
