= Howling Wolf Sings the Blues =

Compilation album by Howlin' Wolf
- Released: 1962
- Recorded: September 1951; October 2, 1951; February 12, 1952
- Studio: KWEM Radio Station, West Memphis, Arkansas
- Genre: Blues
- Length: 30:08
- Label: Crown
- Producer: Joe Bihari

Howlin' Wolf chronology
Howlin' Wolf (1962)	Howling Wolf Sings the Blues (1962)	The Real Folk Blues (1965)

Howling Wolf Sings the Blues is a compilation album by blues musician Howlin' Wolf, which was released by Crown Records in 1962. The original album included eight songs recorded for Modern Records between 1951 and 1952, including those tracks that were released as singles by the RPM, and an additional two instrumentals by Joe Hill Louis. The album was re-released in 1970 by United Records with the alternative title Big City Blues.

== Reception ==
AllMusic reviewer Richie Unterberger called it: "groundbreaking early electric blues, though not quite up to the peaks he'd scale with his best Chess sessions of the mid-'50s to the mid-'60s. The electric guitar had rarely been recorded with as much fuzzy power as it was here, for one thing, and Howlin' Wolf's vocals were already possessed of magnificent, sometimes scary intensity ... This has almost everything Howlin' Wolf cut for Modern in the early '50s, and is thus an essential supplement to his more celebrated Chess catalog for the serious fan".

== Track listing ==
All compositions credited to Chester Burnett except where noted

=== Original LP ===
1. "Riding in the Moonlight" (Burnett, Jules Taub) – 3:06
2. "Worried About My Baby" – 3:00
3. "Crying at Daylight" – 3:56
4. "Brown Skin Woman" – 2:43
5. "Twisting and Turning" (Joe Hill Louis) – 3:09
6. "House Rockin' Boogie" (Burnett, Joe Josea) – 4:12
7. "Keep What You Got" – 2:24
8. "Dog Me Around" – 2:45
9. "Morning at Midnight" – 2:43
10. "Backslide Boogie" (Louis) – 3:02

Additional tracks on CD reissue

11. "My Baby Stole Off" – 3:03
12. "I Want Your Picture" – 2:51
13. "Passing by Blues" – 2:43
14. "Driving This Highway" – 2:55
15. "The Sun Is Rising" – 2:45
16. "Stealing My Clothes (My Friends)" – 3:03
17. "I'm the Wolf" – 3:06

Recorded in West Memphis at KWEM Radio Station in September 1951 (tracks 1 & 7–9), October 2, 1951 (tracks 3, 11 & 12), and in West Memphis on February 12, 1952 (tracks 2, 4, 6 & 13–16)

== Personnel ==
- Howlin' Wolf – guitar, vocals, harmonica
- Ike Turner – piano
- Willie Johnson – guitar, bass
- Willie Steel – drums

Tracks 5 & 10:

- Joe Hill Louis – vocals, guitar, harmonica, drums
