= Howlin' Wolf =

American blues singer, guitarist and harmonica player (1910–1976)

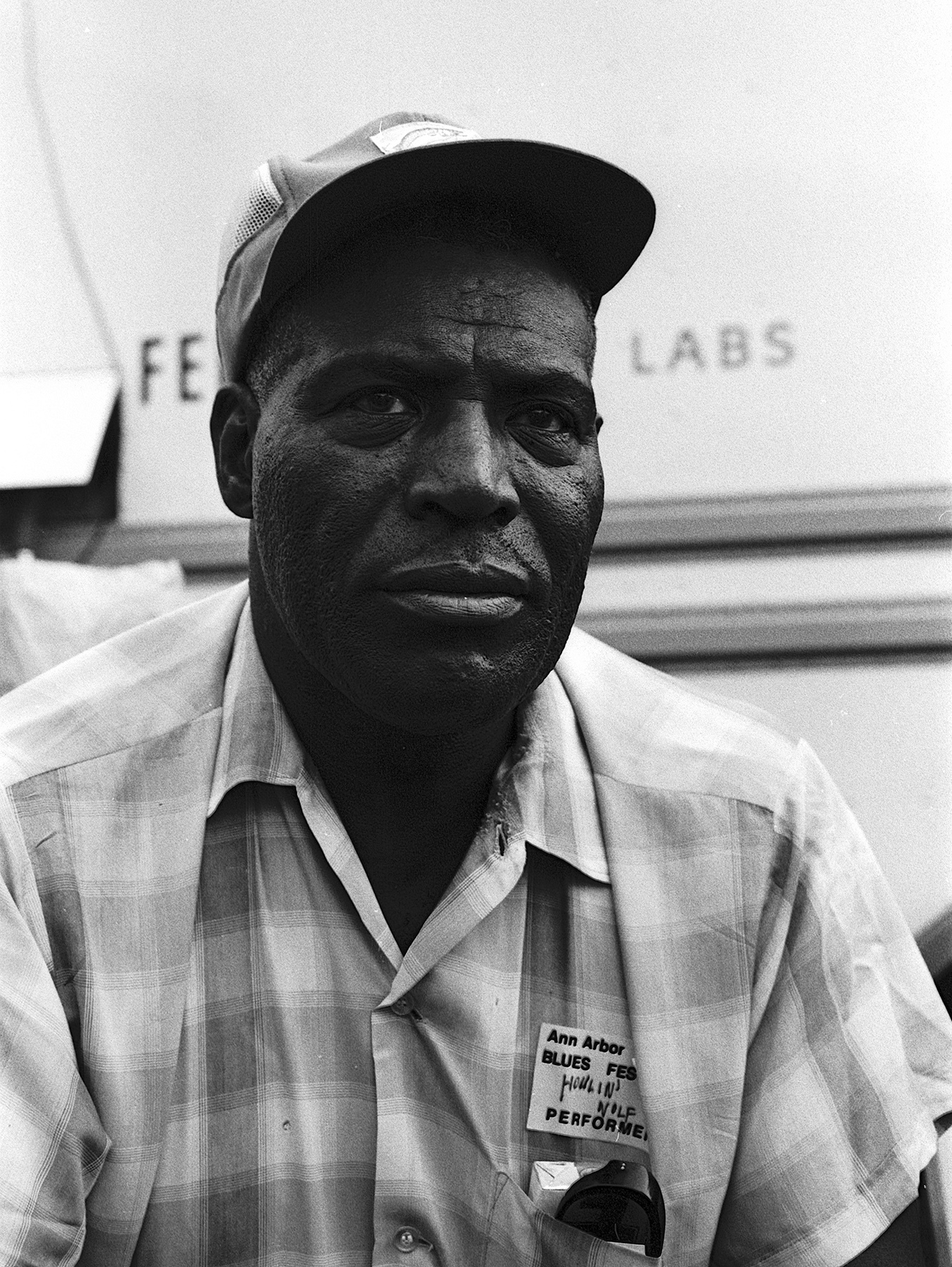
- Howlin' Wolf in 1970
- Born: Chester Arthur Burnett; June 10, 1910; White Station, Mississippi, U.S.
- Died: January 10, 1976 (aged 65); Hines, Illinois
- Resting place: Oakridge Cemetery, Hillside, Illinois
- Other names: Big Foot Chester, Bull Cow, John D.
- Occupations: Singer; musician; bandleader
- Years active: 1930s–1976
- Spouse: Lillie Handley (m. 1964)
- Children: 2
- Relatives: Skeme (great-nephew)
- Awards: Rock & Roll Hall of Fame (1991)
- Musical career
- Genres: Chicago blues; rhythm and blues; electric blues; rock and roll
- Instruments: Vocals; guitar; harmonica
- Labels: RPM; Chess

Chester Arthur Burnett (June 10, 1910 – January 10, 1976), better known by his stage name Howlin' Wolf, was an American blues singer, guitarist and harmonica player. He was at the forefront of transforming acoustic Delta blues into electric Chicago blues, and over a four-decade career, recorded blues, rhythm and blues, rock and roll, and psychedelic rock. He is regarded as one of the most influential blues musician in history.

Born into poverty in Mississippi, Burnett became a protégé of Delta blues musician Charley Patton in the 1930s. In the Deep South, he began a solo career by performing with other notable blues musicians of the day. By the end of the decade, he had established himself in the Mississippi Delta. Following a number of legal issues, a stint in prison, and Army service, he was recruited by A&R man Ike Turner to record for producer Sam Phillips in Memphis. His first record "Moanin' at Midnight" (1951) led to a record deal with Chess Records in Chicago. Between 1951 and 1969, six of his songs reached the Billboard R&B chart. His studio albums include Howlin' Wolf a.k.a. The Rocking Chair Album, a collection of singles from 1957 to 1961, The Howlin' Wolf Album (1969), Message to the Young (1971), The London Howlin' Wolf Sessions (1971), and The Back Door Wolf (1973). His reputation grew throughout the blues revival of the 1960s, and he continued to perform until November 1975, when he performed for the last time alongside fellow blues musician B.B. King. He died on January 10, 1976, after years of deteriorating health. In 1980, Howlin' Wolf was inducted into the Blues Hall of Fame, and in 1991, he was inducted into the Rock and Roll Hall of Fame.

With a booming voice and an imposing physical presence, he is one of the best-known Chicago blues artists. AllMusic has described him as "a primal, ferocious blues belter with a roster of classics rivaling anyone else, and a sandpaper growl of a voice that has been widely imitated". Several of his songs have become blues and blues rock standards. The Rock and Roll Hall of Fame listed "Little Red Rooster", "Smokestack Lightning", "Killing Floor", and "Spoonful" in its "500 Songs That Shaped Rock and Roll" and “Smokestack Lightning" was inducted into the Grammy Hall of Fame in 1999. In 2011, Rolling Stone magazine ranked him number 54 on its list of the "100 Greatest Artists of All Time".

== Early life ==
Chester Arthur Burnett was born on June 10, 1910, in White Station, near West Point, Mississippi, to Gertrude Jones and Leon "Dock" Burnett. He later said that his father was "Ethiopian", while Jones had Choctaw ancestry on her father's side. He was named for Chester A. Arthur, the 21st President of the United States. The name "Howlin' Wolf" originated from Burnett's maternal grandfather, John Jones; Burnett had been squeezing his grandmother's chicks so hard he was likely to kill them, and his grandfather told him wolves would come and get him. The blues historian Paul Oliver wrote that Burnett once claimed to have been given his nickname by his idol Jimmie Rodgers.

Burnett's parents separated when he was a year old. Dock, who had worked seasonally as a farm laborer in the Mississippi Delta, moved there permanently while Jones and Burnett moved to Monroe County. Jones and Burnett would sing together in the choir of the Life Boat Baptist Church near Gibson, Mississippi, and Burnett would later claim that he got his musical talent from her. Jones kicked Burnett out of the house, for unknown reasons, during the winter when he was a child. (Note: Segrest & Hoffman 2004, p. 6 speculate various such reasons as Burnett's refusal to work the fields, his rejection of choir music in favor of singing the blues, that the half-Indian Jones thought Burnett was "too dark", and that Jones had met another man who did not want Burnett around.) At the peak of his success, he returned from Chicago to see his mother in Mississippi and was driven to tears when she refused to take money offered by him, saying it was from his playing the "devil's music".

He moved in with his great uncle Will Young, who had a large household and treated him badly. While in the Young household he worked almost all day and did not receive an education at the school house. When he was thirteen, he killed one of Young's hogs in a rage after the hog had caused him to ruin his dress clothes; this enraged Young who then whipped him while chasing him on a mule. He then ran away and claimed to have walked 85 miles (137 km) barefoot to join his father, where he finally found a happy home with his father's large family. During this era he went by the name "John D." to dissociate himself from his past, a name by which several of his relatives would know him for the rest of his life.

His physique garnered him the nicknames "Big Foot Chester" and "Bull Cow" as a young man: he was 6 feet 3 inches (191 cm) tall and weighed 275 pounds (125 kg).

== Musical career ==
=== Beginnings, 1930s ===
On January 15, 1928, at the age of 17, Burnett gathered enough money to buy his first guitar. It was a date that Burnett reportedly never forgot until "the day he died".

In 1930, Burnett met Charley Patton, the most popular bluesman in the Mississippi Delta at the time. He would listen to Patton play nightly from outside a nearby juke joint. There he remembered Patton playing "Pony Blues", "High Water Everywhere", "A Spoonful Blues", and "Banty Rooster Blues". The two became acquainted, and soon Patton was teaching him guitar. Burnett recalled that "the first piece I ever played in my life was ... a tune about hook up my pony and saddle up my black mare"—Patton's "Pony Blues". He also learned about showmanship from Patton: "When he played his guitar, he would turn it over backwards and forwards, and throw it around over his shoulders, between his legs, throw it up in the sky". He played with Patton often in small Delta communities and would perform the guitar tricks he learned from him for the rest of his life.

Burnett was influenced by other popular blues performers of the time, including the Mississippi Sheiks, Blind Lemon Jefferson, Ma Rainey, Lonnie Johnson, Tampa Red, Blind Blake, and Tommy Johnson. Two of the earliest songs he mastered were Jefferson's "Match Box Blues" and Leroy Carr's "How Long, How Long Blues". The country singer Jimmie Rodgers was also an influence. Burnett tried to emulate Rodgers's "blue yodel" but found that his efforts sounded more like a growl or a howl: "I couldn't do no yodelin', so I turned to howlin'. And it's done me just fine". His harmonica playing was modeled after that of Sonny Boy Williamson II, who taught him how to play when Burnett moved to Parkin, Arkansas, in 1933.

During the 1930s, Burnett performed in the South as a solo performer and with numerous blues musicians, including Floyd Jones, Johnny Shines, Honeyboy Edwards, Sonny Boy Williamson II, Robert Johnson, Robert Lockwood Jr., Willie Brown, Son House and Willie Johnson. By the end of the decade, he was a fixture in clubs, with a harmonica and an early electric guitar. It was around this time that Burnett got into some legal trouble in Hughes, Arkansas: While he was in town, he tried to protect a female acquaintance from an angry boyfriend, and the two men fought, with Burnett killing the man with a hoe. What happened after this is a matter of dispute; Burnett either fled the area, or did some jail time.

=== Military service, 1940s ===
On April 9, 1941, he was inducted into the U.S. Army and was stationed at several bases around the country. Years later, he stated that the plantation workers in the Delta had alerted military authorities because he refused to work in the fields. He was assigned to the 9th Cavalry Regiment, which was famous for being one of the units dubbed "Buffalo Soldiers". Burnett was first sent to Pine Bluff, Arkansas, for basic training, and was given long hours performing menial work. Then he was transferred to Camp Blanding, in Starke, Florida, where he was assigned to the kitchen patrol. During the day he would cook food for the enlisted soldiers, and at night he would play the guitar in the assembly room. Burnett was later sent to Fort Gordon in Georgia, and he would play his guitar on the steps of the mess hall, which is where a young James Brown, who came to the Fort nearly every day to earn money shining shoes and performing buck dances for the troops, first heard him play.

Burnett was then sent to a tutoring camp in Tacoma, Washington, where he was in charge of decoding communications. Because Burnett was functionally illiterate, having never received formal education, he was repeatedly beaten by the drill instructor for reading and spelling errors. Soon, he began having uncontrollable shaking fits, dizzy spells, fainting, and also began experiencing mental confusion.

Burnett participated in the Louisiana Maneuvers in 1941, where one of the earliest photographs of him was taken cleaning the frog of a horse's hoof. In 1943, he was evaluated at an Army mental hospital. In November 1943, Burnett was found unfit for duty and given an honorable discharge on November 3. Recalling his experiences in the Army years later, Burnett stated, "The Army ain't no place for a black man. Jus' couldn't take all that bossin' around, I guess. The Wolf's his own boss."

He returned to his family, which had recently moved near West Memphis, Arkansas, and helped with the farming while also performing, as he had done in the 1930s, with Floyd Jones and others. In 1948 he formed a band, which included the guitarists Willie Johnson and Matt "Guitar" Murphy, the harmonica player Junior Parker, a pianist remembered only as "Destruction" and the drummer Willie Steele. Radio station KWEM in West Memphis began broadcasting his live performances, and he occasionally sat in with Williamson on KFFA in Helena, Arkansas.

=== First recordings and initial success, 1950s ===
In 1951, 19-year-old Ike Turner, who was a freelance talent scout, heard Howlin' Wolf in West Memphis. Turner brought him to record several songs for Sam Phillips at Memphis Recording Service (later renamed Sun Studio) and the Bihari brothers at Modern Records. Phillips praised his singing, saying, "God, what it would be worth on film to see the fervour in that man's face when he sang. His eyes would light up, you'd see the veins come out on his neck and, buddy, there was nothing on his mind but that song. He sang with his damn soul." Howlin' Wolf quickly became a local celebrity and began working with a band that included the guitarists Willie Johnson and Pat Hare. Sun Records had not yet been formed, so Phillips licensed his recording to Chess Records. Howlin' Wolf's first singles were issued by two different record companies in 1951: "Moanin' at Midnight"/"How Many More Years" was released on Chess, while "Riding in the Moonlight"/"Morning at Midnight" and "Passing By Blues"/"Crying at Daybreak" were released on Modern's subsidiary RPM Records. In December 1951, Leonard Chess was able to secure Howlin' Wolf's contract, and at the urging of Chess, he relocated to Chicago in late 1952.

In Chicago, Howlin' Wolf assembled a new band and recruited the Chicagoan Jody Williams from Memphis Slim's band as his first guitarist. Within a year he had persuaded the guitarist Hubert Sumlin to leave Memphis and join him in Chicago; Sumlin's understated solos and surprisingly subtle phrasing perfectly complemented Burnett's huge voice. The lineup of the band changed often over the years. Wolf employed many different guitarists, both on recordings and in live performance, including Willie Johnson, Jody Williams, Lee Cooper, L.D. McGhee, Otis "Big Smokey" Smothers, his brother Little Smokey Smothers, Jimmy Rogers, Freddie Robinson, Buddy Guy and others. He was able to attract some of the best musicians available because of his policy, unusual among bandleaders, of paying his musicians well and on time, even including their unemployment insurance and Social Security contributions. With the exception of a couple of brief absences in the late 1950s, Sumlin remained a member of the band for the rest of Wolf's career and is the guitarist most often associated with the Howlin' Wolf sound.

Howlin' Wolf had a series of hits with songs written by Willie Dixon, who had been hired by the Chess brothers in 1950 as a songwriter. During that period, the competition between Muddy Waters and Howlin' Wolf was intense. Dixon reported "Every once in a while Wolf would mention the fact that, 'Hey man, you wrote that song for Muddy. How come you won't write me one like that?' But when you'd write for him he wouldn't like it." So, Dixon decided to use reverse psychology on him, by introducing the songs to Wolf as written for Muddy, thus getting Wolf to accept them.

In the 1950s, Howlin' Wolf had five songs on the Billboard national R&B chart: "Moanin' at Midnight", "How Many More Years", "Who Will Be Next", "Smokestack Lightning", and "I Asked for Water (She Gave Me Gasoline)". His first LP, Moanin' in the Moonlight, was released in 1959. As was standard practice during that time, it was a collection of previously released singles.

=== Album releases and European tours, 1960s and 1970s ===
In the early 1960s, Howlin' Wolf recorded several songs that became his most famous, despite receiving no radio play: "Wang Dang Doodle", "Back Door Man", "Spoonful", "The Red Rooster", "I Ain't Superstitious", "Goin' Down Slow", and "Killing Floor", many of which were written by Willie Dixon. Several became part of the repertoires of British and American rock groups, who further popularized them. Howlin' Wolf's second compilation album, Howlin' Wolf—often called "the rocking chair album" from its cover illustration—was released in 1962.

During the blues revival in the 1950s and 1960s, black blues musicians found a new audience among white youths, and Howlin' Wolf was among the first to capitalize on it. He toured Europe in 1964 as part of the American Folk Blues Festival, produced by the German promoters Horst Lippmann and Fritz Rau. Also, in that year, the Rolling Stones recording of "Little Red Rooster" reached number one in the UK. In 1965, at the height of the British Invasion, the Stones came to America for an appearance on ABC-TV's rock music show, Shindig! They insisted, as part of their appearing on the program, that Howlin' Wolf would be their special guest. With the Stones sitting at his feet, Wolf performed an empassioned version of "How Many More Years" with a few million people watching his network TV debut.

In the late 1960s and early 1970s, Howlin' Wolf recorded albums with other established musicians starting with The Super Super Blues Band (1968), which featured Bo Diddley and Muddy Waters. The Howlin' Wolf Album (1969) had psychedelic rock and free-jazz musicians like Gene Barge, Pete Cosey, Roland Faulkner, Morris Jennings, Louis Satterfield, Charles Stepney and Phil Upchurch.The Howlin' Wolf Album, like rival bluesman Muddy Waters's album Electric Mud, was designed to appeal to the hippie audience. The album had an attention-getting cover: large black letters on a white background proclaiming "This is Howlin' Wolf's new album. He doesn't like it. He didn't like his electric guitar at first either." The album cover may have contributed to its poor sales. Chess co-founder Leonard Chess admitted that the cover was a bad idea, saying, "I guess negativity isn't a good way to sell records. Who wants to hear that a musician doesn't like his own music?"

British rock musicians Eric Clapton, Steve Winwood, Ian Stewart, Bill Wyman, and Charlie Watts backed him for The London Howlin' Wolf Sessions, which proved more successful with British audiences than American. His last albumThe Back Door Wolf (1973) was entirely composed of new material. It was recorded with musicians who regularly backed him on stage, including Hubert Sumlin, Detroit Junior, Andrew "Blueblood" McMahon, Chico Chism, Lafayette "Shorty" Gilbert and the bandleader, Eddie Shaw. The album is shorter than any other he recorded, a little more than 35 minutes, because of his declining health.

Wolf's last public performance was in November 1975 at the International Amphitheatre in Chicago. He shared the bill with B.B. King, Albert King, Luther Allison, and O. V. Wright. Wolf reportedly gave an "unforgettable" performance, even crawling across the stage during the song, "Crawling King Snake". The crowd gave him a five-minute standing ovation. When he got off the stage after the concert was over, a team of paramedics had to revive him.

== Artistry and legacy ==
=== Musical style ===
Wolf is among the most influential blues musicians of the postwar years. He was at the forefront of transforming the rural acoustic blues of the South, to the electric, more urban blues of Chicago. When Wolf first formed his band in West Memphis, Arkansas, his sound was much more aggressive, with guitarist Willie Johnson's raucous, distorted guitar playing being the signature sound of his early recordings. When Wolf switched guitarists and added Hubert Sumlin to his lineup, his sound became less aggressive with Sumlin adding "angular riffing" and "wild soloing". He also adopted the backbeat that Chicago blues was mainly known for.

The musician and critic Cub Koda noted, "no one could match Howlin' Wolf for the singular ability to rock the house down to the foundation while simultaneously scaring its patrons out of its wits." Producer Sam Phillips recalled, "When I heard Howlin' Wolf, I said, 'This is for me. This is where the soul of man never dies.'"

=== Equipment ===
Although Sumlin was the main guitar player in Wolf's band, Wolf played a number of guitars himself throughout the years. He played a 1965 Epiphone Casino on his musical tour in Europe, a Fender Coronado, a Gibson Firebird V in the "Down in the Bottom" video recorded in 1966, a white Fender Stratocaster, a Teisco Tre-100, and he also played a Kay K-161 ThinTwin in his earlier years. The Kay K-161 ThinTwin is currently residing in the Rock & Roll Hall of Fame in Cleveland, Ohio.

=== Accolades ===
In 1980, Burnett was posthumously inducted into the Blues Foundation's Blues Hall of Fame. He was also inducted into the Rock & Roll Hall of Fame as an early influence in 1991, and the Hall of Fame located in his hometown of West Point, Mississippi, in 1995.

On September 17, 1994, the U.S. Postal Service issued a 29 cent commemorative postage stamp depicting Howlin' Wolf.

On September 1, 2005, the Howlin' Wolf Blues Museum opened at 57 E. Westbrook Street in West Point, Mississippi. An annual festival is held there.

The Howlin' Wolf Foundation, a nonprofit corporation organized under the US tax code, section 501(c)(3), was established by Bettye Kelly to preserve and extend his legacy. The foundation's mission and goals include preserving blues music, providing scholarships for students to participate in music programs, and support for blues musicians and blues programs.

The experimental rock band Swans performs a song titled "Just A Little Boy (for Chester Burnett)" on their 2014 album To Be Kind. The song takes heavy blues inspiration and features lead singer Michael Gira vocalizing in a manner similar to Burnett's howling style.

In 2023, Rolling Stone ranked Howlin' Wolf at number 59 on its list of the 200 Greatest Singers of All Time.

== Personal life ==
Burnett was noted for his disciplined approach to his personal finances. Having already achieved a measure of success in Memphis, he described himself as "the onliest one to drive himself up from the Delta" to Chicago, which he did, in his own car on the Blues Highway and with $4,000 in his pocket, a rare distinction for a black bluesman of the time. Although functionally illiterate into his forties, Burnett eventually returned to school, first to earn a General Educational Development (GED) diploma and later to study accounting and other business courses to help manage his career.

Burnett met his future wife, Lillie Handley (1925–2001), when she attended one of his performances at a Chicago club. She and her family were urban and educated and were not involved in what was considered the unsavory world of blues musicians. Nevertheless, he was attracted to her as soon as he saw her in the audience. He immediately pursued her and won her over. According to those who knew them, the couple remained deeply in love until his death. Together, they raised two daughters Betty and Barbara, Lillie's daughters from an earlier relationship. West Coast rapper Skeme is his great nephew, who was born 14 years after his death.

After he married Lillie, who was able to manage his professional finances, he was so financially successful that he was able to offer band members not only a decent salary but benefits such as health insurance. This enabled him to hire his pick of available musicians and keep his band one of the best around. According to his stepdaughters, he was never financially extravagant (for instance, he drove a Pontiac station wagon rather than a more expensive, flashy car).

=== Health ===
Burnett's health began declining in the late 1960s. He suffered his first heart attack in 1969 as he and Hubert Sumlin were traveling to a show at University of Chicago. He fell against the dashboard of the car he was riding in, and Sumlin, who was driving, pulled over and grabbed a two-by-four piece of wood that was lying in the road. Sumlin then rammed the wood into Burnett's back, which kick-started his heart. Three weeks later, while he was in Toronto for a gig, Burnett suffered additional heart and kidney problems, but refused an operation recommended by doctors, telling his wife that "he needed to keep working".

In 1970, Burnett was involved in a serious car accident that sent him flying through the windshield, which caused extensive damage to his kidneys. For the rest of his life, he received dialysis treatments every three days, which wife Lillie administered. In May that same year, while he was in the United Kingdom to record The London Howlin' Wolf Sessions, his health problems worsened. A year later, Burnett suffered another heart attack, and his kidneys had failed. He also began suffering from high blood pressure. By May 1973, Burnett was back performing again. The bandleader, Eddie Shaw, was so concerned for Burnett's health that he limited him to performing six songs per concert.

== Death ==
In January 1976, Burnett checked into the Edward Hines Jr. Veterans Administration Hospital in Hines, Illinois, for kidney surgery. Three days before his death, a carcinoma was found in his brain. He died from a combination of the tumor, heart failure, and kidney disease on January 10, 1976, at the age of 65. He was buried in Oakridge Cemetery, outside Chicago, in a plot in Section 18, on the east side of the road. His gravestone has an image of a guitar and harmonica etched into it.

== Awards and nominations ==
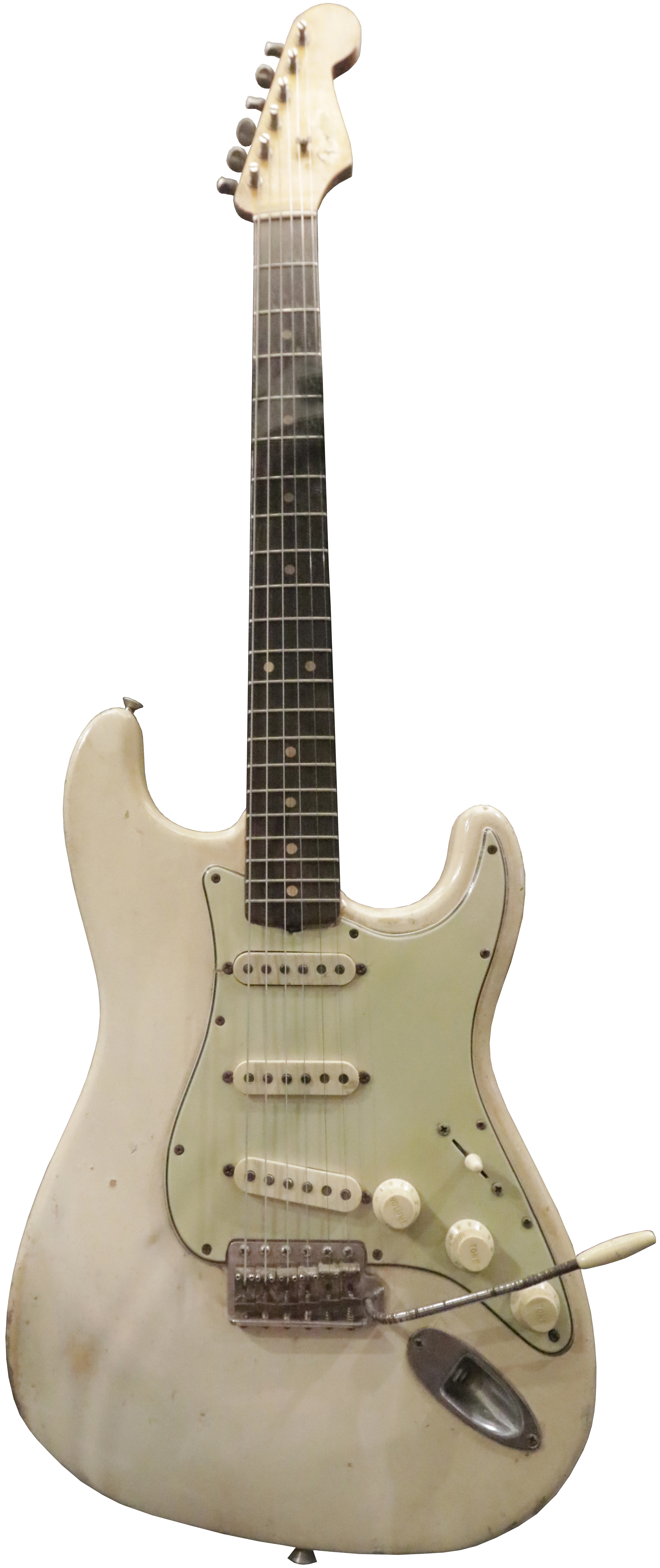
Howlin' Wolf's 1963 Fender Stratocaster (Rock and Roll Hall of Fame, Cleveland, Ohio)

In 1972, Howlin' Wolf was awarded an honorary doctor of arts degree from Columbia College in Chicago.

=== Grammy Hall of Fame ===
In 1999, Wolf's recording of "Smokestack Lightning" was selected for a Grammy Hall of Fame Award, an award established in 1973 to honor recordings that are at least 25 years old and have "qualitative or historical significance".

Howlin' Wolf Grammy Award history
Year	Title	Genre	Label	Year inducted
1956	"Smokestack Lightning"	Blues (Single)	Chess	1999

=== Rock and Roll Hall of Fame ===
The Rock and Roll Hall of Fame listed three songs by Howlin' Wolf in its "500 Songs That Shaped Rock and Roll".

Year recorded	Title
1956	"Smokestack Lightning"
1960	"Spoonful"
1961	"The Red Rooster"

=== The Blues Foundation Awards ===
Howlin' Wolf: Blues Music Awards
Year	Category	Title	Result
2004	Historical Blues Album of the Year	The London Howlin' Wolf Sessions	Nominated
1995	Reissue Album of the Year	Ain't Gonna Be Your Dog	Nominated
1992	Vintage or Reissue Blues Album—US or Foreign	The Chess Box—Howlin' Wolf	Winner
1990	Vintage/Reissue (Foreign)	Memphis Days	Nominated
1989	Vintage/Reissue Album (US)	Cadillac Daddy	Nominated
1988	Vintage/Reissue Album (Foreign)	Killing Floor: Masterworks Vol. 5	Winner
1987	Vintage/Reissue Album (US)	Moanin' in the Moonlight	Winner
1981	Vintage or Reissue Album (Foreign)	More Real Folk Blues	Nominated

=== Inductions ===
Howlin' Wolf inductions
Year	Institution	Category	Notes
2020	Blues Hall of Fame	Classic of Blues Recording: Album	The Chess Box—Howlin' Wolf
2012	Memphis Music Hall of Fame	Musicians	Inaugural class
2003	Mississippi Musicians Hall of Fame	Blues	
1991	Rock and Roll Hall of Fame	Early influences	
1980	Blues Hall of Fame	Musicians	

== Discography ==
=== Albums ===
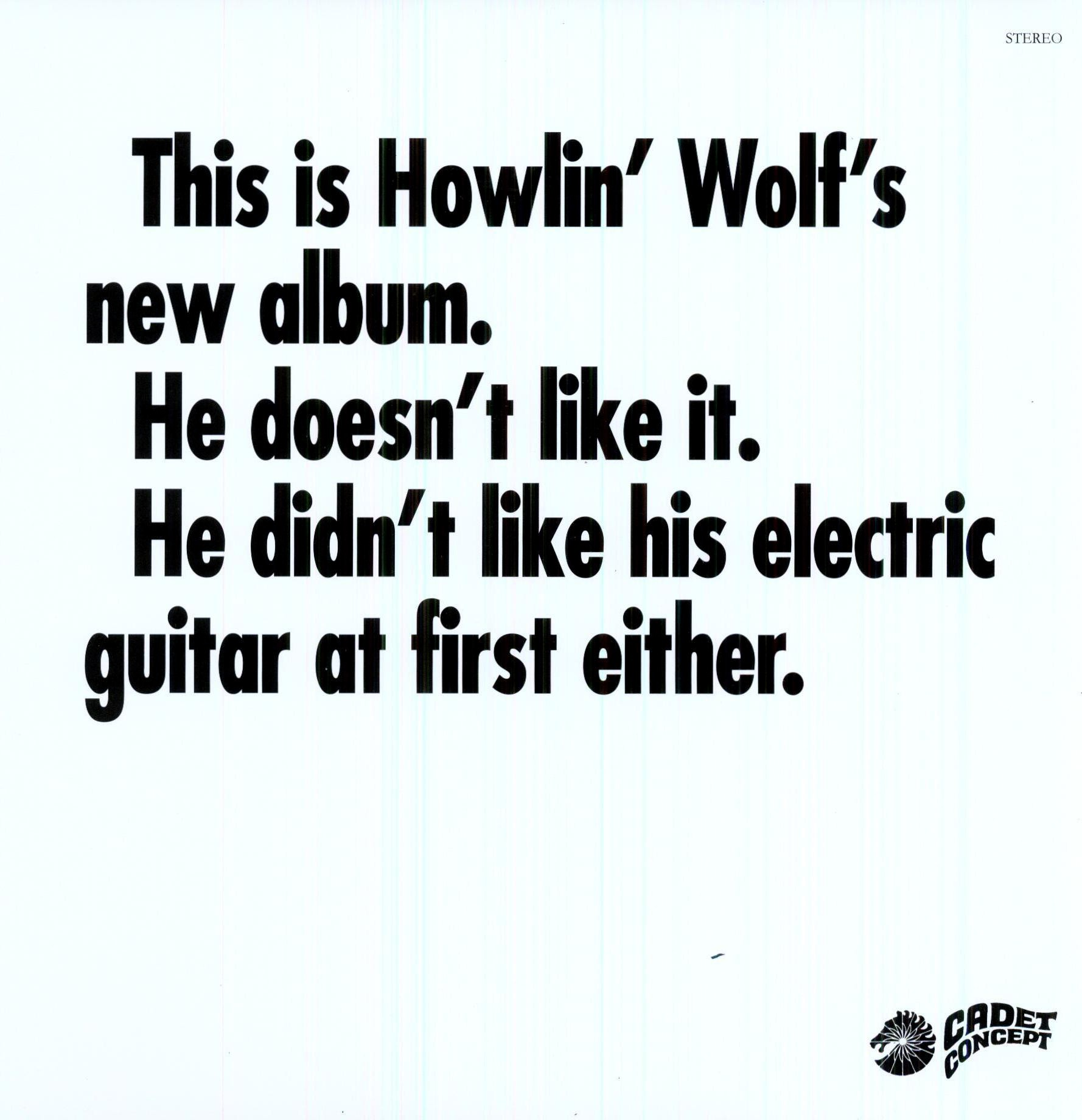
The cover of The Howlin' Wolf Album (1969), disliked by Howlin' Wolf

- 1959: Moanin' in the Moonlight (Chess) 1951–1958 recordings
- 1962: Howlin' Wolf (Chess) 1957–1962 recordings
- 1962: Howling Wolf Sings the Blues (Crown) 1951–1952 RPM recordings
- 1965: The Real Folk Blues (Chess) 1956–1965 recordings
- 1967: More Real Folk Blues (Chess) 1953–1956 recordings
- 1968: The Super Super Blues Band (Chess) with Muddy Waters and Bo Diddley
- 1969: The Howlin' Wolf Album (Cadet Concept)
- 1971: Message to the Young (Chess)
- 1971: The London Howlin' Wolf Sessions (Chess)
- 1972: Chester Burnett A.K.A. Howlin' Wolf (Chess) 1951–1965 recordings
- 1972: Live and Cookin' (Chess)
- 1973: The Back Door Wolf (Chess)
- 1974: London Revisited (Chess) split album with Muddy Waters
- 1975: Change My Way (Chess) 1958–1966 recordings
- 1977: The Legendary Sun Performers: Howlin' Wolf (Charly)
- 1979: Heart Like Railroad Steel (Memphis & Chicago Blues 1951–57) (Blues Ball)
- 1979: Can't Put Me Out (Chicago 1956–72, Volume II) (Blues Ball)
- 1984: Muddy & the Wolf (Chess) split album with Muddy Waters
- 1984: His Greatest Sides, Volume One (Chess)
- 1991: The Chess Box—Howlin' Wolf (Chess/MCA)
- 1991: Howlin' Wolf Rides Again (Flair/Virgin)
- 1994: Ain't Gonna Be Your Dog (Chess Collectibles, Vol. 2) (Chess/MCA)
- 1997: His Best (Chess/MCA); reissued as The Definitive Collection (Geffen, 2007)
- 1999: His Best, Vol. 2 (Chess/MCA)
- 2011: Smokestack Lightning (The Complete Chess Masters 1951–1960) (Hip-O Select/Geffen)

=== Singles ===
Year	Titles (A-side, B-side) Both sides from same album except where indicated	Label & Cat No.	US R&B	Album
1951	"How Many More Years"	Chess 1479	4	Moanin' in the Moonlight
1951	/ "Moanin' at Midnight"	Chess 1479	10	Moanin' in the Moonlight
1951	"Riding in the Moonlight" b/w "Morning at Midnight"	RPM 333	—	Howling Wolf Sings the Blues
1951	"Passing By Blues" b/w "Crying at Daybreak" (from Howling Wolf Sings the Blues) [note: "Crying at Daybreak" is an early version of "Smokestack Lightning".]	RPM 340	—	Non-album tracks
1952	"The Wolf Is at Your Door" b/w "Howlin' Wolf Boogie"	Chess 1497	—	Non-album tracks
1952	"My Baby Stole Off" b/w "I Want Your Picture"	RPM 347	—	Non-album tracks
1952	"Gettin' Old and Grey" b/w "Mr. Highway Man"	Chess 1510	—	Non-album tracks
1952	"Saddle My Pony" b/w "Worried All the Time"	Chess 1515	—	Non-album tracks
1952	"Oh, Red!" b/w "My Last Affair"	Chess 1528	—	Non-album tracks
1953	"All Night Boogie" b/w "I Love My Baby" (from More Real Folk Blues)	Chess 1557	—	Moanin' in the Moonlight
1954	"No Place to Go" b/w "Rockin' Daddy" (from More Real Folk Blues)	Chess 1566	—	Moanin' in the Moonlight
1954	"Baby How Long" b/w "Evil Is Goin' On"	Chess 1575	—	Moanin' in the Moonlight
1954	"I'll Be Around" b/w "Forty Four" (from Moanin' in the Moonlight)	Chess 1584	—	More Real Folk Blues
1955	"Who Will Be Next" b/w "I Have a Little Girl"	Chess 1593	14	More Real Folk Blues
1955	"Come to Me Baby" b/w "Don't Mess with My Baby"	Chess 1607	—	Non-album tracks
1956	"Smokestack Lightning" b/w "You Can't Be Beat" (from More Real Folk Blues)	Chess 1618	8	Moanin' in the Moonlight
1956	"I Asked for Water" b/w "So Glad" (non-album track)	Chess 1632	8	Moanin' in the Moonlight
1957	"Going Back Home" b/w "My Life"	Chess 1648	—	Non-album tracks
1957	"Somebody in My Home" b/w "Nature" (from The Real Folk Blues)	Chess 1668	—	Moanin' in the Moonlight
1958	"Sitting on Top of the World" b/w "Poor Boy"	Chess 1679	—	The Real Folk Blues
1958	"I Didn't Know" b/w "Moanin' for My Baby" (from Moanin' in the Moonlight)	Chess 1695	—	Change My Way
1958	"I'm Leaving You" b/w "Change My Way" (from Change My Way)	Chess 1712	—	Moanin' in the Moonlight
1959	"I Better Go Now" b/w "Howlin' Blues"	Chess 1726	—	Change My Way
1959	"I've Been Abused" b/w "Mr. Airplane Man"	Chess 1735	—	Change My Way
1959	"The Natchez Burning" b/w "You Gonna Wreck My Life" (from More Real Folk Blues)	Chess 1744	—	The Real Folk Blues
1960	"Tell Me" b/w "Who's Been Talking"	Chess 1750	—	Howlin' Wolf
1960	"Spoonful" b/w "Howlin' for My Darling"	Chess 1762	—	Howlin' Wolf
1961	"Wang-Dang Doodle" b/w "Back Door Man"	Chess 1777	—	Howlin' Wolf
1961	"Down in the Bottom" b/w "Little Baby"	Chess 1793	—	Howlin' Wolf
1961	"The Red Rooster" b/w "Shake for Me"	Chess 1804	—	Howlin' Wolf
1962	"You'll Be Mine" b/w "Goin' Down Slow"	Chess 1813	—	Howlin' Wolf
1962	"I Ain't Superstitious" b/w "Just Like I Treat You"	Chess 1823	—	Change My Way
1962	"Mama's Baby" b/w "Do the Do" (from Change My Way)	Chess 1844	—	Non-album track
1963	"Three Hundred Pounds of Joy" b/w "Built for Comfort"	Chess 1870	—	The Real Folk Blues
1964	"Hidden Charms" b/w "Tail Dragger" (from The Real Folk Blues)	Chess 1890	—	Change My Way
1964	"My Country Sugar Mama" b/w "Love Me Darling" (from Change My Way)	Chess 1911	—	The Real Folk Blues
1965	"Louise" b/w "Killing Floor"	Chess 1923	—	The Real Folk Blues
1965	"Tell Me What I've Done" b/w "Ooh Baby"	Chess 1928	—	The Real Folk Blues
1965	"Don't Laugh at Me" b/w "I Walked from Dallas"	Chess 1945	—	Change My Way
1966	"New Crawling King Snake" b/w "My Mind Is Ramblin'"	Chess 1968	—	Change My Way
1967	"Pop It to Me" b/w "I Had a Dream"	Chess 2009	—	Non-album tracks
1969	"Evil (Is Goin' On)" [remake] b/w "Tail Dragger" [remake]	Cadet Concept 7013	43	The Howlin' Wolf Album
1970	"Mary Sue" b/w "Hard Luck"	Chess 2081	—	Non-album tracks
1971	"I Smell a Rat" b/w "Just As Long"	Chess 2108	—	Message to the Young
1971	"Do the Do" [remake] b/w "The Red Rooster" [remake]	Chess 2118	—	The London Howlin' Wolf Sessions
1973	"Coon on the Moon" b/w "The Back Door Wolf"	Chess 2145	—	The Back Door Wolf

== Sessionography ==
Title	Date	Studio	Location	Comments
Baby Ride with Me	Early 1951	Memphis Recording Service	Memphis, TN	Audition session
Ridin' in the Moonlight	Early 1951	Memphis Recording Service	Memphis, TN	Audition session
Baby Ride with Me (Ridin' in the Moonlight)	1951-14-05	Memphis Recording Service	Memphis, TN	
How Many More Years	1951-14-05	Memphis Recording Service	Memphis, TN	
How Many More Years	1951-00-07	Memphis Recording Service	Memphis, TN	Chess 1479
Moanin' at Midnight	1951-00-07	Memphis Recording Service	Memphis, TN	Chess 1479
Baby Ride with Me (Ridin' in the Moonlight)	1951-00-09	KWEM	West Memphis, AR	RPM 333
Dog Me Around	1951-00-09	KWEM	West Memphis, AR	
Morning at Midnight	1951-00-09	KWEM	West Memphis, AR	RPM 333
Keep What You Got	1951-00-09	KWEM	West Memphis, AR	
Passing By Blues	1951-10-02	Private home	West Memphis, AR	RPM 340
Crying at Daybreak	1951-10-02	Private home	West Memphis, AR	RPM 340
My Baby Stole Off	1951-10-02	Private home	West Memphis, AR	RPM 347
I Want Your Picture	1951-10-02	Private home	West Memphis, AR	RPM 347
Howlin' Wolf Boogie	1951-12-18	Memphis Recording Service	Memphis, TN	Chess 1497
California Blues #1	1951-12-18	Memphis Recording Service	Memphis, TN	
California Boogie	1951-12-18	Memphis Recording Service	Memphis, TN	
Look-a-Here Baby	1951-12-18	Memphis Recording Service	Memphis, TN	
The Wolf Is at Your Door (Howlin' for My Baby)	1951-12-18	Memphis Recording Service	Memphis, TN	Chess 1497
Smile at Me	1951-12-18	Memphis Recording Service	Memphis, TN	
Worried All the Time	1951-12-18	Memphis Recording Service	Memphis, TN	Chess 1515
Mr. Highway Man (Cadillac Daddy)	1952-01-23	Memphis Recording Service	Memphis, TN	Chess 1510
My Troubles and Me	1952-01-23	Memphis Recording Service	Memphis, TN	
Getting Old and Grey	1952-01-23	Memphis Recording Service	Memphis, TN	Chess 1510
My Baby Walked Off	1952-01-23	Memphis Recording Service	Memphis, TN	
Chocolate Drop	1952-01-23	Memphis Recording Service	Memphis, TN	
House Rockin' Boogie	1952-02-12	Private home	West Memphis, AR	
Brown Skin Woman	1952-02-12	Private home	West Memphis, AR	
Worried About My Baby	1952-02-12	Private home	West Memphis, AR	
Driving This Highway	1952-02-12	Private home	West Memphis, AR	
The Sun Is Rising	1952-02-12	Private home	West Memphis, AR	
My Friends	1952-02-12	Private home	West Memphis, AR	
I'm the Wolf	1952-02-12	Private home	West Memphis, AR	
Passing the Blues	1952-02-12	Private home	West Memphis, AR	
Everybody's in the Mood (All in the Mood)	1952-04-17	Memphis Recording Service	Memphis, TN	
Color and Kind	1952-04-17	Memphis Recording Service	Memphis, TN	
Bluebird	1952-04-17	Memphis Recording Service	Memphis, TN	
Saddle My Pony	1952-04-17	Memphis Recording Service	Memphis, TN	Chess 1515
Dorothy Mae	1952-04-17	Memphis Recording Service	Memphis, TN	
Sweet Woman (I've Got a Woman)	1952-04-17	Memphis Recording Service	Memphis, TN	
(Well) That's All Right	1952-04-17	Memphis Recording Service	Memphis, TN	
Decoration Day	1952-04-17	Memphis Recording Service	Memphis, TN	
Oh Red	1952-10-07	Memphis Recording Service	Memphis, TN	Chess 1528
My Last Affair	1952-10-07	Memphis Recording Service	Memphis, TN	Chess 1528
Come Back Home	1952-10-07	Memphis Recording Service	Memphis, TN	
Drinkin' C.V. Wine Blues	1952-10-07	Memphis Recording Service	Memphis, TN	
I've Got a Woman	1953	Memphis Recording Service	Memphis, TN	Mastered on 1953-09-24
Just My Kind	1953	Memphis Recording Service	Memphis, TN	Mastered on 1953-09-24
Work for Your Money	1953	Memphis Recording Service	Memphis, TN	Mastered on 1953-09-24
I'm Not Joking	1953	Memphis Recording Service	Memphis, TN	Mastered on 1953-09-24
Mama Died and Left Me	1953	Memphis Recording Service	Memphis, TN	Mastered on 1953-09-24
Highway My Friend	1953	Memphis Recording Service	Memphis, TN	Mastered on 1953-10-28
Hold Your Money	1953	Memphis Recording Service	Memphis, TN	Mastered on 1953-10-28
Streamline Woman	1953	Memphis Recording Service	Memphis, TN	Mastered on 1953-10-28
California Blues #2	1953	Memphis Recording Service	Memphis, TN	Mastered on 1953-10-28
Stay Here Till My Baby Comes Back	1953	Memphis Recording Service	Memphis, TN	Mastered on 1953-10-28
Crazy About You Baby	1953	Memphis Recording Service	Memphis, TN	Mastered on 1953-10-28
All Night Boogie	1953	Memphis Recording Service	Memphis, TN	Mastered on 1953-10-28; Chess 1557
I Love My Baby	1953	Memphis Recording Service	Memphis, TN	Mastered on 1953-10-28; Chess 1557
No Place to Go	1954-03	Chess Studios	Chicago, IL	Chess 1566
You Gonna Wreck My Life	1954-03	Chess Studios	Chicago, IL	Chess 1744
Neighbors	1954-03	Chess Studios	Chicago, IL	
I'm the Wolf	1954-03	Chess Studios	Chicago, IL	
Rockin' Daddy	1954-03	Chess Studios	Chicago, IL	Chess 1566
Baby How Long	1954-05-25	Chess Studios	Chicago, IL	Chess 1575
Evil	1954-05-25	Chess Studios	Chicago, IL	Chess 1575
I'll Be Around	1954-10	Chess Studios	Chicago, IL	Chess 1584
Forty Four	1954-10	Chess Studios	Chicago, IL	Chess 1584
Who Will Be Next	1955-03	Chess Studios	Chicago, IL	Chess 1593
I Have a Little Girl	1955-03	Chess Studios	Chicago, IL	Chess 1593
Come to Me Baby	1955-03	Chess Studios	Chicago, IL	Chess 1607
Don't Mess with My Baby	1955-03	Chess Studios	Chicago, IL	Chess 1607
Smokestack Lightning	1956-01	Chess Studios	Chicago, IL	Chess 1618
You Can't Be Beat	1956-01	Chess Studios	Chicago, IL	Chess 1618
I Asked for Water	1956-07-19	Chess Studios	Chicago, IL	Chess 1632
So Glad	1956-07-19	Chess Studios	Chicago, IL	Chess 1632
Break of Day	1956-07-19	Chess Studios	Chicago, IL	
The Natchez Burnin'	1956-07-19	Chess Studios	Chicago, IL	Chess 1744
Going Back Home	1956-12	Chess Studios	Chicago, IL	Chess 1648
Bluebird	1956-12	Chess Studios	Chicago, IL	
My Life	1956-12	Chess Studios	Chicago, IL	Chess 1648
You Ought to Know	1956-12	Chess Studios	Chicago, IL	
Who's Been Talking?	1957-06-24	Chess Studios	Chicago, IL	Chess 1750
Tell Me	1957-06-24	Chess Studios	Chicago, IL	Chess 1750
Somebody in My Home	1957-06-24	Chess Studios	Chicago, IL	Chess 1668
Nature	1957-06-24	Chess Studios	Chicago, IL	Chess 1668
Walk to Camp Hall	1957-12	Chess Studios	Chicago, IL	
Poor Boy	1957-12	Chess Studios	Chicago, IL	Chess 1679
My Baby Told Me	1957-12	Chess Studios	Chicago, IL	
Sittin' on Top of the World	1957-12	Chess Studios	Chicago, IL	Chess 1679
I Didn't Know	1958-03	Chess Studios	Chicago, IL	
Howlin' Blues (I'm Going Away)	1958-03	Chess Studios	Chicago, IL	Chess 1726
I Better Go Now	1958-03	Chess Studios	Chicago, IL	Chess 1726
I Didn't Know (rerecorded)	1958-04-03	Chess Studios	Chicago, IL	Chess 1695
Moaning for My Baby	1958-04-03	Chess Studios	Chicago, IL	Chess 1695
Midnight Blues	1958-04-03	Chess Studios	Chicago, IL	
I'm Leavin' You	1958-09	Chess Studios	Chicago, IL	Chess 1712
You Can't Put Me Out	1958-09	Chess Studios	Chicago, IL	
Change My Way	1958-09	Chess Studios	Chicago, IL	Chess 1712
Getting Late	1958-09	Chess Studios	Chicago, IL	
I've Been Abused	1959-07	Chess Studios	Chicago, IL	Chess 1735
Howlin' for My Darling	1959-07	Chess Studios	Chicago, IL	Chess 1762
My People's Gone	1959-07	Chess Studios	Chicago, IL	
Mr. Airplane Man	1959-07	Chess Studios	Chicago, IL	Chess 1735
Wolf in the Mood	1959-07	Chess Studios	Chicago, IL	
Wang Dang Doodle	1960-06	Chess Studios	Chicago, IL	Chess 1777
Back Door Man	1960-06	Chess Studios	Chicago, IL	Chess 1777
Spoonful	1960-06	Chess Studios	Chicago, IL	Chess 1762
Down in the Bottom	1961-05	Chess Studios	Chicago, IL	Chess 1793
Little Baby	1961-05	Chess Studios	Chicago, IL	Chess 1793
Shake for Me	1961-06	Chess Studios	Chicago, IL	Chess 1804
The Red Rooster	1961-06	Chess Studios	Chicago, IL	Chess 1804
You'll Be Mine	1961-12	Chess Studios	Chicago, IL	Chess 1813
Just Like I Treat You	1961-12	Chess Studios	Chicago, IL	Chess 1823
I Ain't Superstitious	1961-12	Chess Studios	Chicago, IL	Chess 1823
Goin' Down Slow	1961-12	Chess Studios	Chicago, IL	Chess 1813
Mama's Baby	1962-09-27,28	Chess Studios	Chicago, IL	Chess 1844
Do the Do	1962-09-27,28	Chess Studios	Chicago, IL	Chess 1844
Tail Dragger	1962-09-27,28	Chess Studios	Chicago, IL	Chess 1890
Long Green Stuff	1962-09-27,28	Chess Studios	Chicago, IL	
Hidden Charms	1963-08-14	Chess Studios	Chicago, IL	Chess 1890
Three Hundred Pounds of Joy	1963-08-14	Chess Studios	Chicago, IL	Chess 1870
Joy to My Soul	1963-08-14	Chess Studios	Chicago, IL	
Built for Comfort	1963-08-14	Chess Studios	Chicago, IL	Chess 1870
Love Me Darlin'	1964-08	Chess Studios	Chicago, IL	Chess 1911
Killing Floor	1964-08	Chess Studios	Chicago, IL	Chess 1923
My Country Sugar Mama	1964-08	Chess Studios	Chicago, IL	Chess 1911
Louise	1964-08	Chess Studios	Chicago, IL	Chess 1923
I Walked from Dallas	1965-04-15	Chess Studios	Chicago, IL	Chess 1945
Tell Me What I've Done	1965-04-15	Chess Studios	Chicago, IL	Chess 1928
Don't Laugh at Me	1965-04-15	Chess Studios	Chicago, IL	Chess 1945
Ooh Baby	1965-04-15	Chess Studios	Chicago, IL	Chess 1928
Poor Wind That Never Change	1966-04-11	Chess Studios	Chicago, IL	
New Crawlin' King Snake	1966-04-11	Chess Studios	Chicago, IL	Chess 1968
My Mind Is Ramblin'	1966-04-11	Chess Studios	Chicago, IL	Chess 1968
Commit a Crime	1966-04-11	Chess Studios	Chicago, IL	
Pop It to Me	1967-06	Chess Studios	Chicago, IL	Chess 2009
I Had a Dream	1967-06	Chess Studios	Chicago, IL	Chess 2009
Dust My Broom	1967-06	Chess Studios	Chicago, IL	
Long Distance Call	1967-09	Chess Studios	Chicago, IL	
Ooh Baby/Wrecking My Love Life	1967-09	Chess Studios	Chicago, IL	
Sweet Little Angel	1967-09	Chess Studios	Chicago, IL	
Spoonful	1967-09	Chess Studios	Chicago, IL	
Diddley Daddy	1967-09	Chess Studios	Chicago, IL	
The Red Rooster	1967-09	Chess Studios	Chicago, IL	
Goin' Down Slow	1967-09	Chess Studios	Chicago, IL	
Spoonful	1968-11	Chess Studios	Chicago, IL	
Tail Dragger	1968-11	Chess Studios	Chicago, IL	
Smokestack Lightnin'	1968-11	Chess Studios	Chicago, IL	
Moanin' at Midnight	1968-11	Chess Studios	Chicago, IL	
Built for Comfort	1968-11	Chess Studios	Chicago, IL	
The Red Rooster	1968-11	Chess Studios	Chicago, IL	
Evil	1968-11	Chess Studios	Chicago, IL	
Down in the Bottom	1968-11	Chess Studios	Chicago, IL	
Three Hundred Pounds of Joy	1968-11	Chess Studios	Chicago, IL	
Back Door Man	1968-11	Chess Studios	Chicago, IL	
I'm the Wolf	1968-11	Chess Studios	Chicago, IL	
Rollin' and Tumblin'	1968-11	Chess Studios	Chicago, IL	
Howlin Wolf interview	1968-11	Chess Studios	Chicago, IL	
I Ain't Gonna Be Your Dog No More	1968-11	Chess Studios	Chicago, IL	
Woke Up This Morning	1968-11	Chess Studios	Chicago, IL	
Ain't Going Down That Dirt Road	1968-11	Chess Studios	Chicago, IL	
Mary Sue	1969-07-14	Chess Studios	Chicago, IL	Chess 2081
Hard Luck	1969-07-14	Chess Studios	Chicago, IL	Chess 2081
The Big House	1969-07-14	Chess Studios	Chicago, IL	
Tired of Crying	1969-07-14	Chess Studios	Chicago, IL	
I Want to Have a Word with You	1970-05-02 through 07	Olympic Studios	London	
Goin' Down Slow	1970-05-02 through 07	Olympic Studios	London	
I Ain't Superstitious	1970-05-02 through 07	Olympic Studios	London	
Rockin' Daddy	1970-05-02 through 07	Olympic Studios	London	
Poor Boy	1970-05-02 through 07	Olympic Studios	London	
Wang Dang Doodle	1970-05-02 through 07	Olympic Studios	London	
Sittin' on Top of the World	1970-05-02 through 07	Olympic Studios	London	
Do the Do	1970-05-02 through 07	Olympic Studios	London	
Highway 49	1970-05-02 through 07	Olympic Studios	London	
Commit a Crime	1970-05-02 through 07	Olympic Studios	London	
Worried About My Baby	1970-05-02 through 07	Olympic Studios	London	
Built for Comfort	1970-05-02 through 07	Olympic Studios	London	
Who's Been Talking?	1970-05-02 through 07	Olympic Studios	London	
The Red Rooster	1970-05-02 through 07	Olympic Studios	London	
Killing Floor	1970-05-02 through 07	Olympic Studios	London	
If I Were a Bird	1971-10	Chess Studios	Chicago, IL	
Message	1971-10	Chess Studios	Chicago, IL	
I Smell a Rat	1971-10	Chess Studios	Chicago, IL	
Miss James	1971-10	Chess Studios	Chicago, IL	
Message to the Young	1971-10	Chess Studios	Chicago, IL	
She's Looking Good	1971-10	Chess Studios	Chicago, IL	
Just As Long	1971-10	Chess Studios	Chicago, IL	
Romance Without Finance	1971-10	Chess Studios	Chicago, IL	
Turn Me On	1971-10	Chess Studios	Chicago, IL	
Moving	1973-08-14,17	Chess Studios	Chicago, IL	
Coon on the Moon	1973-08-14,17	Chess Studios	Chicago, IL	
Speak Now Woman	1973-08-14,17	Chess Studios	Chicago, IL	
Trying to Forget You	1973-08-14,17	Chess Studios	Chicago, IL	
Stop Using Me	1973-08-14,17	Chess Studios	Chicago, IL	
Leave Here Walking	1973-08-14,17	Chess Studios	Chicago, IL	
The Back Door Wolf	1973-08-14,17	Chess Studios	Chicago, IL	
You Turn Slick on Me	1973-08-14,17	Chess Studios	Chicago, IL	
Watergate Blues	1973-08-14,17	Chess Studios	Chicago, IL	
Can't Stay Here	1973-08-14,17	Chess Studios	Chicago, IL	

== General references ==
- Collis, John (1998). The Story of Chess Records. Bloomsbury USA. ISBN 978-1-58234-005-0.
- Humphrey, Mark (2007). The Definitive Collection (liner notes). Howlin' Wolf. Geffen Records/Chess Records. B0008784-02/CHD-9375 BK02.
- McGlynn, Don (2003). The Howlin' Wolf Story – The Secret History of Rock & Roll (DVD). Bluebird/Arista. 82876-56631-9.
- Oliver, Paul (1969). The Story of the Blues. Barrie & Jenkins. ISBN 3-85445-092-3.
- Sawyers, June Skinner (2012). Chicago Portraits: New Edition. Northwestern University Press. ISBN 978-0-8101-2649-7.
- Segrest, James; Hoffman, Mark (2004). Moanin' at Midnight: The Life and Times of Howlin' Wolf. Pantheon Books. ISBN 0-375-42246-3.
- Whitburn, Joel (1988). Top R&B Singles 1942–1988. Record Research. ISBN 0-89820-068-7.
