= Killing Floor (song) =

1964 single by Howlin' Wolf

Single by Howlin' Wolf
- B-side: "Louise"
- Released: c. April 1965
- Recorded: Chicago, August 1964
- Genre: Blues
- Length: 2:48
- Label: Chess
- Songwriter: Chester Burnett a.k.a. Howlin' Wolf
- Producers: Leonard Chess, Phil Chess, Willie Dixon

Howlin' Wolf singles chronology
"My Country Sugar Mama" (1964)	"Killing Floor" (1965)	"Tell Me What I Have Done" (1965)

"Killing Floor" is a 1964 song by American blues singer-songwriter and guitarist Howlin' Wolf. Called "one of the defining classics of Chicago electric blues", "Killing Floor" became a blues standard with recordings by various artists. It has been acknowledged by the Blues Foundation Hall of Fame, which noted its popularity among rock as well as blues musicians. English rock group Led Zeppelin adapted the song for their "The Lemon Song", for which Howlin' Wolf is named as a co-author.

== Original song ==
Howlin' Wolf recorded "Killing Floor" in Chicago in August 1964, which Chess Records released as a single. According to blues guitarist and longtime Wolf associate Hubert Sumlin, the song uses the killing floor – the area of a slaughterhouse where animals are killed – as a metaphor or allegory for male-female relationships: "Down on the killing floor – that means a woman has you down, she went out of her way to try to kill you. She at the peak of doing it, and you got away now ... You know people have wished they was dead – you been treated so bad that sometimes you just say, 'Oh Lord have mercy.' You’d rather be six feet in the ground."

"Killing Floor" is an upbeat twelve-bar blues with an "instantly familiar" guitar riff provided by Sumlin. Backing Howlin' Wolf (vocals) and Sumlin (electric guitar) are Lafayette Leake (piano), Buddy Guy (acoustic guitar), Andrew "Blueblood" McMahon (bass), Sam Lay (drums), Arnold Rogers (tenor sax), and Donald Hankins (baritone sax). The song appears on several Howlin' Wolf compilation albums, including his 1966 album The Real Folk Blues.

== Jimi Hendrix rendition ==
Jimi Hendrix performed "Killing Floor" early in his career, including early vocal performances with Curtis Knight and the Squires in 1965 and 1966. Shortly after arriving in England in September 1966, Hendrix performed the song when he sat in with Cream at Regent Street Polytechnic. "Killing Floor" was included in the set list of the newly formed Jimi Hendrix Experience. The song was often a set opener, and Hendrix played the song at a faster tempo, with a different rhythm guitar and bass line. Early recordings include live versions from October 1966 in Paris (The Jimi Hendrix Experience box set), March 1967 in the BBC studios (BBC Sessions), and June 1967 at the Monterey International Pop Festival (Jimi Plays Monterey).

== The Electric Flag version ==
This song was performed by The Electric Flag on their 1968 album, A Long Time Comin. The lead guitarist was Mike Bloomfield, and the vocalist was Nick Gravenites. The track, which was preceded by a snippet of the beginning of a speech by Lyndon B. Johnson, was introduced to a wider audience after its inclusion on the very successful CBS sampler, The Rock Machine Turns You On.

== Led Zeppelin version ==
"The Lemon Song"

Song by Led Zeppelin

from the album Led Zeppelin II
- Released: October 22, 1969
- Recorded: May 4–5, 1969; August 5, 1969
- Studio: Mystic, Hollywood, California; A&M, Hollywood, California
- Genre: Hard rock; blues rock
- Length: 6:20
- Label: Atlantic
- Songwriters: John Bonham; Chester Burnett; John Paul Jones; Jimmy Page; Robert Plant
- Producer: Jimmy Page

Led Zeppelin performed "Killing Floor" live in 1968 and 1969, and it became the basis for "The Lemon Song", which they recorded on their 1969 album Led Zeppelin II. It was recorded in Los Angeles when the band were on their second concert tour of North America. In some early performances Robert Plant introduced the song as "Killing Floor"; an early UK pressing of Led Zeppelin II showed the title as "Killing Floor" and was credited to Chester Burnett (Howlin' Wolf's real name). For the second and third North American tours the song evolved into "The Lemon Song", with Plant often improvising lyrics onstage (the opening lyrics to both songs are identical).

Other lyrics, notably "squeeze (my lemon) till the juice runs down my leg," can be traced to Robert Johnson's "Travelling Riverside Blues". It is likely that Johnson borrowed this himself, from a song recorded earlier in the same year (1937) called "She Squeezed My Lemon" (by Art McKay). The song also references Albert King's "Cross-Cut Saw" In December 1972, Arc Music, owner of the publishing rights to Howlin' Wolf's songs, sued Led Zeppelin for copyright infringement on "The Lemon Song". The parties settled out of court. Though the amount was not disclosed, Howlin' Wolf received a check for US$45,123 from Arc Music immediately following the suit, and subsequent releases included a co-songwriter credit for him.

"The Lemon Song" was performed live on Led Zeppelin's first three concert tours of the United States (on the first tour as "Killing Floor"), before being dropped from their live set in late 1969. However, the 'squeeze my lemon' sequence continued to be inserted into the "Whole Lotta Love" medley and ad-libbed elsewhere. Jimmy Page performed this song on his tour with the Black Crowes in 1999. A version of "The Lemon Song" performed by Page and the Black Crowes can be found on the album Live at the Greek.

Appraising Led Zeppelin's recording in 2002, Chuck Klosterman of Spin said the song "pulls Moby's break-beats-and-field-recordings trick 30 years early (no Pro Tools, so John Bonham just belts Robert Plant in the 'nads till the juice runs down his leg)."

=== Personnel ===
According to Jean-Michel Guesdon and Philippe Margotin:

- Robert Plant – vocals
- Jimmy Page – guitars
- John Paul Jones – bass
- John Bonham – drums, gong

== Slash version ==
"Killing Floor"

Song by Slash

from the album Orgy of the Damned
- Released: March 8, 2024
- Recorded: 2023
- Studio: East West / Snakepit (Los Angeles)
- Genre: Blues
- Length: 4:18
- Label: Gibson
- Songwriters: Slash; Chester Burnett a.k.a. Howlin' Wolf; Brian Johnson; Steven Tyler
- Producer: Mike Clink

Slash performed a cover of the song with Brian Johnson of AC/DC on vocals and Steven Tyler of Aerosmith on harmonica on his 2024 album Orgy of the Damned.

== Recognition and legacy ==
"Killing Floor" is recognized as a blues standard, with Skip James' 1931 recording "Hard Time Killing Floor Blues" as the likely inspiration. In 1991, the song was inducted into the Blues Foundation Hall of Fame in the "Classics of Blues Recordings" category. The panel identified it as "one of Wolf’s most recognizable songs. It has long been a staple among many blues bands and ranks as one of Wolf’s most often-covered songs, by both blues and rock acts."

== See also ==
- 1964 in music
- Blues rock
- Led Zeppelin discography

== Bibliography ==
- Guesdon, Jean-Michel; Margotin, Philippe (2018). Led Zeppelin All the Songs: The Story Behind Every Track. Running Press. ISBN 978-0-316-448-67-3.
