= List of Mountain band members =

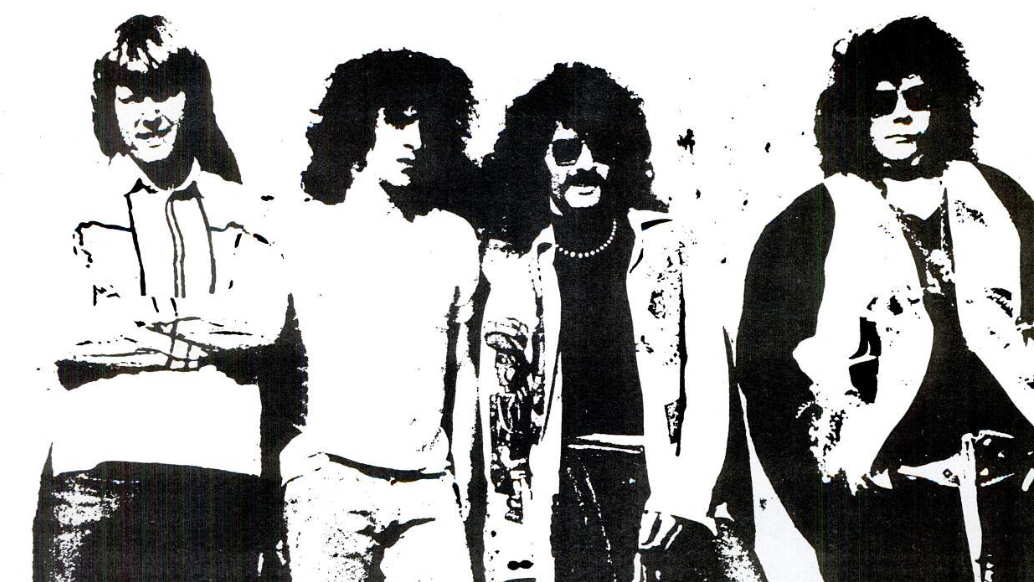
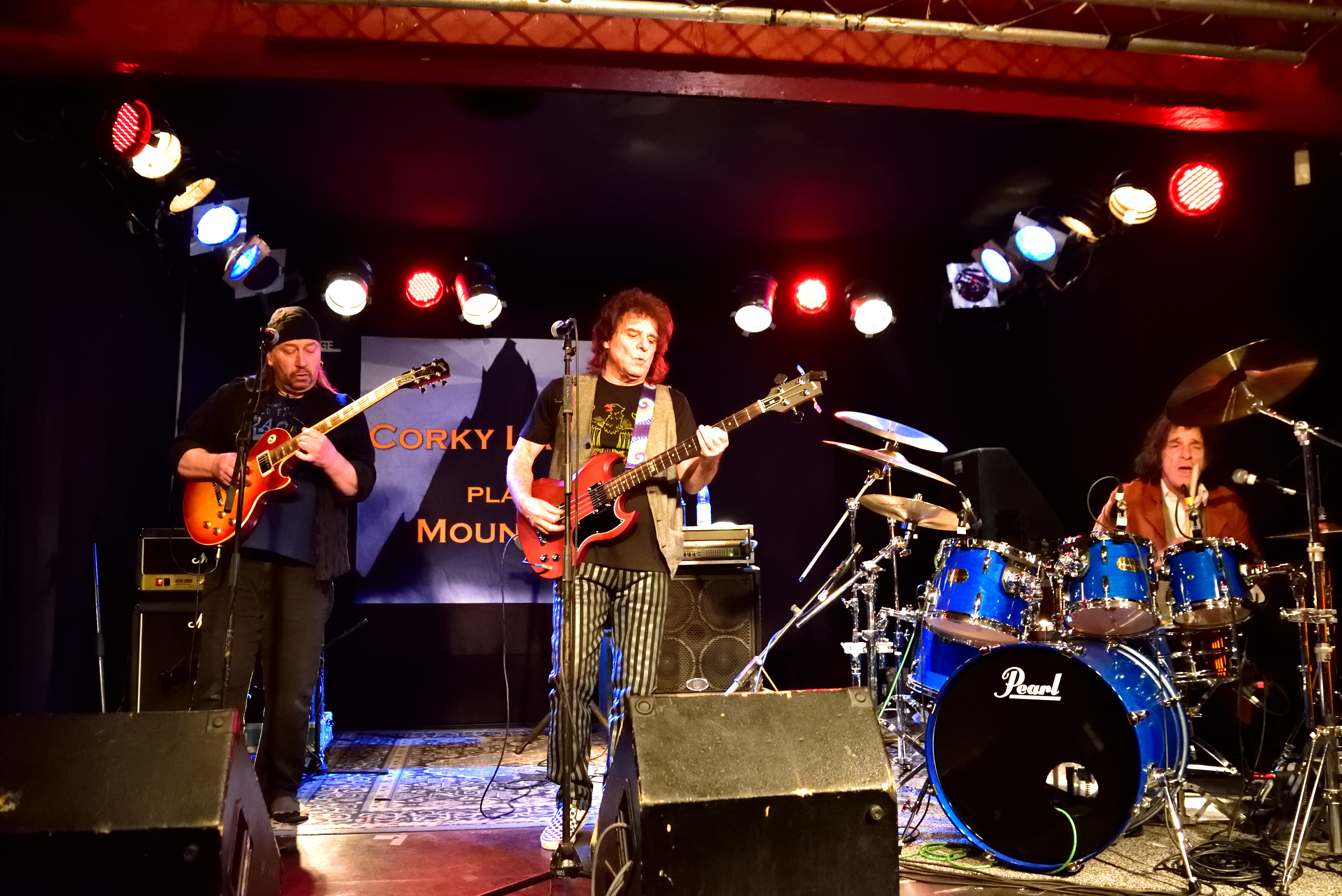
Two line-ups of Mountain in 1970 and 2016.

Mountain was an American hard rock band from Long Island, New York. Formed in July 1969, the group originally consisted of guitarist and lead vocalist Leslie West, bassist and second vocalist Felix Pappalardi, drummer Norman "N. D." Smart and keyboardist Steve Knight. Pappalardi and Smart had performed on West's debut album Mountain earlier in the year (which was also produced by the bassist), and subsequently added Knight to complete the initial lineup of the band of the same name. Later in the year, Smart departed and was replaced by Canadian drummer Laurence "Corky" Laing. The group released three commercially successful albums – Climbing! in 1970, and Nantucket Sleighride and Flowers of Evil in 1971 – before breaking up in early 1972 due to increasing tensions between band members.

By mid-1973, West and Pappalardi had reformed Mountain with new members Allan Schwartzberg (drums) and Bob Mann (rhythm guitar, keyboards), who together released the live album Twin Peaks from their only concert tour. Laing later returned to the group and Mann was replaced by David Perry, with the new lineup's first studio effort Avalanche released the following July. Mountain broke up for a second time after another tour, with its final show taking place on December 31, 1974. West subsequently embarked on a solo career, before reforming Mountain for a third time in 1981 with Laing on drums and Miller Anderson on bass. On April 17, 1983, founding member Pappalardi was killed by his wife and musical collaborator Gail Collins Pappalardi, in what was deemed to be an accidental shooting.

Mountain released Go for Your Life in 1985, which featured new bassist Mark Clarke. Shortly after its release and promotion, the group quietly disbanded again. West and Laing returned as Mountain in 1992, with new bassist Richie Scarlet. After changing personnel again by replacing Scarlet with Randy Coven and later Noel Redding, the group released its sixth studio album Man's World in 1996 with a returning Clarke on bass. After another breakup in 1998, Mountain returned in 2001 to record Mystic Fire, which featured session bassist Chuck Hearne alongside West and Laing. For the subsequent touring cycle, Scarlet returned to the band. James "Rev" Jones took over in 2008, until 2010 when the band quietly dispanded.

Corky Laing formed a new project, Corky Laing Plays Mountain, in 2015. This project included bassist/vocalist Joe Venti and guitarist/vocalist Phil Baker in 2015. For their 2016 United States tour, Laing and Venti were joined by Richie Scarlet, now on lead guitar, and Ken Sidotti on keyboards. They performed Mountain music in addition to songs by West, Bruce and Laing and Cream. And in 2017, Mark Mikel was playing bass with Chris Shutters and Richie Scarlet on guitar in the lineup. Mikel continued until touring was ceased in 2020 due to COVID-19.

West died of cardiac arrest on December 23, 2020.

In 2021 Corky Laing's Mountain resumed touring with a lineup of Laing (drums, vocals), Joe Venti (bass, vocals) and Richie Scarlet (guitar, keyboards).

== Members ==
=== Mountain ===
Image	Name	Years active	Instruments	Release contributions
	Leslie West	1969–1972; 1973–1974; 1981–1985; 1992–1998; 2001–2010 (died 2020)	guitar; lead vocals	all Mountain releases
	Felix Pappalardi	1969–1972; 1973–1974 (died 1983)	bass; keyboards; lead vocals	all Mountain releases from Climbing! (1970) to Avalanche (1974)
	Steve Knight	1969–1972 (died 2013)	keyboards	all Mountain releases from Climbing! (1970) to Live: The Road Goes Ever On (1972)
	Norman "N. D." Smart	1969	drums	Live: The Road Goes Ever On (1972)
	Corky Laing	1969–1972; 1973–1974; 1981–1985; 1992–1998; 2001–2010	drums; percussion; vocals	all Mountain releases, except Twin Peaks (1974)
	Bob Mann	1973	rhythm guitar; keyboards	Twin Peaks (1974)
	Allan Schwartzberg	1973	drums	Twin Peaks (1974)
	David Perry	1973–1974 (died 2008)	rhythm guitar; backing vocals	Avalanche (1974)
	Miller Anderson	1981–1984	bass; vocals; guitar (studio only)	Go for Your Life (1985) – one track only
	Mark Clarke	1984–1985; 1995–1998	bass; vocals	Go for Your Life (1985); Man's World (1996); Eruption (2004)
	Richie Scarlet	1992–1993; 2001–2008	bass; vocals	Mystic Fire (2002) – one track only; Eruption (2004); Live in Texas 2005 (2006); Masters of War (2007)
	Randy Coven	1993–1994 (died 2014)	bass; vocals	none
	Noel Redding	1994–1995 (died 2003)	bass; vocals	Over the Top (1995) – two tracks only
	James "Rev" Jones	2008–2010	bass; vocals	none

=== Corky Laing's Mountain ===
Image	Name	Years active	Instruments
	Corky Laing	2015–present	drums; percussion; vocals
	Joe Venti	2015–2016; 2021–2022; 2023	bass; vocals
	Phil Baker	2015–2016; 2019; 2019–2021; 2023–present	guitar; vocals
	Richie Scarlet	2016–2018; 2019; 2019; 2021–2023	guitar; keyboards
	Ken Sidotti	2016; 2022	keyboards
	Mark Mikel	2017–2021	vocals; bass; keyboards
	Chris Shutters	2017–2019	guitar; vocals
	Mark Clarke	2022 (guest)	bass; vocals
	Brent Ek	2022; 2023–present	bass; vocals

== Lineups ==
=== Mountain ===
Period	Members	Studio and live albums
Mid – late 1969	Leslie West – guitar, vocals; Felix Pappalardi – bass, keyboards, vocals; N. D. Smart – drums; Steve Knight – keyboards	Live: The Road Goes Ever On (1972)
Late 1969 – early 1972	Leslie West – guitar, vocals; Felix Pappalardi – bass, keyboards, vocals; Corky Laing – drums, percussion; Steve Knight – keyboards	Climbing! (1970); Nantucket Sleighride (1971); Flowers of Evil (1971); Live: The Road Goes Ever On (1972)
Band inactive early 1972 – mid 1973
Mid – late 1973	Leslie West – guitar, vocals; Felix Pappalardi – bass, vocals; Bob Mann – guitar, keyboards; Allan Schwartzberg – drums	Twin Peaks (1974)
Late 1973 – late 1974	Leslie West – guitar, vocals; Felix Pappalardi – bass, keyboards, vocals; David Perry – guitar, backing vocals; Corky Laing – drums, percussion	Avalanche (1974)
Band inactive late 1974 – 1981
1981–1984	Leslie West – guitar, vocals; Miller Anderson – bass, vocals; Corky Laing – drums, percussion	none
1984–1985	Leslie West – guitar, vocals; Mark Clarke – bass, vocals; Corky Laing – drums, percussion	Go for Your Life (1985); Eruption (2004)
Band inactive late 1985 – 1992
1992–1993	Leslie West – guitar, vocals; Richie Scarlet – bass, vocals; Corky Laing – drums, percussion, vocals	none
1993–1994	Leslie West – guitar, vocals; Randy Coven – bass, vocals; Corky Laing – drums, percussion, vocals	none
1994–1995	Leslie West – guitar, vocals; Noel Redding – bass, vocals; Corky Laing – drums, percussion, vocals	Over the Top new tracks (1995)
1995–1998	Leslie West – guitar, vocals; Mark Clarke – bass, vocals; Corky Laing – drums, percussion, vocals	Man's World (1996)
Band inactive late 1998 – 2001
2001–2002	Leslie West – guitar, vocals; Corky Laing – drums, percussion, vocals	Mystic Fire (2002)
April 2002 – August 2008	Leslie West – guitar, vocals; Richie Scarlet – bass, vocals; Corky Laing – drums, percussion, vocals	Eruption (2004); Live in Texas 2005 (2006); Masters of War (2007)
August 2008 – December 2010	Leslie West – guitar, vocals; Rev Jones – bass, vocals; Corky Laing – drums, percussion, vocals	none

=== Corky Laing's Mountain ===
Period	Members	Studio and live albums
November 2015 – May 2016	Phil Baker – guitar, vocals; Joe Venti – bass, vocals; Corky Laing – drums, vocals	
June – December 2016	Richie Scarlet – guitar; Joe Venti – bass, vocals; Corky Laing – drums, vocals; Ken Sidotti – keyboards	
January 2017 – July 2017	Richie Scarlet – guitar; Chris Shutters – guitar, vocals; Mark Mikel – bass, vocals, keyboards; Corky Laing – drums, vocals	
December 2017 – November 2018	Chris Shutters – guitar, vocals; Mark Mikel – bass, vocals, keyboards; Corky Laing – drums, vocals	
May – June 2019	Rickie Scarlet – guitar; Mark Mikel – bass, vocals, keyboards; Corky Laing – drums, vocals	
June 2019	Phil Baker – guitar; Mark Mikel – bass, vocals, keyboards; Corky Laing – drums, vocals	
August – October 2019	Richie Scarlet – guitar; Mark Mikel – bass, vocals, keyboards; Corky Laing – drums, vocals	
October – November 2019	Phil Baker – guitar; Mark Mikel – bass, vocals, keyboards; Corky Laing – drums, vocals	
August 2021	Richie Scarlet – guitar; Mark Mikel – bass, vocals, keyboards; Corky Laing – drums, vocals	
October 2021 – October 2022	Richie Scarlet – guitar; Joe Venti – bass, vocals; Corky Laing – drums, vocals	
October 2022	Richie Scarlet – guitar; Mark Clarke – bass, vocals; Corky Laing – drums, vocals; Ken Sidotti – keyboards	
October – November 2022	Richie Scarlet – guitar; Brent Ek – bass, vocals; Corky Laing – drums, vocals	
January – February 2023	Richie Scarlet – guitar; Joe Venti – bass, vocals; Corky Laing – drums, vocals	
September 2023	Phil Baker – guitar; Brent Ek – bass, vocals; Corky Laing – drums, vocals	
