= Moanin' in the Moonlight =

Compilation album by Howlin' Wolf
- Released: 1959
- Recorded: May 14 or August 1951 – March 1959
- Studios: Memphis Recording Service (Memphis), Chess (Chicago)
- Genres: Chicago blues, electric blues
- Length: 33:53
- Label: Chess
- Producers: Leonard Chess, Phil Chess, Willie Dixon, Sam Phillips

Howlin' Wolf chronology
Moanin' in the Moonlight (1959)	Howlin' Wolf (1962)

Singles from Moanin' in the Moonlight
- 1. "All Night Boogie" Released: December 1953; 2. "No Place to Go" Released: May 1954; 3. "Baby How Long / Evil" Released: July 26, 1954; 4. "Smokestack Lightning" Released: March 1956; 5. "I Asked for Water" Released: August 1956; 6. "Somebody in My Home" Released: August 1957; 7. "I'm Leaving You" Released: November 1958

Professional ratings
Review scores
Source	Rating
AllMusic	(Original release) (Howlin' Wolf/Moanin' In The Moonlight) Link

Moanin' in the Moonlight is a compilation album and the first album by American blues artist Howlin' Wolf, released by Chess Records in 1959. It contains songs recorded between 1951 and 1959 previously issued as singles, including one of his best-known, "Smokestack Lightning". Rolling Stone ranked it number 477 on its 2020 list of "the 500 Greatest Albums of All Time".

== Recording and production ==
The two earliest songs on the album were "Moanin' at Midnight" and "How Many More Years". These two songs and 'All Night Boogie', were recorded in Memphis, the first two at Sam Phillips' Memphis Recording Service in Memphis, Tennessee in July 1951, and, 'All Night Boogie', the last track on side one, in Memphis in 1953. These songs were sold to the Chess brothers, Leonard and Phil, who released them on two singles (Chess 1479 and Chess 1557), the first two titles being released on August 15, 1951. The rest of the songs on the album were recorded in Chicago, Illinois and were produced by the Chess brothers and/or Willie Dixon.

== Artwork, packaging, and promotion ==
The original version of Moanin' in the Moonlight featured cover artwork by Don S. Bronstein and sleeve notes by Billboard editor Paul Ackerman. Label pressings from the original series have different colors because several pressing plants were used.

The album was featured on an advertisement in Billboard magazine on August 10, 1959, which misprinted the album's title as Howlin' at Midnite.

== Accolades ==
In 1987, Moanin' in the Moonlight was given a W.C. Handy Award in the "Vintage/Reissue Album (US)" category. Rolling Stone magazine ranked the album number 477 on its 2020 list of the 500 Greatest Albums of All Time. Robert Palmer has cited "How Many More Years" (recorded May 1951) as the first record to feature a distorted power chord, played by Willie Johnson on the electric guitar.

== Track listing ==
All songs written by Chester Burnett, except where noted. (Although the original 1959 LP, and the UK Chess 1965 issue credited all compositions to 'C. Burnett' [Howlin' Wolf].)

Side one

1. "Moanin' at Midnight" – 2:58
2. "How Many More Years" – 2:42
3. "Smokestack Lightning" – 3:07
4. "Baby How Long" – 2:56
5. "No Place to Go" – 2:59
6. "All Night Boogie" – 2:12

Side two

1. "Evil (Is Going On)" – 2:55 (Willie Dixon)
2. "I'm Leavin' You" – 3:01
3. "Moanin' for My Baby" – 2:47
4. "I Asked for Water (She Gave Me Gasoline)" – 2:53
5. "Forty-Four" – 2:51 (Roosevelt Sykes, credited to Burnett)
6. "Somebody in My Home" – 2:27
- Recorded in Memphis 1951 (tracks 1 & 2), 1953 (track 6) and 1954 (tracks 4, 5, 7 & 11)
- Recorded in Chicago 1956 (tracks 3 & 10), 1957 (track 12), 1958 (track 9) and 1959 (track 8)

== Personnel ==
The following people contributed to Moanin' in the Moonlight:

- Howlin' Wolf – vocals, harmonica
- Willie Johnson – guitar on 'Moanin at Midnight," "How Many More Years," "All Night Boogie," "Smokestack Lightnin," and "Somebody's in My Home"
- Willie Steele – drums on "Moaning at Midnight" and "How Many More Years,"
- Ike Turner – piano on "Moanin' at Midnight" and "How Many More Years"
- Hubert Sumlin – guitar on "Smokestack Lightnin'," "Baby How Long," "No Place to Go," " Evil," "I'm Leaving You," "Moaning for My Baby," and "Forty Four"
- Hosea Lee Kennard – piano on "Smokestack Lightnin'," "I Asked for Water," "Somebody's in My Home," and "I'm Leavin' You"
- Willie Dixon – double bass, producer on "Smokestack Lightnin'," "Baby How Long," "Evil," "No Place to Go," "Forty Four," and "I Asked Her for Water"
- Earl Phillips – drums on "Baby How Long," "Evil," "Forty Four," "Smokestack Lightnin'," "I Asked For Water," "Somebody's in My Home," and "Moaning for My Baby"
- Jody Williams – guitar on "Baby How Long," "Evil," and "Forty Four"
- Otis Spann – piano on "No Place to Go," "Baby How Long," "Evil," and "Forty Four"
- Lee Cooper – guitar on "No Place to Go"
- Fred Below – drums on "All Night Boogie"
- S. P. Leary – drums on "I'm Leaving You"
- L. D. McGhee – guitar on "I'm Leaving You"
- Alfred Elkins – bass on "Somebody's in My Home," "Moaning for My Baby," and "I'm Leaving You"
- Adolph "Billy" Dockins – tenor saxophone on "Moanin' for My Baby" and "Somebody in My Home"
- Otis "Smokey" Smothers – guitar on "I Asked for Water (She Gave Me Gasoline)" and "Somebody in My Home"
- Sam Phillips – producer on "Moanin' at Midnight" and "How Many More Years"
- Leonard Chess – producer
- Phil Chess – producer
