= Ben Elliott =

American record producer (c. 1952–2020)

- Born: 1952; Morristown, New Jersey
- Died: April 5, 2020 (aged 67)
- Occupations: Record producer, audio engineer

Ben Elliott (c. 1952 – April 5, 2020) was an American record producer, audio engineer and co-owner of Showplace Studios in Dover, New Jersey, United States. He had been the chief engineer at Showplace since its opening in 1991. Over the years he worked with and assisted top producer/engineers such as Rob Fraboni, Jason Corsaro, Andy Wallace, and Eddie Kramer.

His own record label, American Showplace Music, has released material by Bruce Katz, Akiko Tsuruga, Bob DeVos, Alexis P. Suter, Vanessa Collier, John Ginty, Sean Chambers, The Andy T Band, and Todd Wolfe.

== Early life ==
Elliott was born in Morristown, New Jersey.

== Recording career ==
Elliott recorded, mixed and produced artists for over 30 years. He was known for his expertise in diverse musical genres, having recorded musicians such as Eric Clapton and Keith Richards (for whom he recorded and mixed "You Win Again," featured on Timeless, the Grammy Award-winning all-star tribute to Hank Williams). Elliott also recorded and/or mixed albums for Leslie West and Mountain, Peter Green, Mick Taylor, Savoy Brown, Jack Bruce, Rory Gallagher among others.

=== Blues ===
In the blues genre, he has made records with Hubert Sumlin, James Cotton, Willie "Big Eyes" Smith, Jay Hooks, Paul Oscher, Sean Chambers, and Bob Margolin.

=== Jazz ===
Elliott also worked with jazz artists including Grady Tate, Sonny Fortune and Louis Hayes, and mixed a series of Live at the Blue Note albums. He worked with R&B musicians Ben E. King, Houston Person, Jerry Jermont, Bill Easley, Bernard Purdie and Wilbur Bascomb, among others, and contemporary bands such as Clutch, Robert Randolph, and the Henry Rollins Band.

== Death ==
Elliott died on April 5, 2020, at the age of 67, from complications after a year-long battle with cancer.

== Selected credits ==
- Savoy Brown feat. Hubert Sumlin – Bring It Home (1994)
- Various Artists – Knights of the Blues Table (1997) feat. Jack Bruce, Mick Taylor w/ Max Middleton, Peter Green, Mick Jagger, The Pretty Things, Georgie Fame, Maggie Bell w/ Big Jim Sullivan
- Leslie West – As Phat as It Gets (1999)
- Savoy Brown w/ Duke Robillard – Blues Keep Me Holding On (1999)
- Miri Ben-Ari – Sahara (1999)
- Jay Hooks – Jay Hooks (2000)
- Clutch – Pure Rock Fury (2001)
- Keith Richards – Timeless: Hank Williams Tribute (2001)
- Savoy Brown – Strange Dreams (2003)
- Various Artists – Rattlesnake Guitar: Music of Peter Green (2003) feat. Rory Gallagher, Dave Peverett, Harvey Mandel, Ian Anderson, Southside Johnny, Snowy White, Dick Heckstall-Smith
- Leslie West w/ Ansley Dunbar, Tim Bogart – Blues to Die For (2003)
- Hubert Sumlin – About Them Shoes feat. Eric Clapton, Keith Richards, James Cotton, Levon Helm (2004)
- Leslie West – Got Blooze (2005)
- Leslie West – Blue Me (2006)
- Mountain w/Leslie West feat. Warren Haynes – Masters of War (2006)
- Ben E. King – Ben E. King's White Christmas with Family & Friends (2008)
- Brother Earth - ' 'The Mixed Signals' ' (2009) feat. Gerry Arias
- Sean Chambers – Trouble & Whiskey (2017) and Welcome to My Blues (2018)

== Other sources ==
- Birnbaum, C (2000, November). "The Music Man", New Jersey Monthly
