= More Real Folk Blues (Howlin' Wolf album) =

Compilation album by Howlin' Wolf
- Released: January 1967
- Recorded: Memphis, Tennessee, & Chicago; 1953 – January 1956
- Genre: Blues
- Length: 34:25
- Label: Chess
- Compiler: Marshall Chess

Howlin' Wolf chronology
The Real Folk Blues (1965)	More Real Folk Blues (1967)	The Super Super Blues Band (1968)

More Real Folk Blues is a compilation album by blues musician Howlin' Wolf, released by Chess Records in 1967. It includes songs that were recorded in Memphis and Chicago between 1953 and 1956.

== Reception ==
Professional ratings
Review scores
Source	Rating
AllMusic	4.5/5 stars

In a review for AllMusic, critic Cub Koda wrote: "This companion volume to the Real Folk Blues album was issued in 1967 and couldn't be more dissimilar in content to the first one if you had planned it that way. Whereas the previous volume highlighted middle-period Wolf, this one goes back to his earliest Chess sessions, many of which sound like leftover Memphis side".

== Track listing ==
All compositions are credited to Chester Burnett, also known as Howlin' Wolf.

1. "Just My Kind" – 2:50
2. "I've Got a Woman" – 2:53
3. "Work for Your Money" – 2:10
4. "I'll Be Around" – 3:11
5. "You Can't Be Beat" – 3:06
6. "You Gonna Wreck My Life" – 2:34
7. "I Love My Baby" – 2:55
8. "Neighbors" – 2:43
9. "I'm the Wolf" – 2:47
10. "Rocking Daddy" – 3:00
11. "Who Will Be Next?" – 2:30
12. "I Have a Little Girl" – 2:35
- Recorded in Memphis in 1953 (tracks 1–3 & 7) and in Chicago in March 1954 (tracks 6 & 8–10), October 1954 (track 4), March 1955 (tracks 11 & 12) and January 1956 (track 5)

== Personnel ==
- Howlin' Wolf – vocals, harmonica
- Henry Gray (tracks 11 & 12), Hosea Lee Kennard (track 5–7), Otis Spann (tracks 4 & 8–10) – piano
- Lee Cooper (tracks 6 & 8–10), Willie Johnson (tracks 1–3, 5 & 7), Hubert Sumlin (tracks 4, 5, 11 & 12), Jody Williams (track 4, 11 & 12) – guitar
- Willie Dixon – bass (tracks 4–6 & 8–12)
- Earl Phillips – drums (tracks 4–6 & 8–12)
- Other unidentified musicians
