= Lee Cooper (guitarist) =

American blues guitarist

Echford Cooper Jr. (November 6, 1924 – October 15, 1964), known as Lee Cooper, was an American blues guitarist. Because of his relatively short career and the anonymous role of session musicians in the 1950s, Cooper is said to be "overlooked and highly underrated." Cooper was an early master of the preferred bold style of Chicago blues guitar, so much so that he became the first successor to Howlin' Wolf's original lead guitarist.

== Life and career ==
Born in Lexington, Mississippi, he started performing on the electric guitar in Chicago in the 1940s. In 1945, he was performing with the Chicago jazz group the Hi-Di-Ho Boys after replacing the group's founding guitarist Lefty Bates. According to musician Eddie Boyd, with whom he later performed, Cooper was a chemistry graduate who lost an eye when acid splashed into it. By the early 1950s, Cooper regularly performed with Kansas City Red, and on sessions at Chess Records on recordings by Big Bill Broonzy, Washboard Sam, and others. Writer Cub Koda said that his aggressive licks anticipated those of Chuck Berry by several years.

In the mid-1950s, he succeeded Willie Johnson as the regular guitarist in Howlin' Wolf's band, and appeared on many of Wolf's most successful recordings, before being in turn replaced by Hubert Sumlin. He also played on sessions by Jimmy Witherspoon, Big Walter Horton and others, and in Eddie Boyd's band. Boyd said of Cooper: "He was the best guitar I ever played with... just as good.. as any guitar player I ever heard.... [He] could play, he could go from John Lee Hooker to Charlie Parker... He was that kind of musician. He knew how to pick anything." Boyd also said that Cooper was dependent on alcohol.

Cooper died in hospital in Iowa City in 1964, at the age of 39, from pneumonitis. In 2024 the Killer Blues Headstone Project placed the headstone for Echford "Lee" Cooper at Restvale Cemetery in Alsip, Illinois.

== Discography ==
With Howlin' Wolf

- Moanin' in the Moonlight (Chess, 1951-59 [1959])
- More Real Folk Blues (Chess, 1953-56 [1967])

With others

- Big Bill Broonzy and Washboard Sam (Chess, 1953 [1962])
