= About Them Shoes =

Studio album by Hubert Sumlin
- Released: 2005
- Genre: Blues
- Label: Tone-Cool
- Producer: Rob Fraboni, Ben Elliott

Hubert Sumlin chronology
Do the Don't (2003)	About Them Shoes (2005)	Midnight Memphis Sun (2010)

About Them Shoes is an album by the American musician Hubert Sumlin, released in 2005. It was delayed for four years due to litigation. According to Sumlin, the album title was inspired by something Levon Helm said in the studio; on other occasions, he attributed the saying to his father.

The album peaked at No. 7 on Billboard's Top Blues Albums chart. Sumlin supported it with a North American tour. About Them Shoes was nominated for a Grammy Award for "Best Traditional Blues Album". It won a Blues Music Award for best "Traditional Blues Album".

== Production ==
About Them Shoes was produced by Rob Fraboni and Ben Elliott. Seven of the album's songs are associated with Muddy Waters, four with Howlin' Wolf; Sumlin was taught a few of the Waters songs by Otis Spann. Sumlin played lead guitar on all of the tracks. David Johansen sang on the cover of Willie Dixon's "The Same Thing". Blondie Chaplin sang on "Look What You've Done". Helm played drums on eight tracks. Keith Richards, who helped plan the album and chose to lean on the Waters songbook, sang on "Still a Fool". Eric Clapton sang and played guitar on "I'm Ready". Sumlin sang on the closing track, the acoustic "This Is the End, Little Girl"; Richards played bass. Michael "Mudcat" Ward played bass on most of the tracks. Paul Oscher played harmonica. Waters band alumni James Cotton and Bob Margolin also contributed.

== Critical reception ==
Professional ratings
Review scores
Source	Rating
AllMusic	3.5/5 stars
Detroit Free Press	3/4 stars
The Encyclopedia of Popular Music	3/5 stars
The Nelson Mail	B+
Orlando Sentinel	4/5 stars
The Penguin Guide to Blues Recordings	3/4 stars
Philadelphia Daily News	B
The Post and Courier	A
USA Today	3/4 stars

The Lincoln Journal Star praised "Sumlin's spare but emotional guitar work," writing that he goes "for a laid-back groove rather than overheated flash." The Detroit Free Press determined that, "though an obvious labor of love for all involved, it remains Sumlin's show throughout." The Washington Post said that, "playing finger-style electric guitar, [Sumlin] laces these tracks with a peculiar assortment of rubbery note bends, skittish triplets, stinging slides and vibrato-ringing tones." The Chicago Tribune wrote that "the result is surprisingly unflashy and elegantly simple, as everybody plays his role and defers to Sumlin."

The Christian Science Monitor noted that Sumlin "seems to be having the rollicking good time of his long and prolific career on this disc." The Independent concluded that About Them Shoes will "put you in mind of Johnny Winter's last-gasp repointing of Muddy in the late '70s... No bad thing." The Post and Courier stated that, "even in his later years, Sumlin can still make his guitar scream and growl." The Boston Globe opined that "the overall results are more archival than incendiary, but if you like old-school electric blues, this will be a familiar tonic."

AllMusic wrote: "About Them Shoes could have taken the marquee talent and gone for a glitzy platform to bring Hubert Sumlin into the mainstream. Instead, they dive headfirst into what this music is all about, and in doing so have come up with a mini-masterpiece."

== Track listing ==
No.	Title	Writer(s)	Length
1.	"I'm Ready" (featuring Eric Clapton, vocals, guitar)	Willie Dixon	4:22
2.	"Still a Fool" (featuring Keith Richards, vocals, guitar)	Muddy Waters	5:22
3.	"She's into Something"	Carl Wright	3:10
4.	"Iodine in My Coffee"	Waters	5:05
5.	"Look What You've Done"	Waters	3:38
6.	"Come Home Baby"	Waters	4:34
7.	"Evil"	Dixon	4:48
8.	"Long Distance Call" (featuring Clapton, vocals, guitar)	Waters	5:30
9.	"The Same Thing" (featuring David Johansen, vocals)	Dixon	3:49
10.	"Don't Go No Farther"	Dixon	3:05
11.	"I Love the Life I Live, I Live the Life I Love" (featuring Richards, backing vocals, guitar)	Dixon	3:56
12.	"Walkin' Thru the Park" (featuring Johansen, vocals)	Waters	3:27
13.	"This Is the End, Little Girl"	Hubert Sumlin	3:38
Total length:			54:24

== Personnel ==
- Hubert Sumlin – lead guitar (all tracks), vocals (13)
- Mudcat Ward – bass (1, 3–12)
- Paul Nowinksi – bass (13)
- Levon Helm – drums (1, 3–8, 10, 12)
- Bob Margolin – guitar (1, 3–8, 10, 12)
- Paul Oscher – harmonica (1, 4–12), vocals (6), slide guitar (7)
- George Receli – percussion (1, 3–6, 10), drums (2, 9, 11), vocals (3, 11)
- David Maxwell – piano (1, 3–6, 8–12)
- Eric Clapton – guitar (1, 8), vocals (1, 8)
- Blondie Chaplin – bass (1), vocals (5), backing vocals (11), percussion (7–9, 11)
- Keith Richards – guitar (2, 11, 13), vocals (2), backing vocals (11)
- James Cotton – harmonica (3)
- Nathaniel Peterson – vocals (4, 7, 10)
- David Johansen – vocals (9, 12)
