= Evil (Howlin' Wolf song) =

1954 single by Howlin' Wolf

"Evil Is Goin' On"

Single by Howlin' Wolf

from the album Moanin' in the Moonlight
- B-side: "Baby How Long"
- Released: 1954
- Recorded: 1954
- Studio: Chess, Chicago
- Genre: Chicago blues
- Length: 2:55
- Label: Chess
- Songwriter: Willie Dixon
- Producers: Leonard Chess, Phil Chess, Willie Dixon

Howlin' Wolf singles chronology
"Baby How Long" (1954)	"Evil Is Goin' On" (1954)	"Forty Four" (1954)

"Evil", sometimes listed as "Evil (Is Going On)", is a Chicago blues song written by Willie Dixon. Howlin' Wolf recorded the song in Chicago for Chess Records in 1954. It was included on the 1959 compilation album Moanin' in the Moonlight. When he re-recorded it for The Howlin' Wolf Album in 1969, "Evil" became Wolf's last charting single, reaching number 43 on the Billboard R&B chart.

Howlin' Wolf first recorded the song at Chess' studio in Chicago on May 25, 1954, with sidemen Hubert Sumlin and Jody Williams on guitars, Otis Spann on piano, Willie Dixon on double-bass, and Earl Phillips on drums. Wolf achieves a coarse, emotional performance with his strained singing, lapsing into falsetto. The song, a twelve-bar blues, is punctuated with a syncopated backbeat, brief instrumental improvisations, upper-end piano figures, and intermittent blues harp provided by Wolf. The lyrics caution about the "evil" that takes place in a man's home when he is away, concluding with "you better watch your happy home".
