= Michael "Mudcat" Ward =

American songwriter

- Born: 1954 (age 71–72); Lewiston, Maine, U.S.
- Genres: Blues
- Occupations: Musician; songwriter
- Instruments: Bass guitar, double bass, piano
- Years active: 1970s–present
- Label: Various

Michael "Mudcat" Ward (born 1954) is an American blues bassist, pianist and songwriter. Primarily he plays both the double bass and bass guitar, although he has recorded tracks playing the piano. Ward has been a member of Sugar Ray and the Bluetones for over 40 years and has had concurrent spells with Ronnie Earl and the Broadcasters. Ward has gained two Blues Music Awards from the Blues Foundation, Memphis, TN in his own name, and has participated in the recording of over 60 albums.

Ward has played in the support band for Hubert Sumlin, Junior Wells, Buddy Guy, Memphis Slim, James Cotton, Lowell Fulson, Otis Rush, Big Mama Thornton, Big Walter Horton, J. B. Hutto, and Big Joe Turner, in addition to recording two albums with Pinetop Perkins.

== Biography ==
He was born in Lewiston, Maine, United States. Ward attended Hampshire College in Amherst, Massachusetts, and undertook a Master's degree at Tufts University in Medford, Massachusetts. He befriended Ronnie Earl and, in 1978, they formed a band named the Hound Dogs who became the house band at the Speakeasy Blues Club in Cambridge, Massachusetts. They backed Big Mama Thornton among others, before Earl and Ward became part of the Broadcasters. Ward had previously had some live performances playing the piano, but when advised that the only band he could find playing the blues needed a bassist, he pawned his electric piano for a bass guitar and, within a week, was playing with them.

Baron Records issued the debut self-titled Sugar Ray and the Bluenotes album in 1980. Ward found himself with a split existence as the band, with usually a similar line-up, also performed as Ronnie Earl and the Broadcasters. That latter combination released their debut album, Deep Blues, in 1985. Earl decided to broaden the band's prominence by backing veteran blues musicians. Consequently, Ward had the experience of providing his bassist backing to Junior Wells, Big Walter Horton (with whom they recorded two albums), Otis Rush, Big Joe Turner, J. B. Hutto, Sunnyland Slim, Hubert Sumlin, and Roosevelt Sykes. Sugar Ray and the Bluetones record label also paid to fly Jimmy Rogers to New England for several shows and, when Rogers returned later, he asked Ward to play in his backing ensemble. Ward stated "those were like working vacations for him in the summertime".

Over the years, Ward wrote a number of song that appeared on albums such as "Hope Valley" on Knockout (1989); "Burial Season" and "From Now on This Morning (11 September)", both from Sugar Ray and the Bluetones featuring Monster Mike Welch (2003); plus "(I'm Gonna Break Into) Folsom Prison" on Hands Across the Table (2005); and "It's Never as Bad as It Looks" on Living Tear to Tear (2014). In 1994, Ward organized the Rounder Records project for Dick Curless, which led to release of the final Curless album, Traveling Through. Ward played bass on the record; issued in 1995 before Curless died a few months later. Sugar Ray left the Bluenotes for a while in 1997, and created the opportunity for Ward to record albums with Eric Bibb, Rory Block and Maria Muldaur, plus more albums with Ronnie Earl, and in 1987 he appeared in the Hubert Sumlin documentary, Living The Blues.

Showing a different talent, Ward wrote a biography of Ellison Brown in 2006 entitled, Ellison "Tarzan" Brown: The Narragansett Indian That Twice Won the Boston Marathon.

In 2014, Ward joined another three of the band's original line-up to record the Bluetones album, Living Tear to Tear, which was issued by Severn Records. In 2016, the Bluenotes were inducted in the Rhode Island Music Hall of Fame. In the same year, Ward was nominated in the 'Instrumentalist - Bass' category at the Blues Music Awards, in which he was the recipient in both 2018 and 2020. In the 2021 Blues Music Awards, he has another nomination in the same category. The 'virtual' ceremony took place on June 6, 2021.

Ward has more than 60 album credits to date, including Sumlin's 2014 Grammy Award-nominated, About Them Shoes, plus Sugar Ray and the Bluetones album, Too Far from the Bar (Severn Records, 2020).
