= Moanin' at Midnight =

1951 blues song by Howlin' Wolf

Single by Howlin' Wolf
- B-side: "How Many More Years"
- Released: August 1951
- Recorded: July 1951
- Studio: Memphis Recording Service (Memphis, Tennessee)
- Genre: Blues
- Label: Chess
- Songwriter: Chester Burnett a.k.a. Howlin' Wolf (Originally credited to Carl Germany)
- Producer: Sam Phillips

Howlin' Wolf singles chronology
"Moanin' at Midnight" (1951)	"Riding In The Moonlight" (1951)

"Moanin' at Midnight" is a blues song written and recorded by Howlin' Wolf in 1951. The recording was released on Chess Records as his debut single. It charted on Billboard's R&B chart, but the B-side, "How Many More Years," became the popular side of the record.

== Recording and release ==
Chester Burnett began performing as blues musician Howlin' Wolf in 1948. He formed a band in West Memphis, Arkansas and performed locally. There he was discovered by Clarksdale native Ike Turner. After Turner and his band the Kings of Rhythm recorded "Rocket 88" for Sam Phillips in 1951, he brought Howlin' Wolf to record for Phillips in Memphis, Tennessee.

Howlin' Wolf recorded a session for Phillips at his Memphis Recording Service in July 1951. The band consisted of Howlin' Wolf singing and playing harmonica with Ike Turner on piano, Willie Johnson on guitar, and Willie Steele on drums. Phillips described "Moanin' at Midnight" as "the most different record I ever heard." Phillips had not yet founded Sun Records, so he leased his recordings to Chess Records. Chess released "Moanin' at Midnight" in August 1951, with "How Many More Years" as the B-side. "Moanin' at Midnight" reached No. 10 on the Billboard Most Played Juke Box R&B Records chart on November 10, 1951. "How Many More Years" grew in popularity and peaked at No. 4 on the Most Played Juke Box R&B Records chart in March 1952.

Turner, who was also a talent scout for the Bihari brothers at Modern Records, took Howlin' Wolf to record another version of "Moanin' at Midnight" at radio station KWEM in West Memphis. It was released on the subsidiary RPM Records as "Morning at Midnight" in September 1951, the B-side to "Riding In The Moonlight." This caused a conflict between the Chess brothers and the Bihari brothers. Howlin' Wolf recorded a few more singles for RPM, but by 1952, he was recording exclusively for Chess.

Howlin' Wolf is the credited songwriter on the RPM release, but the Chess single was originally credited to Carl Germany, who was a disc jockey and dance promoter in Chicago. Later reissues of the recordings have been revised to credit to Chester Burnett.

"Moanin' at Midnight" and "How Many More Years" later appeared on Howlin' Wolf's debut album Moanin' in the Moonlight (1959). "Morning at Midnight" and "Riding in the Moonlight" appeared on the compilation Howling Wolf Sings the Blues (1962).
