= Home (Sheryl Crow song) =

1997 single by Sheryl Crow

Single by Sheryl Crow

from the album Sheryl Crow
- B-side: "Sweet Rosalyn" (live); "I Shall Believe" (live); "Redemption Day" (live)
- Released: September 30, 1997
- Studio: Kingsway (New Orleans); Sunset Sound (Los Angeles)
- Genre: Folk
- Length: 4:51
- Label: A&M
- Songwriter: Sheryl Crow
- Producer: Sheryl Crow

Sheryl Crow singles chronology
"A Change Would Do You Good" (1997)	"Home" (1997)	"Tomorrow Never Dies" (1997)

Music video
- "Home" on YouTube

"Home" is a song from American musician Sheryl Crow's 1996 self-titled album. Written and produced by Crow, the folk ballad was released as the final single from the album on September 30, 1997, by A&M Records, and it was later included on her greatest hits album The Very Best of Sheryl Crow (2003). "Home" was released commercially only in Europe. It became Crow's ninth top-40 hit in both Canada and the United Kingdom, peaking at numbers 40 and 25, respectively. A black-and-white music video directed by Samuel Bayer was made for the song.

== Composition ==
"Home" is a folk ballad, and its lyrics describe the stresses of a failing marriage. According to the digital sheet music published at Musicnotes, "Home" is written in the key of G major and plays in common time at a slow tempo of 80 beats per minute.

== Critical reception ==
Larry Flick from Billboard magazine wrote, "After several rock-fueled singles, Crow drops the volume and tempo to a soft-rock tone for this harshly intimate tune. Her hushed, evocative vocal proves that ya don't have to shriek to stir a listener's emotions. In fact, her whispered line "my house is full of lies" is about as intense or powerful as anything you're likely to hear right now. She is supported by an accessible shuffle beat and guitar lines that mingle warm, acoustic threads with sharp, bluesy electric licks. Any station that played the hit 'Strong Enough' has no excuse but to give this superior recording a fair shot."

== Release and chart performance ==
Although "Home" was serviced to American radio stations on September 30, 1997, it failed to appear on any Billboard charts; however, it did chart in Canada. On November 3, 1997, the song debuted at number 63 on Canada's RPM 100 Hit Tracks chart. Afterwards, it rose and fell inside the top 60 until climbing to its peak of number 40 on January 12, 1998. It then dropped to number 87 the following issue, its final week on the ranking. It was also aired on Canadian adult contemporary stations, eventually reaching a peak of number 43 on the RPM Adult Contemporary Tracks listing. On October 6, 1997, "Home" was released in the United Kingdom, debuting at its peak of number 25 on the UK Singles Chart six days later and spending two weeks in the top 100.

== Music video ==
The black-and-white music video for the song was directed by Samuel Bayer, and features Crow performing on a village car racing festival. Several villagers are portrayed, sharing their definitions of what 'home' is for them with the viewer. At the end of the video, Crow ends up covered in mud thrown around by the racing cars.

== Track listings ==
UK CD1

1. "Home" (album version)
2. "Strong Enough" (WXRT live)
3. "Sweet Rosalyn" (live from Shepherd's Bush Empire in London) – 5:16
4. "I Shall Believe" (WXRT live)

UK CD2

1. "Home" (album version)
2. "Hard to Make a Stand" (WXRT live)
3. "Can't Cry Anymore" (WXRT live)
4. "Redemption Day" (WXRT live)

UK CD-ROM single

1. "Home" (album version)
2. "Sweet Rosalyn" (CD-ROM of home video)

European CD single

1. "Home" (album version) – 4:51
2. "Sweet Rosalyn" (live from Shepherd's Bush Empire in London) – 5:16

== Credits and personnel ==
Credits are lifted from the UK CD1 liner notes and the Sheryl Crow album booklet.

Studios

- Recorded at Kingsway Studios (New Orleans) and Sunset Sound (Los Angeles)
- Mastered at Gateway Mastering (Portland, Maine, US)

Personnel

- Sheryl Crow – writing, bass, Wurlitzer, production
- Jeff Trott – guitar
- Brian MacLeod – drums
- Trina Shoemaker – recording
- Tchad Blake – mixing
- Bob Ludwig – mastering

== Charts ==
Chart (1997–1998)	Peak position
Canada Top Singles (RPM)	40
Canada Adult Contemporary (RPM)	43
Europe (Eurochart Hot 100)	83
Scottish Singles Sales (Official Charts)	20
UK Singles (Official Charts)	25

== Release history ==
Region	Date	Format(s)	Label(s)	Ref.
United States	September 30, 1997	Contemporary hit radio	A&M	
United Kingdom	October 6, 1997	CD	A&M	
