= Sean Chambers (musician) =

American singer

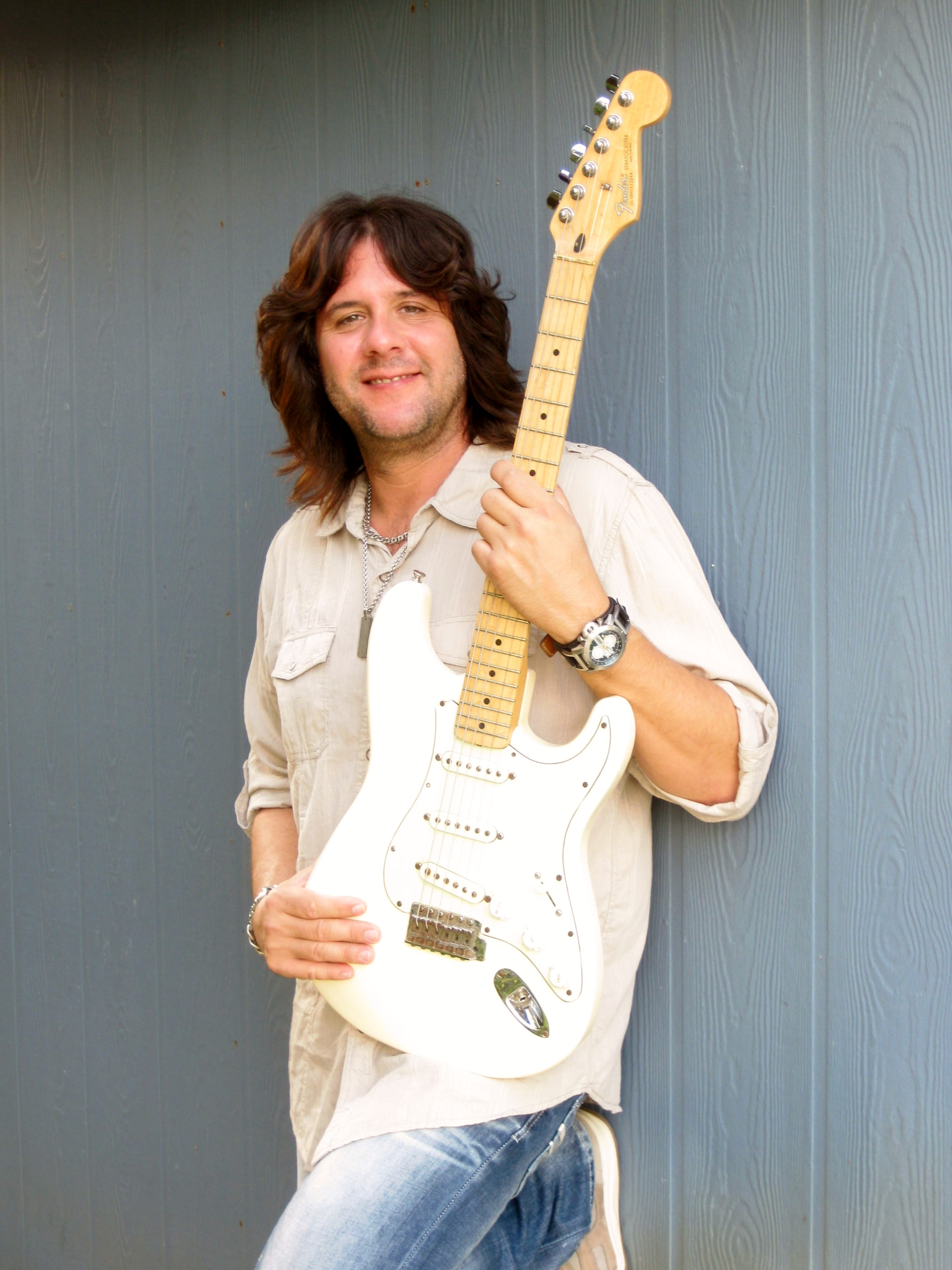

Background information
- Born: Florida, United States
- Genres: Blues rock
- Occupations: Singer, guitarist, and songwriter
- Instruments: Vocals, guitar
- Years active: 1998–present
- Label: Various
- Website: seanchambers.com

Sean Chambers is an American blues rock singer, guitarist, and songwriter. He has released eight albums since 1998, with the more recent offerings, Trouble & Whiskey (2017) and Welcome to My Blues (2018), appearing in the US Billboard Blues Albums Chart.

His main guitar playing influences are the work of Jimi Hendrix and Stevie Ray Vaughan, and his early professional music experience was gained while touring for four years backing Hubert Sumlin. Chambers has worked with a variety of blues musicians, who include Derek Trucks, Gregg Allman, Kim Simmonds, Tab Benoit, Jeff Healey, Leslie West, Rick Derringer, Pat Travers, Kim Wilson, Bobby Bland, Walter Trout, Big Bill Morganfield, Koko Taylor, Ike Turner, and Robert Cray.

== Life and career ==
Chambers was born on the Gulf Coast of Florida, United States, and grew up listening to music by Johnny Winter, Freddie King, B. B. King and Albert King, Eric Clapton, and Jeff Beck. In the early 1990s, Chambers fronted his own Stevie Ray Vaughan tribute band, who played around the local club scene. In 1998, Chambers debut album, Strong Temptation, was released on Vestige Records. One reviewer noted that it "does have glimmers of originality, however, it is still heavy on the SRV influence"... "blues with a hard edge and never a dull moment". The same year Chambers was asked to back Hubert Sumlin at a blues festival in Memphis, and this led to him working with Sumlin as his guitarist and bandleader for the next four years. Chambers made a guest appearance on Sumlin's 2004 album, About Them Shoes, issued by Tone-Cool Records. During this time, the UK's Guitarist magazine cited Chambers as "one of the top 50 blues guitarists of the last century." Chambers had performed with his own band at the 2002 Tampa Bay Blues Festival.

His next release was 2004's Humble Spirits, issued on Rockview Records. Ten Til Midnight followed in October 2009, to positive reviews and it stayed on the Living Blues chart for three months. It was the first of three consecutive releases on Blue Heat Records. The live album, Live from the Long Island Blues Warehouse (2011), incorporated some material from Strong Temptation and Humble Spirits, and was a collection of mainly fast tempo blues rock, except for the cover of The Kinsey Report's "Full Moon on Main Street". AllMusic noted that "his playing is sufficiently accomplished to satisfy blues fans who have heard others play in this style before him". The recording also included a cover of Robert Johnson's "Dust My Broom". It was nominated for a Blues411 Jimi Award for 'Best Live Blues Album of 2011.' Guitar Player magazine gave a full page feature on Chambers in their February 2012 edition, and in the same month Vintage Guitar magazine printed a two-page feature story.

In 2013, Chambers went to Kevin McKendree's Rock House Studios to record and, in October that year, he released The Rock House Sessions. It was nominated for a Blues Blast Music Award as 'Best Blues Rock Album of the year'. On March 17, 2017, Chambers issued his sixth album Trouble & Whiskey on the American Showplace Music label. In April 2017, Trouble & Whiskey spent one week at No. 11 in the Billboard Blues Albums Chart. Chambers's album, Welcome to My Blues, was released on October 19, 2018, again on American Showplace Music. In addition to eight Chambers-penned new songs, the collection included cover versions of "Cherry Red Wine" (Luther Allison), and "All Night Long" (T-Bone Walker). Ben Elliott produced both of those releases. Welcome to my Blues spent one week at No. 9 in the Billboard Blues Albums Chart in November 2018.

His latest album, That's What I'm Talkin About: Tribute to Hubert Sumlin, was released on July 9, 2021 this time on Quarto Valley Records, and is a tribute to his friend and mentor Hubert Sumlin. The album consists of nine tracks that were frequently performed when Chambers was backing Sumlin in the late 1990s, and one original song written by Chambers.

Chambers continues to tour with his band and lives in Southwest Florida. His wife, Karen, handles his merchandise and sales while Chambers is away.

== Discography ==
=== Albums ===
Year	Title	Record label(s)
1998	Strong Temptation	Vestige Records
2004	Humble Spirits	Rockview Records
2009	Ten Til Midnight	Blue Heat Records
2011	Live from the Long Island Blues Warehouse	Blue Heat Records
2013	The Rock House Sessions	Blue Heat Records
2017	Trouble & Whiskey	American Showplace Music
2018	Welcome to My Blues	American Showplace Music
2021	That's What I'm Talkin About: Tribute to Hubert Sumlin	Quarto Valley Records
2025	Live from Daryl's House Club	Quarto Valley Records

== See also ==
- List of blues rock musicians
