= A Change Would Do You Good =

1997 single by Sheryl Crow

Single by Sheryl Crow

from the album Sheryl Crow
- Released: May 13, 1997
- Studio: Kingsway (New Orleans); Sunset Sound (Los Angeles)
- Genre: Rock
- Length: 3:50
- Label: A&M
- Songwriters: Sheryl Crow; Jeff Trott; Brian MacLeod
- Producer: Sheryl Crow

Sheryl Crow singles chronology
"Hard to Make a Stand" (1997)	"A Change Would Do You Good" (1997)	"Home" (1997)

Music video
- "A Change Would Do You Good" on YouTube

"A Change Would Do You Good" (also known as "A Change") is the fourth single from American singer-songwriter Sheryl Crow's 1996 self-titled album. The song uses a series of non sequitur lyrics to describe what one should change in life. In the United States, the song peaked at number 19 on the Billboard Hot 100 Airplay chart and topped the Billboard Triple-A chart for six weeks. Internationally, it became Crow's third top-five single from the album in Canada, where it reached number two, and peaked at number eight in the United Kingdom.

== Background and lyrics ==
In an interview with Songfacts, guitarist Jeff Trott revealed "A Change Would Do You Good" was written in New Orleans during a six-month stay with co-writers Sheryl Crow and Brian MacLeod. The group decided to create a song by looking into classic soul music for inspiration, specifically by the Staple Singers and Mavis Staples. Eventually, the trio came up with so many lyric ideas that they resorted to drawing them out of a hat, putting together similar lines so they made sense.

The lyrics of the song are mostly abstract, but they work together to highlight what one needs to change in life. Each verse also has a meaning. According to Trott, the first verse is about music producer Bill Bottrell, who left in the middle of the album's production, angering Crow. Trott admitted that even though the lyrics were derogatory, they were more playful than harsh. The second verse was inspired by Madonna—who had begun to tone down her sexual image during the song's conception—as well as a few other people who were not named. Crow decided to make the final verse about herself but had to convince Trott and MacLeod to do so.

== Critical reception ==
Billboard wrote, "Sheryl Crow's current eponymous collection proves to be knee-deep in solid radio entries. The set's third single is yet another infectious toe-tapper that has the fun vibe of a freewheeling campfire sing-along-but with the kind of biting and intelligent lyrics that have elevated Crow miles above the current glut of guitar-slingin' women. There's no question that pop and mainstream rock programmers will be going out of the way to put this winner on the air ASAP." A reviewer from Music Week rated the song three out of five, stating that "Crow is in familiar country-lite territory". David Sinclair from The Times described it as a "typical mid-tempo chug delivered in her tough but sexy drawl". In 2017, Billboard ranked the song number five on their list of the 10 greatest Sheryl Crow songs, and in 2023, The Guardian ranked the song number eight on their list of the 20 greatest Sheryl Crow songs.

== Music videos ==
Several versions of a music video were shot. The first video, directed by Crow and Lance Acord, features Crow standing in the middle of Gay Street in New York City playing a guitar while a second Crow is throwing her possessions (and eventually herself) out of an apartment building window. This video appears on the DVD The Very Best of Sheryl Crow and was shot in black and white.

The second video, directed by Michel Gondry, shows Crow similar to the character Samantha Stephens from the TV sitcom fantasy Bewitched. She switches around characters' lives, such as a cab driver and teen garage band singer. Notable guests include Mary Lynn Rajskub, Heather Matarazzo, Jeff Garlin, Ellen DeGeneres, Molly Shannon, Andy Dick and Toby Huss. This video appears on the DVD compilation Michel Gondry 2: More Videos (Before and After DVD 1). This video received negative reaction from critics due to too much dialogue during the song, and was "jeered" by TV Guide. The video was later re-edited with less dialogue.

The final video is taken from a VH1 live performance.

== Live performances ==
Crow performed the song at President Obama's 2008 Inaugural Ball for the Midwest States. She also performed the song on her live album Sheryl Crow and Friends: Live from Central Park.

== Track listings ==
- UK CD1 and Australasian CD single
1. "A Change Would Do You Good"
2. "Hard to Make a Stand" (live from Shepherd's Bush Empire)
3. "On the Outside" (live from Shepherd's Bush Empire)
4. "A Change Would Do You Good" (live from Shepherd's Bush Empire)
- UK CD2
1. "A Change Would Do You Good"
2. "Everyday Is a Winding Road" (live from Shepherd's Bush Empire)
3. "Can't Cry Anymore" (live from Shepherd's Bush Empire)
4. "Leaving Las Vegas" (live from Shepherd's Bush Empire)
- UK CD3
1. "A Change Would Do You Good"
2. "Everyday Is a Winding Road"
3. "If It Makes You Happy"
4. "Hard to Make a Stand"
- European CD single
1. "A Change Would Do You Good" (LP version) – 3:50
2. "Hard to Make a Stand" (live from Shepherd's Bush Empire) – 4:23

== Credits and personnel ==
Credits are lifted from the UK CD1 liner notes and the Sheryl Crow album booklet.

Studios

- Recorded at Kingsway Studios (New Orleans) and Sunset Sound (Los Angeles)
- Mastered at Gateway Mastering (Portland, Maine, US)

Personnel

- Sheryl Crow – writing, Hammond organ, bass, production
- Jeff Trott – writing, acoustic guitars
- Brian MacLeod – writing, loop
- Davey Faragher – fuzz bass
- Todd Wolfe – electric guitar
- Trina Shoemaker – recording
- Tchad Blake – mixing
- Bob Ludwig – mastering

== Charts ==
=== Weekly charts ===
Chart (1997)	Peak position
Australia (ARIA)	74
Canada Top Singles (RPM)	2
Canada Adult Contemporary (RPM)	7
Canada Rock/Alternative (RPM)	11
Europe (Eurochart Hot 100)	21
Iceland (Íslenski Listinn Topp 40)	14
Quebec (ADISQ)	3
Scottish Singles Sales (Official Charts)	6
UK Singles (Official Charts)	8
US Radio Songs (Billboard)	19
US Adult Alternative Airplay (Billboard)	1
US Adult Pop Airplay (Billboard)	5
US Alternative Airplay (Billboard)	25
US Pop Airplay (Billboard)	16

=== Year-end charts ===
Chart (1997)	Position
Canada Top Singles (RPM)	13
Canada Adult Contemporary (RPM)	38
US Adult Top 40 (Billboard)	17
US Top 40/Mainstream (Billboard)	48
US Triple-A (Billboard)	12

== Release history ==
Region	Date	Format(s)	Label(s)	Ref.
United States	May 13, 1997	Contemporary hit radio	A&M	
United Kingdom	June 30, 1997	CD	A&M	
