= Return of a Legend =

Studio album by Jody Williams
- Released: 2002
- Genre: Blues
- Label: Evidence
- Producer: Dick Shurman

Jody Williams chronology
Return of a Legend (2002)	You Left Me In the Dark (2004)

Return of a Legend is an album by the American musician Jody Williams, released in 2002. Williams had not recorded music in around 30 years; he was inspired in part to return to the studio after listening to his playing on a 1964 tape he found at his house. He supported the album with a North American tour.

The album was nominated for two W. C. Handy Awards, for "Traditional Blues Album" and "Comeback Blues Album", winning for the latter.

== Production ==
The album was produced by Dick Shurman. Williams played "Red Lightnin'", his Gibson guitar. Billy Boy Arnold and Tinsley Ellis were among the musicians backing Williams. "Jive Spot" is a version of Williams's song "Five Spot", which he had first recorded with Otis Spann.

== Critical reception ==
Professional ratings
Review scores
Source	Rating
The Age	5/5 stars
AllMusic	4/5 stars
The Encyclopedia of Popular Music	4/5 stars
Ottawa Citizen	4.5/5 stars
The Penguin Guide to Blues Recordings	3/4 stars

The Age called the album "a superlative listening experience, up there with Magic Sam's sizzling 1967 West Side Soul." Billboard deemed it "a little classic, marked by sleek solo work and delightful comic songs." The Virginian-Pilot determined that "the R&B-soaked blues is heartfelt, swinging and sounds fresh ... Williams' taut, note-bending playing never sounded better."

The Times concluded that "Williams displays a skill and a talent that can still amaze." The Ottawa Citizen stated that "he's lost little, if any, of his slashing style and, in fact, the seasoning sounds good on him... Classic instrumentals like his rhumba-style 'Lucky Lou', and the straight-ahead 'Moanin' for Molasses', sound better."

AllMusic wrote that it's "a tasteful showcase for one of the blues' lesser-known yet classic stars."

== Track listing ==
No.	Title	Length
1.	"Lucky Lou"
2.	"Come Over to My House"
3.	"Lifelong Lover"
4.	"You May"
5.	"Moanin' for Molasses"
6.	"Monkey Business"
7.	"I'm Coming Back In Again"
8.	"She Found a Fool and Bumped His Head"
9.	"Jive Spot"
10.	"Brown Eyes and Big Thighs"
11.	"Wham Bam Thank You Ma'am"
12.	"What You Gonna Do?"
13.	"Henpecked and Happy"
