= Masters of War (album) =

Studio album by Mountain
- Released: July 24, 2007
- Genre: Blues rock, hard rock
- Label: Big Rack Records
- Producer: Leslie West

Mountain chronology
Mystic Fire (2002)	Masters of War (2007)

Professional ratings
Review scores
Source	Rating
AllMusic	3/5 stars

Masters of War is the eighth and final studio album by American hard rock band Mountain, released in 2007. The album consists entirely of Bob Dylan covers.

== Track listing ==
All tracks composed by Bob Dylan

1. "Masters of War" (guest vocal by Ozzy Osbourne) 4:38
2. "Serve Somebody" (guest lead guitar by Warren Haynes) 3:55
3. "Blowin' in the Wind" (Heavy version) 5:37
4. "Everything Is Broken" 4:09
5. "Highway 61 Revisited" 3:27
6. "Heart of Mine" 3:56
7. "Subterranean Homesick Blues" 4:20
8. "The Times They Are A-Changin'" (guest guitar by Warren Haynes) 4:59
9. "Seven Days" 3:29
10. "Mr. Tambourine Man" 5:31
11. "Like a Rolling Stone" 3:29
12. "Blowin' in the Wind" (Acoustic version) 3:56

== Personnel ==
- Leslie West – guitar, vocals, arranger, producer
- Richie Scarlet – bass
- Corky Laing – drums, vocals

with:

- Brian John Mitchell – piano, organ, accordion
- Kenny Aaronson – bass
- Todd Wolfe – rhythm guitar
- Ozzy Osbourne – vocals on "Masters of War"
- Warren Haynes – guitar on "Serve Somebody" & "The Times They Are A-Changin'"

Additional personnel

- Doug Davis – executive producer
- Ben Elliott – engineer
- Chris Tsangarides – mix
- Dave Stephens – art direction & graphics

== See also ==
- List of songs written by Bob Dylan
- List of artists who have covered Bob Dylan songs
