= Jay Hooks =

American songwriter (born 1967)

- Born: Jay Hooks; November 12, 1967 (age 58); Houston, Texas, United States
- Genres: Texas blues, electric blues, blues rock
- Occupation(s): Guitarist, singer, songwriter
- Instrument(s): Guitar, vocals
- Years active: Late mid 80s–present
- Labels: Sunburst Records, Provogue Records

Jay Hooks (born November 12, 1967) is an American Texas blues and electric blues guitarist, singer and songwriter. After gaining national exposure playing in Lavelle White's backing ensemble, Hooks has released three albums to date, appeared on German television and undertaken various tours, including one in Europe.

== Life and career ==
Hooks was born in Houston, Texas, United States. He found early musical inspiration from the recordings of fellow Texans Albert Collins, Billy Gibbons and Stevie Ray Vaughan. In the late 1980s, Hooks played in the bars of Houston, before being asked to play in Lavelle White's backing band. He played on her national tours in 1996, before forming his own band and going solo the following year. In 1997, Hooks recorded his debut album, Hooked Up, at SugarHill Recording Studios in Houston. AllMusic noted that Hooked Up contained "a collection of gritty, rock-tinged electric blues numbers that didn't stray far outside the conventions that his aforementioned guitar heroes had brought into an international spotlight."

The exposure the recording gave Hooks led to a European record executive, Ed van Zyl, offering Hooks a recording contract with the Dutch-based record label Provogue Records. The resulting self-titled album was made under the tutelage of record producer Ben Elliott. Jay Hooks was recorded by the trio of Hooks (guitars, vocals), Marie Del Prete (bass) and Joe Frenchwood (drums). It was released in late 2000. His Texas rock sound was well received by the critics. At the time Hooks was quoted as saying "... I just plug it in and turn it all up, that's what I do..." In 2001, Hooks toured across Europe.

Jerry Gaskill played the drums on Hooks next release, the Red Line album (2002), which was also released by Provogue. Red Line mostly contained songs written by Hooks, apart from his cover of Jimi Hendrix's track, "Freedom". In 2003, Hooks played live on the German television show, Rockpalast.

Hooks performed at the Continental Club in Austin, Texas early in 2015. In April that year, he appeared at the House of Blues in Houston.

In 2025, Tequila & Bullets was released on Joplin Street Music. The album was produced by Matthew R. Johnson, and included the single releases of "Tequila & Bullets", "A Woman Like You", "Lonesome", and "Evinrude Boat Motor".

== Discography ==
Year	Title	Record label
1997	Hooked Up	Sunburst Records
2000	Jay Hooks	Provogue Records
2002	Red Line	Provogue Records
2025	Tequila & Bullets	Joplin Street Music

== See also ==
- List of Texas blues musicians
- List of electric blues musicians
