= How Many More Years =

Single by Howlin' Wolf
- A-side: "Moanin' at Midnight"
- Released: August 1951
- Recorded: July 1951
- Studio: Memphis Recording Service, Memphis, Tennessee
- Genre: Blues
- Length: 2:43
- Label: Chess
- Songwriter: Chester Burnett a.k.a. Howlin' Wolf (Originally credited to Carl Germany)
- Producer: Sam Phillips

Howlin' Wolf singles chronology
"How Many More Years" (1951)	"Riding In The Moonlight" (1951)

"How Many More Years" is a blues song written and originally recorded by Howlin' Wolf in 1951. Recorded at the Memphis Recording Service – which later became the Sun Studio – it was released by Chess Records and reached No. 4 on the Billboard R&B chart. Musician and record producer T Bone Burnett has described "How Many More Years" as "in some ways ... the first rock’n’roll song". It was a double-sided hit with "Moanin' at Midnight", which reached No. 10 on the R&B chart.

== Recording and release ==
After military service, Chester Burnett performed as a blues singer and formed his own band in West Memphis, Arkansas, in 1948, billing himself as "The Howlin' Wolf". He began broadcasting on radio station KWEM in West Memphis, and was brought by Ike Turner to record for Sam Phillips in Memphis, Tennessee.

He recorded "How Many More Years" at the Memphis Recording Service at 706 Union Avenue, Memphis, Tennessee, in or about July 1951, singing and playing harmonica with a band consisting of Ike Turner (piano), Willie Johnson (guitar), and Willie Steele (drums). The repetitious bass-string boogie line resembles the one played in the traditional blues standard "Forty-Four".

Phillips had not yet set up Sun Records and regularly leased his recordings to the Chess label in Chicago. The record was issued as Chess 1479 on 15 August 1951, with "Moanin' at Midnight" as the A-side and "How Many More Years" as the B-side. "Moanin' at Midnight" entered the Billboard R&B chart at No. 10 in November 1951, and was followed four weeks later by "How Many More Years", which became the more popular side. It rose to No. 8 on the Best Selling R&B Records chart in December 1951, and No. 4 on the Most Played Juke Box R&B Records chart on March 1, 1952.

The songwriting for both sides of the record was originally credited to Carl Germany, who was a disc jockey and dance promoter in Chicago. The Chess label occasionally used composer credits on their records to repay favors to local businessmen who had helped their record sales. Later reissues of the recordings have given the songwriting credits to Chester Burnett.

Following the record's success, Burnett moved to Chicago in late 1952, and developed his career further in clubs and through recordings there, with a new band.

== Influence ==
Writer Robert Palmer has cited Willie Johnson's electric guitar work on the track as the first use of the power chord. T-Bone Burnett said of the recording:

The first major breakthrough Sam [Phillips] made was with Howlin' Wolf. That's when he started bringing the bass and drums up loud. Back in those days the bass and drums were background instruments; it was all about the horns and the piano, the melody instruments, and Sam brought the rhythm section right up front, and that became rock 'n' roll. That was a big shift ... In some ways "How Many More Years" by Wolf would be the first rock ’n’ roll song because that has the guitar lick that became the central guitar lick in rock 'n' roll, and that's the first time we heard that played on a distorted guitar. It was an old big band lick, turned into something completely fresh.

"How Many More Times" on Led Zeppelin's 1969 debut album Led Zeppelin references "How Many More Years" (1951), as well as other blues songs including Howlin' Wolf's tune, "You Gonna Wreck My Life".
