= Sheryl Crow (album) =

Studio album by Sheryl Crow
- Released: September 24, 1996
- Studios: Kingsway Studios (New Orleans); The Sound Factory, Sunset Sound (Los Angeles)
- Genres: Rock; folk rock; country rock; blues rock; alternative rock; pop rock
- Length: 56:28
- Label: A&M
- Producer: Sheryl Crow

Sheryl Crow chronology
Tuesday Night Music Club (1993)	Sheryl Crow (1996)	The Globe Sessions (1998)

Singles from Sheryl Crow
- 1. "If It Makes You Happy" Released: September 3, 1996; 2. "Everyday Is a Winding Road" Released: November 18, 1996; 3. "Hard to Make a Stand" Released: March 17, 1997; 4. "A Change Would Do You Good" Released: June 30, 1997; 5. "Home" Released: October 6, 1997

Sheryl Crow is the second studio album by American singer and songwriter Sheryl Crow, released on September 24, 1996, by A&M Records. Unlike its predecessor Tuesday Night Music Club, which was written by a casual collective formed by Crow and several other musicians, Sheryl Crow was entirely produced by Crow, who wrote most of the songs alone or with only two collaborators. Recorded largely at Kingsway Studios in New Orleans, Louisiana, the album covers topics of American life, relationship breakups, and moral and ethical issues, while encompassing a variety of music genres such as rock, blues, alternative rock, country, and folk.

Sheryl Crow was a commercial success, receiving triple platinum certification by both the Recording Industry Association of America (RIAA) and the British Phonographic Industry (BPI). It reached number six on the Billboard 200 and produced five singles, including the international hit "If It Makes You Happy". The album received acclaim from critics, who praised its intricate production and Crow's louder and more assured performance. At the 39th Annual Grammy Awards, the album won Best Rock Album and Crow won Best Female Rock Vocal Performance for the aforementioned single. Retrospectively, it is often regarded as Crow's best album.

== Background and recording ==
Sheryl Crow is the follow-up to Sheryl Crow's 1993 album Tuesday Night Music Club, which was written by a group of musicians known as the "Tuesday Music Club". The group existed as a casual collective formed by Crow and musicians Bill Bottrell, David Baerwald, Kevin Gilbert, Brian MacLeod, David Ricketts, and Dan Schwartz. The album was a commercial success and produced several hit singles, including "All I Wanna Do", "Strong Enough", and "Leaving Las Vegas". It was certified 7× Platinum in the United States and 2× Platinum in the United Kingdom. Crow was also awarded Best New Artist, Best Female Pop Vocal Performance, and Record of the Year at the 37th Annual Grammy Awards.

Tensions between Crow and other members of the group began to arise following Crow's performance of "Leaving Las Vegas" on the Late Show with David Letterman in March 1994. Crow offhandedly agreed with the host when she was asked if the track was autobiographical, even though it was primarily written by Baerwald and based on the book of the same name by his friend John O'Brien. As a result, several members of the Tuesday Music Club group felt betrayed, and O'Brien himself committed suicide three weeks later. Nevertheless, O'Brien's parents insisted that Crow had nothing to do with the tragedy, noting that he "was just mad about it [...] But the problems that drove him toward the end were – you know, that's a long, long bloody trip."

After Tuesday Night Music Club, Crow wanted to prove her authority as a musician. According to her, "My only objective on this record was to get under people's skin, because I was feeling like I had so much shit to hurl at the tape." Work on the new album began at Toad Hall in Pasadena, California, the same studio where Tuesday Night Music Club was recorded, but sessions were then relocated to New Orleans, Louisiana because Crow "was feeling ghosts in that room". Bottrell was designated to produce the record and co-wrote three songs that would appear on the album, but eventually left because he could not sort out his differences with Crow. As a result, Crow took over production duties and wrote most of the songs alone or with only one collaborator. She also played most of the instruments on the album, including bass and guitar work and nearly all the keyboard parts. Most of the album was recorded at Kingsway Studios in New Orleans, although Crow would later return to Los Angeles to complete work at The Sound Factory and Sunset Sound. Audio mastering took place at Gateway Mastering Studios in Portland, Maine.

== Music and lyrics ==
Musically, Sheryl Crow was described as a combination of rock, blues, alternative rock, country, folk, and light hip hop loops. Unlike its predecessor, it also features a more off-balance production and a richer instrumentation, with "lots of fuzz, wurlitzer, hammond, moog. Nothing extreme, perhaps, but almost psychedelic when joined to big mainstream melodies", one critic explained. The album covers topics of American life, relationship breakups, and moral and ethical issues, among others. For example, "Home" is a folk ballad where Crow recounts the emotional difficulties of a deteriorating relationship, while "Superstar" deals with a woman fantasizing about stardom. The song "A Change Would Do You Good", which features hand claps and organ licks, is about the need to escape a constricted life.

The opening track, "Maybe Angels", was described as "a cryptic ode to UFOs and government conspiracies that plays like an X-Files theme song." Crow explained that the song is "an extraterrestrial yarn that finds Kurt Cobain joining John Lennon in heaven's winged choir". The track "Redemption Day" is a protest against the US indifference to the Bosnian War. It was inspired when Crow visited the country as part of a USO trip with Hillary and Chelsea Clinton. The song was later covered by Johnny Cash, appearing on his 2010 posthumous record American VI: Ain't No Grave. The track "Hard to Make a Stand" references abortion, while "Love Is a Good Thing" criticizes Walmart's gun sales policy with the lyrics "Watch out sister/Watch out brother/Watch our children as they kill each other/with a gun they bought at the Wal-Mart discount stores." The song caused some controversy, resulting in Walmart banning sales of the album at their stores.

The album's lead single, "If It Makes You Happy", underwent several different arrangements before being turned into a rock song. According to musician Jeff Trott, who co-wrote the song along with Crow, "It started off as a twangy, David Lynch-esque sort of thing. Then [...] we played it like punk rock, really fast, as well as country and funky. You know, you get a song and put clothes on it to see what looks good and what doesn't, and usually when you find the right one it's pretty obvious. With that song it was real obvious!" Trott initially wrote the song when he was a member of Pete Droge's backing band, but Crow added a second verse and strengthened the melody. Sheryl Crow also has contributions by notable musicians. For example, "Sweet Rosalyn" features saxophone by Steve Berlin of Los Lobos, while "Everyday Is a Winding Road" features harmony vocals by Neil Finn of Crowded House.

== Release ==
Sheryl Crow was released on CD and cassette formats on September 24, 1996. The album reached number six on the US Billboard 200 chart and sold 143,000 copies in the first two weeks of release. As of January 2008, the album had sold 2,400,000 units in the US according to Nielsen SoundScan, and has been certified three-times platinum by the RIAA. In the United Kingdom, Sheryl Crow reached number five on the UK Albums Chart and was certified three-times platinum by the BPI, signifying sales of over 900,000 units. Unlike the American edition, the British edition of the album contains the bonus track "Free Man". Sheryl Crow also reached the top ten in Austria, Belgium, New Zealand, Sweden and Switzerland. In Europe, it was certified platinum by the IFPI. A special edition of the album, entitled Sheryl Crow – Signature Tour Edition, was released in Australia and Japan in 1997. It contains the bonus tracks "Sad Sad World" and an alternate version of "Hard to Make a Stand" as well as a bonus CD with six songs recorded live at Shepherd's Bush Empire in London on November 26, 1996. This 2-CD set was also released as Sheryl Crow – Special Edition in the United Kingdom in 1997.

The song "If It Makes You Happy" was released as the lead single on September 3, 1996, and became an international hit, peaking at number 10 on the Billboard Hot 100 chart and selling 82,000 units in the first two weeks of release. It was also a success in the United Kingdom, where it reached number nine on the UK Singles Chart. Other countries where the single charted include Australia, Canada, France, New Zealand and Switzerland. A music video was made for the song under the direction of Keir McFarlane. "Everyday Is a Winding Road" was released on November 18, 1996, as the album's second single. The song was also a success, reaching number 11 on the Billboard Hot 100 and number 12 on the UK Singles Chart. The tracks "Hard to Make a Stand", "A Change Would Do You Good", and "Home" were released as the album's last three singles. "A Change Would Do You Good" was a modest success, peaking at number 16 on the Mainstream Top 40 and number eight on the UK Singles Chart.

== Critical reception ==
Professional ratings
Review scores
Source	Rating
AllMusic	4.5/5 stars
Chicago Sun-Times	4/4 stars
Entertainment Weekly	A−
The Guardian	3/5 stars
Los Angeles Times	2/4 stars
Pitchfork	8.6/10
Rolling Stone	3.5/5 stars
The Rolling Stone Album Guide	4/5 stars
Slant Magazine	4.5/5 stars
Spin	8/10

Upon release, Sheryl Crow received acclaim from critics. Eric Weisbard of Spin praised the album's production, stating that the record "goes much further" than its predecessor and that its "bigger beats and dirtier guitar/keyboard effects [work] well with Crow's literate hippie-chick persona". David Browne of Entertainment Weekly stated similar pros, commenting: "If there's such a thing as a professional lo-fi album, Sheryl Crow is it." He also noted Crow's louder and more assured singing, concluding that she "doesn't expose that much of herself [...] she's an emotional centrist. But at the very least, she's building a bridge to a lasting career". Writing for The Baltimore Sun, J. D. Considine praised Crow's vocals, especially on "If It Makes You Happy", which he felt was probably the album's best song.

Despite the praise, the last third of the album was considered the weakest part and the song "Ordinary Morning" was considered a poor choice for a closer. Rolling Stone editor David Fricke also criticized the album for being underdeveloped and lacking originality, and unfavorably compared the song "Hard to Make a Stand" to "Tumbling Dice" by the Rolling Stones and "Sweet Jane" by the Velvet Underground. In The Village Voice, Robert Christgau quipped that the album was indebted to "not just Alanis but Tchad", later giving it a "one-star honorable mention" grade. In February 1997, Sheryl Crow was ranked at number 26 in The Village Voice's 1996 Pazz & Jop critics' poll. At the 39th Annual Grammy Awards, the album was awarded Best Rock Album and Crow received the Best Female Rock Vocal Performance award for the song "If It Makes You Happy".

Retrospectively, AllMusic critic Stephen Thomas Erlewine referred to the album as "a postmodern masterpiece of sorts – albeit a mainstream, post-alternative, postmodern masterpiece. It may not be as hip or innovative as, say, the Beastie Boys' Paul's Boutique, but it is as self-referential, pop culture obsessed, and musically eclectic." Sal Cinquemani of Slant Magazine highlighted the album's "quirky, stream-of-conscious lyrics" and elaborate sound collages, stating that "none of [Crow's] other full-length albums have been as consistent, immaculately produced or distinctly modern." In 1999, Rolling Stone selected Sheryl Crow as one of the essential albums of the decade. In 2002, the magazine also ranked it at number 44 in its list of Women in Rock: The 50 Essential Albums. In 2003, the album was featured in the Vital Pop: 50 Essential Pop Albums list by Slant Magazine. In 2008, Entertainment Weekly magazine placed the album at number 39 in their list of Top 100 Best Albums of the past 25 years. In 2020, Rolling Stone ranked Sheryl Crow at number 475 in its list of The 500 Greatest Albums of All Time.

== Track listing ==
All tracks are written by Sheryl Crow, with additional co-writers as noted.

No.	Title	Writer(s)	Length
1.	"Maybe Angels"	Bill Bottrell	4:56
2.	"A Change Would Do You Good"	Jeff Trott; Brian MacLeod	3:50
3.	"Home"		4:51
4.	"Sweet Rosalyn"	Trott	3:58
5.	"If It Makes You Happy"	Trott	5:23
6.	"Redemption Day"		4:27
7.	"Hard to Make a Stand"	Bottrell; Todd Wolfe; R.S. Bryan	3:07
8.	"Everyday Is a Winding Road"	MacLeod; Trott	4:16
9.	"Love Is a Good Thing"	Tad Wadhams	4:43
10.	"Oh Marie"	Bottrell; Trott	3:30
11.	"Superstar"	Trott	4:58
12.	"The Book"	Trott	4:34
13.	"Ordinary Morning"		3:55

Digital bonus tracks / "Signature Tour Edition" and "Special Edition" bonus tracks
No.	Title	Writer(s)	Length
14.	"Sad Sad World"	MacLeod; Trott	4:06
15.	"Hard to Make a Stand" (Alternate Version)	Bottrell; Bryan; Wolfe	3:30

UK release bonus track
No.	Title	Length
16.	"Free Man"	3:21

"Signature Tour Edition" and "Special Edition" Disc 2
No.	Title	Writer(s)	Length
1.	"If It Makes You Happy"	Trott	5:33
2.	"Leaving Las"	Bottrell; David Baerwald; Bottrell	6:45
3.	"Hard to Make a Stand"	Bottrell; Bryan; Wolfe	4:23
4.	"Can't Cry Anymore"	Bottrell	5:33
5.	"Everyday Is a Winding Road"	MacLeod; Trott	4:59
6.	"On the Outside"	Trott	7:58

== Personnel ==
Credits are adapted from AllMusic.

- Sheryl Crow – lead vocals, background vocals, bass guitar, acoustic guitar, electric guitar, harmonium, keyboards, Moog bass, Hammond organ, piano, Wurlitzer, pennyosley, loops, producer
- Jeri Heiden – art direction, design
- Steve Berlin – saxophone
- Ron Black – assistant engineer
- Tchad Blake – engineer, mixing
- R.S. Bryan – wah wah guitar
- Steve Donnelly – dobro, electric guitar
- Dave Douglas – horn
- Davey Faragher – fuzz bass
- Neil Finn – background vocals
- Curtis Fowlkes – horn
- Mitchell Froom – assistant producer, harmonium, horn arrangements, keyboards, string arrangements
- S. "Husky" Höskulds – assistant engineer
- Wally Ingram – drums, djembe
- Cappy Japngie – assistant engineer
- Jim Keltner – drums
- Blair Lamb – engineer
- Bob Ludwig – mastering
- Brian MacLeod – drums, loops
- James Minchin – photography
- John Paterno – assistant engineer
- Stephanie Pfriender – photography
- Josh Roseman – horn
- Dan Rothchild – bass guitar
- Anders Rundblad – bass guitar, acoustic guitar
- Bob Salcedo – engineer
- Jane Scarpantoni – strings
- Trina Shoemaker – engineer
- Bob Stewart – horn
- Steen Sundland – photography
- Pete Thomas – drums
- Jeff Trott – acoustic guitar, electric guitar, background vocals, loop
- Michael Urbano – drums, snare drums, loop
- Tad Wadhams – bass guitar
- Karen Walker – art direction, design
- Stephen Weintraub – executive producer
- Pam Werheimer – coordination
- Todd Wolfe – dobro, electric guitar

== Charts ==
=== Weekly charts ===
Chart (1996–1997)	Peak position
Australian Albums (ARIA)	14
Austrian Albums (Ö3 Austria)	8
Belgian Albums (Ultratop Flanders)	10
Belgian Albums (Ultratop Wallonia)	15
Canadian Albums (Billboard)	12
Dutch Albums (Album Top 100)	23
Finnish Albums (Suomen virallinen lista)	27
French Albums (SNEP)	38
German Albums (Offizielle Top 100)	17
Japanese Albums (Oricon)	24
New Zealand Albums (RMNZ)	6
Norwegian Albums (VG-lista)	20
Scottish Albums (Official Charts)	2
Swedish Albums (Sverigetopplistan)	8
Swiss Albums (Schweizer Hitparade)	3
UK Albums (Official Charts)	5
US Billboard 200	6
European Albums (Eurotipsheet)	6

=== Year-end charts ===
Chart (1996)	Position
Swiss Albums (Schweizer Hitparade)	52
UK Albums (OCC)	28
US Billboard 200	152

Chart (1997)	Position
UK Albums (OCC)	15
US Billboard 200	34

== Certifications ==
Region	Certification	Certified units/sales
Australia (ARIA)	2× Platinum	140,000^{‡}
Canada (Music Canada)	3× Platinum	300,000^{^}
Japan (RIAJ)	Platinum	200,000^{^}
New Zealand (RMNZ)	Gold	7,500^{^}
Switzerland (IFPI Switzerland)	Gold	25,000^{^}
United Kingdom (BPI)	3× Platinum	900,000^{^}
United States (RIAA)	3× Platinum	3,000,000^{^}
Summaries
Europe (IFPI)	Platinum	1,000,000^{*}
^{*} Sales figures based on certification alone.^{^} Shipments figures based on certification alone.^{‡} Sales+streaming figures based on certification alone.
