= Mystic Fire =

Studio album by Mountain
- Released: July 30, 2002
- Studio: Nantucket Sound Studios, Nantucket, MA; Showplace Studios, Dover, NJ
- Genre: Blues rock, hard rock
- Length: 45:12
- Label: Lightyear Entertainment
- Producer: The Insulin Brothers, Ben Elliott

Mountain chronology
| Man's World (1996) | Mystic Fire (2002) | Masters of War (2007) |

Mystic Fire is the seventh studio album by American hard rock band Mountain, released on July 30, 2002. It is their final album of original material, as their following album, Masters of War, would consist solely of covers. In Europe, the album was released as Mountain High.

The financing for the album came from Europe, and the album was written and recorded to help the band promotionally in that region. The band toured Europe and the United States to promote the album.

== Content ==
The album includes the song "Immortal", which was co-written with and originally performed by Clutch. "Immortal" was originally released with different lyrics, and a different arrangement, as the song "Baby I'm Down" on Mountain (1969), Leslie West's first solo album. Clutch covered the song on their 2001 album Pure Rock Fury, rearranging it and changing the lyrics; their version has a guitar solo by Leslie West. Mountain then covered that version of the song on this album. "Fever" is a blues standard written by Eddie Cooley and Otis Blackwell. Corky Laing also has drum solos on "Marble Peach/Rotten Peach" and "Johnny Comes Marching Home." He's also responsible for the string arrangements on "Nantucket Sleighride."

== Reception ==
Professional ratings
Review scores
| Source | Rating |
|---|---|
| AllMusic | 2.5/5 stars |

AllMusic questioned the legitimacy of crediting the album to Mountain, arguing that ever since the death of Felix Pappalardi, compounded by the absence of Steve Knight, Mountain had been no more than a Leslie West solo project under a more marketable name, albeit with significant contributions from Corky Laing. They further criticized that "The songs are often rudimentary compositions that serve as excuses for the guitar excursions; they lack the poetic lyrics formerly contributed by [Gail] Collins and Pete Brown."

== Track listing ==
| No. | Title | Writer(s) | Length |
|---|---|---|---|
| 1. | "Immortal" | Leslie West, Neil Fallon | 3:59 |
| 2. | "Mystic Fire" | Corky Laing, Leslie West | 4:44 |
| 3. | "Fever" | Eddie Cooley, John Davenport | 3:22 |
| 4. | "The Sea" | George Citron, Leslie West | 5:19 |
| 5. | "Mutant X" | Corky Laing, Leslie West | 5:17 |
| 6. | "Better Off with the Blues" | Delbert McClinton, Gary Nicholson | 4:15 |
| 7. | "Mountain Express (Oh Boy)" | Leslie West | 2:56 |
| 8. | "Marble Peach / Rotten Peach" | Corky Laing, Leslie West | 5:01 |
| 9. | "Johnny Comes Marching Home" | Traditional | 2:50 |
| 10. | "Nantucket Sleighride (Redux)" | Felix Pappalardi, Gail Collins | 7:29 |
| Total length: | | | 45:12 |

== Personnel ==
- Leslie West – guitar, vocals, arranger, producer; bass on "Immortal"
- Corky Laing – drums, percussion; string arrangement and conduction on "Nantucket Sleighride (Redux)"

with:

- Chuck Hearne – bass
- Richie Scarlet – bass on "Nantucket Sleighride (Redux)"
- Todd Wolfe – slide guitar on "Fever"

Additional personnel

- Arnie Holland – executive producer
- Lisa Walker – art direction
