= Go for Your Life =

Go for Your Life may refer to:

- Go for Your Life (album), a 1985 album by Mountain
- Go for Your Life (fitness program), a program set up by the Victorian Government
