= Man's World (album) =

Studio album by Mountain
- Released: April 2, 1996
- Genre: Blues rock, hard rock
- Length: 40:49
- Label: Viceroy Music
- Producer: Eddie Black with Mountain

Mountain chronology
| Go for Your Life (1985) | Man's World (1996) | Mystic Fire (2002) |

Singles from Man's World
- 1. "In Your Face" Released: 1996

Man's World is the sixth studio album by American hard rock band Mountain. It was released on April 2, 1996. It was their first album in over 10 years.

The album features a cover of the James Brown song "It's a Man's Man's Man's World", from which it takes its title. The album also features former Uriah Heep and Colosseum bassist Mark Clarke, and musician Eddie Black, the latter of which sings lead vocals on "I Look".

== Track listing ==
| No. | Title | Length |
|---|---|---|
| 1. | "In Your Face" | 4:19 |
| 2. | "Thunder" | 3:50 |
| 3. | "Man's World" | 3:56 |
| 4. | "So Fine" | 3:02 |
| 5. | "Hotel Happiness" | 5:20 |
| 6. | "I'm Sorry" | 3:30 |
| 7. | "I Look (Power Mix)" | 3:36 |
| 8. | "Is That Okay?" | 3:46 |
| 9. | "Crest Of A Slump" | 3:30 |
| 10. | "You'll Never Be Alone" | 2:07 |
| 11. | "I Look (Hit Mix)" (Bonus Track) | 3:30 |
| Total length: | | 40:49 |

== Personnel ==
- Leslie West – guitar, vocals
- Mark Clarke – bass, vocals
- Corky Laing – drums, vocals

with:

- Eddie Black – guitar, background vocals; lead vocals on "I Look"

Additional personnel

- Jim Lewis – executive producer
- Paul Orofino – engineer
- Jean Paul – mastering
- Stephen Jacaruso – art direction
- Ioannis Jacaruso – art direction
