= Twin Peaks (album) =

Live album by Mountain
- Released: February 1974
- Recorded: August 30, 1973
- Venue: Koseinenkin Hall, Osaka, Japan
- Genre: Hard rock; blues rock
- Length: 68:43
- Label: Columbia; Windfall
- Producer: Felix Pappalardi

Mountain chronology
The Best of Mountain (1973)	Twin Peaks (1974)	Avalanche (1974)

Twin Peaks is the third live album by American hard rock band Mountain, released in February 1974 by Columbia and Windfall Records. It contains recordings from the band's performance at Koseinenkin Hall in Osaka, Japan on August 30, 1973. The album was produced by the band's bassist and second vocalist Felix Pappalardi, while the artwork was created by his wife and collaborator Gail Collins. It was Mountain's first release since returning after a year-long hiatus.

After breaking up for a year in the summer of 1972, Mountain returned with new members Bob Mann (guitar, keyboards) and Allan Schwartzberg (drums) joining Leslie West and Felix Pappalardi. The material for Twin Peaks was recorded on the subsequent Japanese tour, after which the new members left and original drummer Corky Laing returned. The album charted at number 142 on the US Billboard 200, which was the lowest position achieved by the band up to that point.

== Background ==
Mountain broke up in the summer of 1972, shortly after releasing its first live album Live: The Road Goes Ever On earlier in the year. Within a year the band had reunited, with original members Leslie West (guitar, vocals) and Felix Pappalardi (bass, vocals) joined by new members Bob Mann (guitar, keyboards) and Allan Schwartzberg (drums). The resulting Japanese tour – specifically, the August 30 performance at Koseinenkin Hall in Osaka – spawned the recordings for Twin Peaks, the group's second consecutive live album. The album is the only Mountain release to feature Mann and Schwartzberg, both of whom left shortly after the tour.

Twin Peaks was released in February 1974. It was issued as the band's first album with Columbia Records, in tandem with its regular label Windfall Records. By the time the album was released, original drummer Corky Laing had returned to Mountain, alongside new second guitarist David Perry.

== Reception ==
Professional ratings
Review scores
Source	Rating
AllMusic	2/5 stars

Upon its release, Twin Peaks debuted at number 166 on the US Billboard 200 albums chart in the week of March 9, 1974. The album spent a total of eight weeks on the chart, peaking at number 142 in the week of March 30, 1974. This marked the lowest peak position of any Mountain release to that date, and remains the second lowest ahead of only Go for Your Life at number 166. Twin Peaks also peaked at number 138 on the US Cash Box magazine albums chart.

Reviewing the album for the website AllMusic, James Chrispell offered a mixed opinion of Twin Peaks. Awarding it two out of five stars – the same rating he gave to Live: The Road Goes Ever On – the writer claimed that "The content [on the album] ends up showing off the best and the worst attributes of Mountain", the latter of which he singled out as being the 32-minute rendition of "Nantucket Sleighride" (although he admitted that "it's difficult not to be impressed with the playing" on the track).

== Track listing ==
No.	Title	Writer(s)	Original album	Length
1.	"Never in My Life"	Leslie West; Felix Pappalardi; Gail Collins; Corky Laing	Climbing! (1970)	4:16
2.	"Theme for an Imaginary Western" (Jack Bruce cover)	Bruce; Pete Brown	Climbing! (1970)	5:01
3.	"Blood of the Sun"	West; Pappalardi; Collins	Mountain (1969)	3:04
4.	"Guitar Solo"	West		5:41
5.	"Nantucket Sleighride"	Pappalardi; Collins	Nantucket Sleighride (1971)	31:49
6.	"Crossroader"	Pappalardi; Collins	Flowers of Evil (1971)	5:56
7.	"Mississippi Queen"	West; Laing; Pappalardi; David Rea	Climbing! (1970)	4:17
8.	"Silver Paper"	West; Pappalardi; Collins; George Gardos; Steve Knight; Laing	Climbing! (1970)	6:15
9.	"Roll Over Beethoven" (Chuck Berry cover)	Berry	single	2:24
Total length:				68:43

- On all vinyl and some CD pressings of the album, "Nantucket Sleighride" is split into two separate tracks.
- On the CBS Europe 2-LP release, the two parts of "Nantucket Sleighride" are the last tracks.

== Personnel ==
- Leslie West – guitar, vocals
- Felix Pappalardi – bass, vocals, production
- Bob Mann – guitar, keyboards
- Allan Schwartzberg – drums

Additional personnel

- Keiichi Nishiki – production director
- Tomoo Suzuki – engineering
- Gail Collins – artwork
- Hirohisa Ohkawa – photography

== Chart positions ==
Chart (1974)	Peak position
US Billboard 200	142
