= Live at the Blue Note =

Live at the Blue Note is the name of several jazz albums, including:

- Live at the Blue Note (Franco Ambrosetti album)
- Live at the Blue Note (Michel Camilo album)
- Live at the Blue Note (Chick Corea album)
- Live at the Blue Note (Duke Ellington album)
- Live at the Blue Note (Oscar Peterson album)
- Live at the Blue Note (Paquito D'Rivera Quintet album)
- Live at the Blue Note (Dave Valentin album)
- Live at the Blue Note, by Stéphane Grappelli
- Live at the Blue Note, by Irvin Mayfield
- Live at the Blue Note, by Arturo Sandoval

== See also ==
- Blue Note Jazz Club
