= Live: The Road Goes Ever On =

Live album by Mountain
- Released: April 24, 1972
- Recorded: August 16, 1969; December 14, 1971; January 29, 1972
- Venues: Woodstock Festival, Bethel, New York; Academy of Music, New York City; Rainbow Theatre, London
- Genre: Hard rock
- Length: 34:28
- Label: Windfall
- Producer: Felix Pappalardi

Mountain chronology
| Flowers of Evil (1971) | Live: The Road Goes Ever On (1972) | The Best of Mountain (1973) |

Singles from Live: The Road Goes Ever On
- 1. "Waiting to Take You Away" Released: July 1972

Live: The Road Goes Ever On is the first live album by American hard rock band Mountain, released on 24 April 1972 by Windfall Records. It contains four songs recorded at three shows in August 1969, December 1971, and January 1972. The album was produced by the band's bassist and second vocalist Felix Pappalardi, while the artwork was created by his wife and collaborator Gail Collins. The Road Goes Ever On takes its name from J. R. R. Tolkien's 1937 novel The Hobbit.

Following Mountain's breakup in early 1972, Windfall compiled a number of recordings from various shows to issue as the band's first live release. Mountain Live: The Road Goes Ever On was a minor commercial success, reaching number 63 on the US Billboard 200 and number 21 on the UK Albums Chart (the latter of which was the highest position the band achieved on the chart). The album spawned one single, "Waiting to Take You Away", which was released in July 1972.

== Background ==
After the completion of a European tour in February 1972, Mountain went on hiatus. Guitarist and vocalist Leslie West and drummer Corky Laing continued working together in the new band West, Bruce and Laing, which also featured former Cream member Jack Bruce, while bassist and vocalist Felix Pappalardi returned to focusing on production work. By the summer, the band had officially broken up after Pappalardi began to suffer hearing loss due to years of touring and studio work (which eventually led to his retirement). The group would eventually reunite in 1973, releasing live album Twin Peaks and studio album Avalanche the following year.

The group's label Windfall Records compiled a number of recordings for a live release – "Long Red" and "Waiting to Take You Away" from the August 16, 1969, performance at Woodstock, "Nantucket Sleighride" from the December 14, 1971, show at the Academy of Music in New York City, and "Crossroader" from the January 29, 1972, appearance at the Rainbow Theatre in London. The album was released on April 24, 1972, by Windfall and Bell Records. "Waiting to Take You Away" was released as the only single from the album. Live: The Road Goes Ever On has been reissued since its initial release; on July 13, 2018, Iconoclassic Records released a copy of the album with a bonus live recording of T-Bone Walker's "Stormy Monday" from the Atlanta International Pop Festival in 1970.

The recordings from the Woodstock Festival were made just prior to Corky Laing joining Mountain. Mountain's drummer at the time was N. D. Smart who was uncredited on the album. Ironically, the drum-only opening bars of "Long Red" made it one of the most sampled in the history of hip hop music meaning he's been widely heard but virtually unrecognized for it.

== Reception ==
Professional ratings
Review scores
| Source | Rating |
|---|---|
| AllMusic | 2/5 stars |

Upon its release, Live: The Road Goes Ever On debuted at number 190 on the US Billboard 200 albums chart in the week of May 13, 1972. The album spent a total of 18 weeks on the chart, peaking at number 63 in the week of July 22, 1972. The release also registered on the UK Albums Chart, spending three weeks on the chart in July and peaking at number 23, the highest position achieved by the band in the UK. Aside from the Billboard chart, Live: The Road Goes Ever On also peaked at number 37 on the US Cash Box magazine albums chart and number 47 on the US Record World magazine albums chart, both in June 1972.

Live: The Road Goes Ever On received mixed reviews. Upon its release, Billboard magazine published a review outlining that "Mountain rocks on and on with seventeen minutes and thirty-eight seconds of a "Nantucket Sleighride" plus three others that will pull every emotion from you and turn into knockout enthusiasm previously undiscovered." The writer went on to praise drummer Corky Laing's "thrump-ing pace", guitarist Leslie West and bassist Felix Pappalardi's "superb guitar work", and keyboardist Steve Knight's "tantalizing organ". James Chrispell of the website AllMusic described The Road Goes Ever On as "a fair example of Mountain live," but criticized "Nantucket Sleighride" for "show[ing] signs of the excess that would plague the band for the rest of its career". Fellow AllMusic contributor Bruce Eder claimed that "Hardcore fans appreciated the record as an extension of [the band's] recordings, but many listeners and most critics found it lacking musical cohesion."

== Track listing ==
Side one
| No. | Title | Writer(s) | Length |
|---|---|---|---|
| 1. | "Long Red" | Leslie West; Felix Pappalardi; John Ventura; Norman Landsberg | 5:50 |
| 2. | "Waiting to Take You Away" | West | 4:40 |
| 3. | "Crossroader" | Pappalardi; Gail Collins | 6:20 |

Side two
| No. | Title | Writer(s) | Length |
|---|---|---|---|
| 1. | "Nantucket Sleighride" | Pappalardi; Collins | 17:38 |
| Total length: | | | 34:28 |

2018 reissue bonus track
| No. | Title | Writer(s) | Length |
|---|---|---|---|
| 5. | "Stormy Monday" | T-Bone Walker | 19:27 |
| Total length: | | | 53:55 |

== Personnel ==
- Leslie West – guitar, vocals
- Felix Pappalardi – bass, vocals, production
- Steve Knight – keyboards
- N. D. Smart – drums (tracks 1 and 2)
- Corky Laing – drums (tracks 3, 4. 5)

Additional personnel

- Bud Prager – executive producer
- Bob d'Orleans – engineer
- Beverly Weinstein – art direction
- Gail Collins – cover artwork, photography

== Charts ==
| Chart (1972) | Peak position |
|---|---|
| UK Albums (Official Charts) | 21 |
| US Billboard 200 | 63 |
