= Forty-Four =

Blues standard written by Roosevelt Sykes

"44 Blues"

Single by Roosevelt Sykes
- B-side: "Boot That Thing"
- Released: 1929
- Recorded: June 14, 1929
- Genre: Blues
- Length: 3:05
- Label: OKeh
- Songwriter: Roosevelt Sykes (single credit)

"Forty-Four" or "44 Blues" is a blues standard whose origins have been traced back to early 1920s Louisiana. However, it was Roosevelt Sykes, who provided the lyrics and first recorded it in 1929, that helped popularize the song. "Forty-Four," through numerous adaptations and recordings, remains in the blues lexicon eighty years later.

== Origins ==
"Four-Four" was developed from an earlier piano-based blues theme titled "The Forty-Fours". Little Brother Montgomery, who is usually credited with early performances of the song, described it as a "barrelhouse, honky-tonk blues" without any lyrics. He taught it to another blues pianist, Lee Green, who taught it to Roosevelt Sykes. Sykes explained:

He [Lee Green] was the first guy I ever heard play the "44" Blues. Several people had been playing it through the country of course—Little Brother Montgomery and several others, but nobody had ever recorded it and there was no words to it, no words or lyrics at all. So Lee Green, he took a lot of time out to teach me how to play it.

Sykes added lyrics to the tune and recorded it as "44 Blues" on June 14, 1929, for Okeh Records. According to blues historian Paul Oliver, Sykes' lyrics "played on the differing interpretations of the phrase 'forty-fours'—the train number 44, the .44 caliber revolver and the 'little cabin' on which was the number 44, presumably a prison cell".

After Sykes recording, Green and Montgomery recorded their versions of "The Forty-Fours". While instrumentally both were similar to Sykes' version, the subject matter and lyrics were different. Green recorded his version, titled "Number 44 Blues," two months after Sykes and about one year later, Montgomery recorded his version titled "Vicksburg Blues". Sykes' version was the most popular and "was to be far more influential than Green's version". Oliver believes that Sykes lyrics, with their "overlays of meaning" accounted for the popularity of his song among singers. Many versions of "Forty-Four" appeared over the following years, including some that bore little resemblance to the original except for the title. Sykes, Green, and Montgomery recorded it themselves ten times between 1929 and 1936.

== Howlin' Wolf version ==
"Forty Four"

Single by Howlin' Wolf
- B-side: "I'll Be Around"
- Released: 1954
- Recorded: 1954
- Genre: Blues
- Length: 2:48
- Label: Chess
- Songwriter: Chester Burnett a.k.a. Howlin' Wolf (single credit)
- Producers: Leonard Chess, Phil Chess, Willie Dixon

In October 1954, Howlin' Wolf recorded his version, titled simply "Forty Four", as an electric Chicago blues ensemble piece. Unlike the early versions of the song, Wolf's recording featured prominent guitar lines and an insistent "martial shuffle on the snare drum plus a bass drum that slammed down like an industrial punch-press", according to biographers. Wolf retained Sykes' handgun reference and added "Well I'm so mad this morning, I don't know where in the world to go". With Howlin' Wolf's gruff and overpowering vocal style, the overall effect was menacing.

Backing Wolf, who sang and played harmonica, were Hubert Sumlin and Jody Williams on electric guitars, Otis Spann on piano, Willie Dixon on bass, and Earl Phillips on drums. Chess Records issued the song, with "I'll Be Around" as the B-side, on both 78 and 45 rpm record singles in 1954. It is included on Howlin' Wolf's first compilation album, Moanin' in the Moonlight (1959), as well as several other anthologies, such as Howlin' Wolf: The Chess Box (1991) and His Best (1997).

== Legacy ==
"Forty-Four" is identified as a blues standard by blues historian Gerard Herzhaft, who calls it "a necessary piece for all followers of the '88' (piano)". The song has been recorded by numerous musicians in a variety of styles; in reviews, it is often described as a Howlin' Wolf song.

Under its original title of "Vicksburg Blues" as recorded by Little Brother Montgomery in 1930, the track was inducted into the Blues Hall of Fame in 2026, in the 'Singles/album tracks' category.

== Sources ==
- Fancourt, Les; Morris, Chris; Shurman, Dick (1991). Howlin' Wolf: The Chess Box (Box set booklet). Howlin' Wolf. Universal City, California: MCA Records/Chess Records. CHD3-9332.
- Hall, Bob (2006). "Vicksburg Blues". In Komara, Edward (ed.). Encyclopedia of the Blues. New York City: Routledge. ISBN 978-0-415-92699-7.
- Herzhaft, Gerard (1992). "Forty Four Blues". Encyclopedia of the Blues. Fayetteville, Arkansas: University of Arkansas Press. ISBN 1-55728-252-8.
- Oliver, Paul (1968). Screening the Blues: Aspects of the Blues Tradition. New York City: Da Capo Press. ISBN 978-0306803444.
- Segrest, James; Hoffman, Mark (2004). Moanin' at Midnight: The Life and Times of Howlin' Wolf. New York City: Pantheon Books. ISBN 0-375-42246-3.
