= Jody Williams (blues musician) =

American blues guitarist and singer (1935–2018)

- Also known as: Little Papa Joe, Little Joe Lee
- Born: Joseph Leon Williams; February 3, 1935; Mobile, Alabama, U.S.
- Died: December 1, 2018 (aged 83) Munster, Indiana
- Genres: Blues
- Occupation: Musician
- Instrument(s): Electric guitar, vocals
- Years active: 1954–1960s, 2000–2014
- Labels: Blue Lake, Argo, Nike, Jive, Smash, Yulando, Evidence

Joseph Leon "Jody" Williams (February 3, 1935 – December 1, 2018) was an American blues guitarist and singer. His singular guitar playing, marked by flamboyant string-bending, imaginative chord voicings and a distinctive tone, was influential in the Chicago blues scene of the 1950s.

In the mid-1950s, Williams was one of the most sought-after session guitarists in Chicago, but he was little known outside the music industry, since his name rarely appeared on discs. His acclaimed comeback in 2000 led to a resurgence of interest in his early work and a reappraisal as one of the great blues guitarists. Williams was known for his imaginative chord selection, characterized by raised fives, and minor sixths and minor sevenths with flattened fives. He usually played with an unusual open E tuning, originally taught to him by Bo Diddley. In 2013, Williams was inducted to the Blues Hall of Fame.

== Early life ==
Born in Mobile, Alabama, Williams moved to Chicago at the age of five. His first instrument was the harmonica, which he swapped for the guitar after hearing Bo Diddley play at a talent show where they were both performing. Diddley, seven years his senior, took Williams under his wing and taught him the rudiments of guitar.

== Career ==
=== Chicago heyday ===
By 1951, Williams and Diddley were playing on the street together, with Williams providing backing to Diddley's vocals, accompanied by Roosevelt Jackson on washtub bass. Williams cut his teeth gigging with a string of blues musicians, notably Memphis Minnie, Elmore James, and Otis Spann. After touring with the West Coast blues piano player Charles Brown, Williams established himself as a session player with Chess Records.

At Chess, Williams met Howlin' Wolf, recently arrived in Chicago from Memphis, Tennessee, and was hired by Wolf as the first guitarist in his new Chicago-based band. A year later Hubert Sumlin moved to Chicago to join Wolf's band, and the dual guitars of Williams and Sumlin are featured on Howlin' Wolf's 1954 singles "Evil Is Going On" and "Forty Four" and the 1955 releases "Who Will Be Next" and "Come to Me Baby." Williams also provided backing on Otis Spann's 1954 release, "It Must Have Been the Devil", which features lead guitar work from B. B. King, one of Williams' early heroes and a big influence on his playing.

Williams's solo career began in December 1955 with the upbeat, saxophone-driven "Lookin' for My Baby", released under the name Little Papa Joe by Blue Lake Records. The record company closed a few months later, leaving his slide guitar performance on "Groan My Blues Away" unreleased. By this time, Williams was highly sought after as a session guitarist, and his virtuosity in this capacity is well illustrated by his blistering lead guitar work on Bo Diddley's "Who Do You Love?", a hit for Checker Records in 1956. (The rock musician Marshall Crenshaw listed Williams's guitar solo on "Who Do You Love" as one of the greatest guitar solos ever recorded). Other noteworthy session work from the 1950s include lead guitar parts on Billy Boy Arnold's "I Ain't Got You" and "I Wish You Would", Jimmy Rogers's "One Kiss", Jimmy Witherspoon's "Ain't Nobody's Business", and Otis Rush's "Three Times a Fool".

In 1957, Williams released "You May" on Argo Records, with the inventive B-side instrumental "Lucky Lou", the extraordinary opening riff of which Otis Rush copied on his 1958 Cobra Records side "All Your Love (I Miss Loving)". Further evidence of Williams's influence on Rush (they played on a number of sessions together) is Rush's solo on Buddy Guy's 1958 debut, "Sit and Cry (The Blues)", copied almost exactly from Williams's "You May".

=== Disillusionment with music business ===
The frequency with which Williams found his distinctive guitar phrases being copied without credit led to increasing disenchantment with the music business. When the distinctive riff he created for Billy Stewart's 1956 Argo release "Billy's Blues" was appropriated by Mickey Baker for the Mickey & Sylvia hit "Love Is Strange", Chess Records took legal action. At the conclusion of the case in 1961, Williams gained neither credit nor compensation. "I was ripped off," he later told John Sinkevics in the Grand Rapids Press. In the early 1960s, Williams was making a living gigging with his Big 3 Trio (not to be confused with Willie Dixon's group of the same name), but by the end of the decade, he had retired from the music industry altogether. He studied electronics and eventually became a technical engineer for Xerox, his job for over 25 years.

=== Comeback ===
Only after his retirement did Williams consider picking up his guitar again, which had lain untouched under his bed all the while. "One day my wife said if I started playing again I might feel better about life in general," he told the Chicago Sun-Times. In March 2000, he went to a performance by his old friend Robert Lockwood Jr., and grew nostalgic for his music days. Back at home, an old tape of himself playing moved him to tears and inspired him to pick up his guitar again. He returned to playing in public in June 2000, when he was featured at a club gig during the 2000 Chicago Blues Festival. He was encouraged in this period by Dick Shurman, who eventually produced his comeback album, Return of a Legend (2002), on which his bold playing belies his 30-year break from music. "He plays with a verve and vigor that sound as good today as it did on the classic records," wrote Vintage Guitar magazine.

Williams continued to perform around the world until 2014, mainly at large blues festivals, and often sitting in with the blues guitarist Billy Flynn at Chicago club appearances. Poor health later curtailed his musical activities.

== Death ==
William's final days were in a nursing home in Indiana, where he died from cancer on December 1, 2018.

== Discography ==
=== Singles ===
- 1956 – "Looking For My Baby" / "Easy Lovin'" (Blue Lake 116) (as Little Papa Joe)
- 1957 – "You May" / "Lucky Lou" (i) (Argo 5274) (as Little Joe Lee)
- 1962 – "Lonely Without You" / "Moanin' For Molasses" (i) (Nike 1013)
- 1963 – "Hideout" (i) / "Moanin' For Molasses" (i) (Smash S-1801)
- 1963 – "Time For A Change" / "Lonely Without You" (Jive J-1004)
- 1964 – "Time For A Change" / "Lonely Without You" (Yulando R-133-8665)

=== Albums ===
- 2002 – Return of a Legend (Evidence ECD 26120)
- 2004 – You Left Me In the Dark (Evidence ECD 26130)
- 2018 – In Session: Diary of a Chicago Bluesman 1954–1962 (Jasmine JASMCD 3100)

=== Appearances as guitarist ===
- 1954 – Howlin' Wolf, "Evil Is Going On" / "Baby How Long" (Chess 1575)
- 1954 – Howlin' Wolf, "Forty Four" / "I'll Be Around" (Chess 1584)
- 1954 – Otis Spann, "It Must Have Been The Devil" / "Five Spot" (Checker 807)
- 1955 – Howlin' Wolf, "Who Will Be Next" / "I Have A Little Girl" (Chess 1593)
- 1955 – Howlin' Wolf, "Come To Me Baby" / "Don't Mess With My Baby" (Chess 1607)
- 1955 – Sonny Boy Williamson II, "Don't Start Me Talkin'" / "All My Love In Vain" (Checker 824)
- 1955 – Billy Boy Arnold, "I Was Fooled" / "I Wish You Would" (Vee-Jay VJ 146)
- 1955 – Earl Phillips, "Oop De Oop" / "Nothing But Love" (Vee-Jay VJ 158)
- 1955 – Bo Diddley, "Diddy Wah Diddy" / "I'm Looking For A Woman" (Checker 832)
- 1956 – Billy Boy Arnold, "Don't Stay Out All Night" / "I Ain't Got You" (Vee-Jay VJ 171)
- 1956 – Lu Mac, "Albert Is His Name" / "I'll Never Let Him Know" (Blue Lake 117)
- 1956 – Bo Diddley, "Who Do You Love?" / "I'm Bad" (Checker 842)
- 1956 – Floyd Dixon, "Alarm Clock Blues" / "I'm Ashamed Of Myself" (Checker 857)
- 1956 – Bobby Charles, "Why Did You Leave" / "Don't You Know I Love You" (Chess 1617)
- 1956 – Billy Stewart, "Billy's Blues (Part 1)" / "Billy's Blues (Part 2)" (Chess 1625; Argo 5256)
- 1956 – Billy Boy Arnold, "Here's My Picture" / "You Got Me Wrong" (Vee-Jay VJ 192)
- 1956 – Buddy Morrow, "Rib Joint" / "Rosie's Room" (Mercury 71024)
- 1957 – Jimmy Rogers, "One Kiss" / "I Can't Believe" (Chess 1659)
- 1957 – Otis Rush, "Groaning The Blues" / "If You Were Mine" (Cobra 5010)
- 1957 – Harold Burrage, "Messed Up" / "I Don't Care Who Knows" (Cobra 5012)
- 1958 – Howlin' Wolf, "I Didn't Know" / "Moanin' For My Baby" (Chess 1695)
- 1958 – Otis Rush, "Three Times A Fool" / "She's A Good 'Un" (Cobra 5023)
- 1959 – Bo Diddley, "Dancing Girl" (on Have Guitar Will Travel: Checker LP 2974)
- 1960 – Bobby Davis, "I Was Wrong" / "Hype You Into Sellin' (Your Head)" (Bandera 2505)
- 1961 – Bobby Davis and the Big '3' Trio, "One Love Have I" / "She's A Problem" (Bandera 2508)
- 1964 – Billy Boy Arnold, "I Wish You Would" / "Prisoner's Plea" (Vivid 109) reissues
- 2007 – The Mannish Boys, "Groan My Blues Away", "Young & Tender" (on Big Plans: Delta Groove DGPCD 116)

=== Tracks issued later than their recording date ===
- 1967 – Howlin' Wolf, More Real Folk Blues (Chess; recorded 1953–1956 [rel. 1967])
- 1976 – J. T. Brown, "Lonely (As a Man Can Be)", "Going Home to My Baby", "It's a Shame to Tell the People", "When I Was a Lad", "Use That Spot" (on Windy City Boogie: Pearl PL-9; recorded 1956)
- 1979 – Harold Burrage, "I Love My Baby" (on Rockin' Wild: P-Vine PLP-9021; recorded 1957)
- 1982 – Willie Dixon, "Firey Love" (on Blues Roots Series, Vol. 12: Chess LP 6.24802AG; recorded 1957)
- 1989 – Jody Williams, "Moaning Blues (Groan My Blues Away)", "What a Fool I've Been (I Feel So All Alone)" (on Cool Playing Blues: Relic LP 8025, CD 7016; recorded 12/55)
- 1990 – Jimmy Witherspoon, "Congratulations", "Ain't Nobody's Business" (on Spoon So Easy: Chess CH-93003; recorded 1956)
- 1991 – Jody Williams, "What Kind of Gal Is That (What Kind of Girl Is This)" (on The Blues Volume 6: 50's Rarities, Chess/MCA CHD-9330; recorded 1957)
- 1995 – Willie Dixon, "All the Time" (on The Original Wang Dang Doodle, Chess/MCA CHD-9353; recorded 1957)
- 1996 – Bobby Charles, "Watch It, Sprocket", "Hey Good Lookin'" (on Chess Masters: MCA/Victor MVCM-22078; recorded 1956)
