= Hard to Make a Stand =

1997 single by Sheryl Crow

Single by Sheryl Crow

from the album Sheryl Crow
- B-side: "In Need"; "Sad Sad World"
- Released: March 17, 1997
- Studio: Sunset Sound Factory (Los Angeles)
- Length: 3:07
- Label: A&M
- Songwriters: Sheryl Crow; Bill Bottrell; Todd Wolfe; R.S. Bryan
- Producer: Sheryl Crow

Sheryl Crow singles chronology
"Everyday Is a Winding Road" (1997)	"Hard to Make a Stand" (1997)	"A Change Would Do You Good" (1997)

Audio video
- "Hard To Make A Stand" on YouTube

"Hard to Make a Stand" is the third single from Sheryl Crow's self-titled second album (1996). It was released by A&M as a single only in Europe, Canada, Japan, and South Africa. The track caused controversy in the US due to its references to abortion. The music video for the song, directed by Matthew Amos, is taken from a live performance in London. A live performance of this song is featured on Sheryl Crow's 2006 concert DVD: Wildflower Tour, Live from New York.

== Critical reception ==
Kevin Courtney from Irish Times commented, "'Hard to Make a Stand' is another just bog standard country rock tune, but somehow Ms Crow manages to turn it into a sparkling, rhinestone encrusted pop hit. This one faithfully follows the path of its predecessor, 'Everyday Is a Winding Road', offering nothing new except another chance to see the 1990s Linda Ronstadt do her cowgirl routine on video."

== Track listings ==
- UK CD1
1. "Hard to Make a Stand"
2. "Hard to Make a Stand" (alternate version)
3. "Hard to Make a Stand" (live BBC Simon Mayo Session)
4. "In Need"
- UK CD2
1. "Hard to Make a Stand"
2. "Sad Sad World"
3. "No One Said It Would Be Easy" (live from Shepherd's Bush Empire in London)
4. "If It Makes You Happy" (live from Shepherd's Bush Empire in London)
- European CD single
1. "Hard to Make a Stand"
2. "Sad Sad World"
- Japanese CD single
1. "Hard to Make a Stand"
2. "If It Makes You Happy" (live)
3. "On the Outside" (live)
4. "No One Said It Would Be Easy" (live)

== Credits and personnel ==
Credits are adapted from the UK CD2 liner notes and the Sheryl Crow album booklet.

Studios

- Recorded at Sunset Sound Factory (Los Angeles)
- Mastered at Gateway Mastering (Portland, Maine, US)

Personnel

- Sheryl Crow – writing, vocals, bass guitar, acoustic guitar, Hammond organ, production
- Bill Bottrell – writing
- Todd Wolfe – writing
- R.S. Bryan – writing
- Steve Donnelly – electric guitar
- Pete Thomas – drums
- Tchad Blake – mixing, recording
- Bob Ludwig – mastering
- Jeri Heiden – artwork design
- Jim Wright – photography

== Charts ==
Chart (1997–1998)	Peak position
Canada Top Singles (RPM)	15
Canada Adult Contemporary (RPM)	32
Europe (Eurochart Hot 100)	85
Quebec (ADISQ)	10
Scottish Singles Sales (Official Charts)	14
UK Singles (Official Charts)	22

== Release history ==
Region	Date	Format(s)	Label(s)	Ref.
United Kingdom	March 17, 1997	CD; cassette	A&M	
Japan	May 8, 1997	CD	A&M	
