= Todd Wolfe =

American singer-songwriter

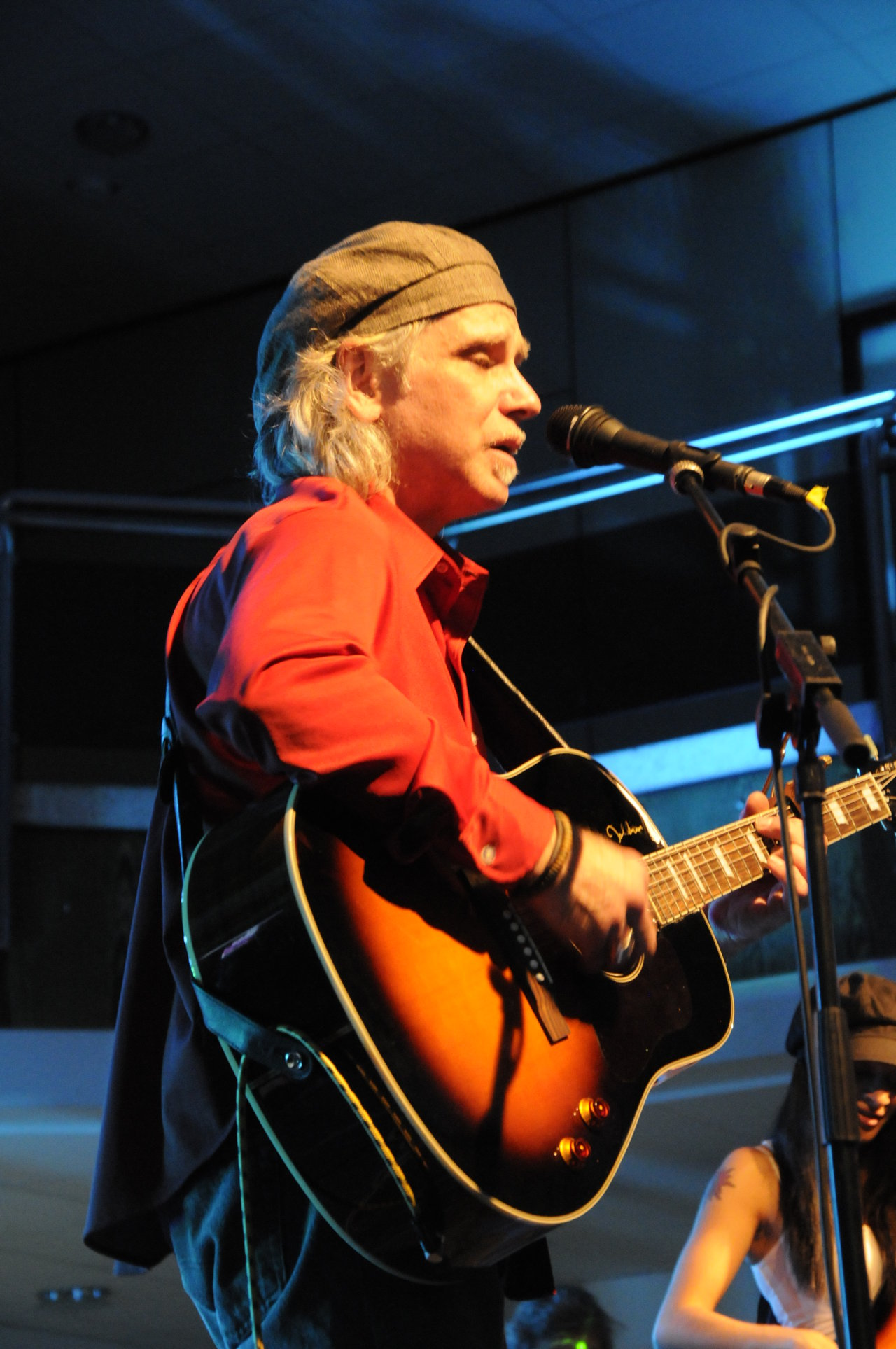
- Todd Wolfe live at the Airport-Event in Mönchengladbach, Germany on April 13, 2013

Background information
- Born: Todd Stewart Wolfe; January 22, 1957 (age 69); Queens, New York, United States
- Genres: Rock, blues, blues rock, psychedelic rock, Southern rock
- Occupations: Musician, bandleader, producer
- Instruments: Guitar, vocals
- Years active: 1979–present
- Labels: A & M, Valley Entertainment, Blues Leaf, Ulftone Music, Hypertension Music, Okra Tone
- Website: www.toddwolfe.com

Todd Stewart Wolfe (born January 22, 1957, in Queens, New York, United States) is an American blues rock guitarist and singer-songwriter.

His professional career has spanned for a period of six decades and had released nine albums with his own band in the blues and rock genre. He has also worked as the lead guitarist for Carla Olson from 1991 to 1993 and for Sheryl Crow from 1993 to 1998.

As a writer, Wolfe's songs have been covered by Faith Hill, Stevie Nicks, Deborah Coleman, Shannon Curfman, Deborah Coleman and others.

Since departing Sheryl Crow's band, Wolfe has focused on his career as a solo artist and guitarist touring North America and Europe extensively.

== Early life ==
Wolfe's father who was from New York City and his mother from Marshall, Texas, contributed to the development of his musical tastes. The different styles of music regularly heard in the Wolfe household encouraged Todd's love of music. Like many Americans of that era, the appearance of the Beatles on The Ed Sullivan Show accelerated Wolfe's growing appreciation for music. His appreciation deepened with the arrival in the United States of the British Invasion with bands such as The Animals, The Dave Clark Five, The Yardbirds and The Rolling Stones.

After the arrival of the second "British Invasion" and the play of Eric Clapton and the Cream, the Jimi Hendrix Experience, British guitarists such as Peter Green, Mick Taylor and Jeff Beck, and the emergence of American guitarists such as Johnny Winter, Mike Bloomfield, and Leslie West, Wolfe began to develop his own skills as a guitarist. At age thirteen, he purchased his first guitar, a Dakota red Fender Mustang. Wolfe's interests expanded to include the works of American blues guitarists such as B.B. King, Freddy King, Otis Rush, Hubert Sumlin, Buddy Guy, and Albert King. Wolfe found similar inspiration in the electric blues of Muddy Waters and Howlin' Wolf bands.

== Early career ==
In 1979, Wolfe began his career by playing in garage bands at local parties and participated in "battle of the bands" competitions. While still in high school, Wolfe put together his first band. Four years later, he formed his first club band, Nitetrain. The band opened for Albert Collins, Dickey Betts, and Walter "Wolfman" Washington.

Four years later, he formed his second club band, Troy & the Tornados. This band opened for many acts appearing in the metropolitan New York area which included Gregg Allman, The Outlaws, Dickey Betts, Johnny Winter, Robin Trower, The Neville Brothers and others.

During his time with Troy & the Tornados, Wolfe met two women: Carla Olson of the Textones and Sheryl Crow. At that time, Crow was working as an in-studio backup singer in Los Angeles. She was introduced to Wolfe by Stephen "Scooter" Weintraub, who would later manage both artists. Immediately Wolfe and Crow began collaborating in studio sessions in the hopes of earning a record deal.

Although the pair failed to earn a record contract, Wolfe used the opportunity to relocate permanently to Los Angeles, performing in "holes in the wall" throughout Southern California. During this time, Wolfe also began to score music for the Playboy Channel. In 1991, Wolfe began to work with Olson, whom he had met while still in New York. Wolfe accepted Olson's invitation to join her band as lead guitarist, a spot he held for the next two years.

In 1993, Crow offered Wolfe the lead guitar spot in the touring band she was forming to support her debut album, Tuesday Night Music Club. Based upon her earlier work with Wolfe, Crow thought that his dynamic stage presence would bring an additional measure of excitement to her live shows. During the next five years, Crow and her band would sojourn from "all in the van" tours of local establishments to a string of world tours in which they opened for performers such as Bob Dylan, The Rolling Stones, The Eagles, Plant & Page, and Elton John. In 1996, Wolfe co-wrote with Sheryl Crow "Hard to Make a Stand," which appeared on Crow's eponymously titled second album, Sheryl Crow.

In 1995, while a member of Crow's band, Wolfe created his own band which signed with A & M Records. The band, Mojoson, included Wolfe as the lead guitarist, Scott Bryan (a fellow member of Crow's band) as guitarist, keyboards and lead vocalist, bassist Eric Massimino and drummer Michael Lawrence, who also played for Sun 60. Over a three-year period, the band recorded two studio albums. However, A&M underwent a transition of ownership before the albums were released. Consequently, the label's "takeover" albums went unissued, Mojoson's contract was dissolved, and the band was disbanded.

In 1998, Wolfe left Sheryl Crow's band to focus on forming a new band. Wolfe and his band with various lineups from 1999 to 2015 recorded nine albums, the last lineup consisting of Roger Voss drums and vocals, Justine Gardner bass and vocals and John Ginty on Hammond organ for the recording of "Miles to Go" and "long Road Back" and as a trio with Roger & Justine, toured extensively in the USA, Canada, Europe and Japan.

== Present career ==
In August 2015, Wolfe released his ninth studio album titled Long Road Back. The Todd Wolfe Band is currently on hiatus after touring in 2016 and since that time Todd has recorded a duet album with Carla Olson, The Hidden Hills Sessions in 2019 followed by tour dates in the Northeast and Europe.

== Discography ==
Year	Title	Label
1999	Live from Manny's Car Wash	Blue Lizard Music
2002	Wolfe	Ulftone Music, Okra Tone Records
2004	Delaware Crossing	Ulftone Music, Valley Entertainment
2006	Why, Thank You Very Much	Ulftone Music, Valley Entertainment
2008	Borrowed Time	Blues Leaf Records
2009	Stripped Down at the Bang Palace	Blues Leaf Records
2011	Live	American Home Entertainment
2013	Miles To Go	American Showplace Music
2015	Long Road Back	American Showplace Music
2019	The Hidden Hills Sessions with Carla Olson	Red Parlor Records

== Additional credits ==
Year	Title	Artist	Credit
1993	Within an Ace	Carla Olson	Guitar
1994	Fast Track to Nowhere: Songs from "Rebel Highway"	Various Artists	Guitar
1994	Reap the Whirlwind	Carla Olson	Guitar
1995	Boys on the Side	Original Soundtrack	Composer, Guitar
1995	Wave of the Hand: The Best of Carla Olson	Carla Olson	Guitar
1996	Pompatus of Love	Original Soundtrack	Guitar
1996	Sheryl Crow	Sheryl Crow	Dobro, Guitar (Electric), Guitar
1996	Sheryl Crow [Japan]	Sheryl Crow	Dobro, composer, Guitar (Electric), Guitar
1997	Hard to Make a Stand	Sheryl Crow	Pedal Steel, Guitar, Guitar (Electric)
1997	Live on Letterman: Music from the Late Show	Various Artists	Pedal Steel
1998	Enchanted: The Works of Stevie Nicks	Stevie Nicks	Guitar
1998	Faith	Faith Hill	Guitar
1998	Love Will Always Win	Faith Hill	Composer
1998	Globe Sessions	Sheryl Crow	Soloist, Guitar (Electric)
1998	Globe Sessions [DVD]	Sheryl Crow	Guitar (Electric)
1998	Globe Sessions [SACD/Bonus Track]	Sheryl Crow	Guitar (Electric), Soloist
1999	Loud Guitars, Big Suspicions	Shannon Curfman	Composer
2001	Honest as Daylight: The Best of Carla Olson (1981–2000)	Carla Olson	Guitar
2001	Livin' on Love	Deborah Coleman	Composer
2001	Best of Sessions at West 54th, Vol. 1	Various Artists	Guitar
2002	2 Good 4 U	Michelle Penn	Slide Guitar
2002	Mystic Fire	Mountain	Slide Guitar
2003	Chas	Chas	Slide Guitar
2004	Chartbuster Karaoke: Faith Hill, Vol. 1	Karaoke	Composer
2004	Songs I Left Behind	Mike Tramp	Guitar
2007	Masters of War	Mountain	Guitar (Rhythm), Guitar
2007	Collection	Leslie West	Guitar (Rhythm), Guitar
2008	Step Up	Doña Oxford	Guitar, Soloist
2008	Dark Horses	Carla Olson	Guitar
2017	Rubies and Diamonds	Carla Olson	Guitar
2020	Have Harmony, Will Travel 2	Carla Olson	Guitar
2021	Americana Railroad	Various Artists	Guitar
2022	Ladies Sing Lightfoot	Various Artists	Guitar
2023	Have Harmony, Will Travel 3	Carla Olson	Guitar
