= Willie Johnson (guitarist) =

American electric blues guitarist (1923–1995)

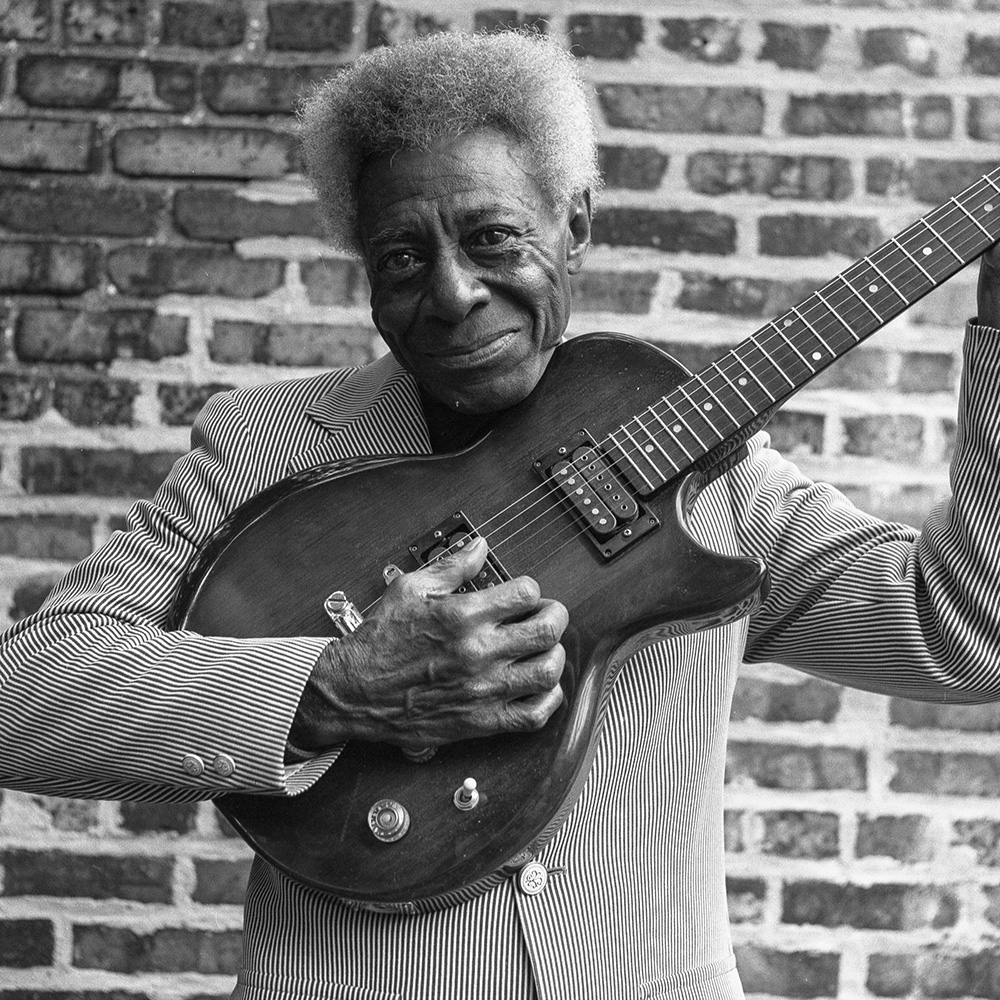

Background information
- Born: March 4, 1923; Senatobia, Mississippi, U.S.
- Died: February 26, 1995 (aged 71) Chicago, Illinois, U.S.
- Genres: Electric blues, Memphis blues
- Occupation: Guitarist
- Instrument: Electric guitar
- Years active: 1940s–1950s
- Label: Sun
- Formerly of: Howlin' Wolf

Willie Johnson (March 4, 1923 – February 26, 1995) was an American electric blues guitarist. He is best known as the principal guitarist in Howlin' Wolf's band from 1948 to 1953. His raucous, distorted guitar playing is prominent on Howlin' Wolf's Memphis recordings during 1951–1953, including the hit song "How Many More Years" (recorded May 1951).

In 2017, Johnson was posthumously inducted in to the Blues Hall of Fame.

== Life and career ==
Willie Lee Johnson was born in Senatobia, Mississippi. As the guitarist in the first band led by Howlin' Wolf, he appeared on most of Wolf's recordings between 1951 and 1953. He provided the slightly jazzy yet raucous guitar sound that was the signature of all of Wolf's Memphis recordings. Johnson also performed and recorded with other blues artists in the Memphis area, including pianist Willie Love, Willie Nix, Junior Parker, Roscoe Gordon, Bobby "Blue" Bland and others.

When Wolf moved to Chicago in around 1953, he could not convince Johnson to join him. Johnson stayed on in Memphis for several years, playing on a number of sessions for Sun Records, including a 1955 collaboration with vocalist Sammy Lewis, "I Feel So Worried", released under the name Sammy Lewis with Willie Johnson. By the time Johnson relocated to Chicago, Wolf had already hired guitarist Hubert Sumlin as a permanent replacement. James Cotton later recalled that Wolf replaced Johnson because of his heavy drinking.

Johnson occasionally performed and recorded with Howlin' Wolf after settling in Chicago, and also played briefly in the band of Muddy Waters, as well as a number of other local Chicago blues musicians, including J. T. Brown, in the late 1950s and early 1960s. He made his living mainly outside of music for the rest of his life, only occasionally sitting in with the bands of his old friends around Chicago. His final recordings were made for Earwig Music in Chicago in the early 1990s. Johnson died in Chicago on February 26, 1995.

== Namesakes ==
Willie Johnson the guitarist should not be confused with Willie Johnson (a member of the Golden Gate Jubilee Quartet until joining the Jubilaires in 1948), or with Blind Willie Johnson, an earlier gospel artist.
