= Hubert Sumlin =

American blues guitarist and singer (1931–2011)

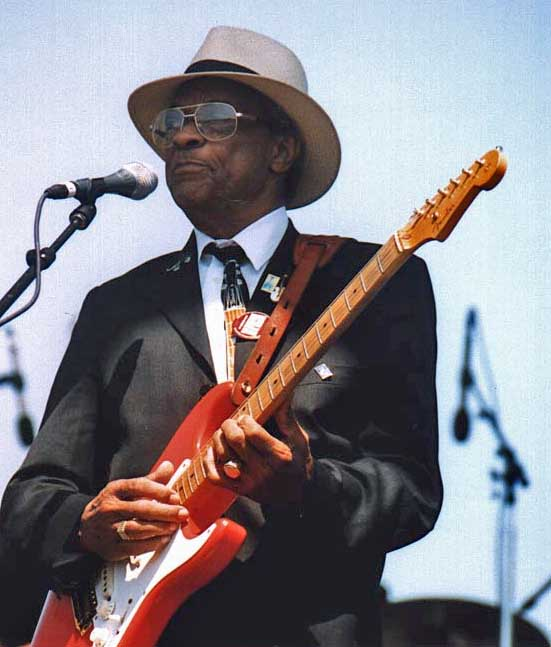
- Sumlin performing at the 2003 Long Beach Blues Festival

Background information
- Born: Hubert Charles Sumlin; November 16, 1931; Greenwood, Mississippi, U.S.
- Died: December 4, 2011 (aged 80) Wayne, New Jersey
- Genres: Chicago blues, electric blues
- Occupation: Musician
- Instruments: Guitar, vocals
- Years active: 1953–2011
- Website: www.hubertsumlinblues.com

Hubert Charles Sumlin (November 16, 1931 – December 4, 2011) was a Chicago blues guitarist and singer, best known for his "wrenched, shattering bursts of notes, sudden cliff-hanger silences and daring rhythmic suspensions" as a member of Howlin' Wolf's band. He was ranked number 43 in Rolling Stone's "100 Greatest Guitarists of All Time".

== Biography ==
Sumlin was born in Greenwood, Mississippi, and raised in Hughes, Arkansas. He got his first guitar when he was eight years old. As a boy, he met Howlin' Wolf by sneaking into a performance.

Wolf relocated from Memphis to Chicago in 1953, but his longtime guitarist Willie Johnson chose not to join him. In Chicago, Wolf hired the guitarist Jody Williams, but in 1954 he invited Sumlin to move to Chicago to play second guitar in his band. Williams left the band in 1955, leaving Sumlin as the primary guitarist, a position he held almost continuously (except for a brief spell playing with Muddy Waters around 1956) for the remainder of Wolf's career. According to Sumlin, Howlin' Wolf sent him to a classical guitar instructor at the Chicago Conservatory of Music to learn keyboards and scales. Sumlin played on the album Howlin' Wolf (called the "rocking chair album", with reference to its cover illustration), which was named the third greatest guitar album of all time by Mojo magazine in 2004.

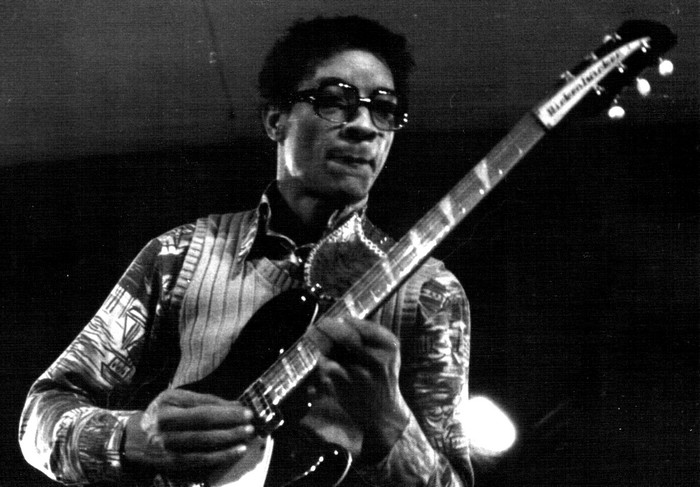
Sumlin performing in France, December 17, 1975, five days before recording My Guitar and Me

Upon Wolf's death in 1976, Sumlin continued playing with several other members of Wolf's band, as the Wolf Gang, until about 1980. He also recorded under his own name, beginning with a session from a tour of Europe with Wolf in 1964. His last solo album was About Them Shoes, released in 2004 by Tone-Cool Records. He underwent lung removal surgery the same year, but he continued performing until just before his death. His final recording, just days before his death, was tracks for an album by Stephen Dale Petit, Cracking The Code (333 Records).

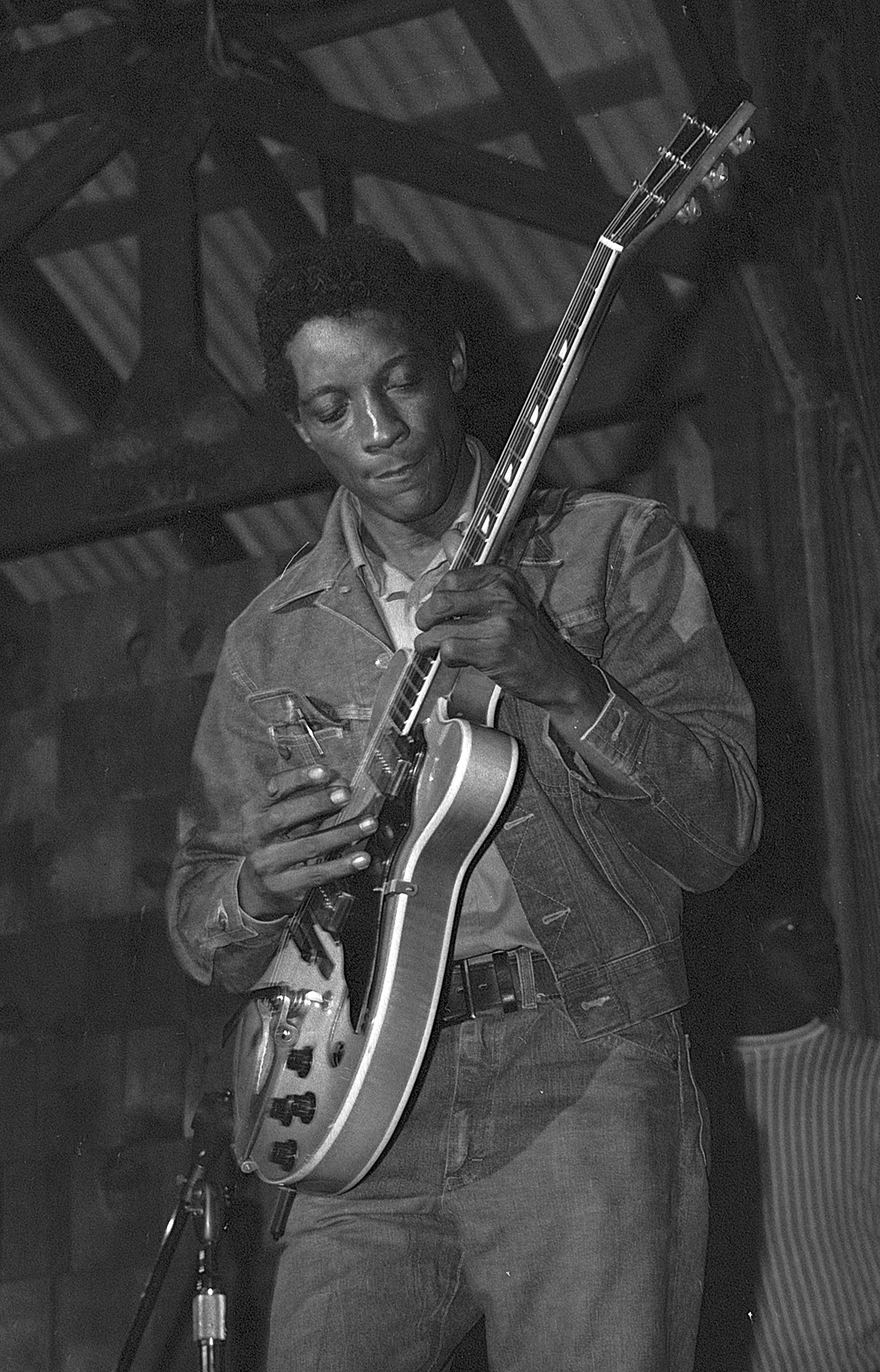
Hubert Sumlin at the 1970 Ann Arbor Blues Festival

Sumlin was inducted into the Blues Foundation Hall of Fame in 2008. He was nominated for four Grammy Awards: in 1999 for the album Tribute to Howlin' Wolf, with Henry Gray, Calvin Jones, Sam Lay, and Colin Linden; in 2000 for Legends, with Pinetop Perkins; in 2006, for his solo project About Them Shoes (which features performances by Keith Richards, Eric Clapton, Levon Helm, David Johansen and James Cotton) and in 2010 for his contribution to Kenny Wayne Shepherd's Live! in Chicago. He won multiple Blues Music Awards. He was a judge for the fifth annual Independent Music Awards, given to support the careers of independent artists.

Sumlin lived in Totowa, New Jersey for 10 years before his death. He died of heart failure on December 4, 2011, at the age of 80, in a hospital in Wayne, New Jersey. He was survived by his wife, son, and three daughters. Mick Jagger and Keith Richards paid Sumlin's funeral expenses.

== Partial discography ==
Albums
| Year | Title | Label | Number | Notes |
| 1964 | American Folk Blues | Amiga | 850 043 | Germany |
| 1969 | Hubert's "American" Blues! | Scout | Sc-4 | |
| 1974 | Kings of Chicago Blues, Vol. 2 | Disques Vogue | LDM 30175 | France, recorded 1971 |
| 1976 | Groove | Black & Blue | 33.511 | France, recorded 1975 |
| 1980 | Gamblin' Woman | L + R | 42.008 | Germany, recorded 1980 |
| 1987 | Hubert Sumlin's Blues Party | Black Top | BT-1036 | US |
| 1989 | Heart & Soul | Blind Pig | BP-3389 | US |
| 1990 | Healing Feeling | Black Top | BT-1053 | US |
| 1991 | Blues Guitar Boss | JSP | 239 | UK, recorded 1990 in London |
| 1994 | Made in Argentina 1993 | Blues Special | 9501 | Argentina, recorded 1993 in Buenos Aires with Emilio Villanueva and the Kansas City Boys |
| 1994 | I'm the Back Door Man | Blues Special | 9506 | Argentina, recorded 1993 in Buenos Aires |
| 1994 | My Guitar and Me | Evidence Music | ECD-26045 | Paris, recorded on Dec 22, 1975 at Barclay Studio |
| 1996 | Blues Classics | Bellaphon | 82007 | Germany, recorded 1964 in East Berlin |
| 1998 | I Know You | APO | 2004 | US |
| 1998 | Wake Up Call | Blues Planet | 1116 | US |
| 1999 | Pinetop Perkins & Hubert Sumlin: Legends | Telarc | 83446 | US |
| 2003 | Do the Don't | Intuition | 34252 | Germany; Elliott Sharp's Terraplane, with Hubert Sumlin |
| 2005 | About Them Shoes | Tone-Cool/Artemis Records | 51609 | US, also Rykodisc RCD 17307 in the UK |
| 2010 | Midnight Memphis Sun | NorthernBlues Music | NMB0058 | JW-Jones release with special guests Hubert Sumlin and Charlie Musselwhite |
| 2012 | Sky Road Songs | Yellowbird | 7724-2 | Germany; Elliott Sharp's Terraplane, with special guest Hubert Sumlin (recorded in 2011) |

Videos
| Year | Title | Label | Number | Notes |
| 2005 | The Blues Guitar of Hubert Sumlin | Homespun Tapes | SUMGT21 | US, VHS & DVD |
