= Live at Manchester Free Trade Hall '75 =

Live album by Jack Bruce
- Released: 20 May 2003
- Recorded: June 1975
- Venue: Manchester Free Trade Hall, Manchester
- Genre: Jazz rock, progressive rock, blues rock
- Length: 111:01
- Label: Polydor
- Producer: Mark Powell

Jack Bruce chronology
Shadows in the Air (2001)	Live at Manchester Free Trade Hall '75 (2003)	More Jack than God (2003)

Professional ratings
Review scores
Source	Rating
AllMusic	4/5 stars
Classic Rock	7/10 stars

Live at Manchester Free Trade Hall '75 is a live album by the Jack Bruce Band released in 2003. It was compiled from a rough mix of a recording of a performance at Manchester Free Trade Hall in June 1975, the only surviving remnant of an abandoned live album project. Bruce's bass guitar is not very prominent in the mix.

== Track listing ==
All songs by Pete Brown and Jack Bruce, except where indicated

=== Disc one ===
1. "Can You Follow?" – 1:45
2. "Morning Story" – 7:56
3. "Keep It Down" – 5:45
4. "Pieces of Mind" – 5:56
5. "Tickets to Waterfalls/Weird of Hermiston/Post War" – 25:08
6. "Spirit" (Tony Williams) – 10:44

=== Disc two ===
1. "One/You Burned the Tables on Me" – 17:01
2. "Smiles and Grins" – 24:39
3. "Sunshine of Your Love" (Brown, Bruce, Eric Clapton) – 12:07

== Personnel ==
Musicians

- Jack Bruce – vocals, bass guitar, piano
- Carla Bley – clavinet, Mellotron, organ, electric piano, synthesizer
- Bruce Gary – drums
- Ronnie Leahy – piano, electric piano, synthesizer
- Mick Taylor – guitar

Production

- Joe Black – project coordinator
- Paschal Byrne – digital editing, remastering
- Mark Powell – liner notes, producer, research
- Margrit Seyffer – reissue
- Phil Smee – CD package design
