= Cities of the Heart =

Live album by Jack Bruce
- Released: March 1994
- Recorded: live at E-Werk Cologne, Germany, 2 & 3 November 1993
- Genres: Rock, jazz rock, blues rock
- Length: 116:50
- Label: CMP Records
- Producers: Jack Bruce, with Kurt Renker & Walter Quintus

Jack Bruce chronology
| Somethin Els (1993) | Cities of the Heart (1994) | Monkjack (1995) |

Professional ratings
Review scores
| Source | Rating |
|---|---|
| Allmusic | 4/5 stars |
| Encyclopedia of Popular Music | 4/5 stars |

Cities of the Heart is a Jack Bruce double CD release of sections of two live performances given on 2 and 3 November 1993 in Cologne, Germany, to celebrate Bruce's 50th birthday. They were recorded for the WDR "Rockpalast" TV show and a DVD of the shows, entitled Rockpalast: The 50th Birthday Concerts, was released by MIG Music in 2014.

== Track listing ==
=== Disc one ===
1. "Can You Follow?" (Pete Brown, Jack Bruce) – 1:56
  Jack Bruce – vocals, piano
2. "Running Through Our Hands" (Brown, Bruce, Janet Godfrey) – 4:13
  Jack Bruce – vocals, piano
  Gary Husband – keyboards
3. "Over the Cliff" (Bruce, Jerry Goldsmith) – 3:46
4. "Statues" (Bruce) – 7:37
5. "First Time I Met the Blues" (Eurreal Montgomery) – 4:47
  Jack Bruce – bass; vocals (5)
  Dick Heckstall-Smith – saxophone
  Ginger Baker – drums
  Clem Clempson – guitar (5)
6. "Smiles & Grins" (Bruce, Brown) – 9:48
  Jack Bruce – vocals, bass, piano
  Clem Clempson – guitar
  Dick Heckstall-Smith – saxophone
  Art Themen – saxophone
  Bernie Worrell – Hammond organ
  Malcolm Bruce – synthesizer
  Gary Husband – drums
7. "Bird Alone" (Bruce, Brown) – 9:56
  Jack Bruce – vocals, bass
  Clem Clempson – guitar
  Bernie Worrell – Hammond organ, piano
  Gary Husband – drums
8. "Neighbor, Neighbor"(Alton, J.Valler) – 5:32
9. "Born Under a Bad Sign" (William Bell, Booker T. Jones) – 6:17
  Jack Bruce – vocals, bass
  Clem Clempson – guitar
  Dick Heckstall-Smith – saxophone
  Art Themen – saxophone
  Henry Lowther – trumpet
  John Mumford – trombone
  Bernie Worrell – Hammond organ
  Simon Phillips – drums
  Jonas Bruce – piano (9)

=== Disc two ===
1. "Ships in the Night" (Brown, Bruce) – 5:20
  Jack Bruce – vocals
  Maggy Reilly – vocals
  Clem Clempson – acoustic guitar, electric guitar
  Malcolm Bruce – acoustic guitar
  Bernie Worrell – Hammond organ
  Gary Husband – piano
  François Garny – bass
  Simon Phillips – drums
2. "Never Tell Your Mother She's Out of Tune" (Brown, Bruce) – 4:19
  Jack Bruce – vocals, piano
  Clem Clempson – guitar
  Dick Heckstall-Smith – saxophone
  Art Themen – saxophone
  Henry Lowther – trumpet
  John Mumford – trombone
  François Garny – bass
  Simon Phillips – drums
3. "Theme for an Imaginary Western" (Brown, Bruce) – 6:00
4. "Golden Days" (Bruce) – 5:38
  Jack Bruce – vocals, piano
  Clem Clempson – guitar
  Bernie Worrell – Hammond organ
  François Garny – bass
  Simon Phillips – drums
  Gary "Mudbone" Cooper – vocals (4)
5. "Life on Earth" (Bruce) – 5:21
  Jack Bruce – vocals, bass
  Gary Moore – guitar
  Simon Phillips – drums
6. "N.S.U." (Bruce) – 6:29
7. "Sitting on Top of the World" (Lonnie Chatmon, Walter Vinson) – 6:52
8. "Politician" (Brown, Bruce) – 5:39
9. "Spoonful" (Willie Dixon) – 9:13
  Jack Bruce – vocals, bass
  Gary Moore – guitar
  Ginger Baker – drums
  Pete Brown – vocals (8)
10. "Sunshine of Your Love" (Brown, Bruce, Eric Clapton) – 8:07
  Jack Bruce – vocals, piano
  Gary "Mudbone" Cooper – vocals
  Clem Clempson – guitar
  Malcolm Bruce – acoustic guitar
  Dick Heckstall-Smith – saxophone
  Art Themen – saxophone
  Henry Lowther – trumpet
  John Mumford – trombone
  Bernie Worrell – Hammond organ
  Jonas Bruce – synthesizer
  François Garny – bass
  Ginger Baker – drums
  Simon Phillips – drums
  Pete Brown – percussion

== Personnel ==
Musicians

- Pete Brown – vocals, percussion
- Jack Bruce – bass, piano, vocals
- Jonas Bruce – piano
- Malcolm Bruce – keyboards
- Dave "Clem" Clempson – guitar
- Gary "Mudbone" Cooper – vocals
- François Garny – bass
- Gary Husband – drums, keyboards, piano
- Henry Lowther – trumpet
- John Mumford – trombone
- Maggie Reilly – vocals
- Art Themen – saxophone
- Ginger Baker – drums
- Dick Heckstall-Smith – saxophone
- Gary Moore – guitar
- Simon Phillips – drums
- Bernie Worrell – piano

Production

- Cedric Beatly – recording
- David Calvin – recording
- Norbert Gutzman – assistant engineer
- Harald Glaser – live recording submixes
- Walter Quintus – mixing
- Ulf von Kanitz – art direction
- Guido Harari – b/w and colour photos
- Nanna Botsch – colour photos
- Ralph Weber – photo of the Bruce family
- Malcom Bruce – transcriptions
- Klaus Schruff – computer music notation
