= Rocket 88 (disambiguation) =

"Rocket 88" is a 1951 rhythm and blues song recorded by "Jackie Brenston and his Delta Cats"; the "Delta Cats" were actually Ike Turner and his Kings of Rhythm.

Rocket 88 may also refer to:

- Oldsmobile 88 models with a Rocket V8 engine
- Rocket 88 (band), British boogie-woogie band active in the late 1970s and early 1980s
  - Rocket 88 (album), 1981 live album by the band Rocket 88
- Mitch Woods and His Rocket 88's, American "rock-a-boogie" band active since the early 1980s
- RS-88, rocket engine
