= Colin Purbrook =

English jazz pianist and songwriter

- Born: Colin Purbrook; 26 February 1936; Seaford, East Sussex, UK
- Died: 5 February 1999 (aged 62) London
- Genres: Jazz
- Occupation(s): Musician; Songwriter
- Instrument(s): Piano; Double Bass; Trumpet
- Years active: 1947-1999

Colin Thomas Purbrook (26 February 1936 – 5 February 1999) was an English jazz pianist and songwriter. He also played double-bass and, occasionally, trumpet.

== Early life ==
Purbrook was born in Seaford, East Sussex and learned piano from the age of six from his father, who was also a professional pianist. As a young boy aged just 11 in 1947 he won three Challenge Cups at the Brighton Music Festival. He then studied music at Fitzwilliam College, Cambridge. As well as playing piano, Purbrook also played on the trombone with the Cambridge University Jazz Band which featured in the Rank film Bachelor of Hearts from 1958.

== Career ==
He left Cambridge in 1957 and joined Sandy Brown's quintet on double bass for a six-month period at the popular 100 Club in Oxford Street, London. He played piano for three years with Al Fairweather's All Stars, and also played with Kenny Ball, both as a pianist and on trumpet and double bass. In the early 1960s he worked with Kenny Baker, Ian Carr, Tony Coe, Bert Courtley, Jimmy Deuchar, Wally Fawkes, Alan Ganley, Derek Hogg, Dudley Moore (as bassist), John Picard, Don Rendell, Ronnie Ross, and Ronnie Scott.

In 1961 he worked alongside composer and musician Charles Mingus on the music score for the film All Night Long which was eventually released in February 1962. Later in the decade he continued working with Brown and Coe, as well as with Brian Lemon (on bass), Humphrey Lyttelton, and Phil Seamen on drums. He also led his own smaller and larger ensembles. He was also on piano for the BBC 2's music programme Jazz 625 with Dakota Staton and the Keith Christie All Stars respectively. In addition, he has worked as a member of Benny Goodman's sextet when the clarinettist recorded a special gala performance for BBC2 in 1964.

He often played, through choice, with drummer Phil Seamen, a musician whom he admired, and he joined Seamen's Trio during the late 1960s and early '70s.

Purbrook was a frequent sideman for Americans touring the UK, and worked over the course of his career with Chet Baker, Ruby Braff, Benny Carter, Doc Cheatham, Eddie Lockjaw Davis, Art Farmer, Dexter Gordon, Barney Kessel, Howard McGhee, James Moody, Annie Ross, Zoot Sims, and Buddy Tate. He was involved with the production of a number of stage plays from the 1970s through the 1990s, and led trios and quartets into the 1990s. In 1990 he took up the post of resident solo pianist at the L'Escargot Restaurant in Soho, London as well as later in the 1990s at Kettners Hotel also in Soho.

During the Nineties he continued to tour and appear on radio and television and, despite the fact that he began to suffer from rheumatoid arthritis in 1995, worked at the same unrelenting pace as before. He was able to do this because of the unique skills of his consultant at the Central Middlesex Hospital, Dr Bernard Colacco, a jazz fan who often went to listen to Purbrook at the Pizza Express Jazz Club.

== Personal life ==
Purbrook was married in 1974 to Maureen Young. They had one son with the marriage being dissolved in 1983.

He died in London of cancer in February, 1999.

== Stage performances ==
- Beyond the Fringe (1963)
- Bubbling Brown Sugar (1977)
- One Mo' Time (1981)
- Lady Day (1987)
- Rent Party (1989)
- The Cotton Club (1992)
