= Automatic (Jack Bruce album) =

Studio album by Jack Bruce
- Released: January 1983
- Studio: Brittania Row, London
- Genre: Electronica; synth-pop; jazz-rock; blues-rock
- Length: 35:40
- Label: Intercord
- Producer: Jack Bruce, Ike Nossel

Jack Bruce chronology
I've Always Wanted to Do This (1980)	Automatic (1983)	A Question of Time (1989)

Automatic is the eighth studio album by Scottish musician Jack Bruce, released in January 1983. It makes heavy use of the Fairlight CMI digital sampling synthesiser and Bruce is the sole performer. The album was originally only released in Germany, on the Intercord label.

== Track listing ==
All tracks are written by Jack Bruce and Pete Brown.

No.	Title	Length
1.	"Make Love, Pt. 2"	3:40
2.	"Uptown Breakdown"	4:30
3.	"Travelling Child"	5:12
4.	"New World"	3:24
5.	"E. Boogie"	4:28
6.	"Green & Blue"	5:13
7.	"The Swarm"	4:01
8.	"Encore"	4:10
9.	"Automatic Pilot"	1:02

== Personnel ==
- Jack Bruce - vocals, bass, keyboards, Fairlight CMI digital sampling synthesizer, drum programming
