= Out of the Storm (Jack Bruce album) =

Studio album by Jack Bruce
- Released: November 1974
- Recorded: October 1973 – April 1974
- Genres: Rock, jazz rock, blues rock
- Label: RSO
- Producers: Jack Bruce, Andy Johns

Jack Bruce chronology
Harmony Row (1971)	Out of the Storm (1974)	How's Tricks (1977)

Professional ratings
Review scores
Source	Rating
AllMusic	3/5 stars

Out of the Storm is the fourth studio album by Scottish musician Jack Bruce, released in 1974. It was Bruce's fourth solo effort in the aftermath of the dissolution of Cream and the power trio West, Bruce and Laing.

Bruce had wanted to title the album Into The Storm but, according to Bruce, "we couldn't find any stormy weather. We gave up and instead we found a little wood". The album was largely recorded in Los Angeles and San Francisco at the suggestion of engineer Andy Johns, who felt, according to Bruce, that the problem with Bruce's previous work was that he "work(ed) with too many British guys and you need to work with some great American session players and you could make an album in ten days".

Bruce recorded the album while still addicted to heroin (which contributed to the dissolution of West, Bruce and Laing). According to Bruce's songwriting partner Pete Brown, the band ingested PCP during one session and "they were all holding onto each other walking across the floor--Bobby Keys, Jim Keltner, Andy Johns and Jack. Someone said, 'Don't let go of me or I'll float off into space'". The continued and heavy drug use periodically interfered with completion of the album and engineer Dennis Weinreich was brought in to remix specific tracks so as to complete the album in a timely fashion and because the label wasn't pleased with Johns' mix of the album.

The album peaked at No. 160 on the Billboard album chart in December 1974. Critically well received, including a glowing review by Melody Maker's Allan Jones, who stated that Bruce was "one of the most important individuals currently working in rock", the album sold poorly.

Out of the Storm was the last Jack Bruce album distributed in the United States by Atlantic Records, as Bruce's company RSO Records, which was affiliated in the rest of the world with Polydor/Polygram, would shift U.S. distribution to Polydor beginning in 1976.

== Cover ==
Bruce, and the photographer Roger Phillips, traveled to Oban (Scotland) hoping for stormy weather, relating to Bruce's original album title Into the Storm. They were unable to find suitable weather and, as daylight was fading, Jack and Roger found their way to a forest clearing where they decided to create the image. Roger had elected to bring phosphorus flash bulbs (notoriously unreliable and difficult to calculate exposure) and created the atmosphere where Bruce seemed to be sheltering, out of the storm, which led to Bruce changing the album title. Bruce is in the background sitting partially in the dark with the landscape and a rusty old bike (left by some previous traveller) leaning against a tree in the foreground. Author Harry Shapiro in his book on Bruce suggested that the photo represented Bruce's state of mind at the time, wanting to disappear into the background and avoid all of the difficulties he was then facing.

== 2003 and 2011 reissues ==
The reissue of the album in 2003 (put out again by Esoteric Records in 2011) included a handful of the original mixes prepared for the album. In contrast to the finished album, the early mixes sound muddy and lack the studio polish that was added to the final version of the album. The reissue includes full liner notes on the recording and production of the album, but mistakenly credits "Pieces of Mind" as "Peaces of Mind".

== Track listing ==
All lyrics written by Pete Brown, music by Jack Bruce, except track 3 – music co-authored by Janet Godfrey.

1. "Pieces of Mind" – 5:39
2. "Golden Days" – 5:14
3. "Running Through Our Hands" – 4:14
4. "Keep on Wondering" – 3:10
5. "Keep It Down" – 3:46
6. "Into the Storm" – 4:45
7. "One" – 5:03
8. "Timeslip" – 6:33

=== 2003 CD bonus tracks ===
9. "Pieces of Mind" (First Mix)
10. "Keep On Wondering" (First Mix)
11. "Keep It Down" (First Mix)
12. "Into the Storm" (First Mix)
13. "One" (First Mix)

== Personnel ==
Performance

- Jack Bruce – vocals, bass guitar, keyboards, harmonica
- Steve Hunter – electric & acoustic guitars
- Jim Keltner – drums (tracks: 2–6, 10–12)
- Jim Gordon – drums (tracks: 1, 7–9, 13)

Production

- Jack Bruce – producer, arranger
- Andy Johns – engineer, producer
- Austin – engineer
- Dennis Weinreich – remix engineer

Recorded at Record Plant in Los Angeles and San Francisco. Mixed at Record Plant in Los Angeles and San Francisco and at Olympic and Scorpio Studios in London.
