= Harmony Row =

Album by Jack Bruce

Studio album by Jack Bruce
- Released: July 1971
- Recorded: January 1971
- Studios: Command Studios, London
- Genres: Progressive rock, jazz-rock, blues-rock
- Length: 42:39
- Labels: Atco (US); Polydor (UK)
- Producer: Jack Bruce

Jack Bruce chronology
Things We Like (1970)	Harmony Row (1971)	Out of the Storm (1974)

Harmony Row is the third studio album by the Scottish musician Jack Bruce, released in July 1971.

The album takes its title from a tenement street in Glasgow, near where Bruce grew up. The street, since demolished, was famous as the largest unbroken houserow in Europe, stretching for over a mile. The album's cover photo was taken near the Harmony Row tenement in Govan.

Although since cited by Bruce as his favourite solo album, Harmony Row did not chart upon its release. The album would be his last solo effort for over three years, as Bruce would join the power trio West, Bruce and Laing (with whom he would record three albums) in early 1972. The song "The Consul at Sunset", which was inspired by the Malcolm Lowry novel Under the Volcano, was released as a single in 1971 (Polydor 2058–153, b/w "A Letter of Thanks").

== Background and recording ==
The vocals, guitars, and drums for each track were all recorded together, "live" style. The guitarist, Chris Spedding, later described the atmosphere of the sessions: "[Drummer] John Marshall said to me one day, in the beginning of our work day, 'I wonder what Jack's got for us today,' you know, some of it was quite challenging stuff. 'I hope we do it all right. I hope we don't make too many mistakes.' In a good way. You know, tension, and hoping that you get it all right. And of course, once we started playing, it was so intense, the concentration - I don't even know if I could do such a thing today. We were in our twenties then."

== Reception ==
Professional ratings
Review scores
Source	Rating
AllMusic	3.5/5 stars
The Encyclopedia of Popular Music	4/5 stars
The Village Voice	C+

On its release, Tony Palmer wrote in the London Observer:

The musicality is polished and exact. The spontaneity of the performance suffers a little, but that is a small price to pay for the skill of the recording. The music flows precisely out of the nuances of the words; their meanings inexplicably linked with the kind of sound produced. It’s almost impossible to imagine the songs being performed in any other way by any other group of musicians.

== Track listing ==
All lyrics composed by Pete Brown and music composed by Jack Bruce, unless otherwise noted.

1. "Can You Follow?" – 1:32
2. "Escape to the Royal Wood (On Ice)" – 3:44
3. "You Burned the Tables on Me" – 3:49
4. "There's a Forest" – 1:44
5. "Morning Story" (Bruce, Brown, Janet Godfrey (Note: The album's liner notes credit only Bruce and Brown for writing all the songs, but the record label on the ATCO release additionally credits Godfrey on "Morning Story", and BMI records (see BMI work #884834301) confirm that Godfrey is co-author of the song with Bruce and Brown.)) – 4:55
6. "Folk Song" – 4:20
7. "Smiles and Grins" – 6:05
8. "Post War" – 4:20
9. "A Letter of Thanks" – 2:54
10. "Victoria Sage" – 5:02
11. "The Consul at Sunset" – 4:14

=== 2003 CD bonus tracks ===
12. "Green Hills" (instrumental version of "Can You Follow?") – 2:16
13. "You Burned the Tables on Me" (remix including electric piano) – 4:10
14. "There's a Forest" (first take) – 2:11
15. "Escape to the Royal Wood (On Ice)" (instrumental demo version) – 4:01
16. "Can You Follow?" (first take) – 1:32

== Personnel ==
- Jack Bruce – vocals, basses, acoustic piano, harmonium, organ, cellos, harmonica, production, arrangements
- Chris Spedding – guitars
- John Marshall – drums

Technical

- Andy Johns – engineer (track 15)
- Barry Ainsworth – engineer (all other selections)

Track No. 15 recorded at Morgan Studios, London, 6 October 1969.
All other tracks recorded at Command Studios, London, mid- to late January 1971.
