= Big Blues =

Big Blues may refer to:

- Big Blues (Jimmy Witherspoon album), 1981
- Big Blues (Art Farmer album), 1978
