= Rafe Gomez =

American writer and DJ

Rafael Gomez
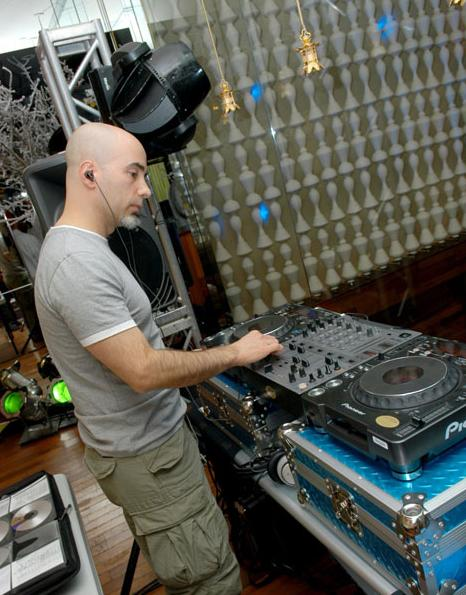
- Rafael Gomez
- Occupations: Writer, business strategy consultant, lecturer, music producer, and DJ
- Writing career
- Subject: Business

Rafael Gomez is an American business writer, sales support consultant, lecturer, music producer, and DJ.

== Early life ==
Gomez grew up in northern New Jersey.

== DJ career ==
=== The Groove Boutique ===
==== Sirius Satellite Radio ====
In the 1980s through early 2000s, Gomez had been working as a producer of library music for film and television and also a jazz/groove club DJ in northern New Jersey. In 2002, Gomez approached Sirius Satellite Radio with the idea of hosting, performing, and producing a weekend jazz mix show. Sirius hired Gomez to create the show, which was named “In The Mix” and featured six hours of Saturday evening programming on Sirius’ Planet Jazz channel.

Gomez’s mixes incorporated acid jazz, Latin boogaloo, bossa nova, jazz fusion, nu jazz, jazz-funk, "cratedigger" jams, and groove-oriented tracks. His mixing style, which he developed as a club DJ in Jersey City, NJ, didn’t utilize quick cuts or scratching: he let the songs play for almost their entire length, and then beat-matched the gaps, breaks, or fades with the intros of his next chosen selections that had the same beats-per-minute count. This approach to the presentation of jazz was heavily influenced by the open, programming-driven spinning styles of such New York DJ’s as Ted Currier (WBLS, The Funhouse), Jonathan Fearing (WBLS), and Larry Levan (The Paradise Garage).

==== WQCD-FM and national syndication ====
His work attracted the attention of WQCD-FM/CD101.9 in New York. Executives at CD101.9 were seeking ways to attract younger listeners to the station. They arranged for Gomez to have a show syndicated to smooth jazz stations in major American markets, and in September 2003, Gomez’s program – “The Groove Boutique” – aired for two hours on Saturday evenings. “The Groove Boutique” began to generate media coverage for Gomez (and CD101.9), and became a top rated Saturday night program (8pm-midnight) in the New York market.

In 2005, Gomez was honored as a Finalist in the Best Mix Show DJ category by the New York Radio Market (NYMRAD) A.I.R. Awards.

==== Productions ====
Gomez compiled and created the first continuous mix jazz CD in 2003 with the release “Smooth Grooves 4”, on Higher Octave Records (“A happy, rhythm-intensive shock… a cutting edge, clubland vibe… a whole new sonic level… Gomez keeps the grooves hopping.” – Allmusic). The album featured a merge of contemporary jazz and world music selections by such artists as Four80East, Acoustic Alchemy, Tom Scott, Les Nubians, and Sacred Spirit.

In 2004, Gomez compiled and mixed “Groove Boutique:Volume One” on Tommy Boy Records. The CD included deep groove jazzy funk by such artists as Jimjam, Ramsey Lewis, Soulive, and The Headhunters.

The album also included the nu bossa track “Icy”, which Gomez co-produced with David Baron at Edison Studios in New York (“A treat.” – Allmusic; “A funky, Latin-flavored little number.” – CD Universe; “Amazing.” - Amazon). “Icy” was a top 10 requested hit on smooth jazz radio stations across the U.S.

In 2005, Gomez returned to Edison Studios with Baron to create a jazz remix of Smokey Robinson’s 1975 soul hit “A Quiet Storm” for the album Motown Remixed. Gomez and Baron maintained the song’s original vocal and flute tracks and floated them over a new production that featured a four-piece jazz combo, which included drummer Jojo Mayer and vibraphonist Roy Ayers (“Never sounded better.” – The Couch Sessions; “Lush, subtle.” – Billboard; “Gomez and Baron absolutely FREAKED this song.” – Image Eye Nation); "An unheralded gem." - Roy Ayers Project. The Groove Boutique remix of “Quiet Storm” became an international club hit and a favorite of British DJ Gilles Peterson.

==== QVC ====
In 2005 and 2006, Gomez hosted a one-hour program on QVC called “The Groove Boutique”, where he sold jazz and groove CDs and welcomed live guest performances from Marcus Johnson, Jason Miles, Steve Oliver, and Bobby Caldwell.

==== Live performances ====
Gomez performed live at jazz festivals, lounges, clubs, cruises, and food/wine events across the United States from 2004 through the end of 2008. Gomez’s usage of the Yamaha DD65 Digital Percussion Kit grew out a desire to present more of a show for his club and festival audiences. Since he wasn’t scratching, he felt that playing the DD65 would not only be entertaining for clubgoers, it would also allow him to create live percussion overdubs on-the-fly throughout his sets.

=== Rockmixx ===
Another of Gomez’s DJ projects was Rockmixx, which was billed as “the world’s first party rock mash-up feature”. On Rockmixx, Gomez took energetic, uptempo classic rock hits by such artists as Led Zeppelin, Lynyrd Skynyrd, Van Halen, Def Leppard, Aerosmith, Queen, and Guns N' Roses and matched them by key and beats-per-minute with other classic rock hits. He merged the tracks using a drop-in style that was reminiscent of the rhythmic sound collages which were pioneered by Double Dee and Steinski and MARRS in the 1980s.

=== Danceteria REWIND ===
In February 2022, DJ Rafe Gomez launched a weekly show on TWITCH called DanceteriaREWIND that features music from the fabled New York City nightclub Danceteria that was popular in the 1980s.

In November 2026, Gomez was enlisted to curate music for "New York Superstars", an art exhibit at Casa Cavazzini in Udine, Italy. The show features works by artists whose visions were influenced and shaped by the music at the Danceteria nightclub.

== Business strategy consulting ==
Gomez works as a consultant, providing competitive differentiation, sales support media coverage, and executive thought leadership development services to companies around the world. His perspectives on a variety of business topics have been featured in such media outlets as Forbes, CNBC, Inc., MSNBC, CMO.com, SalesAndMarketing.com, MarketingProfs.com, PR Daily, Under30CEO.com, the New York Daily News, FoxBusiness.com, Yahoo! Small Business, Direct Marketing News, Mashable, Business 2 Community, CBS MoneyWatch, the American Express OPEN Forum, Brandweek, Adweek, and Entrepreneur.

In October 2017, Gomez was honored as the Best Sole Practitioner of the Year by Bulldog Reporter's Bulldog Awards Stars of PR.

=== The Rehirement Coach ===
When his career as a jazz DJ came to an end in 2008, Gomez had a difficult time finding work. He studied the available job search literature, attended seminars, and spent time researching career tips online, but nothing was helpful. He then applied a little-known sales strategy that was successful for him when he appeared on QVC to his job search efforts, and he immediately began getting work as a copywriter and marketing consultant (which is what Gomez did prior to his DJ pursuits).

Gomez took his discovery and used it as the theme for an audiobook entitled “What’s In It For Me? A Powerful New Interview Strategy To Get You Hired In Today’s Challenging Economy”. Gomez wrote, narrated, and produced the audiobook, which featured music by jazz guitarist Matt Marshak in the chapter transitions.

== SalesStrategy2GetHired ==
In August 2021, Gomez launched SalesStrategy2GetHired, a TikTok channel to offer a sales-driven approach that aims to help TikTok users land a job offer. The guidance that Gomez presents is based on his experience as a sales support consultant for organizations around the world.
