= Silver Rails =

Studio album by Jack Bruce
- Released: 25 March 2014
- Studios: Abbey Road Studios, London
- Genres: Rock; jazz-rock; blues rock; Latin
- Length: 47:31
- Label: Esoteric Antenna
- Producer: Rob Cass

Jack Bruce chronology
More Jack than God (2003)	Silver Rails (2014)

Professional ratings
Review scores
Source	Rating
Allmusic	3.5/5 stars
All About Jazz	(very favorable)

Silver Rails is the fourteenth and final studio album by Scottish musician Jack Bruce, released in March 2014. It was recorded at Abbey Road Studios with producer Rob Cass. The song "Rusty Lady" is about Margaret Thatcher. The cover art was created by artist Sacha Jafri. The 11-year gap from More Jack than God (2003) was the longest between two of Bruce's albums. He died 7 months after the album's release.

== Track listing ==
All songs by Jack Bruce and Pete Brown unless otherwise stated.

1. "Candlelight" (Bruce, Margrit Seyffer) – 4:20
2. "Reach for the Night" – 6:19
3. "Fields of Forever" – 4:35
4. "Hidden Cities" (Bruce, Kip Hanrahan) – 5:01
5. "Don't Look Now" – 5:06
6. "Rusty Lady" – 5:13
7. "Industrial Child" – 3:40
8. "Drone" (Bruce) – 4:47
9. "Keep It Down" – 4:57
10. "No Surrender" – 3:33

== Personnel ==
- Jack Bruce − vocals, bass guitar (tracks 1–6 and 8–10), piano (tracks 3–5, and 7), Mellotron (tracks 9 and 10)
- Phil Manzanera − lead guitar (track 1)
- Uli Jon Roth − lead guitar (track 4)
- Robin Trower − lead guitar (track 6)
- Bernie Marsden − lead guitar (tracks 9 and 10)
- Malcolm Bruce − acoustic guitar (track 2), guitar (tracks 5 and 6)
- Tony Remy − guitar (tracks 1–3), acoustic guitar (track 7)
- Pearse MacIntyre − acoustic guitar (track 3)
- John Medeski − organ (tracks 1, 2, 4, 5, and 9), mellotron (track 5)
- Frank Tontoh − drums (tracks 1–3, 5, 6, and 9)
- Cindy Blackman Santana − drums (tracks 4 and 10)
- Milos Pál − drums (track 8), djembe (track 1)
- Rob Cass − percussion (tracks 1, 3, and 6), backing vocals (track 10)
- Derek Nash − tenor saxophone (tracks 1, 2, and 3)
- Winston Rollins − trombone (tracks 1 and 3)
- Russell Bennett − trumpet (tracks 1 and 3)
- Aruba Red − vocals (track 4)
- Chantelle Nandi − vocals (track 4)
- Julie Iwheta − vocals (track 4)
- Kyla Bruce − vocals (track 4)
