= Rocket 88 (album) =

Live album by Rocket 88
- Released: March 1981
- Recorded: November 17, 1979
- Venue: Rotation Club, Hanover, Germany
- Genre: Boogie-woogie; blues
- Label: Atlantic
- Producer: Ian "Stu" Stewart

Professional ratings
Review scores
Source	Rating
AllMusic	4.5/5 stars

Rocket 88 is an album recorded live in Germany in 1981 by the boogie-woogie band Rocket 88. The band had a casual line-up, and founder/producer/band-member Ian Stewart in his liner notes makes reference to the other "permanent" band-members who were not present for that particular recording. Although it is rumoured that there are numerous bootleg live takes from other concerts, it is the band's only officially released album. It was recorded using the Rolling Stones Mobile Studio. They also recorded a "live in the studio" album called Blues & Boogie Explosion.

== Track listing ==
Side 1

1. "Rocket 88" (Pete Johnson) – 7:27
2. "Waiting for the Call" (Jack Bruce/Peter Brown) – 10:16
3. "St. Louis Blues" (W.C. Handy) – 7:55

Side 2

1. "Roll 'Em Pete" (Pete Johnson/Joe Turner) – 5:52
2. "Swindon Swing" (Colin Smith) – 7:34
3. "Roadhouse Boogie" (Pete Johnson) – 7:17
4. "Talking About Louise" (Alexis Korner) – 5:14

== Personnel ==
- Alexis Korner – guitar and vocals on 4, 5, 6, 7
- Ian "Stu" Stewart – piano on 5
- Jack Bruce – bass and vocals on 2
- Charlie Watts – drums
- Colin Smith – trumpet
- John Picard – trombone
- Hal "Cornbread" Singer – tenor saxophone
- Don Weller – tenor saxophone
- Bob Hall – piano
- George Green – piano
