= Hal Singer =

American musician (1919–2020)

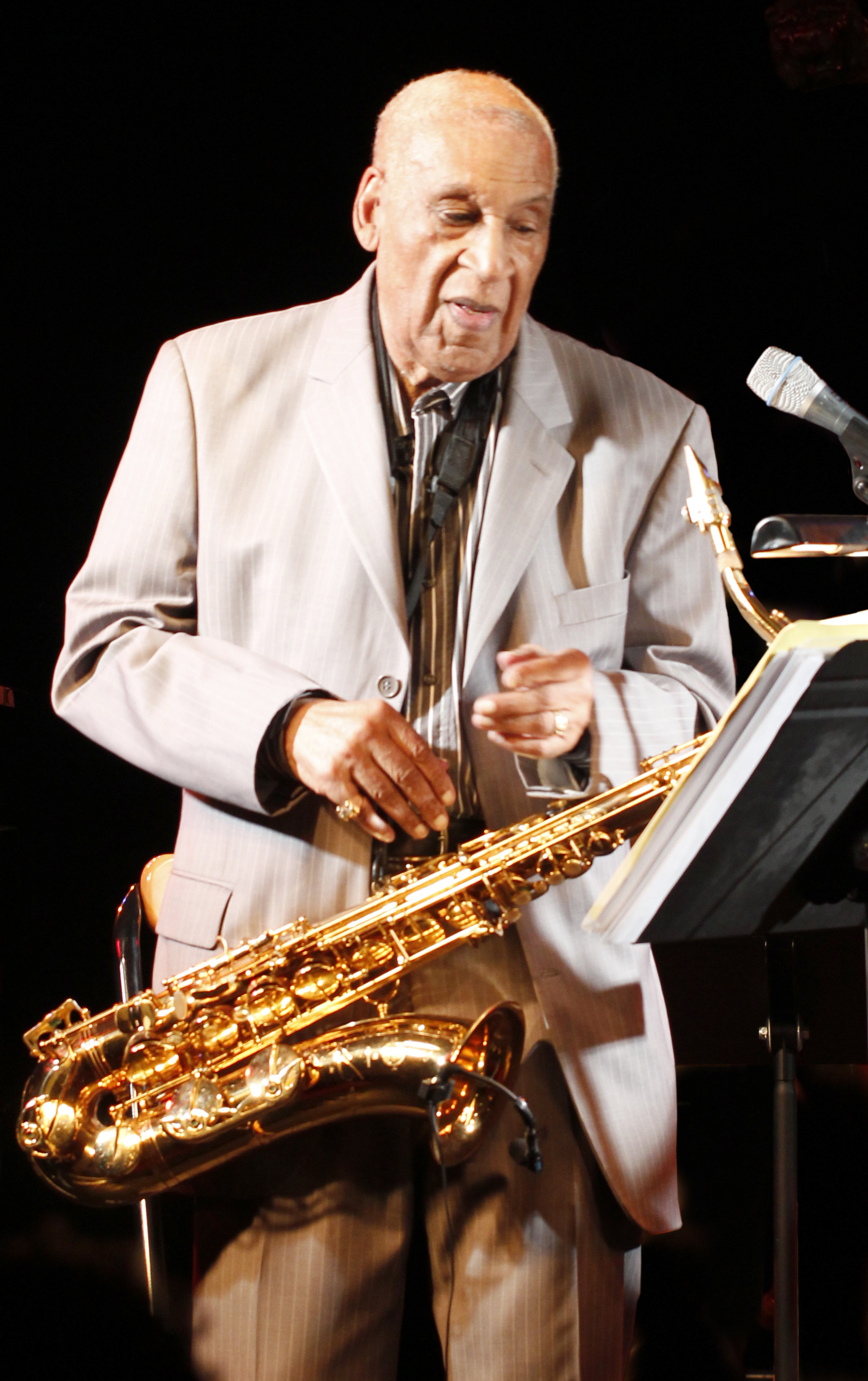
- Singer in 2012

Background information
- Also known as: Hal "Cornbread" Singer
- Born: Harold Joseph Singer; October 8, 1919; Tulsa, Oklahoma, U.S.
- Died: August 18, 2020 (aged 100) Chatou, France
- Genres: Jazz, rhythm and blues
- Occupation: Musician
- Instrument: Saxophone
- Years active: Late 1930s–1990

Harold Joseph Singer (October 8, 1919 – August 18, 2020), also known as Hal "Cornbread" Singer, was an American R&B and jazz bandleader and saxophonist.

== Early life ==
Harold Joseph Singer was born in Greenwood, an African-American district of Tulsa, Oklahoma, to father Charles and mother Anna Mae. His father was employed by an oil-drilling tools manufacturer and his mother was a caterer. He was a survivor of the 1921 Tulsa race massacre, during which his family's home was burnt down. Singer and his mother were helped to travel to Kansas City during the riot by his mother's white employer. There they waited out the violence with family until they could return. The official records of Singer's birth were destroyed during the violence.

Singer studied violin as a child but later switched to reed instruments. He ultimately settled on the tenor saxophone influenced by hearing Ben Webster and Lester Young.

On the advice of his father to pursue a "proper" career, Singer attended the Hampton Institute and graduated in 1939 with a degree in agriculture. While studying, Singer regularly took time off to tour with local bands.

== Career ==
From the late 1930s, Singer began performing in local bands, including Ernie Fields', before joining Jay McShann's orchestra in 1943 and then moving to New York. After working in other bands, he joined Oran "Hot Lips" Page's band in 1947 and began working as a session musician with King Records.

In early 1948, he left Page, formed his own small group, and was signed to Mercury Records where he cut his first single "Fine As Wine" with a B side "Rock Around the Clock" (not the same tune as the Bill Haley recording), co-written with Sam Theard. For the Savoy label, he recorded the instrumental "Corn Bread", which made No. 1 on the R&B charts in September 1948, and raised Singer's profile and his nickname. His follow-up the following year, "Beef Stew", was a much smaller hit.

In the early and mid-1950s, he recorded with Mercury, toured with R&B artists such as The Orioles and Charles Brown, and increasingly worked as a session musician. In 1958, he began recording with Prestige Records as a jazz soloist and performing at the Metropole Cafe in New York with jazz musicians such as Roy Eldridge and Coleman Hawkins.

In 1965, after touring Europe with Earl Hines' group, Singer remained in France, settling near Paris. He continued to record and also toured extensively around Europe and Africa, performing with the Duke Ellington Orchestra and Charlie Watts.

=== Later ===
Singer appears on the 1981 live recording Rocket 88 with the UK-based boogie-woogie band Rocket 88. Also in the summer of 1981, Singer visited London, where he recorded two albums for John Stedman's record label, JSP. The first album, Swing on it (JSP 1028), was recorded with British musicians, including Jim Mullen, Peter King, Mike Carr and Harold Smith, while the second, recorded a day later with the same group, also featured Jimmy Witherspoon (Big Blues, JSP 1032).

Singer shared artist billing on a recording made in 1989, along with Al Copley, Royal Blue, released on the Black Top label in 1990.

=== Acting ===
He appeared as an actor in the feature film Taxi Blues (1990).

== Honors, awards, distinctions ==
Singer's 1969 album, Paris Soul Food, featuring him on saxophone and vocals; Robin Hemingway, vocals, arrangements and album production; and Manu Dibango, saxophone, organ and arrangements won a French Record Academy award for best international LP.

In 1974, he went on a State Department tour of Africa with Horace Parlan. Singer was awarded the prestigious title of "Chevalier des Arts" by the French government.

== Legacy ==
A documentary film, Hal Singer, Keep the Music Going (1999), was directed by Guetty Felin. It was made in collaboration with the CNC in France and the French cable music network Muzzik. The documentary wove into the narrative Singer's personal super-8 movies, archival images of the jazz era, and footage of Singer's home in Paris, in concert and teaching jazz to the younger generation of musicians in France. Spoken-word poet Jessica Care Moore is featured in a duet with Singer.

== Personal life ==
Singer became a centenarian on 8 October 2019. He died on August 18, 2020.

== Discography ==
- 1948: "Fine As Wine" & "Rock Around the Clock" (Mercury)
- 1948: "Corn Bread" – as leader
- 1949: "Beef Stew" – as leader
- 1959: Blue Stompin' – Hal Singer and the Charlie Shavers Quintet (Prestige)
- 1960: Blues by Lonnie Johnson – Lonnie Johnson Quintet (Bluesville)
- 1963: Blues in the Night – as leader (Fidelio)
- 1968: A Funky Day in Paris – Johnny Letman (Black & Blue)
- 1968: Milt and Hal – Milt Buckner (Black & Blue)
- 1969: Paris Soul Food – as leader (Polydor)
- 1969: Kidney Stew is Fine − Eddie "Cleanhead" Vinson (Delmark)
- 1971: Blues and News – as leader (Marge)

1973 T-Bone Walker “I Want a Little Girl” Delmark Records (recorded 1968, released 1973)

- 1973: Grey's Mood – Al Grey (Black & Blue)
- 1975: Soul of Africa – as leader (Le Chant du Monde)
- 1977: Le Grand Voyage / The Long Trip – as leader (Pastoral)
- 1981: Rocket 88 – Rocket 88
- 1981: Swing on it – as leader (JSP)
- 1990: Royal Blue – as co-lead with Al Copley – (Black Top)
- 2010: Challenge – as co-lead with David Murray – (Marge)
