= How's Tricks =

Studio album by Jack Bruce
- Released: 1977
- Recorded: October–December 1976
- Studio: Manor
- Genres: Rock, jazz-rock, blues-rock
- Length: 42:18 (initial release), 52:00 (2003 reissue)
- Label: RSO
- Producer: Bill Halverson

Jack Bruce chronology
| Out of the Storm (1974) | How's Tricks (1977) | Jet Set Jewel (1978) |

How's Tricks is the fifth studio album by Scottish musician Jack Bruce, released in 1977 through RSO Records. It is credited to the Jack Bruce Band.

The album peaked at No. 153 on the Billboard album chart in May 1977. It would be Bruce's last album released under Robert Stigwood's management (and, consequently, his last for RSO); although the Jack Bruce Band would remain under contract with Stigwood for another year, the band's 1978 album Jet Set Jewel was rejected by Stigwood and RSO as not commercially viable, with the band subsequently dropped from the label. Bruce's leaving Stigwood/RSO ended a fifteen-year affiliation that began in 1963 when Bruce joined the Graham Bond Organisation.

== Critical reception ==
Professional ratings
Review scores
| Source | Rating |
|---|---|
| AllMusic | 4/5 stars |
| The Encyclopedia of Popular Music | 3/5 stars |
| MusicHound Rock: The Essential Album Guide | 1/5 stars |
| The Rolling Stone Album Guide | 2/5 stars |

MusicHound Rock: The Essential Album Guide deemed the album "an uninspired set of 10 lackluster tunes." The Rolling Stone Album Guide called it "a journeyman effort hardly worth dredging up."

== Track listing ==
1. "Without a Word" (Jack Bruce, Pete Brown) - 5:26
2. "Johnny B'77" (Jack Bruce, Pete Brown) - 3:23
3. "Times" (Jack Bruce, Pete Brown, Hughie Burns) - 4:49
4. "Baby Jane" (Hughie Burns) - 2:37
5. "Lost Inside a Song" (Jack Bruce, Pete Brown, Hughie Burns) - 4:04
6. "How's Tricks" (Jack Bruce, Pete Brown) - 4:12
7. "Madhouse" (Jack Bruce, Pete Brown) - 3:45
8. "Waiting for the Call" (Jack Bruce, Pete Brown) - 5:48
9. "Outsiders" (Jack Bruce, Pete Brown) - 2:57
10. "Something to Live For" (Tony Hymas, Pete Brown) - 5:19

2003 CD bonus tracks

11. "Without a Word" (recorded at Scorpio Sound, London, 28th November 1974) (Jack Bruce, Pete Brown) - 5:50
12. "Something to Live For" (single edit) (Tony Hymas, Pete Brown) - 3:52

== Personnel ==
- Jack Bruce – vocals, bass, harmonica
- Hughie Burns – guitars, backing vocals, lead vocals on "Baby Jane"
- Tony Hymas – keyboards, vibraphone, backing vocals
- Simon Phillips – drums, glockenspiel, backing vocals
