= Jet Set Jewel =

Studio album by Jack Bruce
- Released: 5 May 2003
- Recorded: August–October 1978
- Studio: Chipping Norton; Trident, London
- Genre: Rock, jazz-rock, blues-rock
- Length: 44:23
- Label: Polydor
- Producer: Dennis MacKay

Jack Bruce chronology
How's Tricks (1977)	Jet Set Jewel (2003)	I've Always Wanted to Do This (1980)

Jet Set Jewel is the sixth studio album by Scottish musician Jack Bruce. The album was recorded in 1978 with the same musicians as his previous album, How's Tricks, but was rejected as uncommercial and not released until Polydor Records' Jack Bruce re-issue campaign in 2003.

== Track listing ==
No.	Title	Writer(s)	Length
1.	"The Boy"	Jack Bruce, David Hart	4:14
2.	"Head in the Sun"	Tony Hymas, Pete Brown	4:33
3.	"Neighbour, Neighbour"	Alton Valier	3:58
4.	"Childsong"	Jack Bruce, Tony Hymas, Pete Brown	3:28
5.	"Jet Set Jewel"	Jack Bruce, Pete Brown	5:22
6.	"Please"	Tony Hymas	2:39
7.	"Maybe the Dawn"	Tony Hymas, Pete Brown	4:02
8.	"Mickey the Fiddler"	Jack Bruce, David Hart	5:21
9.	"She's Moving On"	Jack Bruce, David Hart	6:24
10.	"The Best Is Still to Come"	Jack Bruce, Pete Brown	4:14

== Personnel ==
- Jack Bruce - vocals, bass, piano, cello
- Hughie Burns - guitars, backing vocals
- Tony Hymas - keyboards, backing vocals
- Simon Phillips - drums, backing vocals
- Dick Heckstall-Smith - saxophone on 1 & 3
