= Derek Hogg (musician) =

English jazz drummer (1928–2020)

Derek Hogg (8 April 1928 – 2020) was an English jazz drummer.

== Life and career ==
Hogg was born in Oldham, Lancashire on 8 April 1928. He played early in his career with marching bands. Hogg began working in professional ensembles in the 1950s, including those of Freddy Randall, Don Rendell, Joe Saye, Ken Moule, Buddy Featherstonhaugh, and Kenny Baker, as well as with Sandy Brown and Al Fairweather's All Stars group. He played with Vic Lewis in 1959-1960, then with The Squadronaires and Dudley Moore in the first few years of the decade. In 1962 he began working with Danny Moss, with whom he would continue to perform until the end of his career, and also worked later with Rosemary Clooney, Tony Coe, Digby Fairweather, Budd Johnson, Colin Purbrook, and Teddy Wilson.

He retired from active performance in 1987. Hogg died in 2020.

== Sources ==
- "Derek Hogg". The New Grove Dictionary of Jazz. 2nd edition, ed. Barry Kernfeld.
