= Things May Come and Things May Go but the Art School Dance Goes on Forever =

Studio album by Pete Brown and Piblokto!
- Released: March 1970
- Genre: Rock
- Length: 43:30
- Label: Harvest
- Producer: Pete Brown

Pete Brown and Piblokto! chronology
Things May Come and Things May Go but the Art School Dance Goes on Forever (1970)	Thousands on a Raft (1970)

Things May Come and Things May Go but the Art School Dance Goes on Forever is the first album by Pete Brown and Piblokto!, released in 1970 on Harvest Records. The title and cover celebrate Brown's art school background.

== Background ==
Having previously worked with Cream and Jack Bruce, Brown had been fired from his previous band, Battered Ornaments, the day before supporting The Rolling Stones in Hyde Park in July 1969. He quickly assembled another band including guitarist Jim Mullen, to make more commercial music. The song "High Flying Electric Bird" had been released as the B-side to the group's first single, "Living Life Backwards".

== Cover ==
The title is based on Ernest Holmes' quotation "Things may come and things may go, but creation goes on forever" and refers to Brown's enthusiasm for art schools in postwar Britain, which was a fertile ground for creativity and artistic influence in the 1960s. The front cover, which was designed and drawn by the artist (and good friend of Pete Brown) Mal Dean, includes drawings of former art school students, including Syd Barrett. The inner sleeve includes various cartoons of the character Piblokto.

The album was promoted on inner sleeves throughout the Harvest Records catalogue, along with albums by Pink Floyd, Deep Purple, Kevin Ayers, Barrett and Roy Harper.

The phrase "the art school dance goes on forever" was later used by the fine art movement.

== Release ==
The title track was featured on a Harvest retrospective, Harvest Festival, in 1999. The album was remastered and reissued on CD in 2009 by Repertoire Records, which added the two sides of the single "Flying Hero Sandwich" as bonus tracks.

== Track listing ==
All tracks are written by Pete Brown, except where indicated.

Side one
No.	Title	Writer(s)	Length
1.	"Things May Come and Things May Go, But the Art School Dance Goes on Forever"		5:06
2.	"High Flying Electric Bird"	Brown, Jim Mullen	4:18
3.	"Someone Like You"		5:49
4.	"Walk for Charity, Run for Money"	Brown, Mullen, Roger Bunn	5:31

Side two
No.	Title	Writer(s)	Length
5.	"Then I Must Go and Can I Keep"	Brown, Chris Spedding	3:53
6.	"My Love Is Gone Far Away"	Brown, Spedding	2:50
7.	"Golden Country Kingdom"	Brown, Mullen	3:11
8.	"Firesong"		6:01
9.	"Country Morning"	Brown, Bunn	6:48

Bonus tracks on 2009 reissue
No.	Title	Length
10.	"Flying Hero Sandwich"	3:18
11.	"My Last Band"	3:03

== Personnel ==
- Pete Brown – vocals, talking drum, Cornish slide whistle
- Jim Mullen – guitar
- Dave Thompson – organ, piano, mellotron, harmonium, soprano saxophone, bass pedals
- Roger Bunn – bass, acoustic guitar
- Rob Tait – drums

Additional personnel

- John Mumford – trombone
- Ray Crane – trumpet
- Paul Seedy – banjo
