= I've Always Wanted to Do This =

Album by Jack Bruce

Studio album by Jack Bruce
- Released: December 1980
- Recorded: August 1980
- Studios: House of Music, West Orange, New Jersey
- Genres: Rock, jazz-rock, blues-rock
- Length: 40:03
- Label: Epic
- Producers: Jack Bruce, Stephen Galfas, Clem Clempson, Billy Cobham, David Sancious

Jack Bruce chronology
Jet Set Jewel (1978)	I've Always Wanted to Do This (1980)	Automatic (1983)

I've Always Wanted to Do This is the seventh studio album by Scottish musician Jack Bruce, released in December 1980 and credited to "Jack Bruce and Friends: Clem Clempson, Billy Cobham, David Sancious". The band toured to promote the album but it was not a commercial success and it would be almost a decade before Bruce would make another album for a major label.

== Track listing ==
All tracks composed by Jack Bruce and Pete Brown; except where indicated

No.	Title	Writer(s)	Length
1.	"Hit and Run"		3:36
2.	"Running Back"	Clem Clempson, David Sancious, Gary Bell	3:49
3.	"Facelift 318"		3:23
4.	"In This Way"	David Sancious, Pete Brown	3:59
5.	"Mickey the Fiddler"	Jack Bruce, David Hart	5:12
6.	"Dancing On Air"		3:54
7.	"Livin' Without Ja"		3:12
8.	"Wind and the Sea"	Billy Cobham	3:24
9.	"Out to Lunch"	Clem Clempson, Gary Bell	2:41
10.	"Bird Alone"		6:52

== Personnel ==
- Jack Bruce - vocals, bass, harmonica
- Clem Clempson - guitar
- David Sancious - keyboards; guitar on "Living Without Ja" and "Out to Lunch"
- Billy Cobham - drums

with:

- Vin Scelsa - announcer voice on "Facelift 318"
