= A Question of Time (album) =

Studio album by Jack Bruce
- Released: 3 October 1989
- Genre: Rock and roll; funk; blues; blues rock
- Length: 52:48
- Label: Epic
- Producer: Jack Bruce, Joe Blaney

Jack Bruce chronology
Automatic (1983)	A Question of Time (1989)	Somethin Els (1993)

A Question of Time is a studio album by the Scottish musician Jack Bruce, released on 3 October 1989 by Epic Records. It was his first album for a major label in nearly a decade. He supported it with a North American tour.

== Production ==
Vernon Reid played guitar on "Life on Earth". Ginger Baker played drums on two tracks. Bruce wrote many of the songs with Pete Brown. "Blues You Can't Lose" is a cover of the Willie Dixon song.

== Critical reception ==
Professional ratings
Review scores
Source	Rating
AllMusic	4/5 stars
Orlando Sentinel	5/5 stars

The Washington Post noted that the "music sounds oddly self-referential, as if Bruce is intent on making us aware of the pivotal but overlooked role he played in the rise of Cream." The Orlando Sentinel opined that "Bruce's reedy tenor is agile and passionate, and his songwriting range is broad."

The Columbus Dispatch deemed the album "a hard-driving amalgam of blues, funk and rock." The San Jose Mercury News concluded that "the evocative, ethereal ballad 'Make Love' is one of his best songs, and his voice is a warbling treasure."

AllMusic wrote that the album "uses his mastery of jazz, pop, acoustic, and blues to give listeners what Jack Bruce does best: rock & roll."

== Track listing ==
All tracks composed by Jack Bruce and Pete Brown; except where indicated

No.	Title	Writer(s)	Length
1.	"Life on Earth"	Jack Bruce	3:20
2.	"Make Love"		3:37
3.	"No Surrender"		4:25
4.	"Flying"		4:45
5.	"Hey Now Princess"		3:17
6.	"Blues You Can't Lose"	Willie Dixon	5:26
7.	"Obsession"		3:55
8.	"Kwela"	Bruce	5:20
9.	"Let Me Be"		4:44
10.	"Only Playing Games"		4:42
11.	"A Question of Time"	Bruce	5:33
12.	"Grease the Wheels"		3:44

== Personnel ==
- Jack Bruce – vocals, bass, keyboards (2, 3), piano (4, 11), cello (9, 11), acoustic guitar (9, 10), synthesizer (1, 10), harmonica (6)
- Jimmy Ripp (1–6, 8, 10–12), Vernon Reid (1), Albert Collins (6), Vivian Campbell (7), Malcolm Bruce (12) – guitar
- Paul Barrere – slide guitar (4)
- Allan Holdsworth – guitar (7), SynthAxe (10)
- Bernie Worrell – piano (2), keyboards (3), Melodica (11), Hammond organ (4, 5, 12), synth (2), Clavinet (12), backing vocals (2, 8, 9)
- Nicky Hopkins (6), Jonas Bruce (9) – piano
- Dougie Bowne (1–4, 6, 9–12), Ginger Baker (5,7), Tony Williams (8) – drums
- Mark Nauseef – Ghanaian drums (2, 8–10), percussion (2, 5, 9)
- Zakir Hussain – tablas (8, 11)
- Steve Jordan – percussion (2)
- The Savage Horns – John Abernathy – saxophone (4, 8, 9)
- Gary "Bone" Cooper – backing vocals (2, 8, 9, 12)
- The Golden Gate Boys Choir, The SoMa Footlights Chorus – choir
