= Things We Like =

1970 instrumental jazz album by Jack Bruce

Studio album by Jack Bruce
- Released: 1970 (UK), 1971 (US)
- Recorded: August 1968
- Studios: IBC, London
- Genre: Jazz
- Length: 42:44 (original LP release); 48:04 (2003 CD reissue)
- Labels: Atco (initial US release, SD 33-349); Polydor
- Producer: Jack Bruce

Jack Bruce chronology
Songs for a Tailor (1969)	Things We Like (1970)	Harmony Row (1971)

Professional ratings
Review scores
Source	Rating
AllMusic	4/5 stars
Christgau's Record Guide	B+

Things We Like is an instrumental jazz album by Scottish musician Jack Bruce.

The album was Bruce's second solo album to be released (in late 1970 in the U.K.; early 1971 in the U.S.) but first to be recorded, in August 1968, while he was still a member of the rock power trio Cream.

Things We Like is Bruce's only instrumental album, mostly containing tunes that Bruce claims to have composed in 1955, when he was twelve years of age. The album also prominently features Bruce's technique on the double bass, an instrument he rarely otherwise recorded with.

Whereas most of Bruce's prior recorded work was in the rock or blues music genres, Things We Like is a jazz album, in particular drawing from 1950s bebop and 1960s free jazz influences. The album did not chart upon its release.

Bruce had previously worked with two of his backing musicians on Things We Like –guitarist John McLaughlin and saxophonist Dick Heckstall-Smith– during his tenures, with Ginger Baker, in the Graham Bond Quartet and Graham Bond Organisation respectively, prior to joining Cream. (In particular, the Graham Bond Quartet, including Bruce and McLaughlin, produced a live recording of Things We Like's "HCKHH Blues", under the title "Ho Ho Country Kickin' Blues", in 1963; this track appears on the 1970 Graham Bond compilation album Solid Bond.) Bond's band was also Bruce's connection to drummer Jon Hiseman, who joined that band after Bruce's departure. Bruce would subsequently work again with McLaughlin in the Tony Williams Lifetime, and completed his last tour with Lifetime in the UK in late 1970, at about the time Things We Like was released there.

The track "Ageing Jack Bruce, Three, from Scotland, England" was recorded during the album's sessions but omitted from the album due to the length restrictions of the LP.

The original album featured a stereo mix with the drums in the right channel only. Both mono and stereo versions were issued as promotional albums to US radio stations in 1971, however, the mono version has not been commercially issued. The 1988 US Polydor CD release was a stereo remix version with the drums centered, and bass and sax in the left and right channels. The 2003 CD re-issue features the original stereo mix.

== Track listing ==
All compositions by Jack Bruce, unless otherwise noted.

Side one
1. "Over the Cliff" – 2:56
2. "Statues" – 7:35
3. "Sam Enchanted Dick" – 7:28

a. "Sam Sack" (Milt Jackson)
b. "Rill's Thrills" (Dick Heckstall-Smith)

4. "Born to be Blue" (Mel Tormé, Robert Wells) – 4:26

Side two
1. "HCKHH Blues" – 8:54
2. "Ballad for Arthur" – 7:42
3. "Things We Like" – 3:38

Bonus track on 2003 CD reissue (Polydor)
8. "Ageing Jack Bruce, Three, from Scotland, England" (Heckstall-Smith) – 5:20

== Personnel ==
- Jack Bruce – double bass, session leader
- Dick Heckstall-Smith – soprano saxophone, tenor saxophone
- John McLaughlin – guitar (tracks 3–8)
- Jon Hiseman – drums

== Production ==
Arranged and produced by Jack Bruce. Recorded at I.B.C. Studios, London, August 1968.
