= More Jack than God =

Studio album by Jack Bruce
- Released: 5 August 2003
- Recorded: 2002 – 2003
- Genres: Prog rock, jazz-rock, blues-rock
- Label: Sanctuary
- Producers: Jack Bruce, Kip Hanrahan

Jack Bruce chronology
Shadows in the Air (2001)	More Jack than God (2003)	Silver Rails (2014)

Professional ratings
Review scores
Source	Rating
Allmusic	4.5/5 stars

More Jack than God is the thirteenth studio album by Scottish musician Jack Bruce, released in August 2003. It was the second of two Bruce albums to be co-produced by Kip Hanrahan.

== Track listing ==
1. "So They Invented Race" (Bruce, Kip Hanrahan) – 6:17
2. "Follow the Fire" (Pete Brown, Bruce) – 4:22
3. "Kelly's Blues" (Brown, Bruce) – 5:29
4. "We're Going Wrong" (Bruce) – 5:14
5. "Bizniz" (Brown, Bruce) – 4:53
6. "Progress" (Brown, Bruce) – 2:35
7. "I Feel Free" (Brown, Bruce) – 3:44
8. "Ricin (Daylight Gathering)" (Bruce, Hanrahan) – 3:45
9. "The Night That Once Was Mine" (Brown, Bruce) – 3:55
10. "Milonga Too" (Bruce, Hanrahan) – 3:24
11. "Cold Island (For Cozy Powell)" (Brown, Bruce) – 4:57
12. "Uh, Oh!" (Bruce, Hanrahan) – 4:36
13. "Politician" (Brown, Bruce) – 5:53
14. "Lost in the City" (Jam Mix) (Bruce, Hanrahan) – 7:17

== Personnel ==
Musicians

- Jack Bruce – vocals, bass, bass pedals, drums, acoustic guitar, piano, synthesizer, Hammond organ
- Robby Ameen – drums
- Malcolm Bruce – guitar, piano
- Richie Flores – conga, vocals
- Horacio "El Negro" Hernández – drums, vocals
- Vernon Reid – electric guitar
- Godfrey Townsend – acoustic guitar
- Bernie Worrell – Hammond organ, vocals

Production

- Jack Bruce – composer, arranger, producer
- Kip Hanrahan – composer, producer
- Pete Brown – lyricist
- Jeff Hoffman – assistant
- Dick Kondas – engineer
- Jon Fausty – engineer, mixing
- Greg Calbi – mastering
- Bill Smith – art direction
- Michele Turriani – photography
- Margrit Seyffer – executive producer
