= Eggy Ley =

British jazz musician (1928–1995)

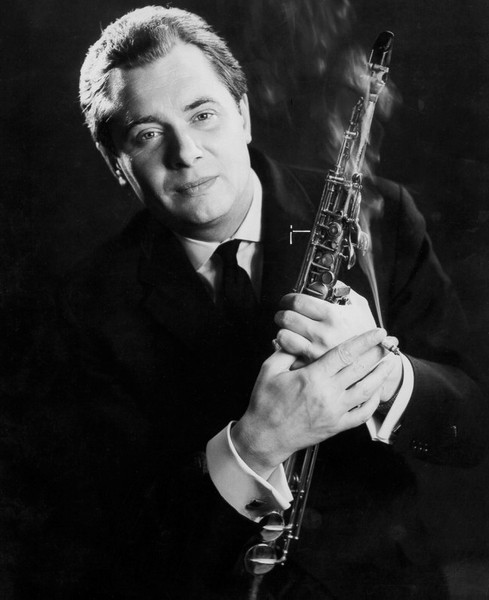
- Ley in 1959

Background information
- Born: Derek William Ley; 4 November 1928; London, England
- Died: 20 December 1995 (aged 67) Delta, British Columbia
- Genre: Jazz
- Occupations: Musician • radio producer
- Instruments: Alto saxophone, soprano saxophone, vocals
- Years active: 1952–1995

Derek William "Eggy" Ley (4 November 1928 – 20 December 1995) was a British jazz musician known for his work with soprano and alto saxophones, as well as for his vocals and his career as a radio producer.

== Biography ==
Ley was born in London, England, and started out life as a drummer and a boogie-woogie pianist when he was 13 years old. He later took up the soprano saxophone and started to play professionally by the early 1950s during his military service in the Royal Air Force. He played with Mick Colliers' Chicago Rhythm Kings (1952), Eric Silk (1953) and Stan Sowden (1955). He then founded his own traditional jazz band, which in August 1955 received a long residency at the New Orleans Bar in Hamburg. Until 1962, he remained with his band performing in different locations in Germany and Scandinavia, recording several records, also with Benny Waters, for different labels, of which the Blues for St. Pauli became a hit in Germany. He played regularly with his band in London, but also produced for Radio Luxembourg. Between 1969 and 1983, he produced for the British Forces Broadcasting Service. During the 1970s, he co-directed the band Jazz Legend with Hugh Rainey. He also recorded with Cy Laurie. In 1982, he founded his band Hot Shots, ran the Jazzin' Around newspaper and also toured abroad before migrating to Canada in the late 1980s. He died in Delta, British Columbia, Canada following a heart attack.He had a son, the electronic music artist, audio engineer, and jazz trombone performer Martin Ley.

== Sources ==
- Ian Carr, Digby Fairweather, Brian Priestley The Rough Guide to Jazz. Rough Guide, London, 2004, ISBN 978-1843532569
- John Chilton Who's Who of British Jazz, Continuum, London 2004 (2nd Edition)
- Discography Discogs Retrieved 21 May 2020
