= John Picard (musician) =

English jazz trombonist (born 1934)

- Born: John Picard; 17 May 1934 (age 92); Tottenham, London, England
- Genre: Jazz
- Occupation: Musician
- Instrument: Trombone
- Years active: 1954–present

John Francis Picard (born 17 May 1934 in Tottenham, London, England) is an English jazz trombonist.

== Biography ==
Picard starting learning music in 1941 by taking lessons on the piano when aged seven years old. After serving in the RAF, during which he played at weekends with Cy Laurie, he spent a further four months with Laurie before joining Humphrey Lyttelton, from 1954 until 1961. From 1962 to the early 1970s, he worked with Tony Coe as well as co-leading a quintet with Kathy Stobart in the late 1960s. From 1975 to 1973, he was a member of the London Jazz Big Band, led by Stan Greig.

During the early 1980s, with his friends Ian Stewart, Colin Smith and Dick Morrissey, he was a founding member of Rocket 88, and later went on to join the Charlie Watts Big Band.

Picard's son is tenor saxophonist Simon Picard.

== Bibliography ==
- John Chilton, Who’s Who of British Jazz. Continuum International Publishing Group, 2004 (ISBN 0826472346)
