= Somethin Els =

Studio album by Jack Bruce
- Released: 23 February 1993
- Recorded: 1986–1992
- Genres: Rock; jazz-rock; blues-rock; electronica
- Length: 40:49
- Label: CMP Records
- Producers: Jack Bruce, with Kurt Renker & Walter Quintus

Jack Bruce chronology
| A Question of Time (1989) | Somethin Els (1993) | Monkjack (1995) |

Somethin Els is the tenth studio album by Scottish musician Jack Bruce. The album was released on 23 February 1993 by CMP Records. It features the first appearance of Bruce's old Cream bandmate Eric Clapton on one of his solo albums.

== Track listing ==
All tracks composed by Jack Bruce and Pete Brown, except where indicated.

| No. | Title | Writer(s) | Length |
|---|---|---|---|
| 1. | "Waiting on a Word" | | 3:52 |
| 2. | "Willpower" | | 4:26 |
| 3. | "Ships in the Night" | | 5:20 |
| 4. | "Peaces of the East" | | 4:55 |
| 5. | "Close Enough for Love" | Jack Bruce | 5:51 |
| 6. | "G.B. Dawn Blues" | | 2:41 |
| 7. | "Criminality" | | 5:05 |
| 8. | "Childsong" | Bruce, Pete Brown, Tony Hymas | 5:06 |
| 9. | "FM" | Bruce | 3:33 |

== Personnel ==
- Jack Bruce - vocals, bass, keyboards, cello, drums, percussion
- Eric Clapton, Clem Clempson, Peter Weihe, Ray Gomez - guitar
- Stuart Elliott, Anton Fier - drums
- Trilok Gurtu, Mark Nauseef - percussion
- Dave Liebman, Dick Heckstall-Smith, Uli Lask, Gerd Dudek - saxophone
- Bruce Fowler - trombone
- Walt Fowler - trumpet
- Maggie Reilly - backing vocals
