= Monkjack =

Studio album by Jack Bruce
- Released: 10 October 1995
- Genre: Jazz; blues
- Length: 51:25
- Label: CMP Records
- Producer: Jack Bruce, with Kurt Renker & Walter Quintus

Jack Bruce chronology
Somethin Els (1993)	Monkjack (1995)	Shadows in the Air (2001)

Monkjack is the eleventh studio album by Scottish musician Jack Bruce, released on 10 October 1995 by CMP Records. The album is unique in his catalogue in that he only sings and plays piano, and is joined only by former P-Funk organist Bernie Worrell. It features a re-working of the song "Weird of Hermiston" from his 1969 debut solo album Songs for a Tailor.

== Track listing ==
All tracks composed by Jack Bruce and Pete Brown; except where indicated

No.	Title	Writer(s)	Length
1.	"The Food"	Jack Bruce, Kip Hanrahan	4:07
2.	"The Boy"	Bruce, David Hart	3:52
3.	"Shouldn't We"	Bruce	2:56
4.	"David's Harp"	Bruce, Hanrahan	3:50
5.	"Time Repairs"		3:32
6.	"Laughing on Music Street"		7:55
7.	"Know One Blues"	Bruce	2:15
8.	"Folksong"		5:16
9.	"Weird of Hermiston"		3:20
10.	"Tightrope"	Bruce, Hart	5:39
11.	"Third Degree"	Willie Dixon, Eddie Boyd	3:34
12.	"Immortal Ninth"	Bruce	5:08

== Personnel ==
- Jack Bruce - vocals, piano
- Bernie Worrell - Hammond B3 organ
