= Shadows in the Air =

Studio album by Jack Bruce
- Released: 10 July 2001
- Recorded: November 1999 – December 2000
- Genre: jazz-rock; blues rock
- Label: Sanctuary
- Producer: Jack Bruce, Kip Hanrahan

Jack Bruce chronology
Monkjack (1995)	Shadows in the Air (2001)	More Jack than God (2003)

Professional ratings
Review scores
Source	Rating
All About Jazz	(favourable)
AllMusic	2.5/5 stars
The Encyclopedia of Popular Music	4/5 stars
Rolling Stone	(not rated)

Shadows in the Air is the twelfth studio album by Scottish musician Jack Bruce, released in March 2001. It was the first of two Bruce albums to be co-produced by Kip Hanrahan. It includes his former bandmate Eric Clapton on fresh recordings of two old Cream songs.

== Track listing ==
1. "Out into the Fields" (Pete Brown, Bruce, Corky Laing, Leslie West) – 5:22
2. "52nd Street" (Bruce, Kip Hanrahan) – 3:59
3. "Heart Quake" (Brown, Bruce) – 5:31
4. "Boston Ball Game 1967" (Brown, Bruce) – 2:01
5. "This Anger's a Liar" (Bruce, Hanrahan) – 3:21
6. "Sunshine of Your Love" (Brown, Bruce, Eric Clapton) – 4:31
7. "Directions Home" (Bruce, Hanrahan) – 4:30
8. "Milonga" (Bruce, Hanrahan) – 4:53
9. "Dancing on Air" (Brown, Bruce) – 4:02
10. "Windowless Rooms" (Bruce, Hanrahan) – 5:08
11. "Dark Heart" (Bruce, Hanrahan) – 5:59
12. "Mr. Flesh" (Bruce, Hanrahan, Vernon Reid) – 2:13
13. "He the Richmond" (Brown, Bruce) – 3:19
14. "White Room" (Brown, Bruce) – 5:48
15. "Surge" (Bruce, Hanrahan) – 1:58

== Personnel ==
Musicians

- Jack Bruce – vocals, bass, acoustic guitar, piano, Vox organ
- Robby Ameen – drums
- Malcolm Bruce – guitar, synthesizer
- Milton Cardona – conga
- Eric Clapton – guitar, vocals, Vox organ
- Dr. John – organ, piano
- Richie Flores – conga
- Andy González – bass
- Jimmy McDonald – accordion
- Gary Moore – guitar
- Vernon Reid – guitar
- Mario Rivera – tenor saxophone
- Piro Rodriguez – trumpet
- Alfredo Triff – violin
- Papo Vasquez – trombone

Production

- Jack Bruce – composer, arranger, producer
- Kip Hanrahan – composer, producer
- Pete Brown – lyricist
- Dick Kondas – engineer
- Jon Fausty – engineer, mixing
- Greg Calbi – mastering
- David Scheinmann – photography
- Mark Saxon – associate producer
- Margrit Seyffer – executive producer
