= Thousands on a Raft =

Studio album by Pete Brown and Piblokto!
- Released: October 1970
- Genre: Rock
- Label: Harvest
- Producer: Pete Brown

Pete Brown and Piblokto! chronology
Things May Come and Things May Go but the Art School Dance Goes on Forever (1970)	Thousands on a Raft (1970)

Thousands on a Raft is the second album by Pete Brown and Piblokto!, released in 1970 on Harvest Records.

== Background ==
The album was the second one on which Brown and guitarist Jim Mullen collaborated. The album was the first to be released in the US in January 1972 on Blue Horizon.

== Cover ==
The album cover shows models of the Mauretania and Concorde stuck into a puddle of water along with beans on toast.

== Track listing ==
All tracks are written by Pete Brown and Jim Mullen, except where indicated.

Side one
No.	Title	Writer(s)	Length
1.	"Aeroplane Head Woman"		6:44
2.	"Station Song Platform Two"		3:43
3.	"Highland Song"	Mullen	17:04

Side two
No.	Title	Writer(s)	Length
4.	"If They Could Only See Me Now, Parts 1–2"	Mullen	12:07
5.	"Got a Letter from a Computer"		5:51
6.	"Thousands on a Raft"		7:07

== Personnel ==
- Pete Brown – vocals, talking drum, conga
- Jim Mullen – guitar, bass guitar on "Station Song Platform Two", percussion
- Dave Thompson – keyboards, soprano saxophone, Mellotron on "Station Song Platform Two", percussion
- Steve Glover – bass guitar, percussion
- Rob Tait – drums, percussion
