= Colin Smith (musician) =

English jazz trumpeter (1934–2004)

- Born: Colin Ranger Smith; 20 November 1934; London, England
- Died: 29 March 2004 (aged 69) London, England
- Genres: Jazz; Trad Jazz
- Occupation: Musician
- Instrument: Trumpet
- Years active: 1957–2004

Colin Ranger Smith (20 November 1934 – 29 March 2004) was an English jazz trumpeter.

== Biography ==
Born in London, he joined the Terry Lightfoot band in 1957 before moving on to playing with Cy Laurie, in 1958. His long tenure in the Acker Bilk band began in 1959, taking a break in 1966 to sail across the Atlantic in a 45-foot ketch. Rejoining Bilk in 1968, he worked at the same time in the band led by the saxophonist Tony Coe and the trombonist John Picard, and with Stan Greig's London Jazz Big Band.

In 1977, together with Picard, Ian "Stu" Stewart, Dick Morrissey and Charlie Watts, he played in the Bob Hall/George Green Boogie Woogie Band, an ad hoc band which would eventually become known as Rocket 88.

Other big bands he played with included those led by the American clarinettist Bob Wilber, and later the one led by Charlie Watts and the revisionist Midnite Follies Orchestra, Stan Greig's Boogie Band and Brian Leake's Sweet and Sour. From 1983 he played with the Pizza Express All Stars and, in 1992, returned to playing with Bilk.
