= Jack Bruce =

Scottish musician (1943–2014)

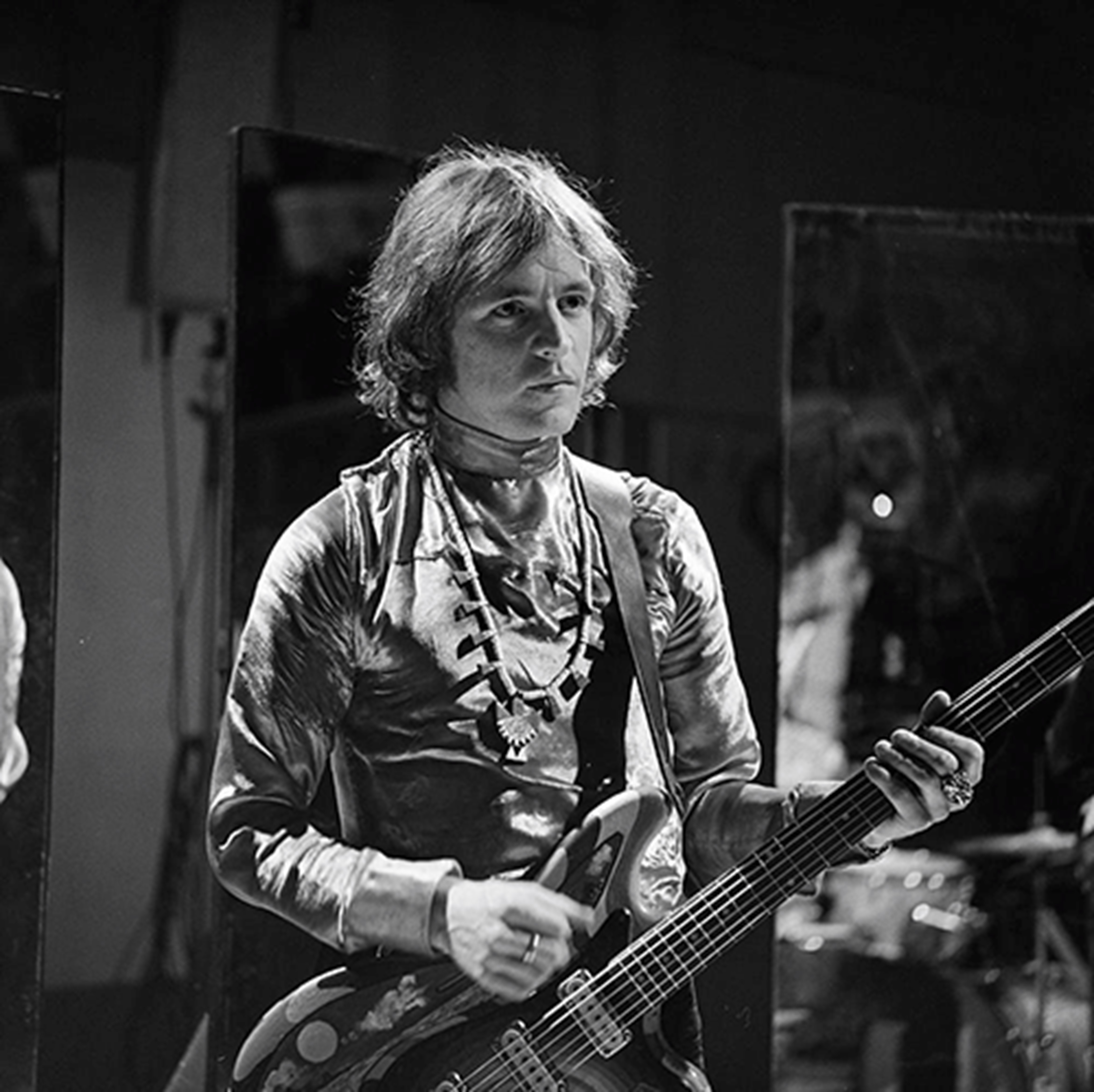
- Bruce with Cream on Fanclub, 1968
- Born: John Symon Asher Bruce; 14 May 1943; Bishopbriggs, Lanarkshire, Scotland
- Died: 25 October 2014 (aged 71); Sudbury, Suffolk, England
- Education: Royal Conservatoire of Scotland
- Occupations: Musician; singer; songwriter; composer; producer
- Years active: 1962–2014
- Spouses: Janet Godfrey (m. 1964; div. 1981) Margrit Seyffer (m. 1982)
- Children: 5, including Natascha
- Parent(s): Charlie Bruce, Betty Asher
- Musical career
- Genres: Rock; blues rock; jazz rock
- Instruments: Bass; vocals; guitar; keyboards; cello; harmonica
- Labels: Polydor; Atco; RSO; Epic; Sanctuary; Esoteric
- Formerly of: Cream; The Graham Bond Organisation; John Mayall & the Bluesbreakers; Blues Incorporated; Manfred Mann; The Tony Williams Lifetime; West, Bruce and Laing; Rocket 88; Soft Machine; BBM; Ringo Starr & His All-Starr Band; Spectrum Road
- Website: jackbruce.com

John Symon Asher "Jack" Bruce (14 May 1943 – 25 October 2014) was a Scottish musician. He gained popularity as the primary lead vocalist and bassist of rock band Cream. After the group disbanded in 1968, he pursued a solo career and also played with several bands.

In the early 1960s, Bruce joined the Graham Bond Organisation (GBO), where he met future Cream bandmate Ginger Baker. After leaving the band, he briefly joined John Mayall & the Bluesbreakers, where he met Eric Clapton. In 1966, after a short time with Manfred Mann, Bruce formed Cream with lead guitarist Clapton and drummer Baker. Bruce co-wrote many of their songs (including "Sunshine of Your Love", "White Room" and "I Feel Free") with poet/lyricist Pete Brown.

After the group disbanded in the late 1960s, Bruce began recording solo albums. He put together a band of his own to perform material live and formed the blues rock band West, Bruce and Laing in 1972, with ex-Mountain guitarist Leslie West and drummer Corky Laing. Bruce's solo career spanned several decades. From the 1970s to the 1990s, he played with several bands as a touring member. He reunited with Cream in 2005 for concerts at the Royal Albert Hall and at Madison Square Garden in New York.

Bruce is considered one of the most important and influential bassists of all time. Rolling Stone magazine readers ranked him number eight on their list of "10 Greatest Bassists of All Time". He was inducted in the Rock and Roll Hall of Fame in 1993, and was awarded the Grammy Lifetime Achievement Award in 2006, both as a member of Cream.

== Life and career ==
=== 1943–1962: Early life ===
Bruce was born on 14 May 1943 in Bishopbriggs, Lanarkshire, Scotland, to Betty (née Asher) and Charlie Bruce, musical parents who moved frequently, resulting in the young Bruce attending 14 different schools, ending up at Bellahouston Academy. He began playing jazz bass in his teens and won a scholarship to study cello and musical composition at the Royal Scottish Academy of Music and Drama while playing in Jim McHarg's Scotsville Jazzband to support himself.

=== 1962–1966: Early career ===
Jack Bruce's school disapproved of the fact that he played in jazz combos, so he was forced to leave the school. He subsequently toured Italy, playing double bass with the Murray Campbell Big Band.

In 1962, Bruce became a member of the London-based band Blues Incorporated, led by Alexis Korner, in which he played the upright bass. The band - which became the resident house band at the newly opened Ealing Jazz Club - also included organist Graham Bond, saxophonist Dick Heckstall-Smith and drummer Ginger Baker. In 1963 the group dissolved.

In March 1963, Bruce played in the Johnny Burch Octet. Bruce would go on to form the Graham Bond Quartet with Bond, Baker and guitarist John McLaughlin. They played an eclectic range of music genres, including bebop, blues and rhythm and blues. As a result of session work, Bruce switched from the upright bass to the electric bass guitar. The move to electric bass happened as McLaughlin left the band. He was replaced by Heckstall-Smith on saxophone, and the band pursued a more concise R&B sound and changed their name to the Graham Bond Organisation. The group released two studio albums and several singles but were not commercially successful.

During the time that Bruce and Baker played with the Graham Bond Organisation, they were known for their hostility towards each other. There were numerous stories of the two sabotaging each other's equipment and fighting on stage. Relations grew so bad between the two that Bruce left the band in August 1965.

After leaving, Bruce recorded a solo single, "I'm Gettin Tired", for Polydor Records. He joined John Mayall and his Bluesbreakers band, which featured guitarist Eric Clapton. Bruce's stay in the band was brief, and he did not contribute to any releases at the time, but recordings featuring him were later released, initially on Looking Back and Primal Solos.

After the Bluesbreakers, Bruce had his first commercial success as a member of Manfred Mann in 1966, including "Pretty Flamingo", which reached number one in the UK singles chart (one of two number one records of his career – the other being an uncredited bass part on The Scaffold's "Lily the Pink") as well as the freewheeling and groundbreaking jazz rock of Instrumental Asylum. When interviewed on the edition of the VH1 show Classic Albums which featured Disraeli Gears, Mayall said that Bruce had been lured away by the lucrative commercial success of Manfred Mann, while Mann himself recalled that Bruce played his first gig with the band without any rehearsal, playing the songs straight through without error, commenting that perhaps the chord changes seemed obvious to Bruce.

While with Manfred Mann, Bruce again collaborated with Clapton as a member of Powerhouse, which also featured Spencer Davis Group members Steve Winwood credited as "Steve Anglo", on vocals and Pete York on drums (Apparently, Ginger Baker was originally to have played the session), Ben Palmer on piano, and Manfred Mann vocalist Paul Jones on harmonica. Three tracks were featured on the Elektra sampler album What's Shakin'. Two of the songs, "Crossroads" and "Steppin' Out", became staples in the live set of his next band, Cream.

=== 1966–1968: Cream ===
In July 1966, Bruce, Eric Clapton and Ginger Baker founded the power trio Cream, which gained international recognition playing blues-rock and jazz-inflected rock music. Bruce either penned or co-penned the majority of the band's tunes and sang most of the lead vocals, with Clapton backing him up and eventually assuming some leads himself.

With his Gibson EB-3 or Fender VI electric basses, Bruce became one of the most famous bassists in rock, winning musicians' polls and influencing the next generation of bassists such as Sting, Jim Shaw, Geddy Lee, Geezer Butler and Jeff Berlin. Bruce co-wrote most of Cream's single releases with lyricist Pete Brown, including the hits "Sunshine of Your Love", "White Room" and "I Feel Free". Cream broke up in 1968.

=== 1970s: Post-Cream ===
Collaborative efforts with musicians, in many genres – hard rock, jazz, blues, R&B, fusion, avant-garde, world music, third stream classical – continued as a theme of Bruce's career. Alongside these he produced a long line of highly regarded solo albums. In contrast to his collaborative works, the solo albums usually maintain a common theme: melodic songs with a complex musical structure, songs with lyrics frequently penned by Pete Brown and a core band of world-class musicians. This structure was loosened on his live solo albums and DVDs, where extended improvisations similar to those employed by Cream in live performance were sometimes still used.

In August 1968, before Cream officially disbanded, Bruce recorded a semi-acoustic free jazz album with John McLaughlin, Dick Heckstall-Smith and Jon Hiseman. This was issued in 1970 as Bruce's second solo album, Things We Like. The album was a precursor to the jazz fusion boom in the early 1970s.

Bruce's first solo release, Songs for a Tailor, was issued in September 1969; it too featured Heckstall-Smith and Hiseman. It was a worldwide hit and also showcased Jack's ability as a gifted pianist, but after a brief supporting tour backed by Larry Coryell and Mitch Mitchell, Bruce joined the jazz fusion group Lifetime, with drummer Tony Williams, guitarist McLaughlin, and organist Larry Young, for its second album, Turn It Over (1970). For the group's third album, Ego (1971), Ron Carter replaced Bruce on bass, but Bruce contributed a guest vocal. Bruce then recorded his third solo album Harmony Row, but this was not as commercially successful as Songs for a Tailor. The song "The Consul at Sunset" from Harmony Row, inspired by the 1947 Malcolm Lowry novel Under the Volcano, was released as a single in 1971 (Polydor 2058–153, b/w "A Letter of Thanks"), but did not chart.

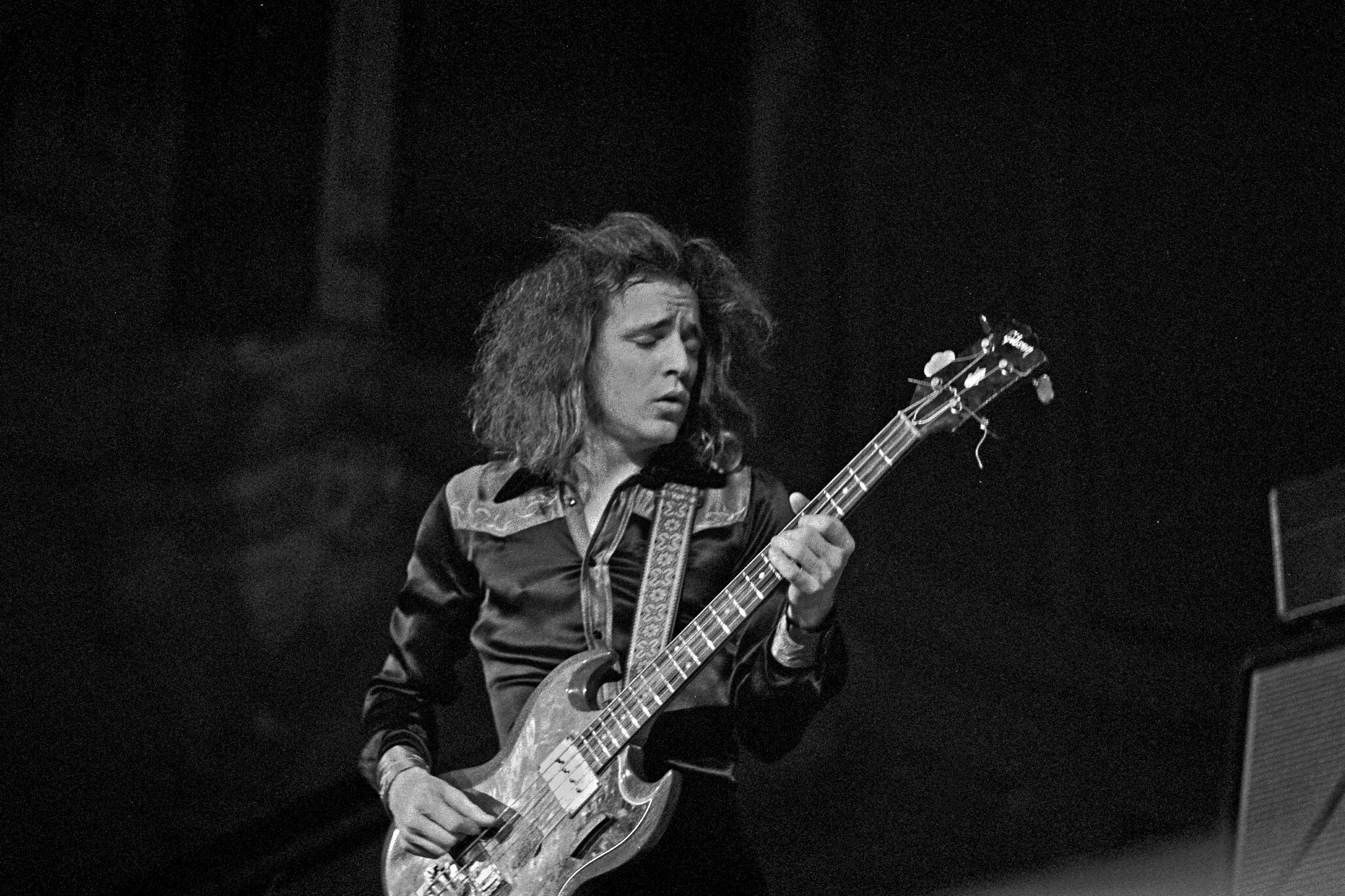
Bruce performing in Hamburg, January 1972.

In 1972 Bruce formed a blues rock power trio, West, Bruce & Laing. Besides Bruce, the group included singer/guitarist Leslie West and drummer Corky Laing, both formerly of the Cream-influenced American band Mountain. West, Bruce & Laing produced two studio albums, Why Dontcha and Whatever Turns You On, and one live album, Live 'n' Kickin'. Bruce also jammed with Syd Barrett at an informal jazz and poetry performance with Pete Brown in Cambridge in October 1973.

The band's breakup was announced shortly before Live 'n' Kickin's release in early 1974, and Bruce released his fourth solo album Out of the Storm later that year. Also in 1974 he featured on the title track of Frank Zappa's album Apostrophe ('), recorded in November 1972. Bruce was credited with bass and co-authorship on the improvised track. When asked about Zappa in a 1992 interview, Bruce tried to change the subject and jokingly insisted that he had played only cello parts. Outtakes from the session were released on the archival release The Crux Of The Biscuit in 2016. In 1973 Bruce recorded bass guitar for Lou Reed's Berlin album, playing on all but two tracks.

A 1975 tour was lined up to support the Out of the Storm album with a band featuring former Rolling Stones guitarist Mick Taylor and jazz keyboard player Carla Bley, with whom he had collaborated in 1971 on Escalator over the Hill. The tour was belatedly documented on Live at Manchester Free Trade Hall '75 (2003), but it ended with Taylor's departure, and sessions for a studio album were abandoned. During the next year, Bruce only resurfaced to play on Charlie Mariano's Helen 12 Trees album.

In 1976, Bruce formed a new band (The Jack Bruce Band) with drummer Simon Phillips and keyboardist Tony Hymas. The group recorded an album, called How's Tricks. A world tour followed, but the album was a commercial failure. The follow-up album, Jet Set Jewel, was rejected at the time by Bruce's record label RSO as not being marketable, and RSO ultimately dropped Bruce from their roster. In 1979 he toured with members from the Mahavishnu Orchestra, reuniting him with John McLaughlin, and introducing him to drummer Billy Cobham. A 3-CD collection of his 1970s BBC recordings titled Spirit was released in 2008.

In the late 1970s, Bruce also joined up to play with friends from his Alexis Korner days in Rocket 88, the back-to-the-roots band that Ian Stewart had arranged, and Bruce appears on the album of the same name, recorded live in Germany in 1979 and released in 1981. They also recorded a "live in the studio" album called Blues & Boogie Explosion for the German audiophile record label Jeton.

=== 1980s ===
By 1979, Bruce's drug habit had reached such a level that he had lost most of his money. Bruce contributed as a session musician to recordings by Cozy Powell, Gary Moore, and Jon Anderson to raise money. By 1980 his career was back on track with his new band, Jack Bruce & Friends, consisting of drummer Billy Cobham, guitarist Clem Clempson and keyboardist/guitarist David Sancious. After releasing the album I've Always Wanted to Do This at the end of 1980, they undertook a long tour to support the record, but it was not a commercial success and they disbanded. That year he also collaborated on the Soft Machine album Land of Cockayne (released in 1981).

In 1981, Bruce collaborated with guitarist Robin Trower and released two power trio albums, B.L.T. and Truce, the first of which was a minor hit in the US. He also played for Trevor Rabin on the album Wolf. By 1983, Bruce was no longer contracted to a major record company and released his next solo album, Automatic, on a minor German label, Intercord. A European tour followed to promote the album enlisting Bruce Gary from The Knack (who had also played in Bruce's 1975 band) on drums and Sancious from his 1980 band (Jack Bruce & Friends) on guitar and keyboards. In 1982, Bruce played with a short-lived ensemble A Gathering of Minds, composed of Billy Cobham, Allan Holdsworth, Didier Lockwood, and David Sancious at Montreux. In 1983, Bruce sang on tracks 5 and 6 of the Allan Holdsworth album Road Games.

In 1983, Bruce began working with the Latin/world music producer Kip Hanrahan, and released the collaborative albums Desire Develops an Edge, Vertical's Currency, A Few Short Notes from the End Run, Exotica and All Roads Are Made of the Flesh. They were all critically successful, and in 2001 he went on to form his own band using Hanrahan's famous Afro-Cuban based rhythm section. Other than his partnership with lyricist Pete Brown, Bruce's musical relationship with Hanrahan was the most consistent and long-lasting of his career.

In 1985, he sang lead and played blues harp on the song "Silver Bullet" with Anton Fier's Golden Palominos. It appears on the album Visions of Excess. In 1986, Bruce re-recorded the Cream song "I Feel Free" and released it as a single to support an advertising campaign for the Renault 21 motor car.

In 1989, Bruce secured his first major record deal in a decade with Epic and recorded A Question of Time. This included two tracks with Ginger Baker on drums, their first collaboration since Cream. Baker then joined Bruce's live band and toured the United States at the turn of the decade.

=== 1990s ===
Bruce played at the Montreux Jazz Festival in 1990, and was invited by the Irish blues rock performer Rory Gallagher (who had a long-standing relationship with Bruce, having supported Cream's farewell concert in the band Taste in 1968) to perform a couple of songs together on stage. In 1991 he was one of the supporting musicians for Vivian Stanshall's solo show "Rawlinson Dog-ends", but quit over a lack of adequate rehearsals.

On April 25, 1991, Bruce performed with Uli Jon Roth, Simon Phillips, Randy Hansen, John Wetton, Zeno Roth, and others at E-Werk in Cologne, Germany. This performance featured a tribute to Jimi Hendrix, and a concert video of 22 tracks was released on Laserdisc in 1994 as The Spirit of Jimi Hendrix Live in Concert in Japan.

In 1993, a solo album, Somethin Els, reunited him with Eric Clapton and brought belated but widespread critical acclaim.

Later that year, Ginger Baker and a host of former Bruce band colleagues joined him for two special 50th birthdays concerts in Cologne, Germany, hosted by the TV show Rockpalast. Selections from these were released as the live double CD Cities of the Heart, and much later as the DVD set Rockpalast: The 50th Birthdays Concerts. One special guest was the Irish blues-rock guitarist Gary Moore, who joined Bruce and Baker for a set of Cream classics. Inspired by this performance, the three formed the power trio BBM, and their subsequent (and only) album, Around the Next Dream, was a top ten hit in the UK. However, the old arguments between Bruce and Baker arose again, and the subsequent tour was cut short and the band broke up. A low-key solo album, Monkjack, followed in 1995, featuring Bruce on piano and vocals, accompanied only by the Funkadelic organist Bernie Worrell.

Bruce then began work producing and arranging the soundtrack to the independently produced Scottish film The Slab Boys with Lulu, Edwyn Collins, Eddi Reader, and the Proclaimers. The soundtrack album appeared in 1997. That same year, Bruce returned to touring as a member of Ringo Starr's All-Starr Band, which also featured Peter Frampton on guitar. At the gig in Denver, Colorado, the band was joined onstage by Ginger Baker, and Bruce, Baker and Frampton played a short set of Cream classics. Bruce continued to tour with Starr through 2000.

=== 2000s ===
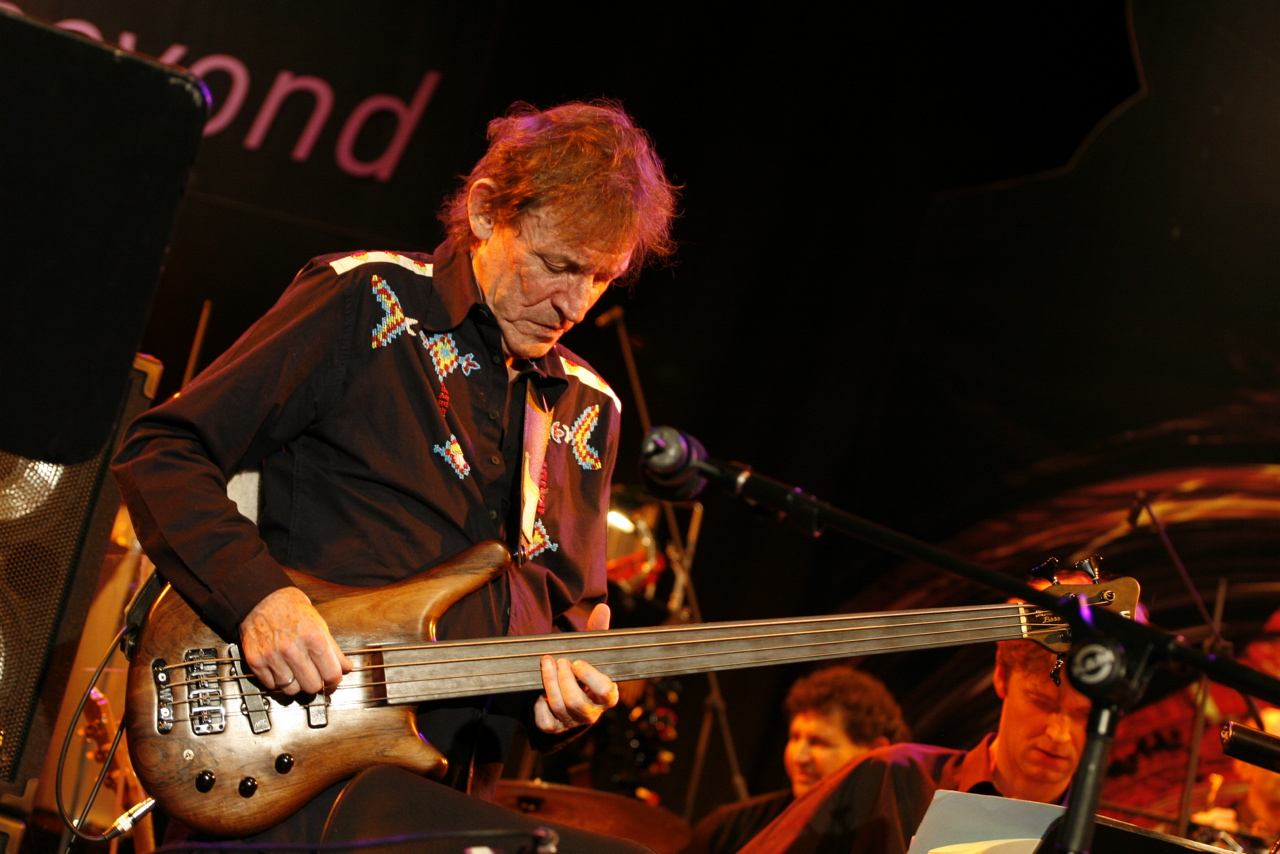
Bruce playing a fretless Warwick Thumb bass guitar at the Jazzfestival in Frankfurt, Germany, on 28 October 2006

In 2001, Bruce reappeared with a band featuring Bernie Worrell, Vernon Reid of Living Colour on guitar, and from Kip Hanrahan's group, Robby Ameen and Horacio "el Negro" Hernandez on drums, and Richie Flores on congas. Hanrahan also produced the accompanying album Shadows in the Air, which included a reunion with Eric Clapton on new versions of the Cream classics "Sunshine of Your Love" and "White Room". The band released another Hanrahan produced studio album, More Jack than God, in 2003 and a live DVD, Live at the Canterbury Fayre.

Bruce had suffered a period of declining health after many years of addictions, which he finally beat with clinical treatment. In 2003, he was diagnosed with liver cancer. In September 2003, he underwent a liver transplant, which was almost fatal, as his body initially rejected the new organ. He recovered, and in 2004 re-appeared to perform "Sunshine of Your Love" at a Rock Legends concert in Germany organised by Leslie Mandoki.

In May 2005, he reunited with former Cream bandmates Clapton and Baker for a series of well-received concerts at London's Royal Albert Hall, released as the album Royal Albert Hall London May 2-3-5-6, 2005, and New York's Madison Square Garden.

In between the UK and U.S. Cream dates, he also played live with Gary Moore and drummer Gary Husband at the Dick Heckstall-Smith tribute concert in London.

Subsequent concert appearances by Bruce were sparse because of recovery after the transplant, but in 2006 he returned to the live arena with a show of Cream and solo classics performed with the German HR (Hessischer Rundfunk) Big Band. This was released on CD in Germany in 2007. In 2007, he made a brief concert appearance to open a new rehearsal hall named in his honour at the Royal Scottish Academy of Music and Drama, Glasgow with Clem Clempson, keyboard player Ronnie Leahy, and Husband.

In 2008, Bruce collaborated again with guitarist Robin Trower on the album Seven Moons. It also featured Husband.

In May 2008, Bruce turned 65 years old; to commemorate this milestone two box sets of recordings were released. Spirit is a three-CD collection of Bruce's BBC recordings from the 1970s. Can You Follow? is a six-CD retrospective anthology released by the Esoteric label in the UK. This anthology is a wide-ranging collection covering his music from 1963 to 2003 and, aside from his work with Kip Hanrahan, is a comprehensive overview of his career.

Improved health led to Bruce playing a series of live outdoor concerts across the US starting in July 2008 as part of the Hippiefest Tour. He was supported by members of the late Who bassist John Entwistle's the John Entwistle Band, and headlined at a tribute concert to the bassist.

In November 2008, Bruce recorded a concert in Birmingham, England, for Radio Broadcast with the BBC Big Band, where he again played the Big Band arrangements of his classic songs. In December, he was reunited with Ginger Baker at the drummer's Lifetime Achievement Award concert in London. They played jazz classics with saxophonist Courtney Pine and for the first time in 40 years played the Graham Bond–Cream classic "Traintime".

The same month, Bruce, with guitarist Vernon Reid, drummer Cindy Blackman, and organist John Medeski played a series of Blue Note Club tribute concerts to the Tony Williams Lifetime in Japan. These shows were broadcast in high definition on television in Japan.

In 2009, Bruce performed in a series of concerts with Trower and Husband in Europe. Proposed dates in the U.S. in April were cancelled because of a further bout of ill health. Bruce recovered, and the band played summer concerts in Italy, Norway, and the UK during 2009. This promoted the release of the Seven Moons live CD and DVD, recorded in February during the European leg of the tour in Nijmegen, Netherlands.

During the Scottish dates of the 2009 tour, Bruce was presented with an Honorary Doctorate of Letters from Glasgow Caledonian University for services to the culture of Glasgow and music in general.

In August 2009, the 1983 Bruce solo album Automatic was re-released, making his entire solo catalogue available on CD. In addition, all of the discs up to and including How's Tricks contain previously unreleased material.

In October 2009, Bruce performed at the 50th anniversary of Ronnie Scott's Club with the Ronnie Scott's Blues Band.

=== 2010s ===
Jack Bruce – Composing Himself: The Authorized Biography by Harry Shapiro was released by Jawbone Press in February 2010. Shapiro had previously written biographies of Bruce collaborators Alexis Korner, Graham Bond and Eric Clapton. The book followed memoirs from his Cream bandmates Clapton (Clapton, 2007) and Baker (Hellraiser, 2009). His songwriting partner, Pete Brown's, biography White Rooms & Imaginary Westerns was published in September 2010. They each have differing recollections of forming Cream, playing, and writing together.

On 14 January, at the 2011 North American Music Merchants Show, Bruce became only the third recipient of the International Bassist Award, a lifetime achievement award for bassists, after Jaco Pastorius and Nathan Watts.

His first independent CD release, Live at the Milky Way, Amsterdam 2001, featuring The Cuicoland Express, his Latin-based band of the time, was issued in October 2010. The double album received an official worldwide release, distributed by EMI in February 2011. To support this release Bruce again played four dates in London at Ronnie Scott's Jazz Club with the Ronnie Scott's Blues Experience, followed by a further ten dates across the UK with the band. On 4 June 2011, Bruce played a special concert at the Royal Festival Hall in London, which was celebrating its 60th anniversary. The evening celebrated the 50th anniversary of the blues in Great Britain, and Bruce played with his Big Blues Band and special guest Joe Bonamassa.

In 2012, Bruce started playing the Gerry Rafferty tribute concert in Glasgow, followed by a date with the traditional Celtic band Lau. BBC Scotland recorded a one-hour special on Bruce, which also included a performance with Lau. The completed documentary Jack Bruce – The Man Behind the Bass was transmitted in February 2012 by BBC Scotland. It featured new interviews with Bruce, Clapton, Baker, and Brown. It was transmitted again on 9 November 2014 on BBC2 Scotland and on 17 November 2014 on BBC4 in the UK.

February 2012 saw Bruce playing in Havana, Cuba, along with guitarist Phil Manzanera, supporting the mambo band of Augusto Enriquez. March saw another residency at Ronnie Scott's in London, supported by his Big Blues Band and followed by a UK tour. The concert at the Stables, Milton Keynes on 18 March was planned to be recorded as an Instant Live CD release, but technical issues prevented this. The following evenings' performance at the same location was recorded, and a 2-CD version was issued by Instant Live.

Spectrum Road, a collaboration with Vernon Reid, Cindy Blackman, and John Medeski in tribute to The Tony Williams Lifetime, was released in June 2012 by the US jazz record label Palmetto Records and was accompanied by a series of dates at large jazz festivals in North America and Europe throughout June and July.

In March 2014, Bruce released Silver Rails on the Esoteric Antenna label, his first solo studio album in more than a decade. Silver Rails was recorded at Abbey Road Studios in London, produced and mixed by Rob Cass and features contributions from Cream lyricist, Pete Brown, Kip Hanrahan, and wife Margrit Seyffer as well as musicians Robin Trower, Cindy Blackman, Phil Manzanera, Uli Jon Roth, John Medeski and Bernie Marsden. The deluxe version of the album featured a behind the scenes documentary "The Making of Silver Rails" which was filmed on location at the studios and directed by Bruce's daughter Kyla Simone Bruce. Bruce's son Malcolm Bruce pre-produced the album and played guitar on several tracks, while Bruce's daughter Aruba Red was featured on "Hidden Cities" singing backing vocals.

=== Secondary instruments ===
In addition to his primary instruments, Bruce is known to have played the following instruments during his career:

- Cello – Rope Ladder to the Moon (documentary)
- Guitar
- Harmonica – "Traintime"
- Mellotron – "Silver Rails"
- Organ – Rope Ladder to the Moon
- Piano – "Theme for an Imaginary Western"

== Style and influences ==
Bruce's complex, jazz-influenced playing established him as one of the foremost bassists in rock music. During his time with Cream, he developed his signature style and began to make use of string bending and bass distortion to stand out in the band, becoming prominently associated with the Gibson EB-3 and Marshall amplification. Later, he switched to fretless Warwick basses and developed a cleaner sound utilizing Hartke amplifiers. Uniquely among his contemporaries, Bruce was primarily a fingerstyle player, in contrast to other bassists like Paul McCartney or Noel Redding who mainly relied on using a pick.

Chief among his influences, he has named J.S. Bach, Ray Brown, Charles Mingus, Scott LaFaro, Charlie Haden, Roy Babbington, and James Jamerson.

== Personal life ==
In 1964, Bruce married Janet Godfrey, who had been the secretary of the Graham Bond Organisation fan club and had collaborated with Bruce on two songs written for the band. The couple had two sons together, Jonas (Jo) Bruce, who grew up to play keyboards in his father's band and played with Afro Celt Sound System, and Malcolm Bruce, who grew up to play the guitar with his father and played with Ginger Baker's son, Kofi. Jonas died in 1997 from respiratory problems.

In 1982, he married his second wife, Margrit Seyffer, with whom he had two daughters, Natascha, known professionally as Aruba Red, and Kyla, and a son, Corin.

== Death ==
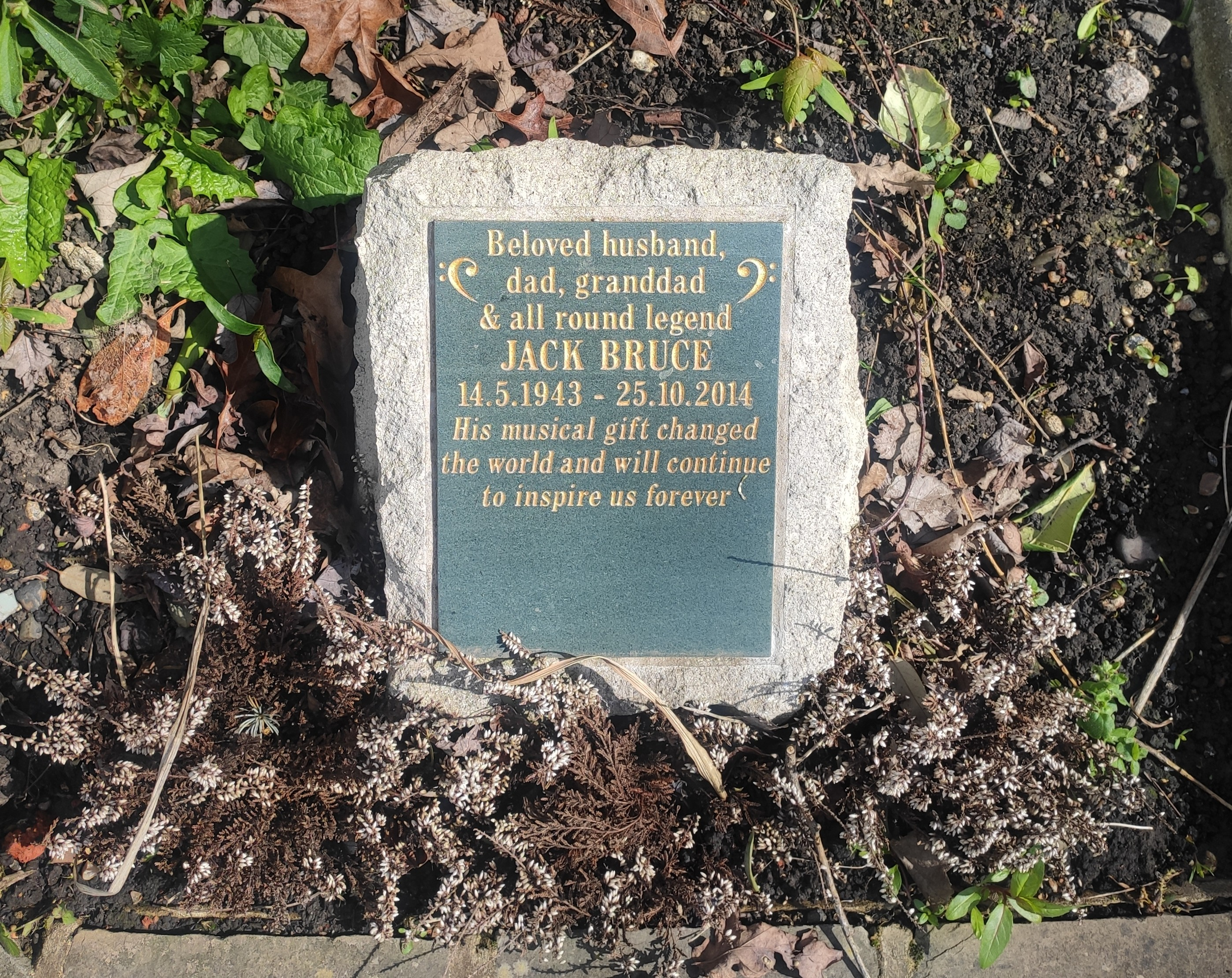
Plaque dedicated to Bruce at Golders Green Crematorium

Bruce died of liver disease on 25 October 2014, in Sudbury, Suffolk, England, aged 71. He was survived by his wife Margrit and four children. Bruce's liver cancer was caused by cross addiction to both heroin and alcohol.

His funeral was held in London on 5 November 2014 and was attended by Clapton, Baker, and noted musicians Phil Manzanera, Gary Brooker, Vernon Reid, and Nitin Sawhney among others. Dozens assembled at the Golders Green Crematorium paying a last tribute singing "Morning Has Broken", "Strawberry Fields Forever", and "Theme for an Imaginary Western". Bruce's remains were later cremated and then interred at a private family ceremony on 31 December 2014 at the crematorium. Despite their well documented volatile relationship, Ginger Baker attended Bruce's funeral, having always respected his talent and musicianship.

== Influence ==
Steve Anderson, writing in The Independent said: "He became one of the most famous and influential bass players in rock." Eric Clapton posted on Facebook about Bruce: "He was a great musician and composer, and a tremendous inspiration to me" and composed an acoustic song in his honour.

Black Sabbath guitarist Tony Iommi said on Twitter that Bruce had been his favourite bass player, saying: "He was a hero to so many". Black Sabbath bassist Geezer Butler regarded Bruce as his "biggest influence and favourite bass player". Rush bassist and singer Geddy Lee wrote: "One of the greatest rock bassists to ever live and a true and profound inspiration to countless musicians. He was one of my first bass heroes and was a major influence on my playing and my music."

Writing in The Sunday Times in 2008, Dan Cairns had suggested: "Many consider him to be one of the greatest bass players of all time." Writing in The Daily Telegraph, Neil McCormick said: "There was a time when Jack Bruce was synonymous with the bass guitar in rock history, when he was widely revered as the best there was on four strings." Roger Waters of Pink Floyd described Bruce as "probably the most musically gifted bass player who's ever been."

Other bassists he has influenced include Chris Squire, John Wetton, Peter Cetera, Jeff Berlin, John Paul Jones, Phil Lesh, John Entwistle, Stanley Clarke, Neil Murray, Roger Glover, Billy Sheehan, and Sting.

== Discography ==
=== Singles ===
- 1965, "I'm Gettin' Tired (Of Drinkin' and Gamblin')", Polydor: BM 56036
- 1971, "The Consul at Sunset" / "A Letter of Thanks", Polydor: 2058 153
- 1974, "Keep It Down", RSO: 2090 141
- 1986, "Feel Free", Virgin: VS 875
- 1995, "Monkjack", CMP Records: CMP CD 1010P
- 1997, "On and On" (Man Doki with Ian Anderson, Nik Kershaw, Jack Bruce, Bobby Kimball, Chaka Khan, Guru and David Clayton-Thomas), Brunswick News: 573 469-2
- 2014, "Fields of Forever", Esoteric / Cherry Red: EANTS 1002

=== Studio albums ===
Date	Title	Charts			Notes
Date	Title	US	CA	UK	Notes
August 1969	Songs for a Tailor	55	70	6	
December 1970	Things We Like	—	—	—	Recorded August 1968
August 1971	Harmony Row	—	—	—	
November 1974	Out of the Storm	160	—	—	
March 1977	How's Tricks	153	—	—	
December 1980	I've Always Wanted to Do This	—	—	—	
January 1983	Automatic	—	—	—	
October 1989	A Question of Time	—	—	—	
March 1993	Somethin Els	—	—	—	
September 1995	Monkjack	—	—	—	
July 2001	Shadows in the Air	—	—	—	
May 2003	Jet Set Jewel	—	—	—	Recorded 1978
September 2003	More Jack than God	—	—	—	
March 2014	Silver Rails	—	—	—	

=== Live albums ===
Recorded	Title	Notes
1971–1978	Spirit (Live at the BBC 1971–1978)	Triple CD box set, omits 1980 shows, released 2008
1 June 1975	Live at Manchester Free Trade Hall '75	Double CD, released 2003
6 June 1975, 8 January 1980	Live on The Old Grey Whistle Test	Mono, 1975 show incomplete, includes 1980 show, released 1998
20 November 1980	Doing This ... On Ice!	Also released as Concert Classics Vol.9, Bird Alone, (A)live in America, etc.
2–3 November 1993	Cities of the Heart	Double CD of the 50th Birthday Concerts, released 1994
20 October 2001	Jack Bruce & The Cuicoland Express: Live at the Milky Way	Double CD, released 2010
26 October 2006	Live with the HR Big Band	Re-released in 2015 with DVD as More Jack Than Blues
18 March 2012	Jack Bruce & His Big Blues Band – Live 2012	Double CD, released 2012

=== Compilations ===
Date	Title	Notes
1972	At His Best	Double LP
1989	Willpower: A Twenty Year Retrospective	CD, double LP
May 2008	Can You Follow?	6-CD box set
October 2015	Sunshine of Your Love – A Life in Music	Double CD

=== DVDs ===
Filmed	Title	Notes
1971	Rope Ladder to the Moon	Documentary directed by Tony Palmer, 55 minutes, released 2010
19 October 1980	Jack Bruce and Friends in Concert	Live at Rockpalast, 105 minutes, released 2002
1980, 1983, 1990	Jack Bruce at Rockpalast	Double DVD, 3 concerts, 283 minutes, released 2005
2–3 November 1993	Rockpalast: The 50th Birthday Concerts	Double DVD + CD (The Lost Tracks), 235 minutes, released 2014
24 August 2002	Live at the Canterbury Fayre	With The Cuicoland Express, 76 minutes, released 2003
26 October 2006	More Jack Than Blues	With the HR Big Band, 83 minutes, released 2015

=== Collaborations ===
Sorted alphabetically by the last name of the leading artist of the recording, respectively the band ("the" omitted), but sortable by date, album title (or first name; f5 to reset).

Date	Leader/band	Album title	Tracks/notes
1983	Mose Allison	Lessons in Living	
1971	Carla Bley	Escalator over the Hill	
1994	Bruce-Baker-Moore (BBM)	Around the Next Dream	
1966	Cream	Fresh Cream	
1967	Cream	Disraeli Gears	
1968	Cream	Wheels of Fire	
1969	Cream	Goodbye	
1970	Cream	Live Cream	
1972	Cream	Live Cream Volume II	
2005	Cream	Royal Albert Hall London May 2-3-5-6, 2005	
1987	Anton Fier and Kenji Suzuki	Inazuma Super Session "Absolute Live!!"	
1970	Michael Gibbs	Michael Gibbs	
1985	The Golden Palominos	Visions of Excess	
1986	The Golden Palominos	Blast of Silence (Axed My Baby for a Nickel)	
2001	Gov't Mule	The Deep End, Volume 1	
1964	The Graham Bond Organisation	Live at Klooks Kleek	first released in 1972 as Faces and Places Vol. 4
1965	The Graham Bond Organisation	The Sound of '65	
1965	The Graham Bond Organisation	There's a Bond Between Us	
1983	Kip Hanrahan	Desire Develops an Edge	
1984	Kip Hanrahan	Vertical's Currency	
1986	Kip Hanrahan	A Few Short Notes from the End Run (EP)	
1993	Kip Hanrahan	Exotica	
1995	Kip Hanrahan	All Roads Are Made of the Flesh	
1994	Dick Heckstall-Smith and John Stevens	This That	
1968	Jimi Hendrix	Jack Bruce Jam	unofficial release
1983	Allan Holdsworth	Road Games	
1964	Alexis Korner's Blues Incorporated	Alexis Korner and Friends	
1966	Manfred Mann	Machines (EP), Instrumental Asylum (EP)	"Pretty Flamingo"
1974	Michael Mantler	No Answer	
1987	Michael Mantler	Live	
1988	Michael Mantler	Many Have No Speech	
1993	Michael Mantler	Folly Seeing All This	
1997	Michael Mantler	The School of Understanding	
1976	Charlie Mariano	Helen 12 Trees	
1979	Bernie Marsden	And About Time Too	
1966	John Mayall & the Bluesbreakers	Looking Back	"Stormy Monday" (compilation album released in 1969)
1966	John Mayall & the Bluesbreakers	Primal Solos	live recording first released in 1977
1982	Ellen McIlwaine	Everybody Needs It	
1978	John McLaughlin	Electric Guitarist	"Are You the One? Are You the One?" (Trio with Tony Williams)
1985	Mark Nauseef	Wun-Wun	
1995	Mark Nauseef	The Snake Music	with Miroslav Tadić
1979	Cozy Powell	Over the Top	
1981	Cozy Powell	Tilt	
1980	Trevor Rabin	Wolf	
1973	Lou Reed	Berlin	
2012	Vernon Reid, Cindy Blackman and John Medeski	Spectrum Road	
1981	Rocket 88	Rocket 88	
1981	Soft Machine	Land of Cockayne	
1981	Robin Trower	B.L.T. (album)	US#37
1982	Robin Trower	Truce	US#109, CA#39
2008	Robin Trower	Seven Moons	
2009	Robin Trower	Seven Moons Live	re-released as Songs from the Road
1990	Bill Ward	Ward One: Along the Way	
1972	West, Bruce and Laing	Why Dontcha	
1973	West, Bruce and Laing	Whatever Turns You On	
1974	West, Bruce and Laing	Live 'n' Kickin'	
1988	Leslie West	Theme	
1970	The Tony Williams Lifetime	Turn It Over	
1971	The Tony Williams Lifetime	Ego	
1974	Frank Zappa	Apostrophe (')	
