= Jimjam =

Studio album by Jim Mullen
- Released: 2000
- Genre: Soul-Jazz
- Label: Sulphuric

Jimjam (stylised as jimjam) is a 2000 recording by UK jazz-funk guitarist Jim Mullen, featuring fellow-Scot Hamish Stuart on rhythm guitar, Pino Palladino on bass and Ian Thomas on drums. The professional collaboration between Mullen and Stuart goes back a long way. As a member of The Average White Band Hamish Suart played on the Dick Morrissey and Jim Mullen album Up in 1977.

This is Mullen's first solo album following the death of his long-term musical partner Dick Morrissey.

== Track listing ==
1. "Olio"
2. "Lizards"
3. "Manhattan Lullaby"
4. "Vegas Idea"
5. "Funkin' on Sunset"
6. "Second to None"
7. "Speed Bumps"
8. "Lizard Reprise"
9. "Eljay"
10. "After the Storm"
11. "Bluestrut"

== Personnel ==
- Jim Mullen - guitar
- Hamish Stuart - guitar
- Pino Palladino - bass
- Ian Thomas - drums
