= Big Blues (Jimmy Witherspoon album) =

Studio album by Jimmy Witherspoon
- Released: 1981
- Recorded: June 1981
- Studio: The Point Studio, London
- Genre: Blues
- Label: JSP/Proper
- Producer: John Stedman

Big Blues is an album featuring Jimmy Witherspoon supported by a band of British jazz musicians. It was originally released in 1981, and was subsequently re-released in 1997, the year Witherspoon died.

== Track listing ==
1. "You Got Me Runnin'"
2. "Whiskey Drinking Woman"
3. "Once There Lived a Fool"
4. "Just a Dream"
5. "Lotus Blossom"
6. "Big Boss Man" – (Luther Dixon, Al Smith)
7. "Nobody Knows You When You're Down and Out" – (Jimmy Cox)
8. "That's the One"
9. "Let's Think Awhile"
10. "Swing on It"
11. "Point"
12. "Snow Was Falling"

== Personnel ==
- Jimmy Witherspoon – vocals
- Jim Mullen – guitar
- Peter King – alto saxophone
- Mike Carr – piano, electric piano, organ
- Harold Smith – drums
- Hal Singer – tenor saxophone
