= Cy Laurie =

British musician (1926–2002)

Cyril "Cy" Laurie
- Born: Cyril Laurie; 20 April 1926; London, England
- Died: 18 April 2002 (aged 75) Stapleford Abbotts, Essex, England
- Genres: Trad Jazz; Jazz
- Occupations: Bandleader; Musician
- Instrument: Clarinet
- Years active: 1947–2002

Cyril Laurie (20 April 1926 – 18 April 2002) was an English jazz clarinettist and bandleader.

== Biography ==
Born in London, England, of Latvian/Jewish immigrant stock, Laurie was a bandleader and self-taught clarinet player. He put together his own band in 1947; George Melly debuted in this ensemble in 1948. He played with Mike Daniels in 1949-50 and led the Cy Laurie Four in 1950, with Fred Hunt and Les Jowett. Laurie was a leading figure in the post 1945 trad jazz boom in the UK.

He ran his own club in Great Windmill Street, Soho, London from 1951 and headed a seven-member ensemble; sidemen in this group included Chris Barber, Alan Elsdon, Al Fairweather, Graham Stewart and Colin Smith. Cy Laurie's Jazz Club was in a basement (previously Mac's Rehearsal Rooms) accessed from Ham Yard, opposite the Windmill Theatre, which went on to become the famous subculture club The Scene in the 1960s. The five-star Ham Yard Hotel now stands in its place.

He quit music from 1960 to 1968, and travelled to India to study meditation with the Maharishi Mahesh Yogi. He returned in 1968 to lead another ensemble at the end of the decade. His career saw a resurgence late in the 1970s; he toured in ensembles as a soloist and sometimes led his own groups. He played with Eggy Ley and Max Collie in the 1980s. He continued performing into the 1990s. In 1996, to celebrate his 70th birthday, he put together a celebratory reunion gig at London's 100 Club. It had been noted that his performances "displayed an acute ear for changing musical fashions".

== Death ==
Laurie died on 18 April 2002, and was survived by his partner Ronnie (Veronica).

== Other sources ==
- Nevil Skrimshire, "Cy Laurie". Grove Jazz online.
