= Rocket 88 (band) =

UK boogie-woogie band (1978–1981)

- Origin: United Kingdom
- Genres: Swing jazz; boogie-woogie
- Years active: 1978–1981
- Label: Atlantic
- Spinoff of: The Rolling Stones
- Past members: Ian Stewart; Jack Bruce; Charlie Watts; Alexis Korner; Hal Singer; Dick Morrissey; Colin Smith; John Picard; Don Weller; Bob Hall; Danny Adler; George Green

Rocket 88 was a United Kingdom-based boogie-woogie band formed in the late 1970s by Ian "Stu" Stewart, Charlie Watts, Alexis Korner and Dick Morrissey.

The band is named after the 1948 Pete Johnson instrumental "Rocket 88 Boogie" and is also the title of their 1981 live album, recorded by the Rolling Stones Mobile Studio. The first known use of the phrase "Rocket 88" was for the Oldsmobile Rocket 88 car introduced by General Motors in 1949.

The continuation of an ad hoc band formed by Stewart, Watts and Bob Hall, George Green, Colin Smith, John Picard, the band featured many top British musicians, who would meet up when possible during the late 1970s and early 1980s for what was an ongoing jam session. Other "regular" members of the band included the above-mentioned founding members, plus Jack Bruce, Danny Adler, Don Weller, Colin Hodgkinson, Zoot Money, Chris Farlowe, Hal Singer, Mickey Waller, Pete York, Dave Markee, Harvey Weston, Charlie Hart, Willie Garnett, Mike Hogh, Olaf Vas and Malcolm Everson.

The band recorded a live album, Rocket 88, at the Rotation Club, Hanover, while on tour in Germany, in November 1979. It was released in March 1981 on the Atlantic Records label (SD 19293). Ian Stewart wrote the sleeve notes on the back cover of the album, giving a brief history of the band, boogie-woogie, and rock and roll.
