= Jim Mullen =

Scottish jazz guitarist (born 1945)

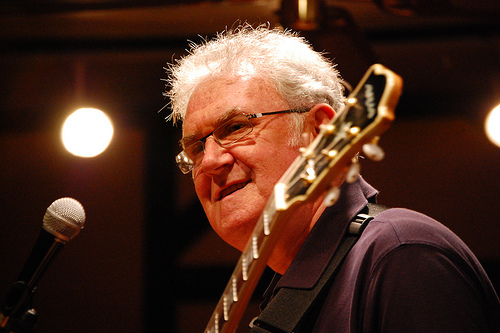
- Mullen circa 2008

Background information
- Born: 26 November 1945 (age 80); Glasgow, Scotland
- Genres: Jazz, jazz-rock
- Occupation: Musician
- Instrument: Guitar
- Years active: 1970s–present

Jim Mullen (born 26 November 1945) is a Scottish, Glasgow-born jazz guitarist with a distinctive style, like Wes Montgomery before him, picking with the thumb rather than a plectrum.

== Biography ==
Jim Mullen was guitarist with Pete Brown & Piblokto! for two albums in 1970. He then played with Brian Auger's Oblivion Express, appearing on the band's first three albums together with future Average White Band drummer Robbie McIntosh. Mullen then joined Kokomo and later toured with the Average White Band.

It was while both musicians were touring the United States with AWB in the mid-1970s that Mullen met tenor saxophone player Dick Morrissey, and throughout the 1980s, he found critical notice as joint leader of the British jazz funk band Morrissey–Mullen. Record producer Richard Niles, who produced the band's sixth album, It's About Time, later produced three solo albums for Mullen.

Mullen has also played and recorded with, among others, Mose Allison, Hamish Stuart, Joanna Eden, Tam White, Claire Martin, Mike Carr, Jimmy Witherspoon, Mornington Lockett, Dave O'Higgins and Georgie Fame, Sinan Alimanović, David Tughan, Jimmy Smith, Terry Callier and Frank Holder. Mullen has recorded as part of The AllStars, a collective of session musicians on their Paul McCartney-produced album All About the Music, alongside special guests Jocelyn Brown, Hamish Stuart and Angelo Starr. In 2014, he featured prominently on the Citrus Sun album, People of Tomorrow, produced by Incognito co-founder, Jean-Paul 'Bluey' Maunick.

Mullen has won many British music awards including "Best Guitar" in the British Telecom Jazz Awards (1994, 1996 and 2000).

== Discography ==
=== As leader/co-leader ===
- Live at Ronnie Scott's with Mike Carr and Harold Smith (1980)
- Into the 90's (1990)
- Good Times and The Blues with Dick Morrissey and Mike Carr (1993)
- Soundbites (1993)
- Big Blues with Jimmy Witherspoon (1997)
- Burns (2000)
- We Go Back (2001)
- ...but beautiful (Bobtale, 2001)
- jimjam with Hamish Stuart (2002)
- Rule of Thumb with Laurence Cottle (2003)
- Live in Glasgow with Gary Husband, Mick Hutton and Gareth Williams (2003)
- Gig Bag(2005)
- All About the Music(2007)
- Smokescreen (2007)
- Make Believe (2009)
- String Theory (2012)
- Catch My Drift (2014)

As sideman

- Things May Come and Things May Go but the Art School Dance Goes on Forever - Pete Brown & Piblokto! (Harvest, 1970)
- Thousands on a Raft - Pete Brown & Piblokto! (Harvest, 1970)
- Benny and Us - Average White Band
- The Atlantic Family Live in Montreaux (1977)
- TimePeace - Terry Callier (1998)
- Lifetime - Terry Callier (1999)
- Alive - Terry Callier (2001)
- Cartoon Capers (2001)
- The Mose Chronicles: Live in London, Vol. 2 - Mose Allison (Blue Note) (2002)
- Speak Your Peace - Terry Callier (2002)
- Builders' Brew - David Tughan (OT, 2005)
- He Never Mentioned Love - Claire Martin (2007)
- People of Tomorrow - Citrus Sun (Dome, 2014)
- One Fine Day - Chris Rea (Rhino Entertainment, 2019)
