= Al Fairweather =

- Birth name: Alastair Fairweather
- Born: 12 June 1927; Edinburgh, Scotland
- Died: 21 June 1993 (aged 66); Edinburgh
- Genres: Jazz
- Occupation: Musician
- Instrument: Trumpet

Alastair Fairweather (12 June 1927 – 21 June 1993) was a British jazz trumpeter, born in Edinburgh, Scotland. Educated at the city's Royal High School and Edinburgh College of Art, Fairweather served his National Service in Egypt.

In 1949 Fairweather started a band with his school friend Sandy Brown. In 1953 the pair went south to London with Stan Greig recorded several sides for Esquire Records as the Sandy Brown and the Fairweather-Brown All-Stars. They performed at the Royal Festival Hall.

When Brown went back to Scotland to finish his architecture studies, Fairweather joined the Cy Laurie Jazz Band. From 1966 to 1968, he worked for clarinetist Acker Bilk. Following a second career as a teacher in Harrow, London, Fairweather returned to Edinburgh in 1987, where he remained and played until his death in 1993 at the age of 66.
