= Stan Greig =

Scottish pianist, drummer, and bandleader

Stanley Mackay Greig (12 August 1930 – 18 November 2012) was a Scottish pianist, drummer, and bandleader.

Geig was born in Joppa, Edinburgh, Scotland. Greig's father was a drummer and piano tuner. Greig played with Sandy Brown while still in high school in 1945, then played piano and drums with him from 1948 to 1954. He moved to London and played the drums with Ken Colyer (1954–55), Humphrey Lyttelton (1955–57), and Bruce Turner (1957), then with the Fairweather-Brown All-Stars (led by Brown and Al Fairweather) in 1958-59. He played with Turner again briefly before becoming a member of Acker Bilk's Paramount Jazz Band from 1960 to 1968.

After 1969 Greig made piano his primary instrument, leading his own small groups and playing boogie woogie and blues piano. He played with Dave Shepherd and Johnny Hawksworth as a sideman in the early 1970s, then formed the London Jazz Big Band in 1975. From 1977-80 he played with George Melly, then toured as a bandleader in Europe (1980–82). He worked again with Lyttelton from 1985 to 1995, and worked with Wally Fawkes later in the 1990s. The Stan Greig Trio played many gigs in and around London, with the Rolling Stones's Charlie Watts sometimes turning out on drums.

Greig died on 18 November 2012, in London, England, after suffering from Parkinson's disease.

== Other sources ==
- Fairweather/Kernfeld, "Stan Greig". Grove Jazz online.
