= Pete Brown =

Performance poet and singer (1940–2023)

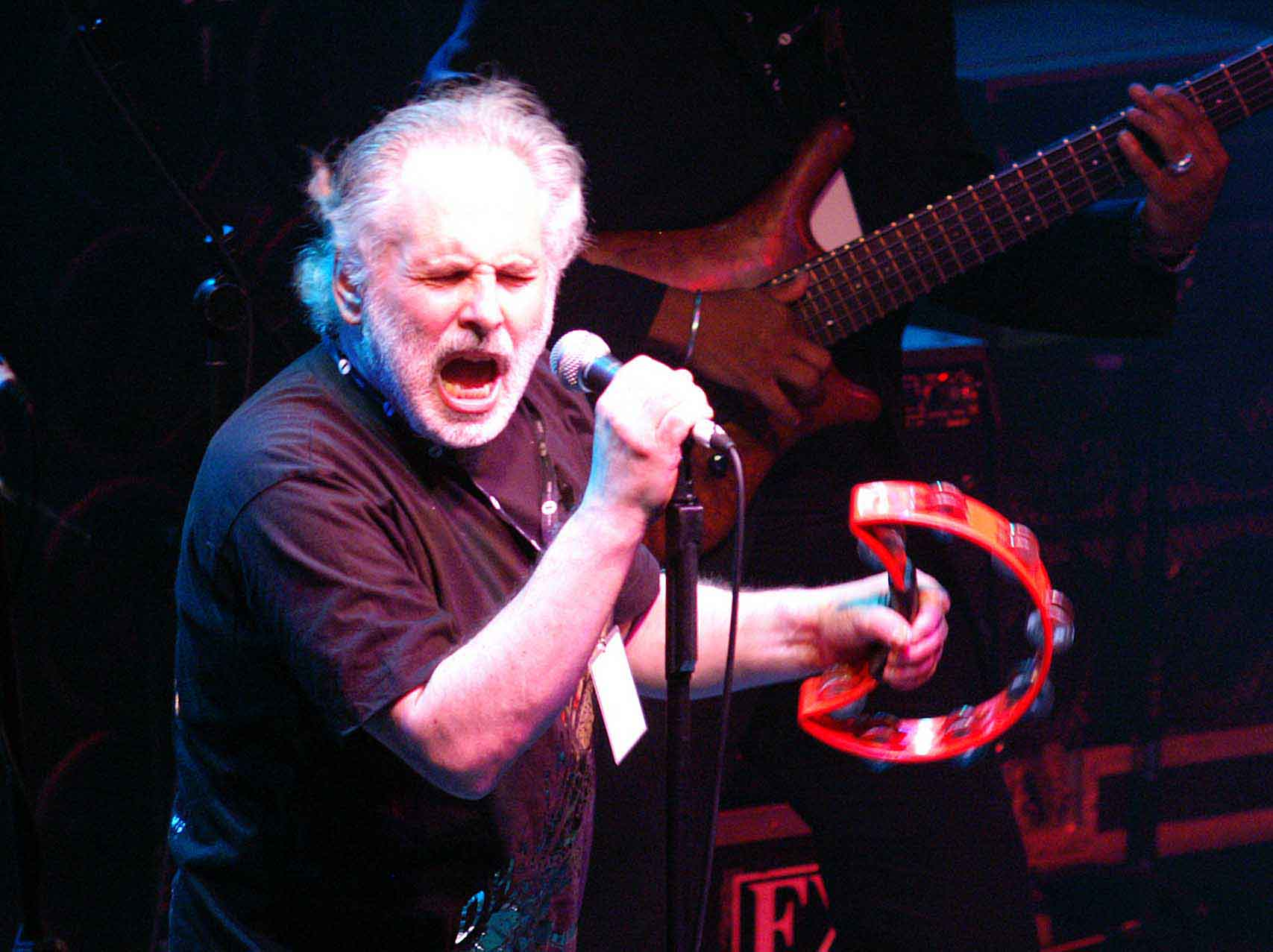
- Brown performing in 2005

Background information
- Born: Peter Ronald Brown; 25 December 1940; Ashtead, Surrey, England
- Died: 19 May 2023 (aged 82) Hastings, East Sussex, England
- Genre: Rock
- Occupations: Singer; poet; lyricist
- Instruments: Vocals; drums; percussion
- Years active: 1960s–2023
- Formerly of: Pete Brown & His Battered Ornaments; Pete Brown & Piblokto!
- Website: www.petebrown.co.uk

Peter Ronald Brown (25 December 1940 – 19 May 2023) was an English performance poet, lyricist, and singer best known for his collaborations with Cream and Jack Bruce. Brown formed the bands Pete Brown & His Battered Ornaments and Pete Brown & Piblokto! and worked with Graham Bond and Phil Ryan. Brown also wrote film scripts and formed a film production company.

== Early life, poetry and music ==
Brown was born in Ashtead, Surrey, England. Before his involvement with music, he was a poet, having his first poem published in the U.S. magazine Evergreen Review when he was 14 years old.

Brown became part of the poetry scene in Liverpool during the 1960s, and in 1964 was the first poet to perform at the Morden Tower in Newcastle. He became a significant advocate of British Beat Poetry, and in partnership with Michael Horovitz wrote poetry which they recited together as part of the 1965 international event at the Royal Albert Hall.

Combining his poetry with music, Brown began performing at live events with musicians including the "New Departures" group with Horovitz, and toured with folk guitarist Davey Graham. The First Real Poetry Band was formed by Brown with John McLaughlin (guitar), Binky McKenzie (bass), Laurie Allan (drums) and Pete Bailey (percussion).

== Cream ==
The First Real Poetry Band brought Brown to the attention of the band Cream. Originally, he was seen as a writing partner for drummer Ginger Baker, but the group quickly discovered that he worked better with bassist Jack Bruce. Of the situation, Bruce later remarked: "Ginger and Pete were at my flat trying to work on a song but it wasn't happening. My wife Janet then got with Ginger and they wrote 'Sweet Wine' while I started working with Pete."

Together, Brown and Bruce wrote many of Cream's songs, including the hits "I Feel Free", "White Room" and "SWLABR"; Brown, Bruce and Clapton also wrote "Sunshine of Your Love".

After the break-up of Cream, Bruce and Brown continued to write songs together. Brown wrote the lyrics for most of Bruce's solo albums.

== Solo career ==
Brown formed Pete Brown and His Battered Ornaments in 1968, and in 1969 the band recorded two albums: A Meal You Can Shake Hands With in the Dark and Mantlepiece, with a line-up including Pete Bailey (percussion), Charlie Hart (keyboards), Dick Heckstall-Smith (sax), Nisar Ahmad (AKA 'George') Khan (sax), Roger Potter (bass), Chris Spedding (guitar) and Rob Tait (drums). Brown was asked to leave the band, the day before they were due to support the Rolling Stones at Hyde Park. His vocals were subsequently removed from Mantlepiece and re-recorded by Chris Spedding, and the band was renamed The Battered Ornaments.

"Piblokto!" was formed after Brown's dismissal from the Battered Ornaments, and was active between 1969 and 1971. The original Piblokto! members were; Brown on vocals, Laurie Allan on drums, Jim Mullen on guitar, Roger Bunn on bass and Dave Thompson on organ. Most of their releases were for Harvest Records.

Allan left to join The Battered Ornaments and was replaced by their drummer Rob Tait. They released their first single "Living Life Backwards" / "High Flying Electric Bird" (the A-side later covered by Jeff Beck), followed by the album Things May Come and Things May Go but the Art School Dance Goes on Forever (1970). Bunn was replaced by Steve Glover for their second single, "Can't Get Off The Planet" / "Broken Magic" and the LP Thousands on a Raft (1970).

Mullen, Thompson and Tait left, so Brown and Glover were joined by Phil Ryan on keyboards, John "Pugwash" Weathers on drums (both formerly from The Eyes of Blue) and Brian Breeze on guitar. This line-up only recorded one single, "Flying Hero Sandwich"/"My Last Band". Weathers and Breeze both departed, to be replaced by guitarist Taff Williams (also formerly in The Eyes of Blue) and drummer Ed Spevock, before finally disbanding in autumn 1971, and Brown went on to work with Graham Bond. Both albums, all three singles and several bonus tracks were reissued on the double album CD BGOCD522 in 2001.

The band's name was taken from the Inuit word for "Arctic hysteria", piblokto, with symptoms including hysteria (screaming, uncontrolled wild behaviour), depression and echolalia.

== Later career ==
After Piblokto!, Brown started to work with Graham Bond, with input from Jack Bruce and Bond's wife, Diane Stewart. In 1972 they recorded one album, Two Heads Are Better Than One, a single, "Lost Tribe", and much of the soundtrack to the short experimental documentary film Maltamour, before Bond left to form Magus in 1973.

Brown then formed Brown and Friends, and Flying Tigers, though neither group got beyond producing demos. In 1973, he recorded an album of his early poems, The Not Forgotten Association, before recording with members of Back to the Front, including an album, Party in The Rain, which was recorded in 1976 but not released until 1982.

On the rise of punk, he left the music scene in 1977 and wrote film scripts, including that for Felix the Cat: The Movie. He then wrote a film score for a BBC TV film, with Phil Ryan, who had been in a late Piblokto! line-up. They collaborated for 12 years, and Brown formed his own label, Interoceter, which issued two Pete Brown/Phil Ryan albums: Ardours of the Lost Rake and Coals to Jerusalem. They began touring in 1993, and a compilation of the two albums was issued on CD as The Land That Cream Forgot (Vintage, VIN 8031-2). In the 1990s, Brown also appeared with The Interoceters, performing his earlier material.

A new Brown/Ryan album Road of Cobras, including Maggie Bell, Arthur Brown, Mick Taylor and Jim Mullen, was released in 2010.

In 2004, he formed Brown Waters, a film production company, with Mark A. J. Waters and Miran Hawke.

In 2010, Brown published his autobiography, White Rooms & Imaginary Westerns: On the Road With Ginsberg, Writing for Clapton and Cream — An Anarchic Odyssey (JR Books, London), which is in the process of being adapted as a documentary.

In 2017, Brown partnered with Gary Brooker writing lyrics for the songs on Procol Harum's final album, Novum.

Brown died of cancer in Hastings, Sussex, on 19 May 2023, at the age of 82.

== References in popular culture ==
- "Pete the Poet", a track on guitarist John McLaughlin's debut album Extrapolation (1969), is named after him.
- "Get", a song by Blurt about Brown and his model aeroplane collection.
- "Student Susan", a track on Japanese guitarist Saiichi Sugiyama's album So Am I (2004), which Brown wrote with Sugiyama, is named after the former girlfriend of Stuart Sutcliffe of the Beatles, whom Brown went out with during the Liverpool poetry scene in the early 1960s.
- Brown is mentioned in Alasdair Gray's short story "The Great Bear Cult", from Gray's collection Unlikely Stories, Mostly (Penguin Books, 1983).

== Poetry ==
- Few Poems (Birmingham: Migrant Press, 1966)
- Let 'Em Roll, Kafka (London: Fulcrum Press, ISBN 0-85246-014-7, 1969)
- The Old Pals' Act, with poems by Libby Houston, Gillian Barron, Spike Hawkins, Heather Holden, Alan Jackson, Ted Milton and Brian Patten (editor; London: Allison & Busby, ISBN 0-85031-016-4, 1972)
- The Not Forgotten Association (album of Brown reading his early poems, 1973)
- Mundane Tuesday & Freudian Saturday (Detroit: Ridgeway Press, ISBN 978-1564391360, 2016)

== Discography ==
- A Meal You Can Shake Hands with in the Dark (Harvest, SHVL 752, June 1969)
- Things May Come and Things May Go but the Art School Dance Goes on Forever (Harvest, SHVL 768, 1970)
- Thousands on a Raft (Harvest, SHVL 782, 1970)
- Two Heads Are Better Than One (1972)
- The "Not Forgotten" Association (1973)
- My Last Band (Harvest, SHSM 2017, 1977)
- Party in the Rain (1982)
- The Land That Cream Forgot (Vintage, VIN 8031-2, 1996)
- Curly's Airships (2000) (with Judge Smith)
- Pete Brown And The Interoceters – Live (2002) (with Dave 'Munch' Moore, Mo Nazam, David Hadley Ray, Simon Edgoose, Helen Hardy, Rietta Austin)
- Ardours of the Lost Rake (2003)
- Coals to Jerusalem (2003)
- The Shadow Club (2024) with Richard Bailey, Joe Bonamassa, Arthur Brown, Malcolm Bruce, Eric Clapton, Clem Clempson, John Donaldson, Carla Olson, Bobby Rush
