= List of awards and nominations received by Sheryl Crow =

Sheryl Crow awards and nominations
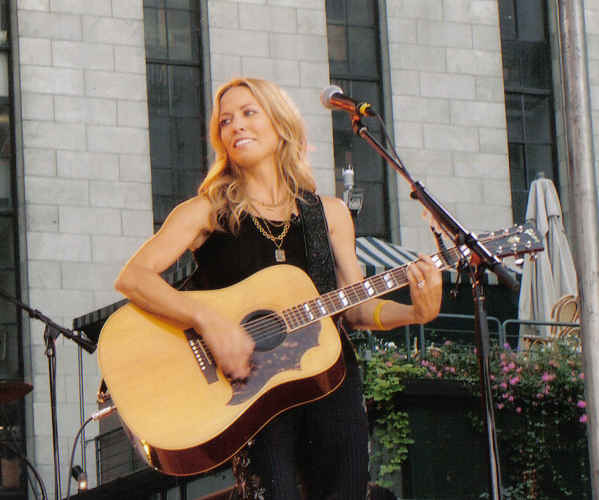
- Crow performing live in 2006
Awards & Nominations
Award	Won	Nominated
Academy of Country Music	1	5
American Music Awards	3	3
ASCAP Awards	1	1
BRIT Awards	1	2
Country Music Association	0	3
Golden Globe Awards	0	2
Grammy Awards	9	32
MTV Video Music Awards	0	1
Orville H. Gibson Awards	1	4
People's Choice Awards	1	3
- Total number of wins and nominations
Totals	17	56
- Footnotes

Sheryl Crow is an American singer-songwriter. She has released nine studio albums: Tuesday Night Music Club (1993), Sheryl Crow (1996), The Globe Sessions (1998), C'mon, C'mon (2002), Wildflower (2005), Detours (2008), Home for Christmas (2008), 100 Miles from Memphis (2010) and Feels Like Home (2013). Her compilation and specialty albums include Sheryl Crow and Friends: Live from Central Park (1999), The Very Best of Sheryl Crow (2003), Live at Budokan (2003), iTunes Originals – Sheryl Crow (2006) and Hits and Rarities (2007). All of her albums were released through A&M Records, with the exception of C'mon, C'mon and Feels Like Home, which were released through Interscope Records and Warner Bros., respectively. All of Crow's studio albums have reached Top 10 positions on the Billboard 200, three of which reached peak positions of No. 2 (C'mon, C'mon, Wildflower, and Detours). Crow's singles that have charted on the Billboard Hot 100 include "Leaving Las Vegas", "All I Wanna Do", "Strong Enough", "Can't Cry Anymore", "If It Makes You Happy", "Everyday Is a Winding Road", "My Favorite Mistake", "Anything but Down", "Soak Up the Sun", "Steve McQueen", "The First Cut Is the Deepest", "Good Is Good", "Always on Your Side" (with Sting), "Love Is Free", "Easy" and her renditions of Buddy Holly's "Not Fade Away" and Bill Withers' "Lean On Me" (with Kid Rock and Keith Urban).

For her debut album, Crow received five nominations for the Grammy Awards of 1995, winning three awards (Best Female Pop Vocal Performance and Record of the Year for "All I Wanna Do" and Best New Artist). Crow has won a total of 9 Grammy Awards from 32 nominations, and has also been awarded by the American Music Awards, ASCAP Awards, Orville H. Gibson Awards, and People's Choice Awards. Other recognitions include an honorary degree from Southeast Missouri State University and inclusions on music lists created by VH1 and Entertainment Weekly. Overall, Crow has received 16 awards from 51 nominations.

== Academy of Country Music Awards ==
The Academy of Country Music Awards were first held in 1966, honoring the industry's accomplishments during the previous year. It was the first country music awards program held by a major organization. Nomination categories include male and female vocalists, albums, videos, songs and musicians. Crow has received a total of five nominations, winning one.

Year	Nominated work	Award	Result	Ref.
2003	"Picture" (with Kid Rock)	Vocal Event of the Year	Nominated	
2007	"Building Bridges" (with Brooks & Dunn and Vince Gill)	Vocal Event of the Year	Won	
2008	"What You Give Away" (with Vince Gill)	Vocal Event of the Year	Nominated	
2011	"Coal Miner's Daughter" (with Loretta Lynn and Miranda Lambert)	Vocal Event of the Year	Nominated	
2014	Sheryl Crow	Female Vocalist of the Year	Nominated	

== American Country Awards ==
The American Country Awards is an annual country music awards show, entirely voted on by fans online. Created in 2010 by the Fox Network, the awards honor country music artists for singles, albums, music videos and touring categories. Crow has received two nominations.

Year	Nominated work	Award	Result	Ref.
2013	Sheryl Crow	Artist of the Year: Female	Nominated	
2013	"Easy"	Single of the Year: Female	Nominated	

== American Music Awards ==
The American Music Awards were created by Dick Clark in 1973 to honor popular musicians from various genres of music and to "put audiences in touch with the latest phenomena in American music". Initial nominees are selected from data compiled by the music industry trade publication, Radio & Records and Nielsen SoundScan, an information system that tracks retail music sales. Top nominees are determined from a national sampling of 15,000 people, and a winner is decided by online voting of the American public. Crow has received three awards from three nominations.

Year	Nominated work	Award	Result	Ref.
2003	Sheryl Crow	Favorite Pop/Rock Female Artist	Won	
2004	Sheryl Crow	Favorite Pop/Rock Female Artist	Won	
2004	Sheryl Crow	Favorite Adult Contemporary Artist	Won	

== Americana Music Honors and Awards ==
The Americana Music Honors & Awards were established by the Americana Music Association to celebrate the best releases in Americana music. Crow has received one nomination.

Year	Award	Nominated work	Result	Ref.
2019	Song of the Year	"By Degrees" (with Mark Erelli, Rosanne Cash, Lori McKenna, Anaïs Mitchell and Josh Ritter)	Nominated	

== APRA Music Awards ==
The APRA Awards are annually held by Australasian Performing Right Association (APRA) to honor outstanding music artists and songwriters of the year.

Year	Nominee / work	Award	Result	Ref.
1995	"All I Wanna Do"	Most Performed Foreign Work	Won	

== ASCAP Pop Music Awards ==
The American Society of Composers, Authors and Publishers (ASCAP) is a non-profit performance rights organization that protects its members' musical copyrights by monitoring public performances of their music, whether via a broadcast or live performance, and compensating them accordingly. ASCAP honors the year's most performed songs from its members in a series of annual awards shows in several different music categories.

Year	Nominee / work	Award	Result	Ref.
1996	"All I Wanna Do"	Most Performed Songs	Won	
1996	"Strong Enough"	Most Performed Songs	Won	
2004	"Soak Up the Sun"	Most Performed Songs	Won	
2005	"The First Cut Is the Deepest"	Most Performed Songs	Won	

== BDSCertified Spins Awards ==
Year	Nominee / work	Award	Result
2002	"Soak Up the Sun"	100,000 Spins	Won

== BMI Pop Awards ==
Broadcast Music, Inc. (BMI) is one of three United States performing rights organizations, along with ASCAP and SESAC. It collects license fees on behalf of songwriters, composers, and music publishers and distributes them as royalties to those members whose works have been performed.

Year	Nominee / work	Award	Result
1996	Sheryl Crow	Songwriter of the Year	Won
1996	"All I Wanna Do"	Award-Winning Song	Won
1996	"Strong Enough"	Award-Winning Song	Won
2003	"Soak Up the Sun"	Award-Winning Song	Won
2004	"Soak Up the Sun"	Award-Winning Song	Won
2004	"Picture"	Award-Winning Song	Won
2007	"Good Is Good"	Award-Winning Song	Won

== Billboard Music Awards ==
The Billboard Music Awards are sponsored by Billboard magazine to honor artists based on Billboard Year-End Charts. The award ceremony was held from 1990 to 2007, until its reintroduction in 2011. Before and after that time span, winners have been announced by Billboard, both in the press and as part of their year-end issue.

Year	Nominee / work	Award	Result
1994	Sheryl Crow	Top Billboard 200 Artist – Female	Nominated
1994	Sheryl Crow	Top Hot 100 Artist – Female	Nominated
1994	Sheryl Crow	Top Pop Artist	Nominated
1994	Sheryl Crow	Top Pop Artist – Female	Won
1997	Sheryl Crow	Top Pop Artist – Female	Nominated
1997	Sheryl Crow	Top Adult Top 40 Artist	Nominated
2002	Sheryl Crow	Top Adult Top 40 Artist	Nominated
2002	"Soak Up the Sun"	Top Adult Top 40 Track	Nominated
2004	Sheryl Crow	Top Pop Artist – Female	Nominated
2004	Sheryl Crow	Top Billboard 200 Artist – Female	Nominated
2004	Sheryl Crow	Top Adult Contemporary Artist	Nominated
2004	The Very Best of Sheryl Crow	Top Internet Album	Nominated
2004	"The First Cut Is the Deepest"	Top Adult Contemporary Track	Nominated

== Blockbuster Entertainment Awards ==
Year	Nominee / work	Award	Result	Ref.
1995	Sheryl Crow	Favorite New Artist	Won	

== BRIT Awards ==
The BRIT Awards are the British Phonographic Industry's (BPI) annual pop music awards. Crow has received one award from two nominations.

Year	Nominated work	Award	Result	Ref.
1997	Sheryl Crow	Best International Female Solo Artist	Won	
1999	Sheryl Crow	Best International Female Solo Artist	Nominated	

== CMT Music Awards ==
The CMT Music Awards is a fan-voted awards show for country music videos and television performances. The awards ceremony is held every year in Nashville, Tennessee, and broadcast live on CMT. Voting takes place on CMT's website, CMT.com. Crow has received four nominations.

Year	Nominated work	Award	Result	Ref.
2003	"Picture" (with Kid Rock)	Male Video of the Year	Nominated	
2004	"The First Cut Is the Deepest"	Hottest Video of the Year	Nominated	
2004	"The First Cut Is the Deepest"	Female Video of the Year	Nominated	
2007	"Always on Your Side" (with Sting)	Wide Open Country Video of the Year	Nominated	
2011	"Collide" (with Kid Rock)	Collaborative Video of the Year	Nominated	
2011	"Coal Miner's Daughter" (with Loretta Lynn and Miranda Lambert)	Collaborative Video of the Year	Nominated	
2014	"Easy"	Female Video of the Year	Nominated	
2020	"Tell Me When It's Over" (with Chris Stapleton)	Performance Video of the Year	Nominated	

== California Music Awards ==
The California Music Awards is a music and entertainment ceremony founded by BAM.

Year	Nominee / work	Award	Result
2000	Sheryl Crow	Outstanding Female Vocalist	Nominated

== Cash Box Year-End Awards ==
Year	Nominee / work	Award	Result	Ref.
1994	Sheryl Crow	Pop Albums: Top New Female Artist	Won	
1994	Sheryl Crow	Pop Albums: Top Female Artist	Nominated	
1994	Sheryl Crow	Pop Singles: Top New Female Artist	Nominated	
1994	"All I Wanna Do"	Top Pop Single	Nominated	
1994	Tuesday Night Music Club	Top Pop Album	Nominated	
1995	Tuesday Night Music Club	Top Pop Album	Nominated	
1995	Sheryl Crow	Pop Albums: Top Female Artist	Nominated	
1995	Sheryl Crow	Pop Albums: Top Pop/Rock Female Artist	Nominated	
1995	Sheryl Crow	Top Alternative Female Artist	Nominated	
1995	"Strong Enough"	Top Pop Single	Nominated	

== Country Music Association Awards ==
The Country Music Association Awards are held annually by the Country Music Association and celebrate excellence and achievements in the country genre. Crow has received three nominations.

Year	Nominee / work	Award	Result
2003	"Picture" (with Kid Rock)	Vocal Event of the Year	Nominated
2006	"Building Bridges" (with Brooks & Dunn and Vince Gill)	Musical Event of the Year	Nominated
2011	"Coal Miner's Daughter" (with Loretta Lynn and Miranda Lambert)	Musical Event of the Year	Nominated

== Daytime Emmy Awards ==
The Daytime Emmy Awards are awards presented by the New York–based National Academy of Television Arts and Sciences and the Los Angeles–based Academy of Television Arts & Sciences in recognition of excellence in American daytime television programming. Crow has received one nomination in the category "Outstanding Original Song".

Year	Nominated work	Award	Result	Ref.
2013	"This Day"	Outstanding Original Song	Nominated	

== Denmark GAFFA Awards ==
Delivered since 1991. The GAFFA Awards (Danish: GAFFA Prisen) are a Danish award that rewards popular music awarded by the magazine of the same name.

Year	Nominee / work	Award	Result
1999	Herself	Best Foreign Female Act	Nominated

== ECHO Awards ==
The ECHO Award is a German music award granted every year by the Deutsche Phono-Akademie, an association of recording companies.

Year	Nominee / work	Award	Result
1995	Herself	Best International Female	Nominated

== Glamour Awards ==
Year	Nominee / work	Award	Result	Ref.
2000	Herself	Woman of the Year	Won	

== Golden Globes Awards ==
The Golden Globe Awards are presented annually by the Hollywood Foreign Press Association (HFPA) to recognize outstanding achievements in the entertainment industry, both domestic and foreign, and to focus wide public attention upon the best in film and television. The formal ceremony and dinner at which the awards are presented is a major part of the film industry's awards season, which culminates each year with the Academy Awards. Crow has been nominated twice.

Year	Nominated work	Award	Result	Ref.
1997	"Tomorrow Never Dies"	Best Original Song	Nominated	
2006	"Try Not to Remember"	Best Original Song	Nominated	

== Grammy Awards ==
The Grammy Awards are awarded annually by the National Academy of Recording Arts and Sciences of the United States for outstanding achievements in the music industry. Often considered the highest music honor, the awards were established in 1958. Crow has been nominated across three separate musical genres (pop, rock and country) and has received 9 awards from 32 nominations.

Year	Nominated work	Award	Result	Ref.
1995	Sheryl Crow	Best New Artist	Won	
1995	"All I Wanna Do"	Best Female Pop Vocal Performance	Won	
1995	"All I Wanna Do"	Record of the Year	Won	
1995	"All I Wanna Do"	Song of the Year	Nominated	
1995	"I'm Gonna Be a Wheel Someday"	Best Female Rock Vocal Performance	Nominated	
1997	Sheryl Crow	Best Rock Album	Won	
1997	"If It Makes You Happy"	Best Female Rock Vocal Performance	Won	
1998	"Everyday Is a Winding Road"	Record of the Year	Nominated	
1999	The Globe Sessions	Album of the Year	Nominated	
1999	The Globe Sessions	Best Rock Album	Won	
1999	The Globe Sessions	Producer of the Year	Nominated	
1999	"My Favorite Mistake"	Best Female Pop Vocal Performance	Nominated	
1999	"There Goes the Neighborhood"	Best Female Rock Vocal Performance	Nominated	
1999	"Tomorrow Never Dies"	Best Song Written Specifically for a Motion Picture or TV	Nominated	
2000	"Sweet Child O' Mine"	Best Female Rock Vocal Performance	Won	
2001	"There Goes the Neighborhood" (live)	Best Female Rock Vocal Performance	Won	
2001	"Strong Enough" (live) (with Dixie Chicks)	Best Country Collaboration with Vocals	Nominated	
2001	"The Difficult Kind" (with Sarah McLachlan)	Best Pop Collaboration with Vocals	Nominated	
2002	"Long Gone Lonesome Blues"	Best Female Country Vocal Performance	Nominated	
2003	"Flesh and Blood" (with Mary Chapin Carpenter and Emmylou Harris)	Best Country Collaboration with Vocals	Nominated	
2003	C'mon, C'mon	Best Rock Album	Nominated	
2003	C'mon, C'mon	Best Engineered Album, Non-Classical	Nominated	
2003	"Steve McQueen"	Best Female Rock Vocal Performance	Won	
2003	"Soak Up the Sun"	Best Female Pop Vocal Performance	Nominated	
2003	"It's So Easy" (with Don Henley)	Best Pop Collaboration with Vocals	Nominated	
2005	"The First Cut Is the Deepest"	Best Female Pop Vocal Performance	Nominated	
2006	"Building Bridges" (with Brooks & Dunn and Vince Gill)	Best Country Collaboration with Vocals	Nominated	
2006	"Good Is Good"	Best Female Pop Vocal Performance	Nominated	
2006	Wildflower	Best Pop Vocal Album	Nominated	
2007	"You Can Close Your Eyes"	Best Female Pop Vocal Performance	Nominated	
2007	"Always on Your Side" (with Sting)	Best Pop Collaboration with Vocals	Nominated	
2009	Detours	Best Pop Vocal Album	Nominated	
2023	"Forever"	Best American Roots Song	Nominated	

== Groovevolt Music and Fashion Awards ==
Year	Nominee / work	Award	Result
2005	"The First Cut Is the Deepest"	Best Pop Song Performance – Female	Nominated

== Hollywood Music in Media Awards ==
The Hollywood Music in Media Awards (HMMA) recognizes and honors the music of visual mediums (films, TV, movie trailers, video games, commercials, etc.).

Year	Nominee / work	Award	Result
2016	"Dancing with Your Shadow"	Song – Featured Film	Nominated

== MTV Video Music Awards ==
Originally beginning as an alternative to the Grammy Awards, the MTV Video Music Awards were established in the end of the summer of 1984 by MTV to celebrate the top music videos of the year. Crow has been nominated once.

Year	Nominated work	Award	Result	Ref.
1994	"Leaving Las Vegas"	Best Female Video	Nominated	

== NME Awards ==
The NME Awards are annual music awards show founded by the music magazine NME.

Year	Nominated work	Award	Result	Ref.
1997	Herself	Best Solo Artist	Nominated	
1998	Herself	Best Solo Artist	Nominated	

== Orville H. Gibson Awards ==
The Orville H. Gibson Awards, named after the luthier who founded the Gibson Guitar Corporation, recognize guitar players for their artistic accomplishments and to "honor musicians who reflect the spirit of Orville H. Gibson and his belief in quality, prestige and innovation". Award nominees are chosen by a panel of editors from guitar magazines, with winners determined by music critics from around the United States. Crow has received one award from four nominations.

Year	Nominated work	Award	Result	Ref.
2000	Sheryl Crow	Best Female Acoustic Guitarist	Won	
2001	Sheryl Crow	Best Female Rock Guitarist	Nominated	
2002	Sheryl Crow	Best Female Acoustic Guitarist	Nominated	
2003	Sheryl Crow	Best Female Acoustic Guitarist	Nominated	

== People's Choice Awards ==
The People's Choice Awards were created in 1975 by producer Bob Stivers to recognize America's favorite film, movie, television and pop culture stars. In the past, the People's Choice Awards were based on Gallup polls, though online voting has decided the winners the past few years. Crow has received one award from three nominations.

Year	Nominated work	Award	Result	Ref.
2005	Sheryl Crow	Favorite Female Musical Performer	Nominated	
2005	"The First Cut Is the Deepest"	Favorite Remake	Won	
2007	"Real Gone"	Favorite Song from a Movie	Nominated	

== Pollstar Concert Industry Awards ==
The Pollstar Concert Industry Awards aim to reward the best in the business of shows and concerts.

Year	Nominee / work	Award	Result
1995	Herself	Best New Rock Artist Tour	Nominated
1995	Tour	Club Tour of the Year	Nominated
2007	Tour (w/John Mayer)	Most Creative Tour Package	Nominated

== Pop Awards ==
Pop Magazine is an online music magazine created by Hotspot Entertainment and published by A-Z Publishings. The magazine was launched on April 24, 2014. In 2018, Pop Magazine launched the first annual Pop Awards with 25 nominees across 5 categories.

Year	Nominee / work	Award	Result
2020	Herself	Lifetime Achievement Award	Nominated

== Teen Choice Awards ==
The Teen Choice Awards were established in 1999 to honor the year's biggest achievements in music, movies, sports and television, being voted by young people aged between 13 and 19. Sheryl Crow has been nominated three times.

Year	Nominee / work	Award	Result
2002	"Soak Up the Sun"	Choice Summer Song	Nominated
2003	"Picture" (feat. Kid Rock)	Choice Music: Love Song	Nominated
2003	"Picture" (feat. Kid Rock)	Choice Music: Hook Up	Nominated

== VH1 Big in 2002 Awards ==
The VH1's Big in 2002 Awards was an award show that aired on VH1 in the United States. It is the annual VH1's Big in... Awards.

Year	Nominee / work	Award	Result
2002	C'mon, C'mon	Hit Me Baby One More Time	Nominated
2002	"Soak Up the Sun"	Can't Get You Out of My Head	Nominated

== Žebřík Music Awards ==
Year	Nominee / work	Award	Result	Ref.
1996	Herself	Best International Female	Nominated	
1997	Herself	Best International Female	Nominated	
1998	Herself	Best International Female	Nominated	
1999	Herself	Best International Female	Nominated	

== Other recognitions ==
- 1999 – Crow ranked No. 45 on VH1's 100 Greatest Women of Rock & Roll
- 2001 – Crow received an honorary degree during the commencement ceremony at Southeast Missouri State University
- 2002 – Crow ranked No. 41 on VH1's 100 Sexiest Artists
- 2003 – VH1's 100 Best Songs of the Past 25 Years included "All I Wanna Do" at No. 56
- 2008 – Entertainment Weekly's "100 Best Albums of the Last 25 Years" included Sheryl Crow at No. 39
- 2012 – Crow ranked No. 25 on VH1's 100 Greatest Women in Music
- 2013 – VH1's 100 Greatest Songs of the '90s included "All I Wanna Do" at No. 61
- 2013 – Crow ranked No. 85 on VH1's 100 Sexiest Artists
- 2013 – Billboard ranked Crow No. 44 on Top Country Artists
