= The Very Best of Sheryl Crow =

Greatest hits album by Sheryl Crow
- Released: October 13, 2003 (UK); November 4, 2003 (US)
- Recorded: 1993–2003
- Genre: Rock; folk; country; pop
- Length: 77:41 (UK); 77:18 (US); 57 minutes (DVD)
- Label: A&M
- Producer: Sheryl Crow; Bill Bottrell; Garth Fundis; Kid Rock; John Shanks; Jeff Trott

Sheryl Crow chronology
C'mon, C'mon (2002)	The Very Best of Sheryl Crow (2003)	Wildflower (2005)

Singles from The Very Best of Sheryl Crow
- 1. "The First Cut Is the Deepest" Released: October 20, 2003; 2. "Light in Your Eyes" Released: June 21, 2004

Professional ratings
Review scores
Source	Rating
AllMusic	4/5 stars

The Very Best of Sheryl Crow is a greatest hits album by American singer-songwriter Sheryl Crow, released on October 13, 2003, in the United Kingdom and November 4, 2003, in the United States. The album was a commercial success, reaching No. 2 on both the UK Albums Chart and the Billboard 200, selling four million units in the US as of January 2008. The album also received a platinum accreditation by the International Federation of the Phonographic Industry for sales of over one million copies in Europe.

== Track listing ==
=== International release ===
Internationally some tracks were changed:

- A three-disc box set was released in the UK with live album Sheryl Crow and Friends: Live from Central Park CD and a bonus DVD of music videos for the songs on this album.
- Some Japanese pressings also came with a DVD of Sheryl Crow and Friends: Live from Central Park.
- For the French release, "The First Cut Is the Deepest" is featuring French singer Gérald de Palmas.
- Last track of the German release is "It's So Easy" featuring Wolfgang Niedecken, which was released as a single.

=== DVD release ===
The DVD features 14 video tracks, missing out "Light in Your Eyes", "Picture", "C'mon C'mon" and "I Shall Believe". Sound is PCM stereo.

=== Digital release ===
Digital US versions of the album at Amazon.com and the iTunes Store omit track 11, "Picture". All the subsequent tracks shift their numbering back accordingly. Internationally, the song is still available digitally, but only when the album is purchased as a whole.

US version
No.	Title	Writer(s)	Producer(s)	Length
1.	"All I Wanna Do" (from Tuesday Night Music Club, 1993)	Sheryl Crow; Kevin Gilbert; Bill Bottrell; Wyn Cooper; David Baerwald	Bill Bottrell	4:33
2.	"Soak Up the Sun" (from C'mon, C'mon, 2002)	Crow; Jeff Trott	Sheryl Crow; Jeff Trott	4:51
3.	"My Favorite Mistake" (from The Globe Sessions, 1998)	Crow; Trott	Crow	4:06
4.	"The First Cut Is the Deepest" (Previously unreleased)	Cat Stevens	John Shanks	3:46
5.	"Everyday Is a Winding Road" (from Sheryl Crow, 1996)	Crow; Trott; Brian MacLeod	Crow	4:16°
6.	"Leaving Las Vegas" (from Tuesday Night Music Club)	Crow; Bottrell; Baerwald; Gilbert; David Ricketts	Bottrell	5:10
7.	"Strong Enough" (from Tuesday Night Music Club)	Crow; Bottrell; Baerwald; Gilbert; MacLeod; Ricketts	Bottrell	3:10
8.	"Light in Your Eyes" (Previously unreleased)	Crow; John Shanks	Shanks	4:00
9.	"If It Makes You Happy" (from Sheryl Crow)	Crow; Trott	Crow	5:23
10.	"The Difficult Kind" (from The Globe Sessions)	Crow	Crow	6:20
11.	"Picture" (feat. Kid Rock) (from Cocky, 2001)	Kid Rock; Crow	Kid Rock	4:58
12.	"Steve McQueen" (from C'mon, C'mon)	Crow; Shanks	Crow; Shanks	3:26
13.	"A Change Would Do You Good" (from Sheryl Crow)	Crow; MacLeod; Trott	Crow	3:49
14.	"Home" (from Sheryl Crow)	Crow	Crow	4:50
15.	"There Goes the Neighborhood" (from The Globe Sessions)	Crow; Trott	Crow	5:02
16.	"I Shall Believe" (from Tuesday Night Music Club)	Crow; Bottrell	Bottrell	5:33
17.	"The First Cut Is the Deepest" (Country version, bonus track)	Stevens	Shanks; Garth Fundis	3:44
Total length:				77:18

UK version
No.	Title	Writer(s)	Producer(s)	Length
1.	"All I Wanna Do"	Crow; Baerwald; Bottrell; Cooper; Gilbert	Bottrell	4:33
2.	"Soak Up the Sun"	Crow; Trott	Crow; Trott	4:51
3.	"My Favorite Mistake"	Crow; Trott	Crow	4:06
4.	"The First Cut Is the Deepest"	Stevens	Shanks	3:46
5.	"Everyday Is a Winding Road"	Crow; MacLeod; Trott	Crow	4:16
6.	"Leaving Las Vegas"	Crow; Bottrell; Baerwald; Gilbert; Ricketts	Bottrell	5:10
7.	"Strong Enough"	Crow; Bottrell; Baerwald; Gilbert; MacLeod; Ricketts	Bottrell	3:10
8.	"Light in Your Eyes"	Crow; Shanks	Shanks	4:00
9.	"If It Makes You Happy"	Crow; Trott	Crow	5:23
10.	"Run Baby Run" (from Tuesday Night Music Club)	Crow	Bottrell	4:53
11.	"Picture"	R. J. Ritchie; Crow	R. J. Ritchie	4:58
12.	"C'mon, C'mon" (feat. The Corrs) (single release, 2003)	Crow	Crow	4:23
13.	"A Change Would Do You Good"	Crow; MacLeod; Trott	Crow	3:49
14.	"Home"	Crow	Crow	4:50
15.	"There Goes the Neighborhood"	Crow; Trott	Crow	5:02
16.	"I Shall Believe"	Crow; Bottrell	Bottrell	5:33
17.	"Let's Get Free" (Previously unreleased)	Crow	Crow	4:41
Total length:				77:41

DVD edition
No.	Title	Director(s)	Length
1.	"All I Wanna Do"	David Hogan
2.	"Soak Up the Sun"	Wayne Isham
3.	"My Favorite Mistake"	Samuel Bayer
4.	"The First Cut Is the Deepest"	Wayne Isham
5.	"Everyday Is a Winding Road"	Peggy Sirota
6.	"Leaving Las Vegas"	David Hogan
7.	"Strong Enough"	Martin Bell
8.	"If It Makes You Happy"	Keir McFarlane
9.	"Run Baby Run"	David Hogan; David Cameron
10.	"Steve McQueen"	Wayne Isham
11.	"A Change Would Do You Good"	V1 -: Lance Acord; Sheryl Crow; V2 - Michel Gondry
12.	"Home"	Samuel Bayer
13.	"There Goes the Neighborhood"	Matthew Rolston
14.	"Anything but Down" (from The Globe Sessions)	Floria Sigismondi

== Personnel ==
- Sheryl Crow – acoustic guitar, piano, bass guitar, vocals, background vocals, 12 string guitar
- Jimmie Bones – keyboards
- Tom Bukovac – electric guitar
- Joel Derouin – concert master
- Shannon Forrest – drums
- Paul Franklin – steel guitar
- Shirley Hayden – background vocals
- Kid Rock – rhythm guitar, vocals
- Abraham Laboriel Jr. – drums
- Misty Love – background vocals
- Jamie Muhoberac – keyboards
- Kenny Olson – guitar
- Michael Rhodes – bass
- Matt Rollings – piano
- John Shanks – bass, electric guitar, background vocals
- Producers: Sheryl Crow, Bill Bottrell, Garth Fundis, Kid Rock, John Shanks, Jeff Trott
- Engineers: Matt Andrews, Marc DeSisto, Jeff Rothschild, Al Sutton
- Mixing: Chuck Ainlay, Kid Rock, Jeff Rothschild, Al Sutton, Dave Way
- Production coordination: Shari Sutcliffe
- String arrangements: Patrick Warren
- Assistant: Josh Muncy
- Contractor: Shari Sutcliffe
- Photography: Naomi Kaltman, Peter Lindbergh, Mark Seliger
- Liner notes: David Wild

== Charts ==
=== Weekly charts ===
Chart (2003)	Peak position
Austrian Albums Chart	12
Belgian Albums Chart (Flanders)	20
Canadian Albums Chart	2
Danish Albums Chart	35
Dutch Albums Chart	72
French SNEP Compilations Chart	6
German Media Control Albums Chart	17
Japanese Albums Chart	11
New Zealand Albums Chart	6
Norwegian VG-lista Albums Chart	9
Scottish Albums Chart	3
Spanish Albums Chart	94
Swedish Albums Chart	26
Swiss Albums Chart	7
UK Albums Chart	2
US Billboard 200	2
Italian Albums (FIMI)	71

=== Year-end charts ===
Chart (2003)	Position
Swiss Albums Chart	65
UK Albums Chart	32
US Billboard 200	179
Worldwide Albums (IFPI)	22
Chart (2004)	Position
US Billboard 200	9

== Certifications ==
Region	Certification	Certified units/sales
Australia (ARIA)	Gold	35,000^{^}
Canada (Music Canada)	5× Platinum	500,000^{^}
Germany (BVMI)	Gold	100,000^{‡}
Japan (RIAJ)	Gold	100,000^{^}
New Zealand (RMNZ)	Platinum	15,000^{^}
Switzerland (IFPI Switzerland)	Gold	20,000^{^}
United Kingdom (BPI)	Platinum	500,000
United States (RIAA)	3× Platinum	4,000,000
Summaries
Europe (IFPI)	Platinum	1,000,000^{*}
^{*} Sales figures based on certification alone.^{^} Shipments figures based on certification alone.^{‡} Sales+streaming figures based on certification alone.

== Accolades ==
Grammys

Year	Nominee / work	Award	Result
2005	"The First Cut Is the Deepest"	Best Female Pop Vocal Performance	Nominated
