= C'mon, C'mon (album) =

Studio album by Sheryl Crow
- Released: April 8, 2002
- Recorded: 2001–2002
- Studio: Clinton Recording, New York City; Avatar, New York City; Sunset Sound, Hollywood; Sound Factory, Hollywood; The Living Room, Los Angeles; Henson Recording, Hollywood; Ocean Way, Nashville; Emerald, Nashville; Black Apple, Portland; Funny Bunny, London
- Genre: Pop rock; folk rock; country rock
- Length: 56:39
- Label: A&M
- Producer: Sheryl Crow; John Shanks; Jeff Trott

Sheryl Crow chronology
| Sheryl Crow and Friends: Live from Central Park (1999) | C'mon, C'mon (2002) | The Very Best of Sheryl Crow (2003) |

Singles from C'mon, C'mon
- 1. "Soak Up the Sun" Released: February 11, 2002; 2. "Steve McQueen" Released: July 1, 2002; 3. "C'mon, C'mon" Released: 2002; 4. "It's So Easy" Released: 2002

Professional ratings
Aggregate scores
| Source | Rating |
|---|---|
| Metacritic | 63/100 |
Review scores
| Source | Rating |
| AllMusic | 4.5/5 stars |
| Blender | 4/5 stars |
| Entertainment Weekly | B+ |
| The Guardian | 3/5 stars |
| Los Angeles Times | 3/4 stars |
| Q | 3/5 stars |
| Rolling Stone | 3/5 stars |
| The Rolling Stone Album Guide | 4/5 stars |
| Spin | 7/10 |
| The Village Voice | C+ |

C'mon, C'mon is the fourth studio album by American singer-songwriter Sheryl Crow, released on April 8, 2002, in the United Kingdom and April 16, 2002, in the United States. Lead single "Soak Up the Sun" peaked at No. 1 on the Billboard Adult Contemporary chart and No. 17 on the Billboard Hot 100, becoming one of her biggest hits since "All I Wanna Do". The album was arguably her most pop-influenced to date, a big departure from the folk and rock sound on her previous release, The Globe Sessions.

C'mon, C'mon debuted at No. 2 on the UK Albums Chart and on the US Billboard 200, with first-week sales of 185,000 copies in the United States. The album has been certified Platinum in the US and Japan, selling 2.1 million units in the US as of January 2008. The song "Safe and Sound" is dedicated to Crow's former boyfriend Owen Wilson and is an account of their relationship.

== Track listing ==
All tracks written by Sheryl Crow, with additional writers noted.

| No. | Title | Writer(s) | Length |
|---|---|---|---|
| 1. | "Steve McQueen" | John Shanks | 3:25 |
| 2. | "Soak Up the Sun" (guest vocals by Liz Phair) | Jeff Trott | 4:52 |
| 3. | "You're an Original" (guest vocals by Lenny Kravitz) | Trott | 4:18 |
| 4. | "Safe and Sound" | | 4:32 |
| 5. | "C'mon, C'mon" (guest vocals by Stevie Nicks) | | 4:45 |
| 6. | "It's So Easy" (guest vocals by Don Henley) | Kathryn Crow | 3:24 |
| 7. | "Over You" | | 4:38 |
| 8. | "Lucky Kid" | Trott | 4:02 |
| 9. | "Diamond Road" (guest vocals by Stevie Nicks) | Marti Frederiksen | 4:09 |
| 10. | "It's Only Love" (guest vocals by Gwyneth Paltrow) | | 5:05 |
| 11. | "Abilene" (guest vocals by Natalie Maines) | Trott | 4:05 |
| 12. | "Hole in My Pocket" | Peter Stroud | 4:37 |
| 13. | "Weather Channel" (guest vocals by Emmylou Harris) | | 4:40 |

Japan bonus tracks
| No. | Title | Writer(s) | Length |
|---|---|---|---|
| 14. | "Missing" | | 4:27 |
| 15. | "I Want You" | | 4:55 |
| 16. | "You're Not the One" (guest vocals by Stevie Nicks) | Stevie Nicks | 4:06 |

UK bonus tracks
| No. | Title | Length |
|---|---|---|
| 14. | "Missing" | 4:25 |
| 15. | "I Want You" | 4:53 |

Brazil, Australia and Germany bonus track
| No. | Title | Length |
|---|---|---|
| 14. | "Missing" | 4:23 |

== Music videos ==
- "Steve McQueen"
- "Soak Up the Sun"
- "Safe and Sound" (live)

== Personnel ==
- Sheryl Crow – organ, acoustic guitar, bass guitar, piano, accordion, electric guitar, keyboards, Hammond organ, maracas, vocals, chorus, Fender Rhodes, Wurlitzer, Moog bass, tambo drums, Moroccan drum
- Jeff Anthony – drums, drum programming
- Rena Andoh – viola
- Lynn Bechtold – violin
- Charlie Bisharat – violin
- Doyle Bramhall II – guitar, electric guitar, background vocals
- Matthew Brubeck – cello, string arrangements
- Lenny Castro – percussion, congas, shaker
- Keith Ciancia – organ, keyboards, string samples
- Karen Crow – handclaps
- Cenovia Cummins – violin
- Joe Deninzon – violin
- Joel Derouin – violin, concert master
- Mike Elizondo – bass guitar
- Davey Faragher – upright bass
- Mitchell Froom – string arrangements
- Matt Funes – viola
- Berj Garabedian – violin
- David Gold – viola
- Douglas Grean – electric guitar, keyboards
- Joyce Hammann – violin
- Emmylou Harris – vocals on "Weather Channel"
- Don Henley – vocals on "It's So Easy"
- Jill Jaffe – violin
- Brad Jones – bass
- Steve Jordan – drums, tambo drums, Moroccan drum, maracas
- Suzie Katayama – cello, Contractor, concert master
- Julia Kent – cello
- Michelle Kinney – cello
- Lenny Kravitz – vocals on "You're an Original"
- Ron Lawrence – viola
- Brian MacLeod – drum fills
- Natalie Maines – vocals on "Abilene"
- Wendy Melvoin – electric guitar
- Stevie Nicks – vocals on "C'mon, C'mon" and "Diamond Road"
- Gwyneth Paltrow – vocals on "It's Only Love"
- Paul Peabody – violin
- Shawn Pelton – drums, bells, drum loops
- Liz Phair – vocals on "Soak Up the Sun"
- Matthew Pierce – violin
- Lorenza Ponce – violin, string arrangements
- Michele Richards – violin
- Craig Ross – guitar, electric guitar, rhythm guitar
- Jane Scarpantoni – cello, contractor
- John Shanks – bass guitar, electric guitar, drum loops, percussion programming
- Keith Schreiner – drum programming
- Debra Shufelt – viola
- Antoine Silverman – violin, concert master
- Daniel Smith – cello
- Tim Smith – acoustic guitar, bass guitar, electric guitar, background vocals
- Jeremy Stacey – percussion, drums, toy piano, synthesizer strings, Moog lead, drum loops, string arrangements
- Rudy Stein – cello
- Peter Stroud – acoustic guitar, guitar, electric guitar, background vocals, slide guitar, Wurlitzer, acoustic 12 string guitar, drum loops
- Shari Sutcliffe – contractor
- Marti Sweet – violin
- Hiroko Taguchi – violin
- Benmont Tench – organ, piano, Hammond organ
- Jeff Trott – acoustic guitar, bass guitar, electric guitar, lap steel guitar, drum programming
- Soozie Tyrell – violin
- Joan Wasser – violin
- Evan Wilson – viola
- Garo Yellin – cello

=== Production ===
- Producers: Sheryl Crow except tracks 2 and 3 produced by Sheryl Crow & Jeff Trott and track 1 by Sheryl Crow & John Shanks
- Executive producer: Scooter Weintraub
- Engineers: Dean Baskerville, Monique Mizrahi, Thom Panunzio, Ross Petersen, Chris Reynolds, John Saylor, Brian Scheuble, Christopher Shaw, Trina Shoemaker, Keith Shortreed, Peter Stroud, Eric Tew, Mark Valentine
- Mixing: Jack Joseph Puig (tracks 1, 3, 4, 6), Steve Sisco (mixing assistant), Andy Wallace (tracks 2, 5, 7, 8, 9, 10, 11, 12, 13, 14, 15), Joe Zook (mixing assistant)
- Mastering: Howie Weinberg
- Sampling: John Shanks
- Digital editing: Roger Lian
- Production coordination: Chris Hudson, Pam Wertheimer
- Art direction: Jeri Heiden
- Design: Jeri Heiden, Glen Nakasako
- Photography: Sheryl Nields

== Charts and certifications ==
=== Weekly charts ===
Weekly chart performance for C'mon C'mon
| Chart (2002) | Peak position |
|---|---|
| Australian Albums (ARIA) | 40 |
| Austrian Albums (Ö3 Austria) | 4 |
| Belgian Albums (Ultratop Flanders) | 25 |
| Belgian Albums (Ultratop Wallonia) | 31 |
| Canadian Albums (Billboard) | 2 |
| Danish Albums (Hitlisten) | 15 |
| Dutch Albums (Album Top 100) | 50 |
| European Albums Chart | 5 |
| Finnish Albums (Suomen virallinen lista) | 25 |
| French Albums (SNEP) | 16 |
| German Albums (Offizielle Top 100) | 7 |
| Italian Albums (FIMI) | 37 |
| Japanese Albums (Oricon) | 9 |
| Norwegian Albums (VG-lista) | 11 |
| Scottish Albums (OCC) | 1 |
| Swedish Albums (Sverigetopplistan) | 12 |
| Swiss Albums (Schweizer Hitparade) | 4 |
| UK Albums (OCC) | 2 |
| US Billboard 200 | 2 |

=== Year-end charts ===
Year-end chart performance for C'mon, C'mon
| Chart (2002) | Position |
|---|---|
| Austrian Albums (Ö3 Austria) | 65 |
| Canadian Albums (Nielsen SoundScan) | 40 |
| German Albums (Offizielle Top 100) | 79 |
| Japanese Albums (Oricon) | 148 |
| Swiss Albums (Schweizer Hitparade) | 31 |
| UK Albums (OCC) | 129 |
| US Billboard 200 | 35 |

| Chart (2003) | Position |
|---|---|
| US Billboard 200 | 177 |

=== Certifications ===
| Region | Certification | Certified units/sales |
|---|---|---|
| Canada (Music Canada) | Platinum | 100,000^{^} |
| Japan (RIAJ) | Platinum | 200,000^{^} |
| Switzerland (IFPI Switzerland) | Gold | 20,000^{^} |
| United Kingdom (BPI) | Gold | 140,000 |
| United States (RIAA) | Platinum | 2,100,000 |
^{^} Shipments figures based on certification alone.

== Accolades ==
Grammys

| Year | Nominee / work | Award | Result |
|---|---|---|---|
| 2003 | C'mon, C'mon | Best Rock Album, Grammy Award for Best Engineered Album, Non-Classical | Nominated |
| 2003 | "Steve McQueen" | Best Female Rock Vocal Performance | Won |
| 2003 | "Soak Up the Sun" | Best Female Pop Vocal Performance | Nominated |
| 2003 | "It's So Easy" (Duet with Don Henley) | Best Pop Collaboration with Vocals | Nominated |

American Music Awards

| Year | Nominee / work | Award | Result |
|---|---|---|---|
| 2003 | Sheryl Crow (performer) | Favorite Pop/Rock Female Artist | Won |
