= Anything but Down =

1999 single by Sheryl Crow

Single by Sheryl Crow

from the album The Globe Sessions
- B-side: "The Difficult Kind"
- Released: February 22, 1999
- Studio: Globe (New York City); Sunset Sound Factory (Los Angeles)
- Length: 4:18
- Label: A&M
- Songwriter: Sheryl Crow
- Producer: Sheryl Crow

Sheryl Crow singles chronology
"There Goes the Neighborhood" (1999)	"Anything but Down" (1999)	"Sweet Child o' Mine" (1999)

Music video
- "Anything but Down" on YouTube

"Anything but Down" is a song by American singer-songwriter Sheryl Crow. Released as the third single from her third studio album, The Globe Sessions (1998), it fared better than its predecessor "There Goes the Neighborhood" in the United States, reaching number 49 on the Billboard Hot 100 and number one on the Billboard Triple-A chart. The song also reached number 11 in Canada and number 19 in the United Kingdom.

== Music video ==
The video for this single was directed by Floria Sigismondi, and was later released on the DVD of the CD/DVD release of The Very Best of Sheryl Crow.

== Track listings ==
US 7-inch single

A. "Anything but Down" – 4:18
B. "The Difficult Kind" – 6:19

UK CD1

1. "Anything but Down" (LP version) – 4:18
2. "Leaving Las Vegas" (live in Toronto) – 5:33
3. "Mississippi" (live) – 3:38

UK CD2

1. "Anything but Down" (LP version) – 4:18
2. "Run Baby Run" (live in Milan) – 3:40
3. "Riverwide" (live for Wise Buddah) – 4:13

UK cassette single

1. "Anything but Down" (LP version) – 4:18
2. "Run Baby Run" (live in Milan) – 3:40

== Credits and personnel ==
Credits are lifted from The Globe Sessions album booklet.

Studios

- Recorded at Globe Studios (New York City) and Sunset Sound Factory (Los Angeles)
- Mixed at Sunset Sound Factory (Los Angeles) and Soundtracks (New York City)
- Mastered at Gateway Mastering (Portland, Maine, US)

Personnel

- Sheryl Crow – writing, vocals, acoustic guitar, production
- Jeff Trott – electric guitar
- Greg Leisz – pedal steel guitar
- Dan Rothchild – bass
- Benmont Tench – piano
- Dan McCarroll – drums
- Trina Shoemaker – recording
- Husky Höskulds – additional recording
- Andy Wallace – mixing
- Bob Ludwig – mastering

== Charts ==
=== Weekly charts ===
Chart (1999)	Peak position
Canada Top Singles (RPM)	11
Canada Adult Contemporary (RPM)	14
Europe (Eurochart Hot 100)	76
Finland (Suomen virallinen singlelista)	36
Quebec (ADISQ)	36
Scottish Singles Sales (Official Charts)	17
UK Singles (Official Charts)	19
US Billboard Hot 100	49
US Adult Alternative Airplay (Billboard)	1
US Adult Pop Airplay (Billboard)	7
US Pop Airplay (Billboard)	17

=== Year-end charts ===
Chart (1999)	Position
Canada Top Singles (RPM)	70
Canada Adult Contemporary (RPM)	82
US Adult Top 40 (Billboard)	27
US Mainstream Top 40 (Billboard)	76
US Triple-A (Billboard)	9

== Release history ==
Region	Date	Format(s)	Label(s)	Ref.
United States	February 8–9, 1999	Adult contemporary; contemporary hit radio	A&M	
United Kingdom	February 22, 1999	CD; cassette	A&M; Polydor	
