= Grammy Award for Best Female Rock Vocal Performance =

Honor presented to female recording artists for quality rock vocal performances

- Awarded for: Quality female vocal performances in the rock music genre
- Country: United States
- Presented by: The Recording Academy
- First award: 1980
- Final award: 2004
- Currently held by: Pink, "Trouble" (2004)
- Website: grammy.com

The Grammy Award for Best Female Rock Vocal Performance was an award presented at the Grammy Awards, a ceremony that was established in 1958 and originally called the Gramophone Awards, to female recording artists for works (songs or albums) containing quality vocal performances in the rock music genre. Honors in several categories are presented at the ceremony annually by the National Academy of Recording Arts and Sciences of the United States to "honor artistic achievement, technical proficiency and overall excellence in the recording industry, without regard to album sales or chart position".

Originally called the Grammy Award for Best Rock Vocal Performance, Female, the award was first presented to Donna Summer in 1980. Beginning with the 1995 ceremony, the name of the award was changed to Best Female Rock Vocal Performance. However, in 1988, 1992, 1994, and since 2005, this category was combined with the Grammy Award for Best Male Rock Vocal Performance and presented in a genderless category known as Best Rock Vocal Performance, Solo. The solo category was later renamed to Best Solo Rock Vocal Performance beginning in 2005. This fusion has been criticized, especially when female performers are not nominated under the solo category. The Academy has cited a lack of eligible recordings in the female rock category as the reason for the mergers. While the award has not been presented since the category merge in 2005, an official confirmation of its retirement has not been announced.

Pat Benatar, Sheryl Crow, and Tina Turner hold the record for the most wins in this category, with four wins each. Melissa Etheridge and Alanis Morissette have been presented the award two times each. Crow's song "There Goes the Neighborhood" was nominated twice; one version from the album The Globe Sessions was nominated in 1999 (but lost to Morissette's song "Uninvited"), and a live version from the album Sheryl Crow and Friends: Live from Central Park was nominated and won in 2001. Since its inception, American artists have been presented with the award more than any other nationality, though it has been presented to vocalists from Canada three times. Stevie Nicks holds the record for the most nominations without a win, with five.

== Recipients ==
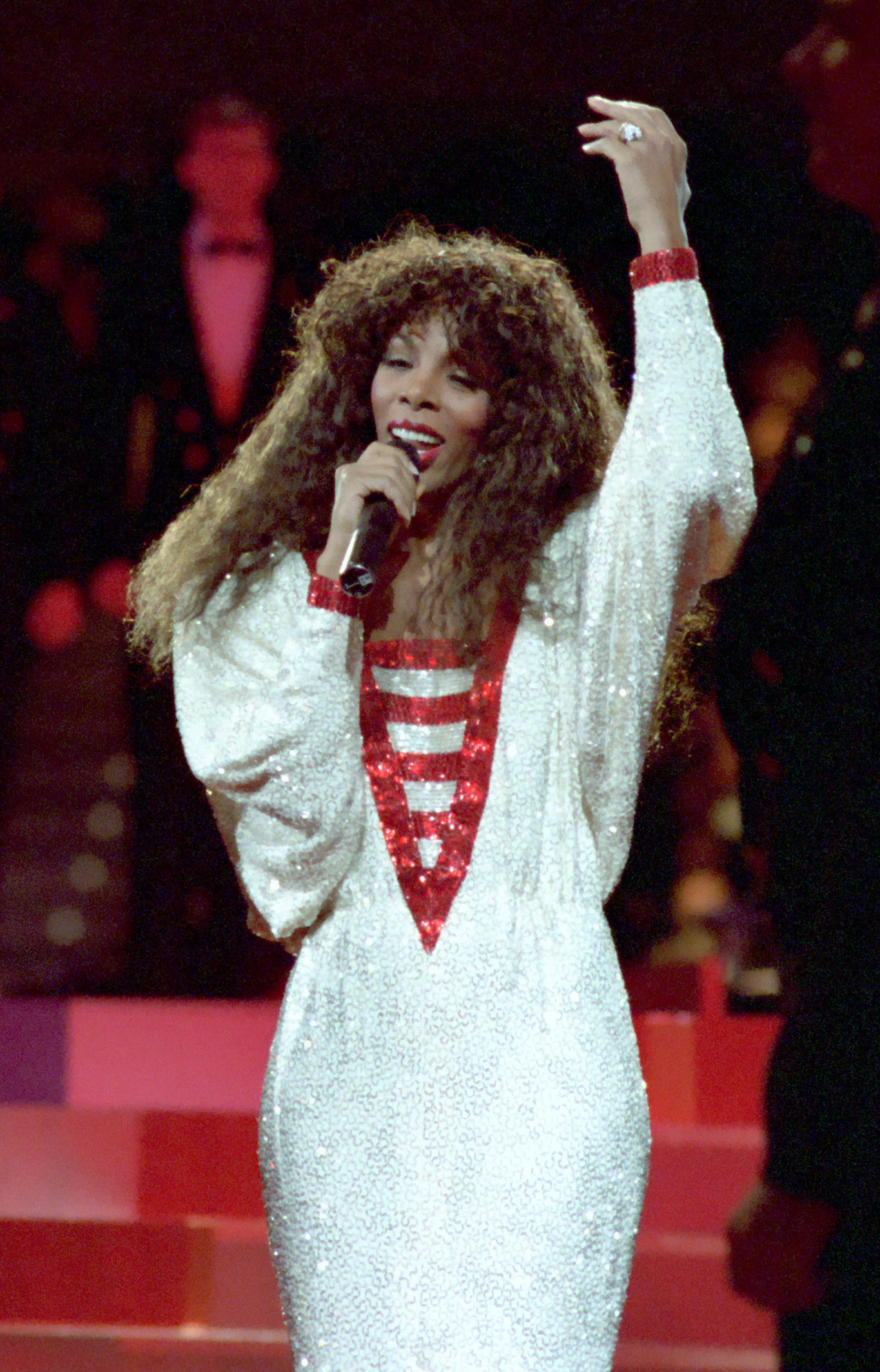
Inaugural award winner and three-time nominee Donna Summer

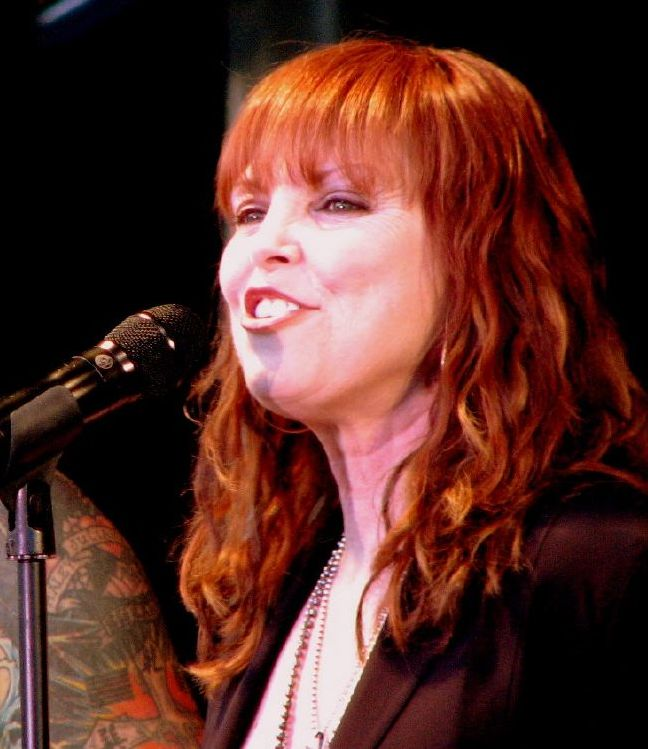
Four-time award winner and eight-time nominee Pat Benatar

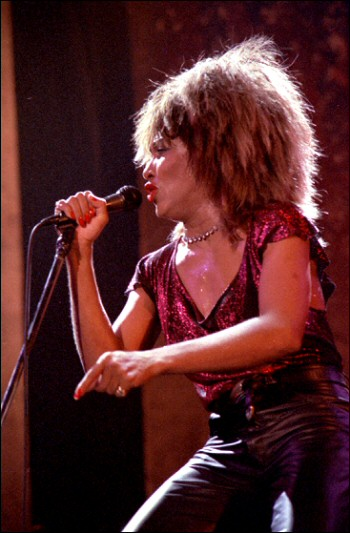
Four-time award winner and seven-time nominee Tina Turner

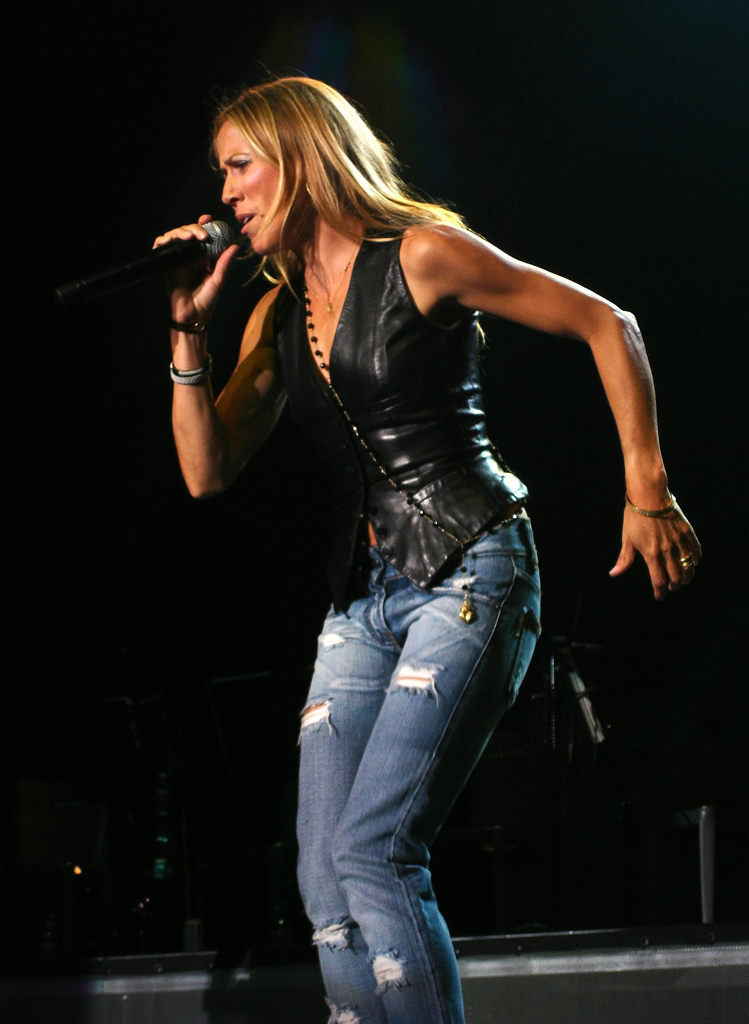
Four-time award winner and six-time nominee Sheryl Crow

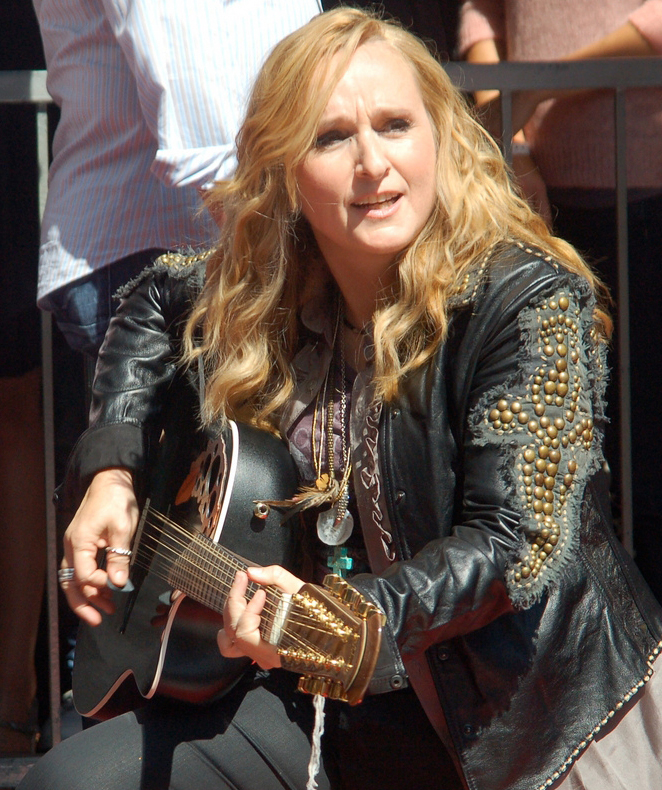
Two-time award winner and nine-time nominee Melissa Etheridge

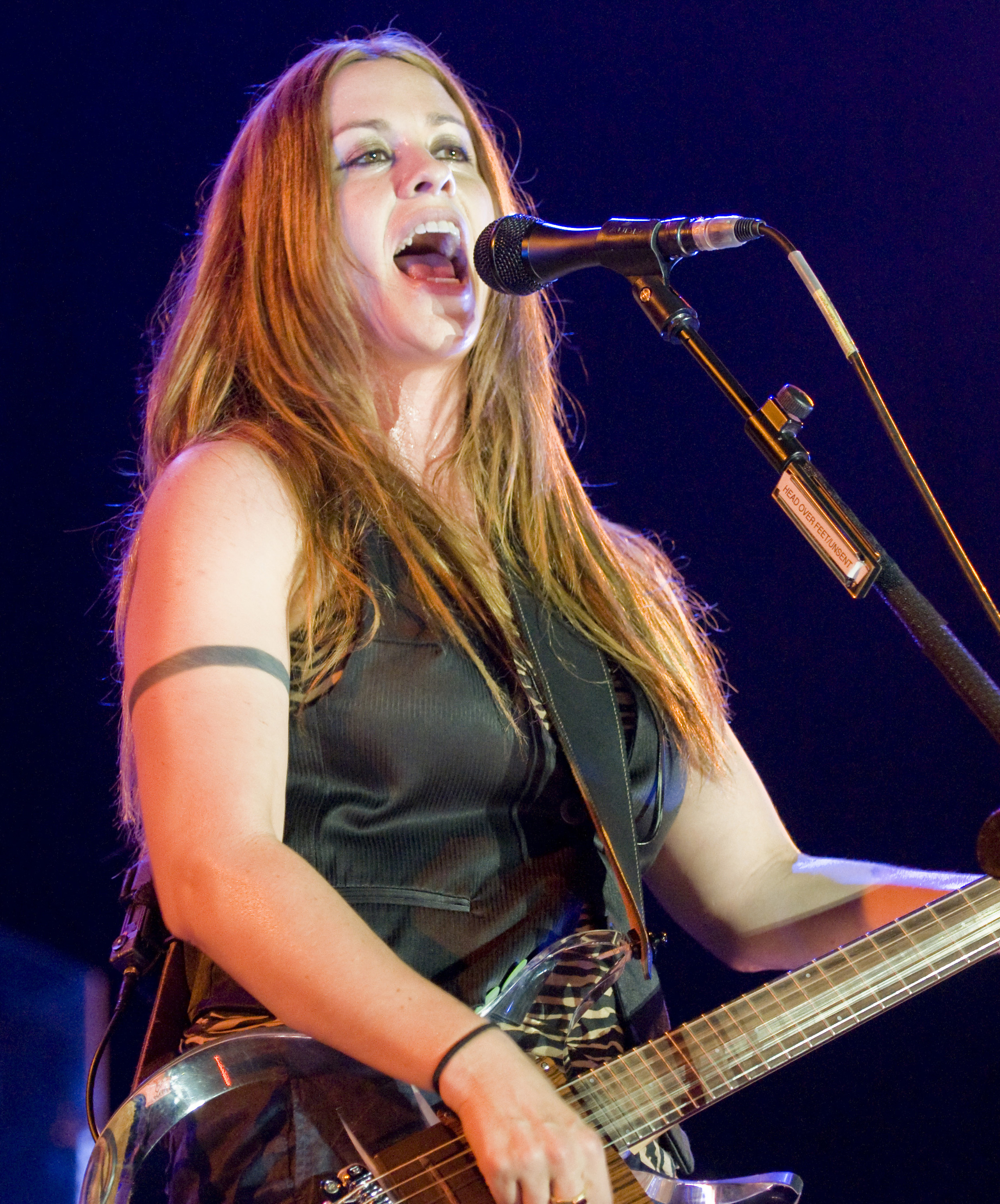
Two-time award winner and three-time nominee Alanis Morissette

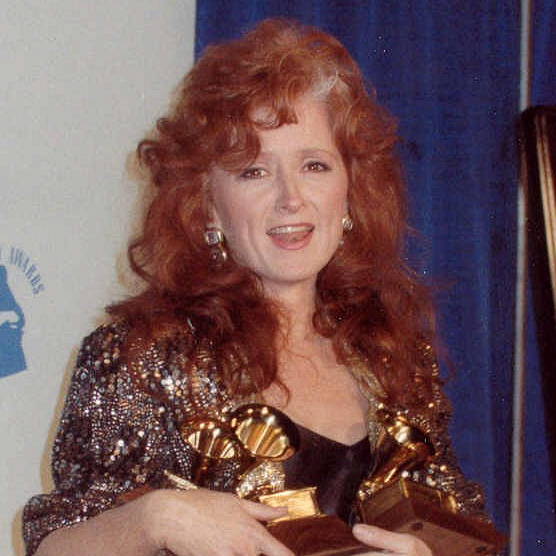
1990 award winner and eight-time nominee Bonnie Raitt

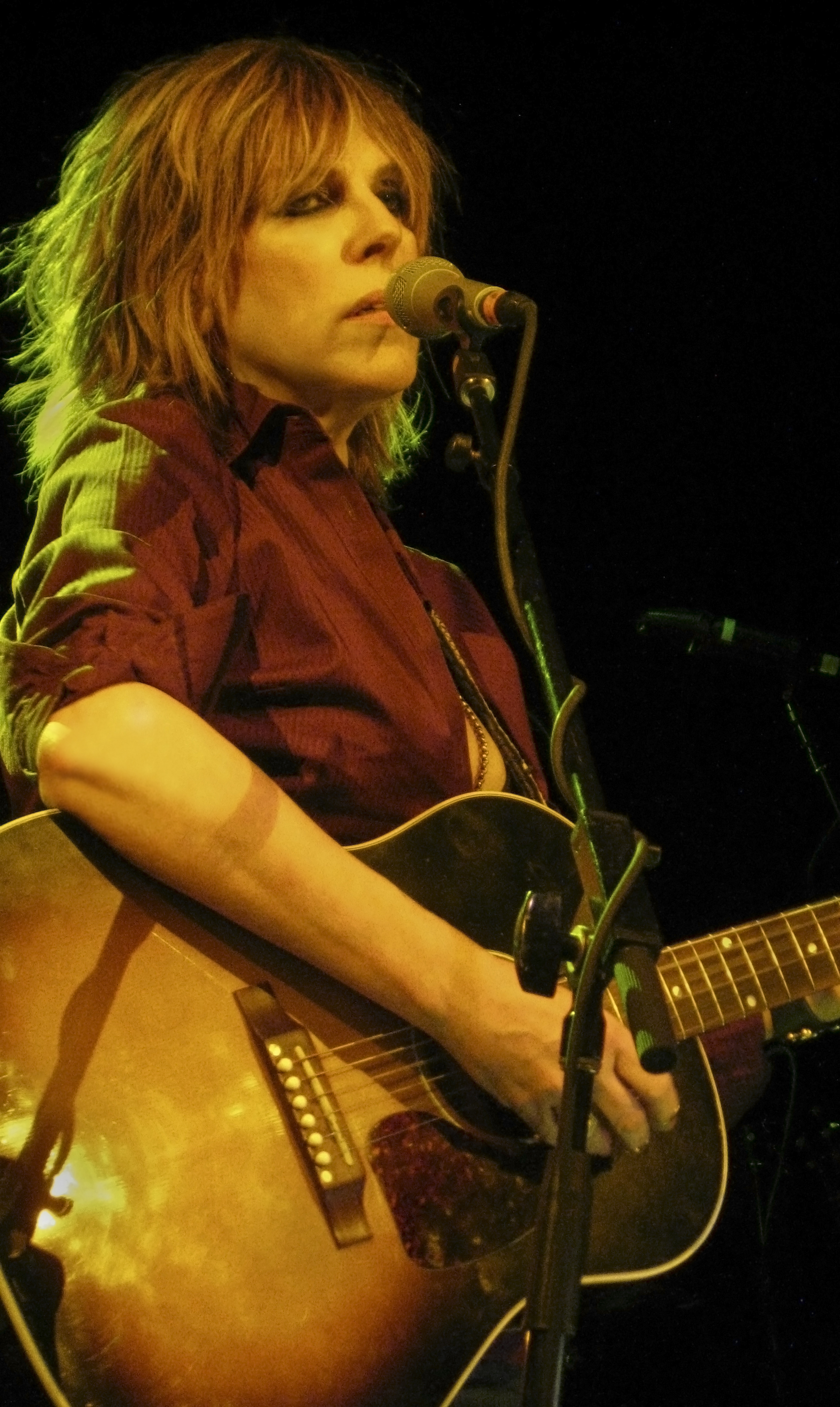
2002 award winner and three-time nominee Lucinda Williams

Year^{[I]}	Winner(s)	Work	Nominees	Ref.
1980	Donna Summer	"Hot Stuff"	Cindy Bullens – "Survivor"; Rickie Lee Jones – "The Last Chance Texaco"; Bonnie Raitt – "You're Gonna Get What's Coming"; Carly Simon – "Vengeance"; Tanya Tucker – TNT	
1981	Pat Benatar	Crimes of Passion	Joan Armatrading – How Cruel; Marianne Faithfull – Broken English; Linda Ronstadt – "How Do I Make You"; Grace Slick – Dreams	
1982	Pat Benatar	"Fire and Ice"	Donna Summer – "Cold Love"; Stevie Nicks – "Edge of Seventeen"; Yoko Ono – "Walking on Thin Ice"; Lulu – "Who's Foolin' Who"	
1983	Pat Benatar	"Shadows of the Night"	Kim Carnes – Voyeur; Linda Ronstadt – "Get Closer"; Bonnie Raitt – Green Light; Donna Summer – "Protection"	
1984	Pat Benatar	"Love Is a Battlefield"	Joan Armatrading – The Key; Kim Carnes – "Invisible Hands"; Stevie Nicks – "Stand Back"; Bonnie Tyler – Faster Than the Speed of Night	
1985	Tina Turner	"Better Be Good to Me"	Lita Ford – Dancin' on the Edge; Bonnie Tyler – "Here She Comes"; Wendy O. Williams – WOW; Pia Zadora – "Rock It Out"	
1986	Tina Turner	"One of the Living"	Pat Benatar – "Invincible"; Melba Moore – "Read My Lips"; Nona Hendryx – "Rock This House"; Cyndi Lauper – "What a Thrill"	
1987	Tina Turner	"Back Where You Started"	Pat Benatar – "Sex as a Weapon"; Cyndi Lauper – "911"; Stevie Nicks – "Talk to Me"; Bonnie Raitt – "No Way to Treat a Lady"	
1988^{[II]}	—N/a	—N/a	—N/a	
1989	Tina Turner	Tina Live in Europe	Pat Benatar – "All Fired Up"; Toni Childs – "Don't Walk Away"; Melissa Etheridge – "Bring Me Some Water"; Sinéad O'Connor – The Lion and the Cobra	
1990	Bonnie Raitt	Nick of Time	Pat Benatar – "Let's Stay Together"; Melissa Etheridge – Brave and Crazy; Cyndi Lauper – "I Drove All Night"; Tina Turner – Foreign Affair	
1991	Alannah Myles	"Black Velvet"	Melissa Etheridge – "The Angels"; Janet Jackson – "Black Cat"; Stevie Nicks – "Whole Lotta Trouble"; Tina Turner – "Steamy Windows"	
1992^{[II]}	—N/a	—N/a	—N/a	
1993	Melissa Etheridge	"Ain't It Heavy"	Lita Ford – "Shot of Poison"; Alison Moyet – "It Won't Be Long"; Alannah Myles – Rockinghorse; Tina Turner – "The Bitch Is Back"	
1994^{[II]}	—N/a	—N/a	—N/a	
1995	Melissa Etheridge	"Come to My Window"	Sheryl Crow – "I'm Gonna Be a Wheel Someday"; Liz Phair – "Supernova"; Sam Phillips – "Circle of Fire"; Bonnie Raitt – "Love Sneakin' Up On You"	
1996	Alanis Morissette	"You Oughta Know"	Toni Childs – "Lay Down Your Pain"; PJ Harvey – "Down by the Water"; Joan Osborne – "St. Teresa"; Liz Phair – "Don't Have Time"	
1997	Sheryl Crow	"If It Makes You Happy"	Tracy Bonham – "Mother Mother"; Tracy Chapman – "Give Me One Reason"; Joan Osborne – "Spider Web"; Bonnie Raitt – "Burning Down the House"	
1998	Fiona Apple	"Criminal"	Meredith Brooks – "Bitch"; Ani DiFranco – "Shy"; Abra Moore – "Four Leaf Clover"; Patti Smith – "1959"	
1999	Alanis Morissette	"Uninvited"	Tori Amos – "Raspberry Swirl"; Sheryl Crow – "There Goes the Neighborhood"; Ani DiFranco – "Glass House"; Lucinda Williams – "Can't Let Go"	
2000	Sheryl Crow	"Sweet Child o' Mine"	Tori Amos – "Bliss"; Ani DiFranco – "Jukebox"; Melissa Etheridge – "Angels Would Fall"; Sarah McLachlan – "Possession" (live)	
2001	Sheryl Crow	"There Goes the Neighborhood (Live)"	Fiona Apple – "Paper Bag"; Melissa Etheridge – "Enough of Me"; Alanis Morissette – "So Pure"; Patti Smith – "Glitter in Their Eyes"	
2002	Lucinda Williams	"Get Right With God"	Tori Amos – "Strange Little Girl"; Melissa Etheridge – "I Want to Be in Love"; PJ Harvey – "This Is Love"; Stevie Nicks – "Planets of the Universe"	
2003	Sheryl Crow	"Steve McQueen"	Melissa Etheridge – "The Weakness in Me"; Avril Lavigne – "Sk8er Boi"; Bonnie Raitt – "Gnawin' on It"; Susan Tedeschi – "Alone"	
2004	Pink	"Trouble"	Michelle Branch – "Are You Happy Now?"; Avril Lavigne – "Losing Grip"; Bonnie Raitt – "Time of Our Lives"; Lucinda Williams – "Righteously"	

^{^[I]} Each year is linked to the article about the Grammy Awards held that year.
^{^[II]} Award was combined with the Best Male Rock Vocal Performance category and presented in a genderless category known as Best Rock Vocal Performance, Solo.

== Multiple wins ==
4 wins

- Pat Benatar
- Tina Turner
- Sheryl Crow

2 wins

- Melissa Etheridge
- Alanis Morissette

== Multiple nominations ==
9 nominations

- Melissa Etheridge

8 nominations

- Bonnie Raitt
- Pat Benatar

7 nominations

- Tina Turner

6 nominations

- Sheryl Crow

5 nominations

- Stevie Nicks

3 nominations

- Donna Summer
- Cyndi Lauper
- Alanis Morissette
- Ani DiFranco
- Tori Amos
- Lucinda Williams

2 nominations

- Joan Armatrading
- Linda Ronstadt
- Kim Carnes
- Bonnie Tyler
- Lita Ford
- Toni Childs
- Alannah Myles
- Liz Phair
- PJ Harvey
- Joan Osborne
- Fiona Apple
- Patti Smith
- Avril Lavigne

== See also ==
- American rock
- List of female rock singers
- List of music awards honoring women
