= Sheryl Crow =

American singer-songwriter (born 1962)

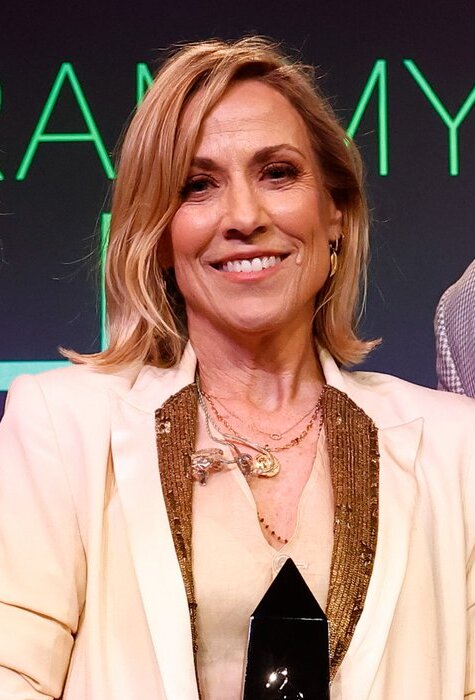
- Crow in 2024

Background information
- Born: Sheryl Suzanne Crow; February 11, 1962 (age 64); Kennett, Missouri, U.S.
- Genres: Rock; country rock; country; pop rock; roots rock; alternative rock
- Occupations: Singer-songwriter; producer; actress; guitarist
- Instruments: Vocals; guitar; keyboards
- Works: Sheryl Crow discography
- Years active: 1987–present
- Labels: A&M; Warner Bros.; Big Machine; Universal; Old Green Barn Productions LLC
- Website: sherylcrow.com

Sheryl Suzanne Crow (born February 11, 1962) is an American singer-songwriter, producer, actress, and guitarist. She is noted for her idealistic and optimistic lyrics, and incorporation of various genres into her rock-oriented sound, including blues, country, folk, and pop.

She has released 12 studio albums, five compilations, and three live albums, and contributed to several film soundtracks. Her most popular songs include "All I Wanna Do" (1994), "Strong Enough" (1994), "If It Makes You Happy" (1996), "Everyday Is a Winding Road" (1996), "Tomorrow Never Dies" (1997), "My Favorite Mistake" (1998), "Picture" (2002, duet with Kid Rock), and "Soak Up the Sun" (2002).

Crow has sold over 50 million albums worldwide and has won nine Grammy Awards from 32 nominations. In 2023 she was inducted into the Rock and Roll Hall of Fame.

In addition to her music career, she has appeared in television series and films, including 30 Rock, Cop Rock, GCB, Cougar Town, One Tree Hill, and NCIS: New Orleans.

== Early life and education ==
Crow was born on February 11, 1962, in Kennett, Missouri, the daughter of Bernice (née Cain), a piano teacher, and Wendell Wyatt Crow, a lawyer and trumpet player. Her great-grandfather was Congressman Charles A. Crow (1873–1938). She has two older sisters, Kathy and Karen, and a younger brother, Steven.

While studying at Kennett High School, Crow was a majorette and an all-state track athlete, winning medals in the 75-meter low hurdles. She also joined the pep club and the National FFA Organization, and was crowned Paperdoll Queen in a celebrity-judged beauty contest during her senior year. She was inducted into the National Honor Society.

She then enrolled at the University of Missouri in Columbia and in 1984 received a BS Ed degree in music education. While at the university, she sang in the local band Cashmere. She was a member of the Kappa Alpha Theta sorority, Sigma Alpha Iota International Music Fraternity for Women, and the Omicron Delta Kappa honor society, as well as working as a summer welcome orientation leader.

== Career ==
=== 1987–1991: Early career ===
After graduating from the University of Missouri, Crow worked as a music teacher at Kellison Elementary School in Fenton, Missouri. Teaching during the day gave her the opportunity to sing in bands on the weekends. She was later introduced to local musician and record producer Jay Oliver. He had a studio in the basement of his parents' home in St. Louis and helped her by using her in advertising jingles. Her first jingle was a back-to-school spot for the St. Louis department store Famous-Barr. Soon after, she sang in commercial jingles for McDonald's and Toyota. She was quoted in a 60 Minutes segment as saying she made $40,000 on the McDonald's ad alone.

Crow toured with Michael Jackson as a backing vocalist during his Bad World Tour 1987–1989, and often performed with Jackson on "I Just Can't Stop Loving You". She also recorded background vocals for Stevie Wonder, Belinda Carlisle, Jimmy Buffett, Kevin Gilbert and Don Henley. Crow played keyboards and sang backing vocals for Gilbert's band Toy Matinee in the early 1990s.

In 1989, Crow contributed backing vocals to the Neal Schon track "Smoke of the Revolution" from his album Late Nite.

Crow also sang in the short-lived Steven Bochco drama Cop Rock series finale in 1990 and her song "Heal Somebody" appeared in the film Bright Angel. In 1991, her recording of "Welcome to the Real Life" featured on the soundtrack to the Brian Bosworth action film Stone Cold. Later that year, her performance of "Hundreds of Tears" was included on the Point Break soundtrack and she sang a duet with Kenny Loggins on the track "I Would Do Anything", from his album Leap of Faith.

=== 1992: Scrapped debut album ===
In 1992, Crow recorded her first attempt at a debut album with Sting's record producer Hugh Padgham. The self-titled debut album was due to be released in September 1992, but Crow and her label mutually decided that the album did not merit release. Crow described it as "too produced" and "slick". However, a handful of cassette copies of the album were leaked, along with press folders for album publicity. This album has been widely dispersed via file sharing networks and fan trading. In the meantime, Crow's songs were recorded by major artists such as Celine Dion, Tina Turner and Wynonna Judd.

=== 1994–1997: International success ===
Crow began dating Kevin Gilbert and joined him in an ad hoc group of musicians known to themselves as the "Tuesday Music Club". The group existed as a casual songwriting collective prior to its association with Crow; however, it rapidly developed into a vehicle for her debut album after Crow's arrival. Group members Gilbert, David Baerwald, and David Ricketts (both formerly of David & David), Bill Bottrell, Brian MacLeod, and Dan Schwartz share songwriting credits with Crow on her debut album, Tuesday Night Music Club, released in 1993. Her relationship with Gilbert became acrimonious soon after the album was released, and disputes arose about songwriting credits. Tuesday Night Music Club featured many of the songs written by Crow's friends, including the second single, "Leaving Las Vegas". The album was slow to garner attention, until "All I Wanna Do" became an unexpected smash hit in October 1994. The singles "Strong Enough" and "Can't Cry Anymore" were also released, with the first song ("Strong Enough") charting at No. 5 on the Billboard Hot 100 and "Can't Cry Anymore" hitting the Top 40. Tuesday Night Music Club went on to sell more than 7 million copies in the US and UK during the 1990s. The album also won Crow three Grammys at the 37th Annual Grammy Awards in 1995: Record of the Year, Best New Artist and Best Female Pop Vocal Performance.

Crow performed at the 1994 Woodstock Festival and appeared in the "New Faces" section of Rolling Stone in 1994. She also supplied background vocals to the song "The Garden of Allah" from Don Henley's 1995 album Actual Miles: Henley's Greatest Hits.

In 1996, Crow released her self-titled second album. She produced the album herself and also played a variety of instruments, from various guitars, bass or pedal steel to various organs and piano. The debut single, "If It Makes You Happy", became a radio success and netted her two Grammys for Best Female Rock Vocal Performance and Best Rock Album at the 39th Annual Grammy Awards in 1997. Other singles included "A Change Would Do You Good", "Home", and "Everyday Is a Winding Road". The album was banned from sale at Walmart, because in the lyrics to "Love Is a Good Thing" Crow says that Walmart sells guns to children. The album also features a protest song called "Redemption Day", which was covered by Johnny Cash on his posthumous album American VI: Ain't No Grave.

Crow performed at Another Roadside Attraction in 1997. Also in 1997, Crow contributed the theme song to the James Bond film Tomorrow Never Dies. Her song "Tomorrow Never Dies" was nominated for a Best Song Written Specifically for a Motion Picture or for Television at the 41st Annual Grammy Awards and Best Original Song at the 55th Golden Globe Awards.

=== 1998–1999: The Globe Sessions and live album ===
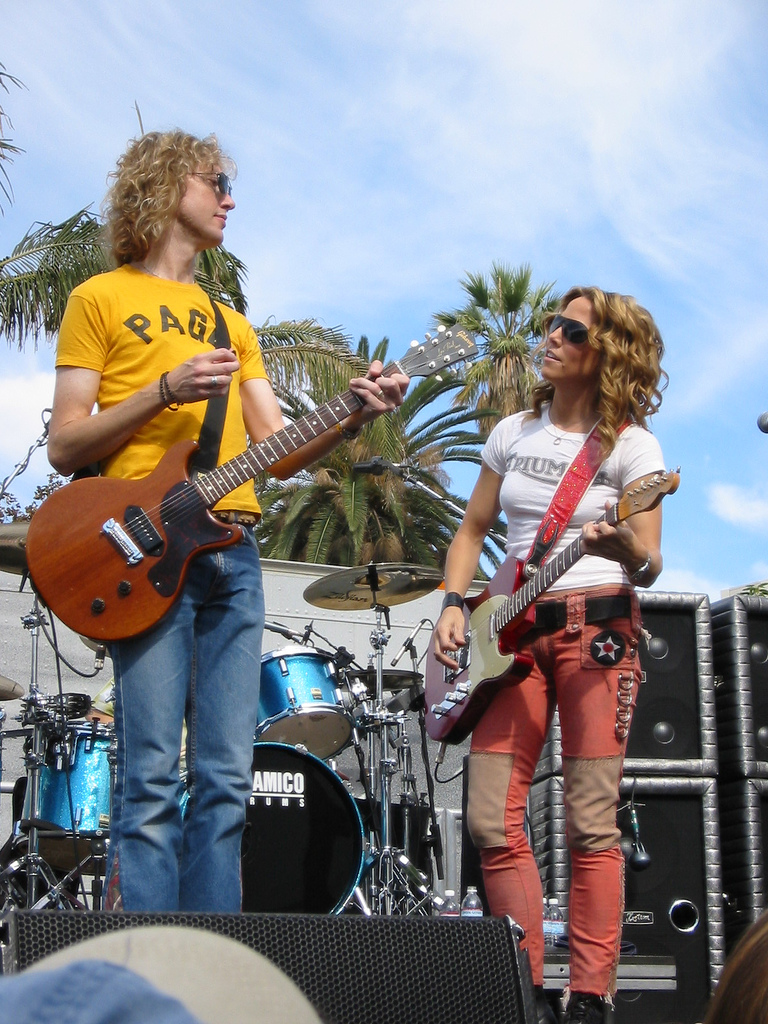
Crow at The Grove of Los Angeles, California in 2002, with guitarist Peter Stroud

Crow collaborated on Scott Weiland's 1998 album, 12 Bar Blues. Also in 1998, Crow released The Globe Sessions. During this period, she discussed in interviews having gone through a deep depression, and there was speculation about a brief affair with Eric Clapton. The debut single from this album, "My Favorite Mistake", was rumored to be about Clapton, but Crow says otherwise—that the song is about a philandering ex-boyfriend. Crow has refused to say who the song was about, telling Billboard magazine on the release of her album, "Oh, there will be just so much speculation, and because of that there's great safety and protection in the fact that people will be guessing so many different people and I'm the only person who will ever really know. I'm really private about who I've had relationships with, and I don't talk about them in the press. I don't even really talk about them with the people around me." Despite the difficulties in recording the album, Crow told the BBC in 2005 that, "My favorite single is 'My Favorite Mistake'. It was a lot of fun to record and it's still a lot of fun to play." The album won Best Rock Album at the 41st Annual Grammy Awards in 1999. It was re-released in 1999, with a bonus track, Crow's cover of the Guns N' Roses song "Sweet Child o' Mine", which was included on the soundtrack of the film Big Daddy. The song won a Grammy for Best Female Rock Vocal Performance at the 42nd Annual Grammy Awards in 2000. Other singles included "There Goes the Neighborhood", "Anything but Down", and "The Difficult Kind". Crow's live recording of "There Goes the Neighborhood" won a Grammy for Best Female Rock Vocal Performance at the 43rd Annual Grammy Awards in 2001. The Globe Sessions peaked at No. 5 on the Billboard 200 chart, achieving US sales of 2 million as of January 2008. Later in 1998, Crow took part in a live concert in tribute to Burt Bacharach, contributing vocals on "One Less Bell to Answer".

In 1999, Crow also made her acting debut as an ill-fated drifter in the suspense/drama The Minus Man, which starred her then-boyfriend Owen Wilson as a serial killer. Also in 1999, she appeared in Prince's album Rave Un2 the Joy Fantastic, singing backing vocals in the song "Baby Knows". Prince included a cover of her "Everyday Is a Winding Road" in the album. She also appeared in Zucchero Fornaciari's collection Overdose d'amore/The Ballads featuring the song "Blue" (co-written by Bono).

She also released a live album called Sheryl Crow and Friends: Live From Central Park. The record featured Crow singing many of her hit singles with new musical spins and guest appearances by many other musicians including Sarah McLachlan, Stevie Nicks, the Dixie Chicks, Keith Richards, and Eric Clapton. It included her Grammy winning performance of "There Goes the Neighborhood".

=== 2002–2004: C'mon, C'mon and The Very Best of Sheryl Crow ===
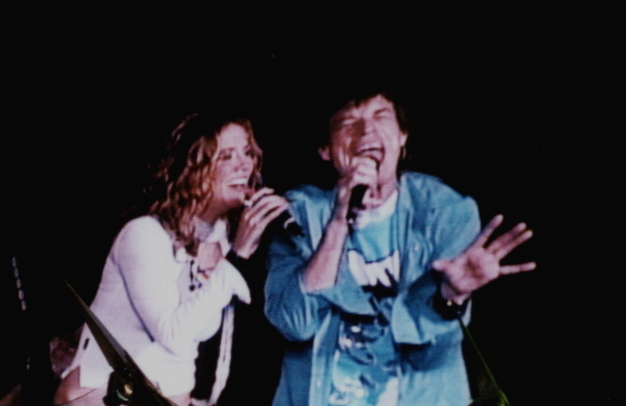
Crow and Mick Jagger on stage during a Rolling Stones concert in 2002

Crow has been involved with the Scleroderma Research Foundation (SRF) since the late 1990s, performing at fund-raisers and befriending Sharon Monsky. In 2002, as a result of her friend Kent Sexton dying from scleroderma, she interrupted work on her new album C'mon, C'mon to record the traditional hymn "Be Still, My Soul", to be played at his funeral. In November of that year it was released as a single, with the proceeds going to SRF.

Her fourth studio album, C'mon, C'mon, was released in 2002, spawning the hit single "Soak Up the Sun". The second single, "Steve McQueen", won the Female Rock Vocal Performance Grammy at the 45th Annual Grammy Awards in 2003.

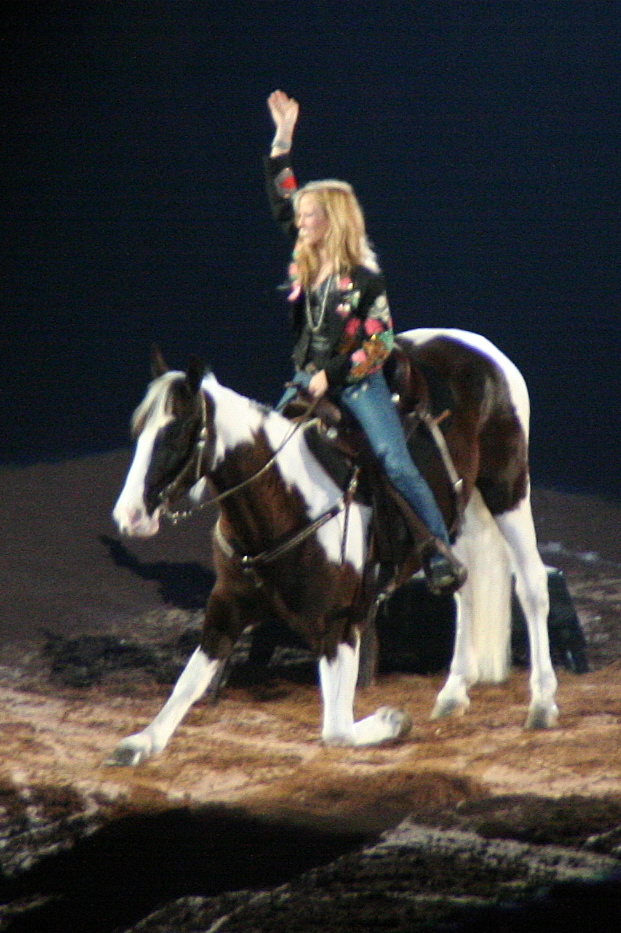
Crow at the Houston Livestock Show and Rodeo in 2007

Crow opposed the 2003 invasion of Iraq, wearing a shirt that read "I don't believe in your war, Mr. Bush!" during a performance on Good Morning America and posting an open letter explaining her opposition on her website. At a performance with Kid Rock at the 45th Annual Grammy Awards, she wore a large peace sign and a guitar strap with the words "No War". She showed support for injured soldiers in 2003 by playing her guitar and singing to individual patients at Walter Reed Army Medical Center.

She recorded the song "Kiss That Girl" for the film Bridget Jones's Diary. She also recorded a cover version of The Beatles' song "Mother Nature's Son" for the film I Am Sam. Crow sang a duet with rock artist Kid Rock on the crossover hit single "Picture", from Kid Rock's 2001 album Cocky. She also assisted him on the track "Run Off to LA".

Crow collaborated with Michelle Branch on the song "Love Me Like That" for Branch's second album, Hotel Paper, released in 2003.

She was featured on the Johnny Cash album American III: Solitary Man on the song "Field of Diamonds" as a background vocalist, and also played the accordion for the songs "Wayfaring Stranger" and "Mary of the Wild Moor".

In 2003, a greatest hits compilation called The Very Best of Sheryl Crow was released. It featured many of her hit singles, as well as some new tracks. Among them was the 1960s pop song, "The First Cut Is the Deepest" by Cat Stevens, which became her biggest radio hit since "All I Wanna Do". She also released the single "Light in Your Eyes", which received limited airplay. "The First Cut Is the Deepest" earned her two awards for Favorite Pop/Rock Female Artist and Favorite Adult Contemporary Artist at the American Music Awards of 2004.

In 2004, Crow appeared as a musical theater performer in the Cole Porter biographical film De-Lovely.

=== 2005–2007: Wildflower ===
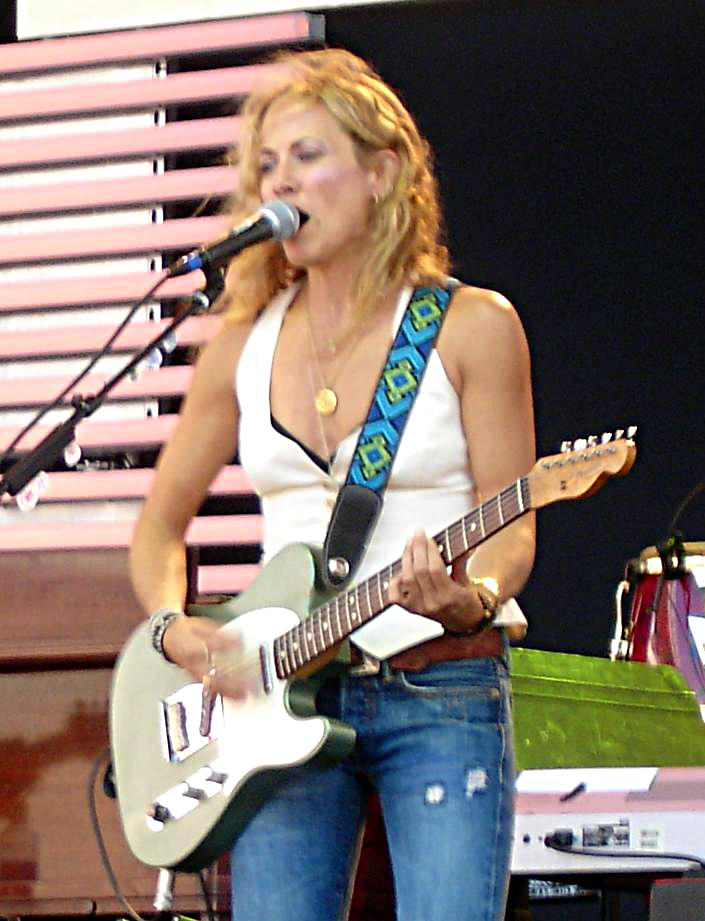
Crow at Crossroads 2007

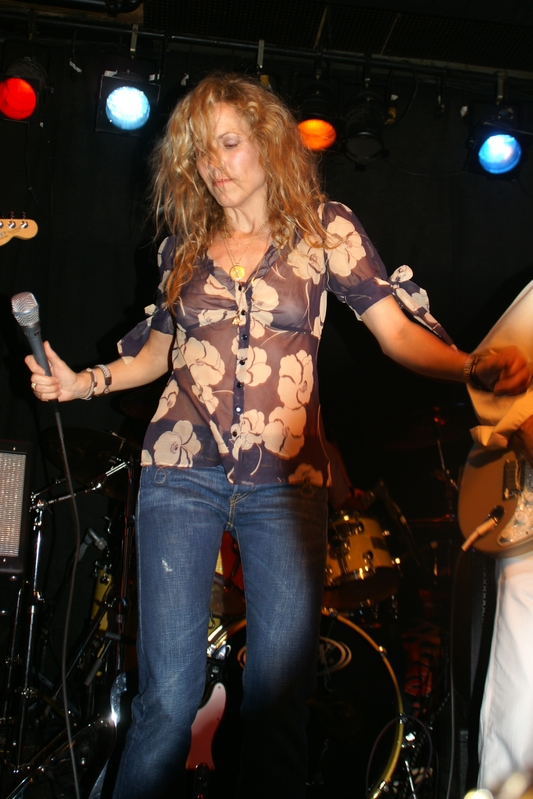
Crow in Memphis, Tennessee, on August 18, 2007

Her fifth studio album, Wildflower, was released in September 2005. Although the album debuted at No. 2 on the Billboard charts, it received mixed reviews and was not as commercially successful as her previous albums. In December 2005, the album was nominated for a Grammy Award for Best Pop Vocal Album, while Crow was nominated for a Best Female Pop Vocal Performance Grammy for the first single "Good Is Good" at the 48th Grammy Awards. However, she ultimately lost in both categories to Kelly Clarkson. The album got a new boost in 2006 when the second single was announced as "Always on Your Side", re-recorded with British musician Sting and sent off to radio, where it was quickly embraced on Adult Top 40. The collaboration with Sting resulted in a Grammy nomination for Best Pop Collaboration With Vocals at the 49th Grammy Awards. As of January 2008, Wildflower has sold 949,000 units in the United States.

Also in 2005, Crow contributed "Real Gone", the opening track to the soundtrack for Disney and Pixar's 2006 animated film Cars. Crow was diagnosed with early-stage breast cancer in mid-February 2006, her doctors stating that, "Prognosis for a full recovery is excellent."

Crow's first concert after her cancer diagnosis was on May 18 of that year in Orlando, Florida, where she played to over 10,000 information technology professionals at the SAP Sapphire Convention. Her first public appearance was on June 12, when she performed at the Murat Theater in Indianapolis, Indiana. She also appeared on Larry King Live on CNN on August 23, 2006. In this show, she talked about her comeback, her breakup with Lance Armstrong, her past job as Michael Jackson's backup singer, and her experience as a breast cancer survivor.

In late 2006, Crow was nominated for a Best Original Song Golden Globe Award for the song Try Not To Remember from the film Home of the Brave at the 64th Golden Globe Awards.

In early 2007, Crow was scheduled to sing at an annual benefit concert for the Cardinal Glennon Children's Hospital that sportscaster Bob Costas hosts every year. Her performance was opposed by Catholic Archbishop Raymond Leo Burke due to her position on abortion. Burke resigned as chair of the medical center's board of governors when Crow's appearance was confirmed.

Crow wrote a foreword for the book Crazy Sexy Cancer Tips, a book written by Kris Carr that was based on her 2007 documentary film Crazy Sexy Cancer. Crow contributed her cover of the Beatles' "Here Comes the Sun" on the soundtrack for the DreamWorks animated film Bee Movie in November 2007. She contributed background vocals to Ryan Adams's song "Two" from his album Easy Tiger.

=== 2008–2009: Detours ===
Crow returned with her sixth studio album Detours, which was released on February 5, 2008. Detours debuted at No. 2 on the US Billboard 200 chart selling close to 92,000 copies in its first week and an additional 52,000 copies in its second week. In support of the new album, Crow launched a 25-date tour with James Blunt, and the lineup included reggae group Toots and the Maytals after being handpicked by Crow who said they are one of her favorite bands.

Detours was recorded at Crow's Nashville, Tennessee farm. Her son, Wyatt, makes an appearance on the song "Lullaby for Wyatt", which is featured in the movie Grace Is Gone.

"Shine Over Babylon" was the first promotional single from the album (download only). The first official single released from the album was "Love Is Free", followed by "Out of Our Heads". As of 2010, Detours had sold more than 700,000 copies worldwide.

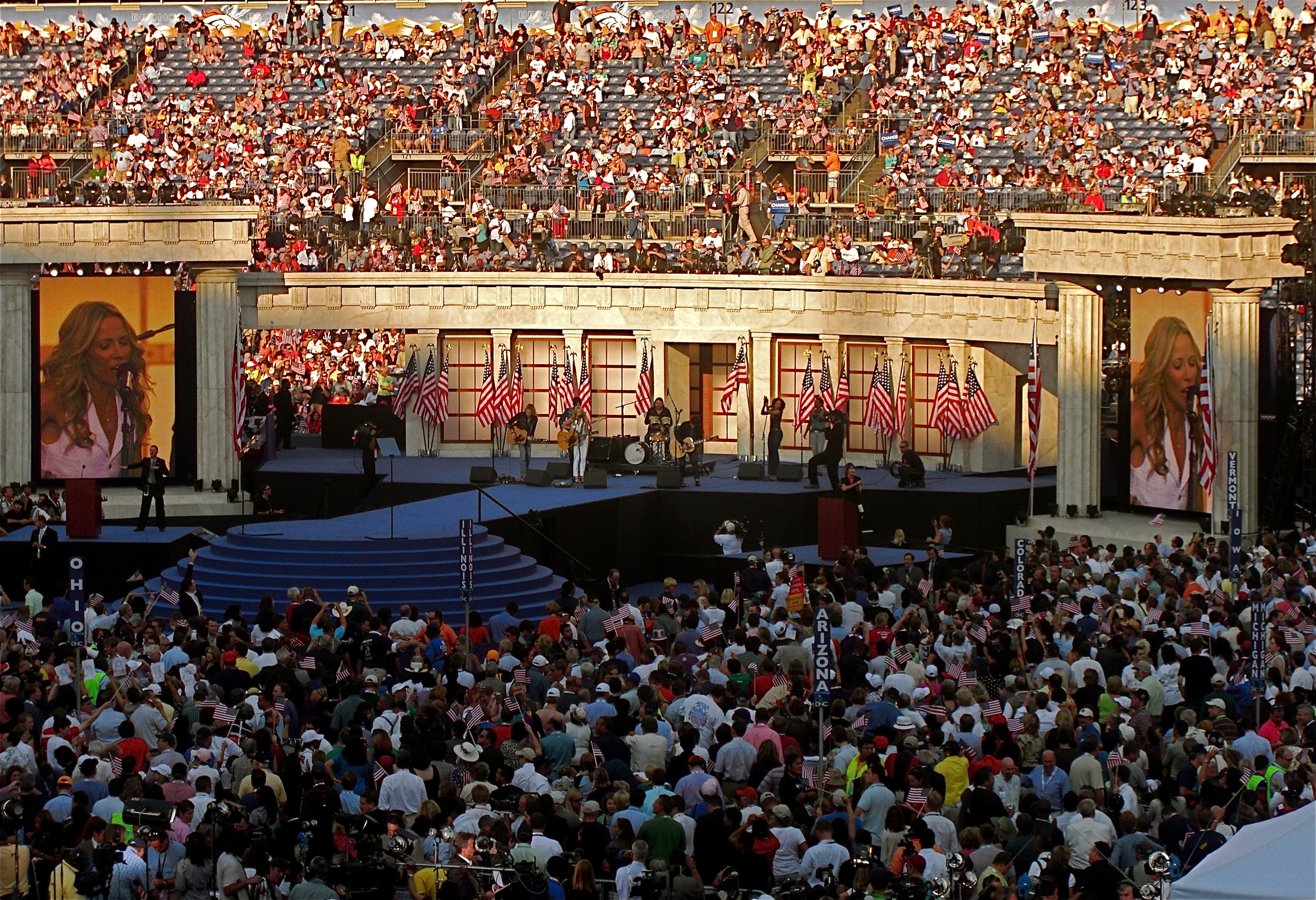
Crow performing during the final day of the 2008 Democratic National Convention in Denver, Colorado

Crow endorsed Barack Obama in the 2008 United States presidential election and later performed on the fourth and last day of the 2008 Democratic National Convention.

Crow also recorded a studio version of "So Glad We Made It" for the AT&T Team USA Soundtrack, in conjunction with the 2008 US Olympic team sponsors, AT&T.

A&M Records re-released Crow's debut album, Tuesday Night Music Club, as a deluxe version 2CD/DVD set on November 17, 2009. The released included the single "Killer Life", which charted moderately in adult album alternative radio. The bonus CD contains unreleased songs and B-sides, and a new mix of "I Shall Believe". The DVD features music videos for each of the album's singles.

In August 2008, Crow (in partnership with Western Glove Works) launched a jeans brand, Bootheel Trading Company.

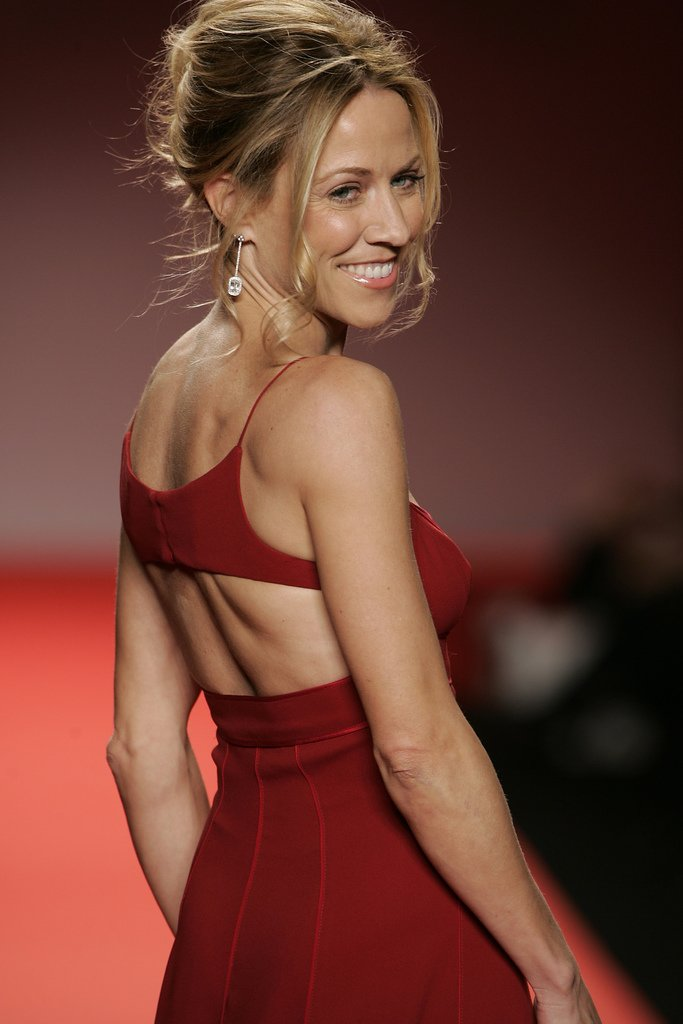
Crow at New York Fashion Week in February 2005

On April 4, 2009, Crow, who practices Transcendental Meditation, took part in a benefit concert at the Radio City Music Hall in New York City organized by the David Lynch Foundation supporting the Foundation's goal of teaching one million at-risk students to meditate. She and Ben Harper performed George Harrison's "My Sweet Lord". Other performers at the concert included Paul McCartney, Ringo Starr, Mike Love, Moby, Eddie Vedder and Donovan.

=== 2010–2012: 100 Miles from Memphis ===
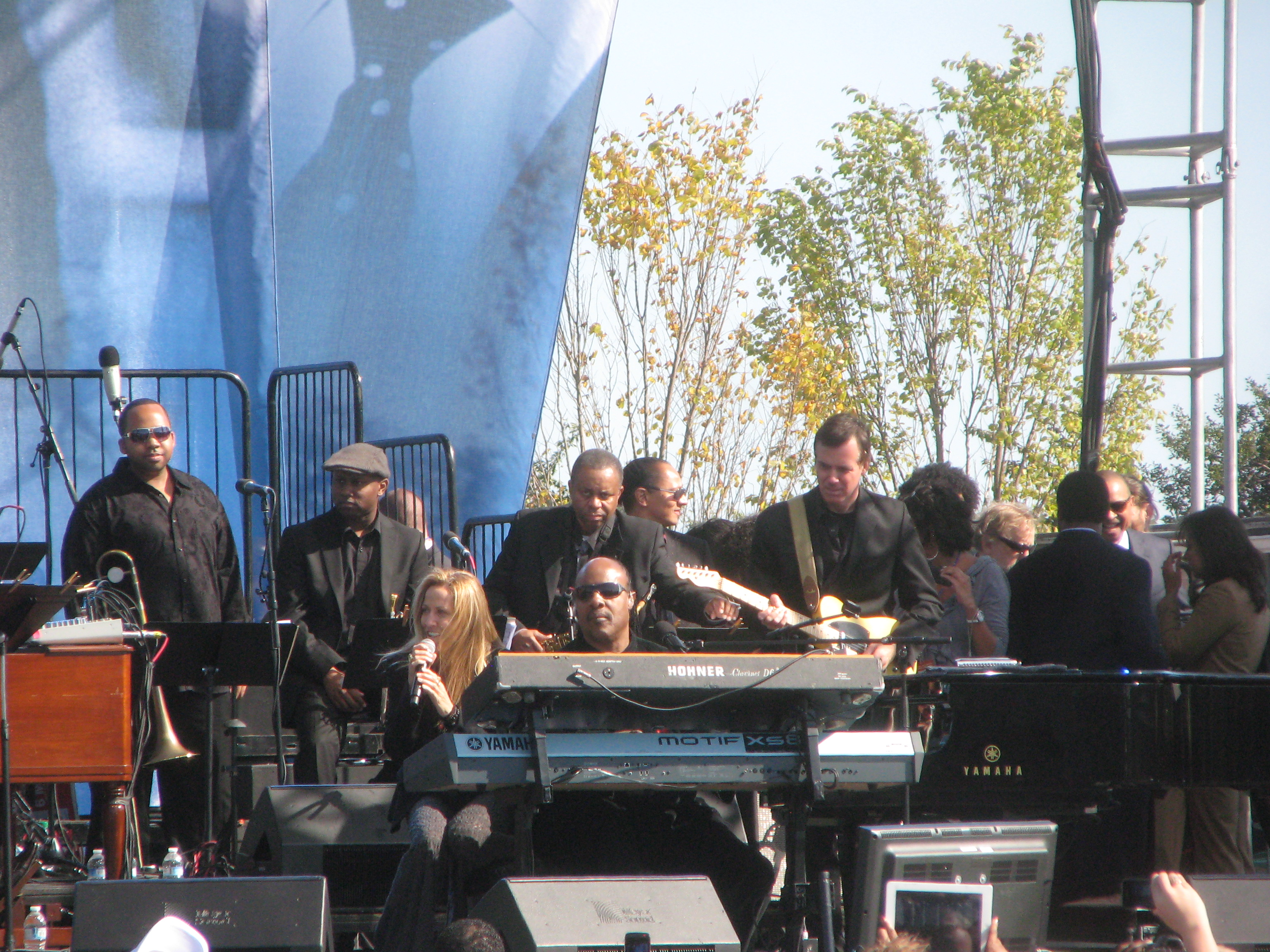
Crow with Stevie Wonder at the dedication concert for the Martin Luther King Jr. Memorial on October 16, 2011

In 2010, Crow contributed the original spoken-word track "My Name Is Mwamaroyi" to the Enough Project and Downtown Records' Raise Hope for Congo compilation. Proceeds from the compilation fund efforts to make the protection and empowerment of Congo's women a priority, as well as inspire individuals around the world to raise their voice for peace in Congo.

A&M Records released Crow's seventh studio album, 100 Miles from Memphis, on July 20, 2010. The album had a Memphis soul sound and featured the lead single "Summer Day".

Later that year, she joined country singers Loretta Lynn and Miranda Lambert on an update of Lynn's song "Coal Miner's Daughter" for the 2010 album Coal Miner's Daughter: A Tribute to Loretta Lynn. They later performed the song at the 2010 Country Music Association Awards in November.

In October 2010, she performed at Jon Stewart's and Stephen Colbert's Rally to Restore Sanity and/or Fear

In July 2011, Crow performed at the opening night of the Cheyenne Frontier Days Rodeo. Animal welfare campaigners had urged her not to, alleging animal cruelty at the event. Almost 13,000 people signed a petition calling on Crow not to perform.

On September 20, 2011, it was announced that Crow will write the music and lyrics for Diner, a new musical inspired by the critically acclaimed 1982 film Diner. The show initially had an intended run on Broadway planned for the fall of 2012 though it eventually opened in Arlington County, Virginia in 2014 and was directed and choreographed by Tony Award winner Kathleen Marshall.

On October 11, 2011, William Shatner released the album Seeking Major Tom, on which Crow sang the track "Mrs. Major Tom" by electronic music artist KIA, released in 2003 on the album Adieu Shinjuku Zulu.

On September 21, 2012, Mailboat Records released Mark Twain: Words & Music, an Americana double-CD that tells the life of fellow Missourian Mark Twain in spoken word and song. The project was a benefit for the Mark Twain Boyhood Home & Museum in Hannibal, Missouri. Crow sang the only period piece song on the project, Stephen Foster's "Beautiful Dreamer". The song was sung a cappella and accompanied the narrative describing the early days of Mark Twain's young family in Hartford, Connecticut. Other performers that joined the project, produced by Carl Jackson, included Jimmy Buffett, Clint Eastwood, Garrison Keillor, Brad Paisley, Emmylou Harris, Vince Gill, Ricky Skaggs, and others. AirPlay Direct reported the project as its most downloaded Americana album.

In September 2012, Crow was featured in a campaign called 30 Songs/30 Days to support Half the Sky: Turning Oppression into Opportunity for Women Worldwide, a multi-platform media project inspired by Nicholas Kristof and Sheryl WuDunn's book.

Crow was invited by journalist Katie Couric to write the theme song for her new talk-show, Katie. The song, titled "This Day", was nominated for a Daytime Emmy Award in the category Outstanding Original Song.

On November 1, 2012, Crow released an original song she called "Woman in the White House" that was made available for a free download. As the title suggests, the country-flavored tune defends the idea of a woman president. Mixed reviews from critics ranged from "sort of patronizing and gender essentialist" to "good-natured and well-intentioned". The song, praised for its tongue-in-cheek lyrics, was commented on by country singer Brad Paisley, who characterized it as "all in good fun". The song was later released for digital download on iTunes and a portion of the proceeds were donated to the American Red Cross to aid in the recovery effort in the wake of Hurricane Sandy.

Also in 2012, VH1 ranked Crow at No. 25 as one of the 100 Greatest Women in Music.

=== 2013–2015: Feels Like Home ===
In 2011, Crow separated from her label, A&M Records. The singer followed Nashville neighbor Brad Paisley's advice and, after being introduced to producer Justin Niebank and several Nashville-based songwriters such as Chris DuBois, Luke Laird and Chris Stapleton, she started her first country music project in 2013.

In 2013, Crow signed a recording contract with Warner Music Nashville and, a few months later, released "Easy", the first single from the upcoming album, which became her first top twenty country radio hit and her highest charting lead single since 2005. Feels Like Home was released on September 10, 2013, and debuted at number seven on the Billboard 200 with first-week sales of over 36,000 copies, becoming Crow's ninth top ten album.

Crow was one of the opening acts for George Strait's 2014 leg of The Cowboy Rides Away Tour. Along with Stevie Nicks, Bonnie Raitt, Emmylou Harris and Carrie Underwood, she made an appearance at the Rock and Roll Hall of Fame induction ceremony, paying tribute to Linda Ronstadt, who was one of the inductees of 2014. Crow, along with country band Gloriana, joined Rascal Flatts on their Rewind Tour, which kicked off May 16, 2014.

The 40th anniversary celebration benefit concert of the Austin City Limits television show was held on June 26, 2014, and televised later that year. Crow hosted the event along with Jeff Bridges and performed with Kris Kristofferson, Gary Clark Jr., Alabama Shakes, as well as her former guitarist Doyle Bramhall II. Crow sang on a rendition of "Baby, It's Cold Outside" that appeared on Darius Rucker's Christmas album, Home for the Holidays. In December 2015, she covered "A Hard Day's Night" at the John Lennon 75th Birthday Concert, and performed "Two More Bottles of Wine" with Vince Gill at another tribute concert: "The Life & Songs of Emmylou Harris".

=== 2017–2022: Be Myself, Threads and Sheryl ===
Crow duets with Americana artist Rodney Crowell on the track "I'm Tied To Ya" from his album Close Ties which was released in March 2017. Crow's tenth studio album, Be Myself, was released on April 21, 2017. It was co-produced by Crow, Jeff Trott and Tchad Blake, and is the first time the latter has appeared on one of Crow's studio albums since The Globe Sessions in 1998. Be Myself was described by Crow as a return to the sound of her nineties work, and intentionally eschews the country-influenced sound of her previous album. In an interview with Rolling Stone, Crow said that she did not enjoy the country radio promotional process: "It was more political than I expected... You do lots of free [shows] for radio stations in trade for getting played between three and four in the morning. And that's just not how other formats work, and that goes against my grain. I'm too old to allow that for myself, and to spend any night away from my kid for that is not justified."

Crow's 2019 album Threads features contributions from, among others, Don Henley, Joe Walsh, Sting, Stevie Nicks, Willie Nelson, and Keith Richards. While promoting her UK tour, Crow released "Wouldn't Wanna Be Like You" featuring St. Vincent and revealed that she intended for Threads to be her final album, citing the impossibility of releasing something that could follow-up such a gathering of artists. She added that she would continue to write and tour and would potentially release short-form music akin to extended plays.

In 2019, it was reported that Crow was among hundreds of artists whose material had been destroyed in the 2008 Universal fire. Crow had initially told BBC News that the master and safety back-ups for her first seven albums were lost in the fire. However, in a 2022 interview with The Line of Best Fit, Crow revealed that her masters had in fact not been lost, stating that "luckily, they found most of mine in a different area." In 2022, Sheryl, a Showtime documentary film directed by Amy Scott chronicling her career, premiered at the South by Southwest film festival.

=== 2023–present: Evolution and Pick You Up ===
Crow announced that she recorded a new studio album, her twelfth, Evolution, on November 3, 2023. The news arrived just ahead of her induction into the Rock and Roll Hall of Fame that same day. The album was released March 29, 2024. It was preceded by the single "Alarm Clock". Also in 2024, she contributed guitar to a re-release of Mark Knopfler's "Going Home: Theme of the Local Hero" in aid of the Teenage Cancer Trust. On October 25, 2024, she released the single "Light A Candle", proceeds of which would be donated to the American Red Cross, supporting communities affected by hurricanes and tropical storms in 2024, including Hurricanes Helene and Milton.

On May 23, 2025, Crow released the single "I Know", in aid of Mental Health Awareness Month.

On July 18, 2025, Crow released a single "The New Normal" that was written by Crow and her longtime touring band "The Real Lowdown". A week later, on July 25, 2025, Crow released another single written by her and the group, "See You On The Other Side".

On August 14, 2026, Crow announced her thirteenth studio album Pick You Up, which was released on October 9, 2026.

== Musical style ==
Crow's music has been categorized as rock, country rock, pop rock, roots rock, and alternative rock. Her music also incorporates elements of blues, country, folk pop and alternative rock, with an idealistic and optimistic attitude.

== Instruments and signature model guitars ==
Early in her career, Crow performed extensively with a 1964 Gibson Country Western guitar which was her personal favorite, but she eventually feared that it would not stand up to the rigors of continued touring and stage use, and in 1999 asked Gibson to build her a replica for use on stage. The manufacturer responded by introducing a "Sheryl Crow" model in their Signature Artist Series, which is essentially a re-creation of the square-shouldered 1962-era Country Western model. In 2013, Gibson also introduced a limited edition "Sheryl Crow Southern Jumbo", a reissue of the slope-shouldered predecessor of the 1962-era Country Western.

== Personal life ==
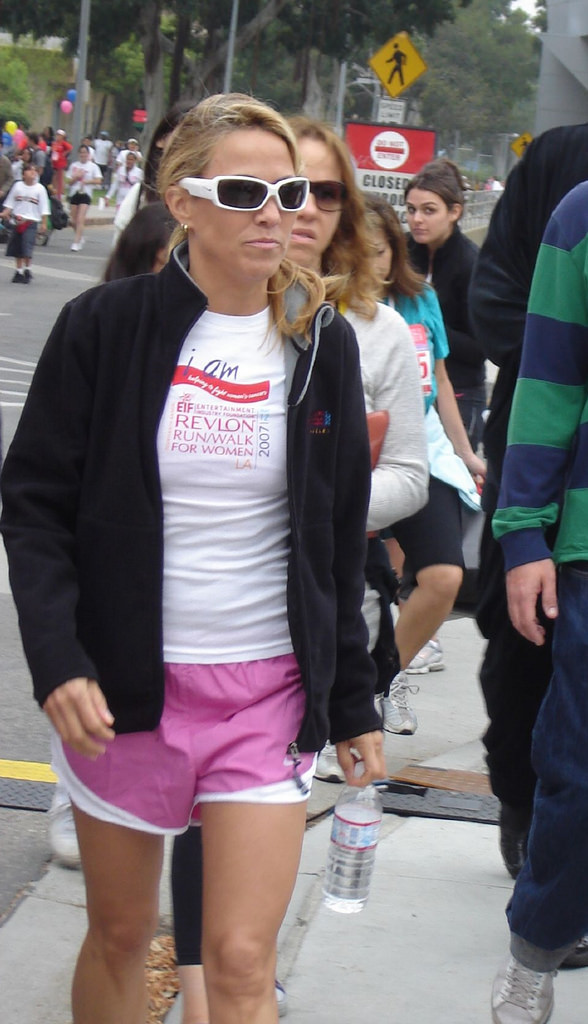
Crow at the Revlon Run Walk 2007

=== Relationships and family ===
Crow has had several high-profile romantic relationships. In the late 1990s, she dated musician Eric Clapton and actor Owen Wilson. The song "Safe and Sound" on the album C'mon, C'mon was dedicated to Wilson and, according to the album's liner notes, was an account of their relationship. Crow began dating cyclist Lance Armstrong in 2003. The couple announced their engagement in September 2005, but jointly announced they had split on February 3, 2006. According to Crow, she has been engaged two other times but never married.

In May 2007, Crow announced on her website that she had adopted a boy who was born the month before. In June 2010, Crow announced that she had adopted another boy born the previous April. She and her sons live in West Nashville, Tennessee. She also owns a home in Destin, Florida. She owned a loft apartment in the NoHo neighborhood of Lower Manhattan from 1998 to 2017.

Crow and her son Levi are diehard Milwaukee Bucks fans, and went to several of their post-season games in 2021 en route to Milwaukee's 2021 NBA Finals victory. Giannis Antetokounmpo and Khris Middleton are her favorite players.

=== Health ===
After being diagnosed with ductal carcinoma in situ (DCIS), a non-invasive form of breast cancer, Crow underwent a lumpectomy at a Los Angeles facility on February 22, 2006, followed by seven weeks of radiation therapy. In August 2010, Crow partnered with her surgeon, Kristi Funk, to open the Sheryl Crow Imaging Center at Funk's Pink Lotus Breast Center. Crow had also suffered from depression.

In November 2011, Crow was diagnosed with a meningioma, the most common kind of brain tumor, usually benign, for which she continued to have regular follow-up exams.

=== Views ===
Crow was raised Presbyterian, but she moved towards a more general affiliation and now describes herself as Christian. She is known for her liberal political point of view, opposing the invasion of Iraq in 2003, supporting gun control measures, opposing military intervention in Syria, and supporting efforts to reduce climate change.

=== Awards ===
Crow has been awarded honorary doctorates from the University of Missouri (her alma mater) and Southeast Missouri State University in Cape Girardeau.

In 2006, Crow was a recipient of the American Academy of Achievement's Golden Plate Award presented by Awards Council member Steven Spielberg at a ceremony in Los Angeles.

On November 3, 2023, Crow was inducted into the Rock and Roll Hall of Fame.

== Discography ==
- Tuesday Night Music Club (1993)
- Sheryl Crow (1996)
- The Globe Sessions (1998)
- C'mon, C'mon (2002)
- Wildflower (2005)
- Detours (2008)
- Home for Christmas (2008)
- 100 Miles from Memphis (2010)
- Feels Like Home (2013)
- Be Myself (2017)
- Threads (2019)
- Evolution (2024)
- Pick You Up (2026)

== Filmography ==
Film
Year	Title	Role	Notes
1998	54	VIP Patron	
1999	The Minus Man	Casper	
2004	De-Lovely	Musical Performer	
2025	Lilith Fair: Building a Mystery	Herself	Documentary

Television
Year	Title	Role	Notes
1990	Cop Rock	Undercover Cop	Episode: "Bang the Potts Slowly"
1996	The Naked Truth	Herself	Episode: "Man Wakes Up with Stranger in Pants!"
1996	Fairway to Heaven	Herself	Television special
1996–2005	Saturday Night Live	Herself/Musical Guest	3 episodes
1997	Ellen	Herself	Episode: "Ellen Unplugged"
2002	Big Brother 3	Herself	Episode 19
2003	Sesame Street	Herself	Episode: "Elmo Helps Gordon with Chess"
2004	One Tree Hill	Herself	Episode: "The First Cut Is the Deepest"
2007	Elmo's Christmas Countdown	Herself	Movie
2009	30 Rock	Herself	Episode: "Kidney Now!"
2010	Hannah Montana	Herself	Episode: "It's the End of the Jake as We Know It"
2010	Cougar Town	Sara	3 episodes
2012	GCB	Herself	Episode: "Forbidden Fruit"
2013	The Voice	Herself	Advisor for Team Blake Shelton
2014	Celebrity Name Game	Herself	6 episodes
2015	Julius Jr.	Sheryl Butterflow	Episode: "Funk in the Junk/Enginepalooza"
2016	Match Game	Herself	2 episodes
2017	NCIS: New Orleans	Herself	Episode : "Krewe"
2022	Barmageddon	Herself/Guest	Episode: "Gwen Stefani & Sheryl Crow"
2026	Dancing with the Stars	Herself/Guest	Season 35; Guest Performer"

== Books ==
- Crow, Sheryl; White, Chuck (2011). If It Makes You Healthy: More than 100 delicious recipes inspired by the seasons (1st ed.). New York: St. Martin's Press. ISBN 978-1429996365.

== See also ==
- If I Were a Carpenter
- List of artists who reached number one on the US Dance chart
- List of awards and nominations received by Sheryl Crow
