= There Goes the Neighborhood (Sheryl Crow song) =

1998 single by Sheryl Crow

Single by Sheryl Crow

from the album The Globe Sessions
- B-side: "Straight to the Moon"; "You Always Get Your Way"
- Released: November 23, 1998
- Studio: Globe (New York City); Sunset Sound Factory (Los Angeles)
- Length: 5:02
- Label: A&M
- Songwriters: Sheryl Crow; Jeff Trott
- Producer: Sheryl Crow

Sheryl Crow singles chronology
"My Favorite Mistake" (1998)	"There Goes the Neighborhood" (1998)	"Anything but Down" (1999)

Music video
- "Sheryl Crow - There Goes The Neighborhood" on YouTube

"There Goes the Neighborhood" is a song by American singer-songwriter Sheryl Crow. The song was released on November 23, 1998, by A&M Records, as the second single from her third studio album, The Globe Sessions (1998). It won an award for Best Female Rock Vocal Performance at the 43rd Annual Grammy Awards in 2001.

Commercially, the song peaked at number two on the US Billboard Triple-A chart and became Crow's eighth top-five single in Canada, reaching number four on the RPM 100 Hit Tracks ranking. In Europe, the song entered the top 40 in Iceland and the United Kingdom. Crow performed the song on her live album Sheryl Crow and Friends: Live from Central Park.

== Grammy history ==
"There Goes the Neighborhood", along with The Globe Sessions and its first single, "My Favorite Mistake", received nominations on the 1999 Grammy Awards. Crow won only Best Rock Album, and the single lost in the field Best Female Rock Vocal Performance to "Uninvited" by Alanis Morissette. With the release of the album Sheryl Crow and Friends: Live from Central Park, Crow won the Best Female Rock Vocal Performance for second year in a row with the track, after taking the prize with her rendition of Guns N' Roses hit "Sweet Child o' Mine" at the 2000 Grammy Awards.

== Track listings ==
- UK CD1
1. "There Goes the Neighborhood" (radio edit 1) – 4:06
2. "You Always Get Your Way" – 2:41
3. "Hard to Make a Stand" (live) – 3:56
- UK CD2; Australian and Japanese CD single
1. "There Goes the Neighborhood" (radio edit 1) – 4:06
2. "Straight to the Moon" – 4:28
3. "My Favorite Mistake" (live) – 4:01
- UK cassette single
1. "There Goes the Neighborhood" (radio edit)
2. "Straight to the Moon"
- French CD single
1. "There Goes the Neighborhood" – 4:06
2. "Run Baby Run" – 4:53

== Credits and personnel ==
Credits are lifted from The Globe Sessions album booklet.

Studios

- Recorded at Globe Studios (New York City) and Sunset Sound Factory (Los Angeles)
- Mixed at Sunset Sound Factory (Los Angeles) and Soundtracks (New York City)
- Mastered at Gateway Mastering (Portland, Maine, US)

Personnel

- Sheryl Crow – writing, clavinet, percussion, production
- Jeff Trott – writing, guitars
- Val McCallum – guitar
- Tim Smith – bass
- Gregg Williams – drums, percussion
- Dan McCarroll – drums
- Bobby Keys – baritone, tenor, and alto saxophone and solo
- Michael Davis – trombone
- Kent Smith – trumpet
- Trina Shoemaker – recording
- Huksy Hoskolds – additional recording
- Andy Wallace – mixing
- Bob Ludwig – mastering

== Charts ==
=== Weekly charts ===
Chart (1998–1999)	Peak position
Australia (ARIA)	141
Canada Top Singles (RPM)	4
Canada Rock/Alternative (RPM)	7
Europe (Eurochart Hot 100)	44
Iceland (Íslenski Listinn Topp 40)	25
Netherlands (Single Top 100)	99
Quebec (ADISQ)	5
Scottish Singles Sales (Official Charts)	17
Sweden (Sverigetopplistan)	56
UK Singles (Official Charts)	19
US Adult Alternative Airplay (Billboard)	2

=== Year-end charts ===
Chart (1999)	Position
Canada Top Singles (RPM)	81
US Triple-A (Billboard)	13

== Release history ==
Region	Date	Format(s)	Label(s)	Ref.
United Kingdom	November 23, 1998	CD; cassette	A&M	
Japan	December 23, 1998	CD	A&M	
