= My Favorite Mistake =

1998 single by Sheryl Crow

Single by Sheryl Crow

from the album The Globe Sessions
- B-side: "There Goes the Neighborhood"
- Released: August 31, 1998
- Studio: Globe (New York City); Sunset Sound Factory (Los Angeles)
- Genre: Rock; country rock
- Length: 4:08
- Label: A&M
- Songwriters: Sheryl Crow; Jeff Trott
- Producer: Sheryl Crow

Sheryl Crow singles chronology
| "Tomorrow Never Dies" (1997) | "My Favorite Mistake" (1998) | "There Goes the Neighborhood" (1999) |

Music video
- "My Favorite Mistake" on YouTube

"My Favorite Mistake" is the first single from Sheryl Crow's third studio album, The Globe Sessions (1998), released on August 31, 1998, through A&M Records. Crow wrote the song about a relationship with a man who proves to be unfaithful. The single peaked at number 20 on the US Billboard Hot 100, becoming Crow's fifth top-20 single in the United States, while reaching number two in Canada and giving Crow her seventh top-five hit there. In the United Kingdom, it reached number nine, becoming her last top-10 single in Britain.

== Writing and recording ==
The song "My Favorite Mistake" was written by Sheryl Crow and her regular collaborator Jeff Trott. The song is about a philandering ex-boyfriend, rumored to be Eric Clapton. Crow, however, has refused to say who the song was about, telling Billboard on the release of her album The Globe Sessions, "Oh, there will be just so much speculation, and because of that there's great safety and protection in the fact that people will be guessing so many different people and I'm the only person who will ever really know. I'm really private about who I've had relationships with, and I don't talk about them in the press. I don't even really talk about them with the people around me." Crow compared "My Favorite Mistake" to "You're So Vain" by Carly Simon. However, she later claimed that she does not look at her relationship with Clapton as a mistake and verified that the song was not about him. As further corroboration, Crow introduced Clapton as "a really good friend of mine" in her 1999 performance in Central Park, later to be released as the live album Sheryl Crow and Friends: Live from Central Park.

The songs on The Globe Sessions including "My Favorite Mistake" were written in the first person as opposed the narrative songs featured on her first two albums. Crow was having so much difficulty with the honesty of the lyrics on the album that she was considering cancelling the release of the record in June 1998 and cancelled an appearance at Lilith Fair in the summer of that year. However, eventually the release of the album was deferred for six weeks while she recorded some new songs with a subsequent delay in the release of the leadoff single.

The song was recorded at Globe Recording Studio in New York owned by Robert FitzSimons and Tracey Loggia. Despite the difficulties in recording the album, Crow told the BBC in 2005 that: "My favorite single is 'My Favorite Mistake'; it was a lot of fun to record and it's still a lot of fun to play."

== Release and promotion ==
"My Favorite Mistake" was released in the US to rock, pop and adult alternative stations in the US on August 18. It was considered to be the obvious choice as the lead single from the album and was widely considered to be one of the best songs from it. A&M Records heavily promoted the single and The Globe Sessions. Samuel Bayer directed the video which was played heavily on both MTV and VH1. Crow was the artist of the month on VH1 for September 1998 with an episode of Storytellers being devoted to her.

The single debuted at number 23 on the Billboard Hot 100 on December 5, 1998, and peaked at number 20, as well as reaching number two on the Billboard Adult Top 40 chart and Canada's RPM Top Singles chart. Crow did not tour immediately on the release of the single or album with a US tour scheduled in February/March 1999. In fact, Crow took time off from promoting the single to tour Vietnam in September 1998 with Steve Earle to promote the International Campaign to Ban Landmines. "My Favorite Mistake" was nominated for the Grammy Award for Best Female Pop Vocal Performance in the 41st Annual Grammy Awards losing to Céline Dion for "My Heart Will Go On". Crow won the Grammy Award for Best Rock Album.

The single was released as a two part set (sold separately) in the United Kingdom. The first part contained two previously unreleased b-sides. The second part contained the songs "Subway Ride" and "Crash & Burn". Though billed as "2 brand new tracks" by a sticker on the front of the release, both songs were actually album tracks from The Globe Sessions. "Subway Ride" is contained on the album as a hidden track. It is also titled on the sticker as "Subway".

Crow performed the song on her live album Sheryl Crow and Friends: Live from Central Park. A different live version appears on some formats of the "There Goes the Neighborhood" single.

== Critical reception ==
Larry Flick of Billboard wrote, "This first single from her imminent third album, The Globe Sessions, isn't a radical departure, but it certainly displays a laudable degree of growth and an apparent desire to be taken seriously. "My Favorite Mistake" is devoid of quirks and gimmicks. It's a simple rock song with smart, heartfelt lyrics. The overall tone of the song feels far more personal this time, and perhaps that's what has inspired such a restrained, almost introverted vocal, as well as an appealing but low-key arrangement. And while that would normally spell commercial death for a record, it will actually serve this one well. Quite frankly, Crow is just too intriguing here to toss this single off after one listen. She inspires you to go back and listen again and again—and the reward is finding something new and interesting about the track each time." In 2017, Billboard ranked the song number six on their list of the 10 greatest Sheryl Crow songs, and in 2023, The Guardian ranked the song number one on their list of the 20 greatest Sheryl Crow songs.

== Music video ==
The music video for the song features Crow in a room with spotlights, playing bass guitar and making all kinds of movements, wearing two identical outfits composed of a sleeveless top and leather pants, and each of a different colour, black and red. It was directed by Samuel Bayer.

== Track listings ==
US 7-inch single

A. "My Favorite Mistake" (LP version) – 4:06
B. "There Goes the Neighborhood" (LP version) – 5:02

Canadian, UK, European, and Australian CD single

1. "My Favorite Mistake" – 4:06
2. "Subway Ride" – 4:05
3. "Crash and Burn" – 6:37

UK cassette single

1. "My Favorite Mistake" – 4:06
2. "In Need" – 5:35
3. "Carolina" – 3:55

Japanese CD single

1. "My Favorite Mistake"
2. "In Need"
3. "Carolina"
4. "Subway Ride"

== Credits and personnel ==
Credits are lifted from The Globe Sessions album booklet.

Studios

- Recorded at Globe Studios (New York City) and Sunset Sound Factory (Los Angeles)
- Mixed at Sunset Sound Factory (Los Angeles) and Soundtracks (New York City)
- Mastered at Gateway Mastering (Portland, Maine, US)

Personnel

- Sheryl Crow – writing, bass, Hammond B-3, Wurlitzer, percussion, production
- Jeff Trott – writing, tremolo guitar
- Wendy Melvoin – guitars
- Gregg Williams – drums
- Trina Shoemaker – recording
- Huksy Hoskolds – additional recording
- Tchad Blake – mixing
- Bob Ludwig – mastering

== Charts ==
=== Weekly charts ===
| Chart (1998–1999) | Peak position |
|---|---|
| Australia (ARIA) | 87 |
| Canada (Nielsen SoundScan) | 6 |
| Canada Top Singles (RPM) | 2 |
| Canada Adult Contemporary (RPM) | 7 |
| Europe (Eurochart Hot 100) | 19 |
| Finland (Suomen virallinen singlelista) | 14 |
| France (SNEP) | 70 |
| Germany (GfK) | 79 |
| Iceland (Íslenski Listinn Topp 40) | 35 |
| Netherlands (Dutch Top 40 Tipparade) | 22 |
| Netherlands (Single Top 100) | 79 |
| New Zealand (Recorded Music NZ) | 16 |
| Quebec (ADISQ) | 3 |
| Scottish Singles Sales (Official Charts) | 6 |
| Sweden (Sverigetopplistan) | 52 |
| Switzerland (Schweizer Hitparade) | 29 |
| UK Singles (Official Charts) | 9 |
| US Billboard Hot 100 | 20 |
| US Adult Alternative Airplay (Billboard) | 1 |
| US Adult Pop Airplay (Billboard) | 2 |
| US Alternative Airplay (Billboard) | 26 |
| US Pop Airplay (Billboard) | 5 |

=== Year-end charts ===
| Chart (1998) | Position |
|---|---|
| Canada Top Singles (RPM) | 65 |
| Canada Adult Contemporary (RPM) | 52 |
| UK Singles (OCC) | 198 |
| US Adult Top 40 (Billboard) | 31 |
| US Mainstream Top 40 (Billboard) | 50 |
| US Triple-A (Billboard) | 18 |

| Chart (1999) | Position |
|---|---|
| Canada Top Singles (RPM) | 95 |
| US Adult Top 40 (Billboard) | 17 |
| US Mainstream Top 40 (Billboard) | 56 |
| US Triple-A (Billboard) | 21 |

== Certifications ==
| Region | Certification | Certified units/sales |
|---|---|---|
| United States (RIAA) | Gold | 500,000^{‡} |
^{‡} Sales+streaming figures based on certification alone.

== Release history ==
| Region | Date | Format(s) | Label(s) | Ref(s). |
|---|---|---|---|---|
| United States | August 25, 1998 | Contemporary hit; triple A; rock radio | A&M | |
| United Kingdom | August 31, 1998 | CD; cassette | A&M | |
| Canada | September 8, 1998 | CD | A&M | |
| Japan | September 18, 1998 | CD | A&M | |

== Notes ==
1. Eye.net review of The Globe Sessions recovered 2 November 2005
2. Entertainment Weekly, September 25, 1998, p42 recovered on November 2, 2005
3. Billboard Magazine, "The Globe's the Limit on new Sheryl Crow album" August 29, 1998, V110 n35 page 3 recovered through Galenet
4. (3) Entertainment Weekly Op. Cit. p42
5. (4) Transcript of BBC Radio interview with Ken Bruce accessed 2 November 2005
