= Trina Shoemaker =

American record producer

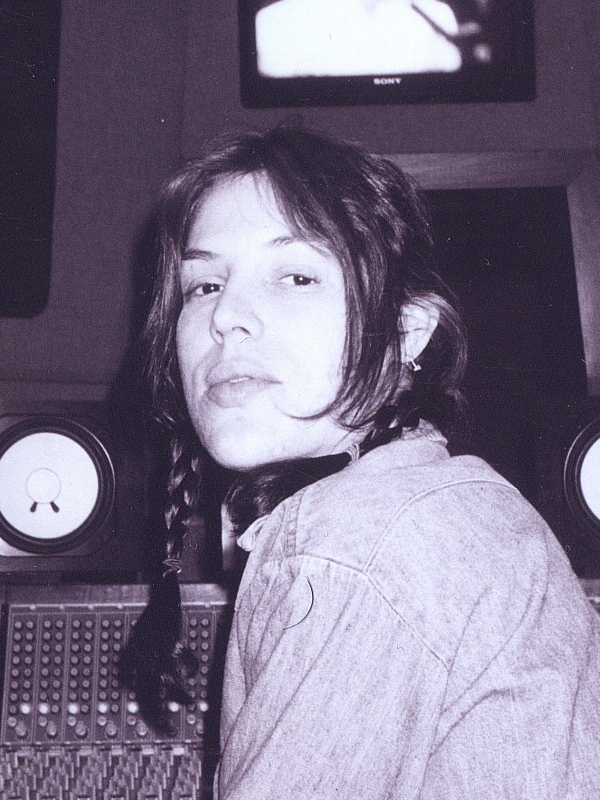
- Born: Kathryn Shoemaker; June 14, 1965 (age 60); Joliet, Illinois, U.S.
- Occupations: Record producer, mixer, sound engineer
- Years active: 1991–present
- Spouse: Grayson Capps (married 2003–present)

Kathryn "Trina" Shoemaker is an American record producer, sound engineer and mixer best known for her work with Queens of the Stone Age, Sheryl Crow, Emmylou Harris, The Wood Brothers, Charley Crockett, The Mountain Goats, Tanya Tucker, Turnpike Troubadours, The Wild Feathers, Grayson Capps, The Indigo Girls, Brandi Carlile, Rodney Crowell, American Aquarium and Shooter Jennings. Shoemaker has won four Grammy Awards and was the first woman to win a Grammy for engineering.

== Early life ==
Shoemaker was born in Joliet, Illinois, and attended Joliet Central High School.

== Awards and honours ==
=== Grammy Awards ===
- 2020 Best Country Album: Tanya Tucker, While I'm Living
- 2004 Best Pop/Contemporary Gospel Album: Steven Curtis Chapman, All Things New
- 1998 Best Engineered Album (Non-Classical): Sheryl Crow, The Globe Sessions
- 1998 Best Rock Album Engineer: Sheryl Crow, The Globe Sessions

=== Americana Music Association ===
- 2021 Lifetime Achievement Award
