= The Globe Sessions =

Studio album by Sheryl Crow
- Released: September 21, 1998
- Recorded: 1996–1998
- Studios: Globe Studios (New York), Sunset Sound Factory (Los Angeles)
- Genres: Rock; folk rock; country rock
- Length: 55:06
- Label: A&M
- Producer: Sheryl Crow

Sheryl Crow chronology
| Sheryl Crow (1996) | The Globe Sessions (1998) | Sheryl Crow and Friends: Live from Central Park (1999) |

Singles from The Globe Sessions
- 1. "My Favorite Mistake" Released: August 31, 1998; 2. "There Goes the Neighborhood" Released: November 23, 1998; 3. "Anything but Down" Released: February 22, 1999

Professional ratings
Review scores
| Source | Rating |
|---|---|
| AllMusic | 4/5 stars |
| The Boston Phoenix | 3/4 stars |
| Christgau's Consumer Guide | (1-star Honorable Mention) |
| Entertainment Weekly | A− |
| The Independent | 3/5 stars |
| Los Angeles Times | 4/4 stars |
| NME | 6/10 |
| Rolling Stone | 4/5 stars |
| The Rolling Stone Album Guide | 2.5/5 stars |
| Spin | 5/10 |

The Globe Sessions is the third studio album by American singer-songwriter Sheryl Crow, released on September 21, 1998 in the United Kingdom and September 29, 1998 in the United States, then re-released in 1999. It was nominated for Album of the Year, Best Rock Album and Best Engineered Non-Classical Album at the 1999 Grammys, winning the last two awards. The Globe Sessions reached No. 2 on the UK Albums Chart and peaked at No. 5 on the Billboard 200 chart, with US sales reaching two million copies as of January 2008. The album was recorded at and named for the sessions recorded at Globe Studios, a multi-room production facility in New York owned by Robert FitzSimons and Tracey Loggia.

In 2019, it was announced that the 2008 fire that swept through Universal Studios Hollywood ultimately destroyed buildings belonging to Universal Music Group. It was initially reported that The Globe Sessions was one of hundreds of albums to have had their studio masters completely destroyed. However, in a 2022 interview with The Line of Best Fit, this was revealed to be false, with Crow stating that "luckily, they found most of mine in a different area."

== Track listing ==
All tracks are written by Sheryl Crow, except where noted.

| No. | Title | Writer(s) | Length |
|---|---|---|---|
| 1. | "My Favorite Mistake" | Crow, Jeff Trott | 4:08 |
| 2. | "There Goes the Neighborhood" | Crow, Trott | 5:02 |
| 3. | "Riverwide" | | 4:07 |
| 4. | "It Don't Hurt" | Crow, Trott | 4:49 |
| 5. | "Maybe That's Something" | Crow, Trott | 4:17 |
| 6. | "Am I Getting Through (Part I & II)" | | 5:31 |
| 7. | "Anything but Down" | | 4:17 |
| 8. | "The Difficult Kind" | | 6:19 |
| 9. | "Mississippi" | Bob Dylan | 4:41 |
| 10. | "Members Only" | | 4:57 |
| 11. | "Crash and Burn (Note: On US and Canadian editions, "Crash and Burn" ends at 6:36, and the hidden track "Subway Ride" begins at 7:11, bringing the total length to 11:19.)" | | 6:36 |

Japanese bonus tracks
| No. | Title | Writer(s) | Length |
|---|---|---|---|
| 12. | "Resuscitation" | Crow, Trott | 3:59 |
| 13. | "Carolina" | | 3:56 |

1999 Re-Release
| No. | Title | Writer(s) | Length |
|---|---|---|---|
| 12. | "Sweet Child o' Mine" | Steven Adler, Saul Hudson, Duff McKagan, Axl Rose, Izzy Stradlin | 3:55 |

== Personnel ==
- Sheryl Crow – vocals, acoustic and electric guitar, acoustic and electric 12 string guitar, National steel guitar, bass guitar, keyboards, Hammond B-3 organ, Wurlitzer electric piano, clavinet, harmonica, percussion
- Jeff Trott – acoustic and electric guitar (2, 3, 5–7, 10), tremolo guitar (1), 12 string guitar (4, 9), bass guitar (5), slide guitar (8), Moog synthesizer (10)
- Gregg Williams – drums (1, 2, 4–6, 10, 11), percussion (2, 5, 6, 10), tambourine (3), programming
- Benmont Tench – organ (3, 8), piano (7–9), chamberlin (9)
- Mitchell Froom – clavinet and Orchestron (6)
- Lisa Germano – violin (solo on 3, 4), autoharp (4)
- Val McCallum – electric guitar (2, 10, 11)
- Wendy Melvoin – guitar (1), bass guitar (4)
- Todd Wolfe – electric guitar solo (4)
- Greg Leisz – pedal steel guitar (7)
- Tim Smith – bass (2)
- Dan Rothchild – double bass (3), bass guitar (7–9)
- Dan McCarroll – drums (2, 7–9)
- Jim Bogios – drums (4)
- Trina Shoemaker – drum loop (3)
- Bobby Keys – alto, tenor and baritone saxophone (2)
- Kent Smith – trumpet (2)
- Michael Davis – trombone (2)
- Avril Brown, Mark Feldman, Maura Giannini (−6), Matthew Pierce, Lorenza Ponce, Mary Rowell, Laura Seaton – violin (3, 6)
- Michelle Kinney, Mary Wooten, Garo Yellin – cello (6)
- Jimmie Haskell – string arrangement and conductor (6)
- Kathy Crow – vocals (8)
- David Russo: - programming

=== Production ===
- Producers: Sheryl Crow, ("Sweet Child o´Mine" produced by Rick Rubin)
- Executive Producer: Rory Kaplan
- Engineers: Trina Shoemaker, S. Husky Höskulds
- Assistant engineers: Brant Scott, Howard Willing, Ryan Baesch
- Mixing: Tchad Blake, Andy Wallace (tracks 2, 7–9)
- Assistant mixing engineers Steve Sisco, Howard Willing
- Mastering: Bob Ludwig
- Digital engineer: Jeff Levison
- Surround mix and digital mastering: David Tickle
- Production coordination: Brant Scott
- Art direction and design: Jeri Heiden
- Cover photography: Peter Lindbergh
- Photographies inside: Tchad Blake

== Accolades ==
=== Grammy Awards ===
| Year | Nominee / work | Award | Result |
|---|---|---|---|
| 1999 | The Globe Sessions | Album of the Year | Nominated |
| 1999 | The Globe Sessions | Best Rock Album | Won |
| 1999 | "My Favorite Mistake" | Best Female Pop Vocal Performance | Nominated |
| 1999 | "There Goes the Neighborhood" | Best Female Rock Vocal Performance | Nominated |
| 1999 | Sheryl Crow | Producer of the Year, Non-Classical | Nominated |
| 1999 | Andy Wallace, Tchad Blake & Trina Shoemaker (engineers) | Best Engineered Album, Non Classical | Won |

== Charts and certifications ==
=== Weekly charts ===
Weekly chart performance for The Globe Sessions
| Chart (1998) | Position |
|---|---|
| Australian Albums (ARIA) | 52 |
| Austrian Albums (Ö3 Austria) | 19 |
| Belgian Albums (Ultratop Flanders) | 10 |
| Belgian Albums (Ultratop Wallonia) | 27 |
| Canadian Albums (Billboard) | 3 |
| Dutch Albums (Album Top 100) | 28 |
| Finnish Albums Chart | 27 |
| French Albums (SNEP) | 18 |
| German Albums (Offizielle Top 100) | 4 |
| Japanese Albums (Oricon) | 18 |
| New Zealand Albums (RMNZ) | 16 |
| Norwegian Albums (VG-lista) | 10 |
| Scottish Albums (Official Charts) | 3 |
| Swedish Albums (Sverigetopplistan) | 9 |
| Swiss Albums (Schweizer Hitparade) | 5 |
| UK Albums (OCC) | 2 |
| US Billboard 200 | 5 |
| European Albums (Eurotipsheet) | 2 |

=== Year-end charts ===
1998 Year-end chart performance for The Globe Sessions
| Chart (1998) | Position |
|---|---|
| Canadian RPM Albums Chart | 97 |
| German Albums (Offizielle Top 100) | 90 |
| UK Albums (OCC) | 63 |
| US Billboard 200 | 143 |

1999 Year-end chart performance for The Globe Sessions
| Chart (1999) | Position |
|---|---|
| US Billboard 200 | 76 |

=== Certifications ===
Certifications for The Globe Sessions
| Region | Certification | Certified units/sales |
|---|---|---|
| Australia (ARIA) | Gold | 7,500^{^} |
| Canada (Music Canada) | Platinum | 100,000^{^} |
| Japan (RIAJ) | Gold | 100,000^{^} |
| New Zealand (RMNZ) | Gold | 7,500^{^} |
| Switzerland (IFPI Switzerland) | Gold | 25,000^{^} |
| United Kingdom (BPI) | Platinum | 300,000^{^} |
| United States (RIAA) | Platinum | 1,000,000^{^} |
^{^} Shipments figures based on certification alone.

== Release history ==
Release history for The Globe Sessions
| Region | Date |
|---|---|
| United Kingdom | September 21, 1998 |
| United States | September 29, 1998 |
