= Sheryl Crow and Friends: Live from Central Park =

Live album by Sheryl Crow
- Released: December 7, 1999
- Recorded: September 14, 1999
- Venue: East Meadow, Central Park, New York City
- Genre: Rock; folk; country; blues
- Length: 73:00
- Label: A&M
- Producer: Sheryl Crow

Sheryl Crow chronology
The Globe Sessions (1998)	Sheryl Crow and Friends: Live from Central Park (1999)	C'mon, C'mon (2002)

Professional ratings
Review scores
Source	Rating
AllMusic	1.5/5 stars
Entertainment Weekly	B−
The New Rolling Stone Album Guide	2/5 stars
Robert Christgau	A−

Sheryl Crow and Friends: Live from Central Park is a live album by American singer-songwriter Sheryl Crow, released on December 7, 1999, by A&M Records. Although it was not commercially successful upon its release, merely reaching No. 107 on the Billboard 200, the album has managed to reach US sales of 486,000 units as of January 2008, earning it gold certification consideration. The concert was held in New York's Central Park on September 14, 1999, and featured some of Crow's many musical friends; the Dixie Chicks (now simply the Chicks), Fleetwood Mac's Stevie Nicks, Pretenders leader Chrissie Hynde, the Rolling Stones' Keith Richards, Sarah McLachlan and legendary guitar virtuoso Eric Clapton. The concert's emcee was actor and comedian Bill Murray, another friend of Crow.

== Track listing ==
No.	Title	Writer(s)	Length
1.	"Everyday Is a Winding Road"	Crow, Brian MacLeod, Jeff Trott	5:29
2.	"My Favorite Mistake"	Crow, Trott	4:13
3.	"Leaving Las Vegas"	David Baerwald, Bill Bottrell, Crow, Kevin Gilbert, David Ricketts	7:21
4.	"Strong Enough" (featuring Dixie Chicks)	Baerwald, Bottrell, Crow, Gilbert, MacLeod, Ricketts	3:36
5.	"It Don't Hurt"	Crow, Trott	5:56
6.	"A Change Would Do You Good"	Crow, MacLeod, Trott	5:17
7.	"Gold Dust Woman" (featuring Stevie Nicks)	Stevie Nicks	4:25
8.	"If It Makes You Happy" (featuring Chrissie Hynde)	Crow, Trott	5:03
9.	"All I Wanna Do"	Baerwald, Bottrell, Wyn Cooper, Crow, Gilbert	5:59
10.	"Happy" (featuring Keith Richards)	Mick Jagger, Keith Richards	3:21
11.	"The Difficult Kind" (featuring Sarah McLachlan)	Crow	5:55
12.	"White Room" (featuring Eric Clapton)	Pete Brown, Jack Bruce	5:50
13.	"There Goes the Neighborhood"	Crow, Trott	5:32
14.	"Tombstone Blues"	Bob Dylan	5:03

- "Gold Dust Woman" was originally performed by Fleetwood Mac.
- "Happy" was originally performed by The Rolling Stones.
- "White Room" was originally performed by Cream.
- "Tombstone Blues" was originally performed by Bob Dylan.

== Personnel ==
Sources:

- Sheryl Crow – acoustic guitar, bass guitar, harmonica, electric guitar, vocals, record producer
- Jim Bogios – drums
- Matthew Brubeck – bass guitar, cello
- Mike Rowe – keyboards
- Mary Rowell – acoustic guitar, violin
- Tim Smith – bass guitar, electric guitar, background vocals
- Peter Stroud – acoustic guitar, electric guitar, slide guitar
- Eric Clapton – "White Room"
- Dixie Chicks – "Strong Enough"
- Chrissie Hynde – "If It Makes You Happy"
- Sarah McLachlan – "The Difficult Kind"
- Stevie Nicks – "Gold Dust Woman"
- Keith Richards – "Happy"

== Charts and certifications ==
=== Weekly charts ===
Weekly chart performance for Sheryl Crow and Friends: Live from Central Park
Chart (1999–2000)	Peak position
Australian Albums (ARIA)	167
German Albums (Offizielle Top 100)	76
Swiss Albums (Schweizer Hitparade)	46
US Billboard 200	107

=== Certifications ===
Certifications for Sheryl Crow and Friends: Live from Central Park
Region	Certification	Certified units/sales
Canada (Music Canada)	Gold	50,000^{^}
^{^} Shipments figures based on certification alone.
