= Sheryl Crow discography =

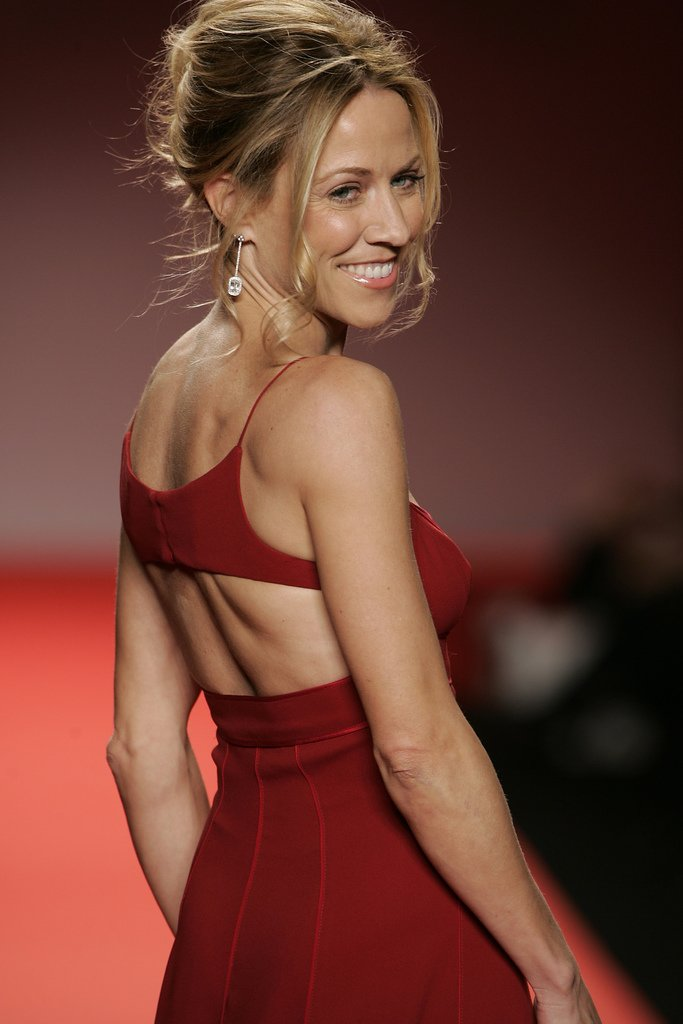
- Studio albums: 13
- Extended plays: 2
- Live albums: 4
- Compilation albums: 7
- Singles: 56
- B-sides: 21
- Video albums: 13
- Music videos: 61
- Box sets: 1

The discography of Sheryl Crow, an American singer-songwriter, consists of 13 studio albums, four live albums, two EPs, seven compilation albums, one box set, 56 singles, six promotional singles, 13 video albums, 61 music videos, 21 B-sides and 19 soundtrack contributions. She has sold over 50 million albums worldwide. According to the Recording Industry Association of America (RIAA), she has sold 16 million certified albums in the United States. Billboard named her the 5th Greatest Alternative Artist of all time.

After signing a contract with A&M Records and not wanting to release her own first attempt at a debut record thinking it was unmemorable, Crow finally released Tuesday Night Music Club in 1993. It remains her most successful effort to date and one of the best-selling albums of the 1990s, having sold more than ten million copies internationally by the end of the decade. Such hits as "All I Wanna Do", "Strong Enough", and "Can't Cry Anymore" garnered Crow's popularity on radio, while Tuesday Night Music Club became a Billboard 200 mainstay, rising from the debut spot at number 173 to its peak in the top five and spending exactly 100 weeks on the chart. The album also saw success in countries such as Australia and Canada and throughout Europe. In 1995, Crow won three Grammy Awards (out of five nominations), including for Best New Artist.

Her second album, Sheryl Crow, was released in 1996 and debuted at No. 6 on the Billboard 200, becoming Crow's second consecutive top ten album, spending over a year on the chart and ranking as one of the most sold albums of 1996 and 1997. In less than a year, the album was certified as triple platinum. The album produced five singles: "If It Makes You Happy", "Everyday Is a Winding Road", "Hard to Make a Stand", "A Change Would Do You Good", and "Home", with the first two peaking at Nos. 10 and 11 on the Billboard Hot 100, respectively. The self-titled record remains Crow's most critically acclaimed album to date. Crow won two Grammy Awards for this new effort in 1997 and one additional nomination in 1998. Shortly afterwards, Crow contributed to the Tomorrow Never Dies soundtrack, writing and performing the theme song for the James Bond movie. The song became Crow's fifth top-20 hit in the UK and received nominations for a Golden Globe and a Grammy.

Despite encountering difficulties in recording her third studio album, Crow released The Globe Sessions in 1998. Preceded by the top 20 hit single "My Favorite Mistake", the album debuted at No. 5 on the Billboard 200 and went on to sell more than two million copies in the United States. The Globe Sessions received five Grammy Award nominations, including for Album of the Year, but won only for Best Rock Album. The next year, Crow's rendition of the song "Sweet Child O'Mine" was included in the Big Daddy soundtrack and won a Grammy Award for Best Female Rock Vocal Performance. In addition, Crow released her first live album, recorded at Central Park in the company of guest musicians such as Keith Richards, Stevie Nicks, and Eric Clapton. The album was not as commercially successful as its predecessors, being certified as gold only in Canada but at the same time, garnered Crow three fresh Grammy nominations, winning Best Female Rock Vocal Performance for "There Goes the Neighborhood" in 2000.

C'mon, C'mon (2002), her following release, debuted at number two in the US, Canada and United Kingdom. The album became her highest debut in several countries and produced the hit single "Soak Up the Sun". The album helped Crow win an American Music Award and four Grammy Award nominations. Once again, Crow won Best Female Rock Vocal Performance, this time for the second single "Steve McQueen". In 2003, Crow released The Very Best of Sheryl Crow, her first greatest hits compilation. Propelled by the major hit single "The First Cut Is the Deepest", the album went on to sell over four million copies in the United States alone, staying inside the Billboard 200 for 80 weeks and becoming 2004's ninth best-selling album. Crow won two American Music Awards the next year in the categories Favorite Rock/Pop Female Artist and Favorite Adult Contemporary Artist.

Her fifth studio album, Wildflower (2005) debuted at No. 2 on the Billboard 200 and No. 1 on the Canadian Albums chart. The album was certified as platinum in less than a year and spawned the single "Always on Your Side", which became Crow's ninth Billboard Hot 100 top 40 hit. Wildflower received three Grammy nominations. In 2008, Crow released Detours, her first album in three years. Like its last two predecessors, the album debuted at No. 2 on the Billboard 200, remaining on the chart for over 20 weeks and becoming one of the year's best-sold albums. Her seventh studio album, 100 Miles from Memphis, was released in 2010 and became her last album on A&M Records.

After signing with Warner Music Nashville, Crow announced the release of her debut album in the country music format. Her ninth studio album, entitled Feels Like Home, was released September 10, 2013. The lead-off single, "Easy", saw release exclusively to country radio and became Crow's first top 20 country airplay hit.

== Albums ==
=== Studio albums ===
Title	Details	Peak chart positions											Sales	Certifications
Title	Details	US	US Country	AUS	CAN	GER	JPN	NED	NOR	SWE	SWI	UK	Sales	Certifications
Tuesday Night Music Club	Released: August 3, 1993; Label: A&M; Formats: CD, cassette	3	—	1	5	9	54	17	24	41	6	8	US: 4,500,000; EU: 1,000,000	RIAA: 7× Platinum; ARIA: 5× Platinum; BPI: 2× Platinum; MC: 3× Platinum
Sheryl Crow	Released: September 24, 1996; Label: A&M; Formats: CD, cassette	6	—	14	12	17	24	23	20	8	3	5	US: 2,446,000; EU: 1,000,000	RIAA: 3× Platinum; ARIA: 2× Platinum; BPI: 3× Platinum; IFPI SWI: Gold; MC: 3× Platinum; RIAJ: Platinum
The Globe Sessions	Released: September 29, 1998; Label: A&M; Formats: CD, cassette, SACD	5	—	52	3	4	18	28	10	9	5	2	US: 2,000,000	RIAA: Platinum; BPI: Platinum; IFPI SWI: Gold; MC: 2× Platinum; RIAJ: Gold
C'mon, C'mon	Released: April 16, 2002; Label: A&M; Formats: CD, cassette	2	—	40	2	7	9	50	11	12	4	2	US: 2,102,000	RIAA: Platinum; BPI: Gold; IFPI SWI: Gold; MC: Platinum; RIAJ: Platinum
Wildflower	Released: September 27, 2005; Label: A&M; Formats: CD, digital download	2	—	98	1	21	20	54	—	48	17	25	US: 949,000	RIAA: Platinum; MC: Platinum
Detours	Released: February 5, 2008; Label: A&M; Formats: CD, digital download	2	—	111	2	18	22	36	—	27	14	20	US: 405,000	MC: Gold
Home for Christmas	Released: November 26, 2008; Label: A&M; Formats: CD, digital download	164	—	—	—	—	—	—	—	—	—	—	US: 40,000	
100 Miles from Memphis	Released: July 20, 2010; Label: A&M; Formats: CD, digital download	3	—	95	2	46	34	44	19	—	17	34	US: 219,000	
Feels Like Home	Released: September 10, 2013; Label: Warner Bros.; Formats: CD, digital download	7	3	134	16	—	63	92	—	—	60	16	US: 65,000	
Be Myself	Released: April 21, 2017; Label: Warner Bros.; Formats: CD, digital download, vinyl	22	—	97	59	97	67	124	—	—	43	47	US: 20,000	
Threads	Released: August 30, 2019; Label: Big Machine; Formats: CD, digital download, vinyl	30	2	73	31	25	—	67	—	—	9	10	US: 49,200	
Evolution	Released: March 29, 2024; Label: Big Machine; Formats: CD, digital download, vinyl	— (Note: "Evolution" did not enter the US Billboard 200, but peaked at number 24 on the Billboard Top Album Sales chart.)	—	— (Note: Evolution did not enter the ARIA top 100, but peaked at number 5 on the Digital Albums chart and number 55 on the Physical Albums chart)	—	67	123	—	—	—	9	90		
Pick You Up	Released: October 9, 2026; Label: Old Green Barn Productions Inc, Thirty Tigers; Formats: CD, digital download, vinyl	—	—	—	—	—	—	—	—	—	—	—		
"—" denotes releases that did not chart or were not released to that country.

=== Compilation albums ===
Title	Details	Peak chart positions										Sales	Certifications
Title	Details	US	AUS	CAN	GER	IRE	JPN	NOR	NZ	SWE	UK	Sales	Certifications
The Very Best of Sheryl Crow	Released: October 13, 2003; Label: A&M; Formats: CD, digital download	2	89	2	27	3	11	9	6	26	2	US: 4,010,000; EU: 1,000,000	RIAA: 3× Platinum; ARIA: Gold; BPI: 2× Platinum; IFPI SWI: Gold; MC: 5× Platinum; RIANZ: Platinum; RIAJ: Gold
iTunes Originals	Released: January 10, 2006; Label: A&M; Formats: Digital download	—	—	—	—	—	—	—	—	—	—		
Hits and Rarities	Released: November 12, 2007; Label: A&M; Formats: CD, digital download	—	—	—	—	—	168	—	—	—	122		BPI: Silver; RMNZ: Gold
Icon 1 / Icon 2	Released: January 4, 2011; Label: A&M; Formats: CD, digital download	—	—	—	—	—	—	—	—	—	—		
Everyday Is a Winding Road: The Collection	Released: February 15, 2013; Label: Spectrum Music; Formats: CD, digital download	—	—	—	—	59	—	—	—	—	—		
5 Classic Albums	Released: November 11, 2013; Label: A&M; Formats: 5×CD box set, digital download	—	—	—	—	—	—	—	—	—	—		
Sheryl: Music from the Feature Documentary	Released: May 5, 2022; Label: A&M; Formats: CD, digital download	—	—	—	—	—	—	—	—	—	—		
"—" denotes releases that did not chart or were not released to that country.

=== Live albums ===
Title	Details	Peak chart positions						Sales	Certifications
Title	Details	US	AUS	GER	JPN	SWI	UK	Sales	Certifications
Live from Central Park	Released: December 7, 1999; Label: A&M; Formats: CD, cassette	107	167	76	—	46	143	US: 486,000	CAN: Gold
Live at Budokan	Released: July 25, 2003; Label: Universal; Formats: CD	—	—	—	90	—	—		
Live at the Capitol Theatre – 2017 Be Myself Tour	Released: November 9, 2018; Label: Cleopatra Entertainment; Formats: 2×CD/DVD, 2×CD/Bluray, LP, download	—	—	—	—	—	—		
Live from the Ryman and More	Released: August 13, 2021; Label: BMLG; Formats: 2×CD, 4×LP, streaming, download	—	—	43	—	16	—		
"—" denotes releases that did not chart or were not released to that country.

== EPs ==
Title	Details
AOL Session Live (Sessions@AOL)	Released: 2004; Label: A&M; Formats: Download; Tracks: 3
The Story of Everything	Released: November 2023; Label: Big Machine Group; Formats:LP; Tracks: 8

== Singles ==
=== 1990s ===
Year	Single	Peak chart positions										Certifications	Album
Year	Single	US	US Alt	US Main	AUS	CAN	GER	ICE	JPN	NED	UK	Certifications	Album
1993	"Run, Baby, Run"	—	—	—	156	86	—	—	—	—	83		Tuesday Night Music Club
1994	"What I Can Do for You"	—	—	—	—	—	—	—	—	—	84		Tuesday Night Music Club
1994	"Leaving Las Vegas"	60	8	31	121	29	—	—	—	—	66		Tuesday Night Music Club
1994	"All I Wanna Do"	2	4	1	1	1	10	4	5	10	4	RIAA: Gold; ARIA: 3× Platinum; BPI: Gold; RMNZ: Platinum	Tuesday Night Music Club
1994	"Strong Enough"	5	10	3	3	1	69	9	31	—	33	RIAA: Gold; ARIA: 2× Platinum; RMNZ: Gold	Tuesday Night Music Club
1995	"Can't Cry Anymore"	36	38	10	41	3	—	—	50	—	33		Tuesday Night Music Club
1995	"Run, Baby, Run" (re-issue)	—	—	—	—	—	—	—	—	45	24		Tuesday Night Music Club
1995	"What I Can Do for You" (re-issue)	—	—	—	—	—	—	—	—	—	43		Tuesday Night Music Club
1995	"D'yer Mak'er"	—	—	35	—	—	—	12	31	—	—		A Tribute to Led Zeppelin
1996	"If It Makes You Happy"	10	6	4	20	1	80	17	2	—	9	RIAA: Platinum; ARIA: Platinum; BPI: Silver; RMNZ: Platinum	Sheryl Crow
1996	"Everyday Is a Winding Road"	11	17	5	67	1	—	14	20	79	12	ARIA: Gold	Sheryl Crow
1997	"Hard to Make a Stand"	—	—	—	—	15	—	—	8	—	22		Sheryl Crow
1997	"A Change Would Do You Good"	— (Note: "A Change Would Do You Good" was not eligible to enter the Hot 100 but reached number 19 on the Billboard Hot 100 Airplay chart.)	25	16	74	2	—	14	—	—	8		Sheryl Crow
1997	"Home"	—	—	—	—	40	—	—	—	—	25		Sheryl Crow
1997	"Tomorrow Never Dies"	—	—	—	65	—	52	6	28	43	12		Tomorrow Never Dies: Music from the Motion Picture
1998	"My Favorite Mistake"	20	26	5	87	2	79	35	1	79	9	RIAA: Gold	The Globe Sessions
1998	"There Goes the Neighborhood"	—	—	—	141	4	—	25	37	99	19		The Globe Sessions
1999	"Anything but Down"	49	—	17	—	11	—	—	—	—	19		The Globe Sessions
1999	"Sweet Child o' Mine"	—	29	—	60	42	—	11	6	95	30		Big Daddy: Music from the Motion Picture
"—" denotes releases that did not chart or were not released to that country

=== 2000s ===
Year	Single	Peak chart positions										Certifications	Album
Year	Single	US	US Adult	US AC	AUS	CAN	GER	JPN	NED	SWI	UK	Certifications	Album
2002	"Soak Up the Sun"	17	1	5	88	24	96	1	76	15	16	RIAA: Gold; ARIA: Gold; RMNZ: Gold	C'mon, C'mon
2002	"Steve McQueen"	88	13	—	—	—	—	46	86	77	44		C'mon, C'mon
2002	"C'mon, C'mon" (with The Corrs)	—	36	—	—	—	—	—	—	—	—		C'mon, C'mon
2003	"The First Cut Is the Deepest"	14	1	1	50	—	61	8	79	45	37	ARIA: Gold; RIAA: Gold	The Very Best of Sheryl Crow
2003	"Light in Your Eyes"	— (Note: "Light in Your Eyes" did not enter the Billboard Hot 100, but peaked at number 21 on the Bubbling Under Hot 100 chart.)	10	36	—	—	—	—	—	—	73		The Very Best of Sheryl Crow
2003	"It's So Easy" (with Wolfgang Niedecken)	—	—	—	—	—	92	—	—	—	—		C'mon, C'mon
2005	"Good Is Good"	64	5	16	—	—	89	7	98	55	75		Wildflower
2006	"Always on Your Side" (with Sting)	33	11	12	—	2	—	—	—	—	—		Wildflower
2006	"Real Gone"	— (Note: "Real Gone" did not enter the Billboard Hot 100, but peaked at number one on the Bubbling Under Hot 100 chart.)	—	—	—	—	—	100	—	—	—	RIAA: Gold; ARIA: Gold; BPI: Silver; RMNZ: Gold	Cars: Original Soundtrack
2007	"Not Fade Away"	78	—	—	—	—	—	—	—	—	—		—N/a
2007	"Shine Over Babylon"	—	—	—	—	—	—	—	—	—	—		Detours
2008	"Love Is Free"	77	17	—	—	46	49	10	—	51	76		Detours
2008	"Now That You're Gone"	—	—	—	—	—	—	—	—	—	—		Detours
2008	"So Glad We Made It"	—	—	—	—	—	—	—	—	—	—		—N/a
2009	"Out of Our Heads"	—	—	—	—	—	—	—	—	—	—		Detours
2009	"The Christmas Song"	—	—	24	—	—	—	—	—	—	—		Home for Christmas
"—" denotes releases that did not chart or were not released to that country

=== 2010s–2020s ===
Year	Single	Peak chart positions									Album
Year	Single	US	US AAA	US Country	AUT	CAN	CAN Country	JPN	SWE	UK	Album
2010	"Lean on Me" (with Kid Rock & Keith Urban)	47	—	—	45	11	—	—	32	—	Hope for Haiti Now
2010	"Love Will Remain"	—	—	—	—	—	—	—	—	—	—N/a
2010	"Summer Day"	—	3	—	—	—	—	7	—	149	100 Miles from Memphis
2010	"Sign Your Name" (with Justin Timberlake)	—	18	—	—	—	—	—	—	—	100 Miles from Memphis
2012	"Woman in the White House"	—	—	—	—	—	—	—	—	—	—N/a
2013	"Easy"	72	—	17	—	—	49	45	—	80	Feels Like Home
2013	"Callin' Me When I'm Lonely"	—	—	26	—	—	—	—	—	—	Feels Like Home
2014	"Shotgun"	—	—	51	—	—	—	—	—	—	Feels Like Home
2017	"Halfway There" (with Gary Clark Jr)	—	19	—	—	—	—	—	—	—	Be Myself
2017	"Be Myself"	—	—	—	—	—	—	—	—	—	Be Myself
2018	"Wouldn't Want to Be Like You" (with Annie Clark)	—	—	—	—	—	—	—	—	—	Threads
2019	"Redemption Day" (with Johnny Cash)	—	—	—	—	—	—	—	—	—	Threads
2019	"Prove You Wrong" (featuring Stevie Nicks and Maren Morris)	—	—	33	—	—	—	—	—	—	Threads
2019	"Tell Me When It's Over" (featuring Chris Stapleton)	—	38	—	—	—	—	—	—	—	Threads
2020	"Lonely Town, Lonely Street" (featuring Citizen Cope)	—	—	—	—	—	—	—	—	—	Non-album singles
2020	"In the End"	—	—	—	—	—	—	—	—	—	Non-album singles
2022	"Forever"	—	—	—	—	—	—	—	—	—	Sheryl: Music from the Feature Documentary
2023	"Alarm Clock"	—	—	—	—	—	—	—	—	—	Evolution
2024	"Evolution"	—	—	—	—	—	—	—	—	—	Evolution
2024	"Do It Again"	—	—	—	—	—	—	—	—	—	Evolution
2024	"Digging in the Dirt" (featuring Peter Gabriel)	—	—	—	—	—	—	—	—	—	Evolution
2024	"Light a Candle"	—	—	—	—	—	—	—	—	—	—N/a
2025	"I Know"	—	—	—	—	—	—	—	—	—	—N/a
2025	"The New Normal" (with The Real Lowdown)	—	—	—	—	—	—	—	—	—	—N/a
2026	"Freedom Bus" (with Jessie Welles)	—	—	—	—	—	—	—	—	—	Pick You Up
2026	"Freight Train"	—	—	—	—	—	—	—	—	—	Pick You Up
"—" denotes releases that did not chart or were not released to that country.

=== As featured artist ===
Year	Single	Artist	Peak chart positions								Certifications	Album
Year	Single	Artist	US	US Country	US Adult	US AC	US Main	AUS	CAN	UK	Certifications	Album
1997	"Imagine"	Salt-n-Pepa	—	—	—	—	—	—	—	—		Brand New
2001	"Sorcerer"	Stevie Nicks	—	—	—	21	—	—	—	—		Trouble in Shangri-La
2002	"American Girls"	Counting Crows	—	—	24	—	—	—	—	33		Hard Candy
2002	"Picture" (Note: An alternate version with Allison Moorer instead of Crow was released, but it is not included on Cocky.)	Kid Rock	4	21	2	17	5	—	2	—	RIAA: Gold; RMNZ: Gold	Cocky
2006	"Building Bridges"	Brooks & Dunn (with Vince Gill)	66	4	—	—	—	—	—	—		Hillbilly Deluxe
2007	"What You Give Away"	Vince Gill	—	43	—	—	—	—	—	—		These Days
2008	"Just Stand Up!"	Artists Stand Up to Cancer	11	—	35	17	30	39	10	26		—N/a
2010	"Coal Miner's Daughter"	Loretta Lynn (with Miranda Lambert)	—	55	—	—	—	—	—	—		Coal Miner's Daughter: A Tribute To Loretta Lynn
2011	"Collide"	Kid Rock (with Bob Seger)	—	51	—	26	—	—	—	—		Born Free
2014	"Baby, It's Cold Outside"	Darius Rucker	—	—	—	13	—	—	—	—		Home for the Holidays
2015	"Nothing to It!"	The Julius Jr. Garage Band	—	—	—	—	—	—	—	—		—N/a
2015	"Love Song to the Earth"	Various Artists	—	—	—	—	—	—	—	—		—N/a
2017	"This Won't Take Long"	Leslie Satcher and the Electric Honey Badgers (with Vince Gill)	—	—	—	—	—	—	—	—		—N/a
2018	"My Sweet Love"	Reef	—	—	—	—	—	—	—	—		Revelation
2025	"You and Me Time"	James Bay	—	—	—	—	—	—	—	—		Changes All the Time
"—" denotes releases that did not chart

=== Other charted songs ===
Year	Single	Peak chart positions			Album
Year	Single	US AAA	US Country	JPN Over.	Album
1995	"Keep on Growing"	—	—	—	Boys on the Side: Original Soundtrack Album
1999	"The Difficult Kind"	18	—	—	The Globe Sessions
2001	"Behind Blue Eyes"	—	—	—	Substitute: The Songs of The Who
2002	"Safe and Sound"	—	—	—	C'mon, C'mon
2004	"No Depression in Heaven"	—	55	—	The Unbroken Circle: The Musical Heritage of the Carter Family
2004	"Old Habits Die Hard" (with Mick Jagger)	15	—	—	Alfie: Music from the Motion Picture
2004	"Begin the Beguine"	—	—	—	De-Lovely: Music from the Motion Picture
2006	"I Know Why"	25	—	—	Wildflower
2007	"Try Not to Remember"	—	—	—	Home of the Brave (soundtrack)
2008	"Here Comes the Sun"	—	—	—	Bee Movie: Music from the Motion Picture
2008	"Motivation"	14	—	—	Detours
2008	"Detours"	13	—	—	Detours
2009	"Killer Life"	19	—	—	Tuesday Night Music Club (re-issue)
2011	"Long Road Home"	21	—	—	100 Miles from Memphis
2026	"Pick You Up"	—	—	15	Pick You Up

== Videos ==
=== Home videos and television concerts ===
Year	Title	Description	Formats
1995	MTV Unplugged	Live in Brooklyn, New York from February, 1995	Broadcast
1997	Austin City Limits	Music Festival January 31 University of Texas at Austin concert aired on PBS April 12	Broadcast
1997	Live at Glastonbury	Performance from Worthy Farm in Pilton, England on June 29	Broadcast
1997	Sessions at West 54th	Performance from Sony Music Studios on July 25, aired November 29 with Gillian Welch	Broadcast
1997	Live from London	Concert at Shepherd's Bush Empire from November 18, 1996	VHS / Laserdisc / DVD
1998	VH1 Storytellers	Originally aired August 21 and featured a duet with Stevie Nicks	Broadcast
1998	Acoustic Live: Secret Live in Tokyo	Originally aired live October 21 on Wowow	Broadcast
1999	Sheryl Crow and Friends: Live from Central Park	Concert special in New York City	Broadcast
1999	Bridge School Benefit	Shoreline Amphitheatre, Mountain View, California on October 30	Broadcast
2000	Rockin' the Globe Live	Detroit concert in 1999	VHS / DVD
2002	C'mon Make Some Noise	VH1 Special Concert for Breast Cancer Awareness aired March 6	Broadcast
2002	Concert Intime à Montréal	Aired June 2 in Quebec, Canada on the Much Music channel	Broadcast
2002	Live at Budokan	Aired live only in Japan from Nippon Budokan, Tokyo on July 25, released exactly 1 year later on CD	Broadcast
2003	C'Mon America 2003	Recorded live at Fraze Pavilion in Kettering, Ohio, July 10 & 11, 2003	DVD
2003	The Very Best Of Sheryl Crow – The Videos	Collection of 14 music videos	DVD / Download / Streaming
2003	Intimate Portrait	Documentary on Lifetime, aired October 27	Broadcast
2004	Soundstage Part 1 & 2 / Live (Video)	PBS concert series	Broadcast / DVD (2008) / Download / Streaming (2011)
2004	Austin City Limits	Originally aired on PBS November 6	Broadcast
2004	The Globe Sessions DualDisc	Bonus content of 3 music videos and an interview	DVD
2005	Wildflower	Bonus disc of a music video and 7 live studio acoustic versions	DVD / Download / Streaming
2006	Wildflower Tour – Live from New York	Performance from Avery Fisher Hall on October 31, 2005	DVD / Streaming
2007	Biography: Sheryl Crow	Documentary	Broadcast / Streaming
2008	Detours: Amazon Exclusive	Bonus content of 4 live songs filmed in Santa Monica, California for the album release	Streaming
2008	Detours SHM-CD	Bonus disc only in Japan of 5 music videos, 2 studio tracks and 4 acoustic versions	DVD
2008	Control Room Presents: Live from Irving Plaza in New York	Recorded on February 6	Broadcast / Streaming
2008	Live from Abbey Road	Aired July 5 on Channel 4 in the UK	Broadcast
2008	Private Sessions	Aired September 21 on A&E	Broadcast
2009	Tuesday Night Music Club Deluxe Edition	Bonus disc of 7 music videos and a documentary	DVD
2010	Live on Letterman	Recorded live at the Ed Sullivan Theater	Broadcast/Streaming/YouTube/VEVO
2010	Avo Session Basel	Music festival in Switzerland on October 25	DVD
2011	Miles from Memphis Live at the Pantages Theatre	Filmed at The Pantages Theatre on November 16, 2010	Blu-ray / DVD / Download / Streaming
2012	Miles from Memphis	4 track video EP	Download / Streaming / YouTube/VEVO
2013	99.1 WQIK-FM Radio	Live acoustic show from March 12	Streaming
2013	The Live Room	Live studio recording, released August 15 on YouTube	Streaming
2014	Live from the Artists Den	Aired February 5 on American Public Television	Broadcast
2018	Live at the Capitol Theatre	Concert documentary film from November 10, 2017	Theatrical / Broadcast / Blu-ray-2×CD / DVD-2×CD / Download / Streaming

=== Music videos ===
Year	Video	Director	Formats	
1993	"Leaving Las Vegas"	David Hogan	DVD / Download / YouTube/VEVO	
1993	"What I Can Do for You"	David Hogan	Richard Schenkman	DVD / Download / YouTube/VEVO
1993	"All I Wanna Do" (Alternate Edit)	David Hogan	DVD	
1995	"Strong Enough"	Martin Bell	DVD	
1995	"Can't Cry Anymore"	Elizabeth Bailey	DVD / YouTube/VEVO	
1995	"Run Baby Run"	David Hogan/David Cameron	DVD / Download / YouTube/VEVO	
1995	"Home"	Samuel Bayer	DVD / Download / YouTube/VEVO	
1996	"If It Makes You Happy"	Keir McFarlane	DVD / YouTube/VEVO	
1996	"Everyday Is a Winding Road"	Peggy Sirota	DVD / Download / YouTube/VEVO	
1997	"Hard to Make a Stand" (live)	Matthew Amos	VHS / Laserdisc / DVD	
1997	"A Change Would Do You Good" Version 1	Lance Acord/Sheryl Crow	DVD	
1997	"A Change Would Do You Good" Version 2	Michel Gondry	DVD / Download / YouTube/VEVO	
1997	"Home"	Samuel Bayer	DVD / Download / YouTube/VEVO	
1997	"Tomorrow Never Dies"	Daniel Kleinman	DVD	
1997	"Imagine" (w/ Salt-n-Pepa)	Matthew Rolston	YouTube/VEVO	
1998	"My Favorite Mistake"	Samuel Bayer	DVD / YouTube/VEVO	
1998	"There Goes the Neighborhood"	Matthew Rolston	DVD	
1998	"There Goes the Neighborhood" (Alternate Edit)	Matthew Rolston	TV	
1998	"If You Ever Did Believe" (w/ Stevie Nicks)	Rocky Schenck	TV	
1999	"Anything But Down"	Floria Sigismondi	DVD / Download / YouTube/VEVO	
1999	"Sweet Child o' Mine"	Stéphane Sednaoui	DVD	
1999	"There Goes The Neighborhood" (live)	Bruce Gowers	Download / YouTube/VEVO	
1999	"The Difficult Kind" (live w/ Sarah McLachlan)	Bruce Gowers	TV	
2001	"Sorcerer" (w/ Stevie Nicks)	Nancy Bardawil	Download / VEVO	
2002	"Soak Up the Sun"	Wayne Isham	DVD / Download / YouTube/VEVO	
2002	"Steve McQueen"	Wayne Isham	DVD / Download / YouTube/VEVO	
2002	"Safe And Sound" (live)	Dave Diomedi	Download / YouTube/VEVO	
2002	"It's So Easy" (live)	Dave Diomedi	YouTube	
2003	"Picture" (with Kid Rock)	JB Carlin	YouTube	
2003	"The First Cut Is the Deepest"	Wayne Isham	DVD / Download / YouTube/VEVO	
2005	"No Depression in Heaven"	Michael Merriman	TV / Streaming	
2005	"Good Is Good" (animated)	Kylie Matulick/Todd Mueller	DVD / Download / YouTube/VEVO	
2006	"I Know Why" (acoustic)	Martyn Atkins	DVD	
2006	"Always On Your Side" (with Sting)	Nigel Dick	DVD / Download / YouTube/VEVO	
2007	"Shine Over Babylon"	Michael Rothman	DVD / Streaming	
2007	"Lullaby for Wyatt"	Michael Rothman	Download / YouTube/VEVO	
2008	"Love Is Free"	The Malloys	DVD / Download / YouTube/VEVO	
2008	"God Bless This Mess"	Jonathan Sudbury	DVD / Streaming	
2008	"Now That You're Gone"	Wayne Miller	TV / Streaming	
2008	"Out of Our Heads"	Martyn Atkins	DVD / Download / YouTube/VEVO	
2008	"Gasoline" (animated)	Paul Guthrie	DVD / Download / YouTube/VEVO	
2010	"Summer Day"	Wayne Isham	Download / YouTube/VEVO	
2010	"Sign Your Name"	Wayne Isham	Download / YouTube/VEVO	
2010	"Summer Day" (Alternate Version)	Keith Megna	YouTube/VEVO	
2010	"Sideways"	Keith Megna	YouTube/VEVO	
2010	"Coal Miner's Daughter" (with Loretta Lynn and Miranda Lambert)	Deaton-Flanigen Productions	TV / Streaming	
2011	"Collide" (with Kid Rock)	Deaton-Flanigen Productions	YouTube/VEVO	
2012	"The Girl I Love" (with Tony Bennett)	Lee Musiker/Unjoo Moon	YouTube/VEVO	
2012	"The First Cut Is the Deepest" (live)	Martyn Atkins	DVD / VEVO	
2013	"Easy"	Trey Fanjoy	Download / YouTube/VEVO	
2014	"Callin' Me When I'm Lonely" (live)	Michael Thelin	TV / Streaming	
2015	"Love Song to the Earth" (w/ Paul McCartney and others)	Trey Fanjoy	YouTube/VEVO	
2016	"There Goes The Neighborhood" (live)	Unknown	YouTube/VEVO	
2017	"Halfway There"	Gus Black	Download / VEVO	
2017	"Halfway There" (animated)	Unknown	YouTube/VEVO	
2017	"Be Myself" (live)	Bart Peters	Download / YouTube/VEVO	
2017	"Long Way Back" (live)	Martyn Atkins	Download / YouTube/VEVO	
2017	"Roller Skate"	Christopher/Venice Beach Skaters	Download / YouTube/VEVO	
2017	"The Dreaming Kind" (Sandy Hook Promise)	Gus Black	YouTube	
2019	"Redemption Day" (with Johnny Cash)	Shaun Silva	YouTube/VEVO	
2022	"Forever"		YouTube/VEVO	

=== Video appearances ===
Year	Title	Description	Formats
1988	Michael Jackson: From Motown to Your Town	Backup singer	Broadcast
1995	Rock + Roll Hall Of Fame 1995	"Let It Bleed" / "Midnight Rider" (w/ The Allman Brothers Band)	Broadcast
1995	Encomium: A Tribute to Led Zeppelin	Performance of "D'yer Mak'er" in the documentary	VHS/Laserdisc
1997	MTV Unplugged: Finest Moments Volume 1	Performance of "Leaving Las Vegas" from her 1995 episode	UK & Europe Laserdisc
1998	A Very Special Christmas from Washington, D.C.	"Rockin' Around the Christmas Tree" (w/ Mary J. Blige) / "Merry Christmas Baby" (w/ Eric Clapton) / "Santa Claus Is Comin' to Town" (w/ everyone)	Broadcast
1999	MTV Unplugged: Classic Moments	Performance of "Leaving Las Vegas" from her 1995 episode	DVD
1999	In Concert: A Benefit for the Crossroads Centre at Antigua	3 collaborations with Eric Clapton	DVD
1999	Woodstock 99	Performance of "If It Makes You Happy"	Broadcast/VHS/DVD
1999	An All-Star Tribute to Johnny Cash	"Jackson" & "Orange Blossom Special" (w/ Willie Nelson) / "Flesh and Blood" (w/ Mary Chapin Carpenter & Emmylou Harris)	Broadcast
2000	MTV Unplugged: Ballads	Performance of "Strong Enough" from her 1995 episode	DVD
2000	Lilith Fair: A Celebration Of Women In Music	2 solo songs and 2 collaborations	VHS/DVD
2000	A Very Special Christmas from Washington, D.C.	"Run Rudolph Run"	Broadcast
2001	VH1 Storytellers Classics	Performance of "My Favorite Mistake" from her 1998 episode	DVD
2001	All Access: Front Row. Backstage. Live!	Performance of "If It Makes You Happy"	IMAX Theatrical/Broadcast
2002	CMT Crossroads with Willie Nelson	Recorded February 12 at the Sony Pictures Studios in L.A., aired on June 16	Broadcast
2003	The Rolling Stones: Four Flicks	Disc 2: Arena Show – "Honky Tonk Women"	DVD
2004	Soundstage: Farm Aid – A Very Special Live Performance for the Heartland of America	"Steve McQueen" and "The First Cut Is the Deepest"	Broadcast/DVD
2005	Willie Nelson & Friends: Live and Kickin'	"Me and Bobby McGee" (w/ Kris Kristofferson) / "Do Right Woman" from 2003 performance	Broadcast/DVD
2005	Austin City Limits Music Festival: Live from Austin, Texas 2004	"Light In Your Eyes"	Broadcast/DVD
2005	Shelter from the Storm: A Concert for the Gulf Coast	"The Water Is Wide"	Broadcast/DVD
2007	A Very Special Christmas: The 20th Anniversary Music Video Collection	"Run Rudolph Run"	DVD
2007	Eric Clapton: Crossroads Guitar Festival 2007	"If It Makes You Happy" / "Tulsa Time" / "On the Road Again" (w/ Vince Gill & Albert Lee)	DVD
2009	Michel Gondry 2: More Videos (Before and After DVD 1)	"A Change Would Do You Good" Version 2 music video	DVD
2010	Eric Clapton: Crossroads Guitar Festival 2010	"Long Road Home" & "Our Love Is Fading" (w/ Gary Clark Jr.) / "Lay Down Sally" (w/ Vince Gill, Keb' Mo' & Albert Lee)	DVD/Blu-ray
2010	Hope for Haiti Now	"Lean on Me" (w/ Kid Rock & Keith Urban)	Broadcast/Download
2010	Rock And Roll Hall Of Fame + Museum – Live	Disc 9: "Midnight Rider" (w/ The Allman Brothers Band)	DVD
2011	Spectacle: Elvis Costello with...: Season Two	Episode: Neko Case, Sheryl Crow, Ron Sexsmith, Jesse Winchester	Broadcast/DVD/Blu-ray
2011	The Bridge School Concerts: 25th Anniversary Edition	Performance of "The Difficult Kind"	DVD
2012	We Walk the Line: A Celebration of the Music of Johnny Cash	"Cry! Cry! Cry!" / "If I Were a Carpenter" (w/ Willie Nelson) / "I Walk the Line" (w/ everyone)	Broadcast/Download/VEVO/DVD/Blu-ray
2012	Bad 25 / Live at Wembley July 16, 1988	Backup singer and duet on "I Just Can't Stop Loving You"	Broadcast/Download/DVD
2013	CMT Crossroads with Willie Nelson & Friends Live at Third Man Records	Aired June 23, with Norah Jones, Leon Russell, Jack White & Neil Young	Broadcast
2017	Change Begins Within: A Benefit Concert For The David Lynch Foundation	"My Sweet Lord" (w/ Ben Harper) / "Yellow Submarine" (w/ Ringo Starr, Ben Harper & Eddie Vedder) / "Cosmically Conscious" & 'I Saw Her Standing There" (w/ Paul McCartney, Ringo Starr & everyone)	Broadcast/Download/VEVO/DVD

== Guest appearances ==
Title	Year	Credited artist(s)	Album
—N/a	1989	Jimmy Buffett	Off to See the Lizard
"Little Black Book"	1991	Belinda Carlisle	Live Your Life Be Free
"Half the World"	1991	Belinda Carlisle	Live Your Life Be Free
"World of Love"	1991	Belinda Carlisle	Live Your Life Be Free
"Leap of Faith"	1991	Kenny Loggins	Leap of Faith
"If You Believe"	1991	Kenny Loggins	Leap of Faith
"I Would Do Anything"	1991	Kenny Loggins (featuring Sheryl Crow)	Leap of Faith
"Baby Don't Go"	1997	Dwight Yoakam (featuring Sheryl Crow)	Under The Covers
"Lady, Your Roof Brings Me Down"	1998	Scott Weiland	12 Bar Blues
"Everyday Is a Winding Road"	1999	Prince	Rave Un2 the Joy Fantastic
"Baby Knows"	1999	Prince (featuring Sheryl Crow)	Rave Un2 the Joy Fantastic
"Field of Diamonds"	2000	Johnny Cash	American III: Solitary Man
"Mary of the Wild Moor"	2000	Johnny Cash	American III: Solitary Man
"Wayfaring Stranger"	2000	Johnny Cash	American III: Solitary Man
"Good Morning Heartache"	2001	Tony Bennett (featuring Sheryl Crow)	Playin' with My Friends: Bennett Sings the Blues
"Candlebright"	2001	Stevie Nicks	Trouble in Shangri-La
"Too Far from Texas"	2001	Stevie Nicks	Trouble in Shangri-La
"Sorcerer"	2001	Stevie Nicks	Trouble in Shangri-La
"That Made Me Stronger"	2001	Stevie Nicks	Trouble in Shangri-La
"It's Only Love"	2001	Stevie Nicks	Trouble in Shangri-La
"Fall from Grace"	2001	Stevie Nicks	Trouble in Shangri-La
"American Girls"	2002	Counting Crows	Hard Candy
"Say You Will"	2003	Fleetwood Mac	Say You Will
"Silver Girl"	2003	Fleetwood Mac	Say You Will
"Beautiful Pain"	2003	Rosanne Cash	Rules of Travel
"Love Me Like That"	2003	Michelle Branch (with Sheryl Crow)	Hotel Paper
"Run Off to LA"	2003	Kid Rock	Kid Rock: Kid Rock
"Honky Tonk Women"	2004	Rolling Stones (with Sheryl Crow)	Live Licks
"Blue"	2004	Zucchero Fornaciari (with Sheryl Crow)	Zu & Co.
"Two"	2007	Ryan Adams	Easy Tiger
"Cold Ground"	2008	Rusty Truck	Luck's Changing Lanes
"You Are My Sunshine"	2010	Jerry Lee Lewis (with Jon Brion and Sheryl Crow)	Mean Old Man
"Need a Little Love"	2010	Hannah Montana (featuring Sheryl Crow)	Hannah Montana Forever
"The Girl I Love"	2011	Tony Bennett (with Sheryl Crow)	Duets II
"Collide"	2011	Kid Rock (featuring Bob Seger and Sheryl Crow)	Born Free
"Come On Up to the House"	2012	Willie Nelson (featuring Lukas Nelson and Sheryl Crow)	Heroes
"So Goddam Smart"	2012	John Mellencamp, Dave Alvin, Phil Alvin, and Sheryl Crow	Ghost Brothers of Darkland County
"Home Again"	2012	Dave Alvin, Phil Alvin, Taj Mahal, and Sheryl Crow	Ghost Brothers of Darkland County
"Deep as It Is Wide"	2013	Amy Grant (featuring Eric Paslay and Sheryl Crow)	How Mercy Looks from Here
"Love Don't Die Easy"	2013	Charlie Worsham	Rubberband
"Far Away Places"	2013	Willie Nelson (featuring Sheryl Crow)	To All the Girls...
"The Tears of a Clown"	2014	Smokey Robinson	Smokey & Friends
"Tulsa Time"	2016	Sheryl Crow (with Eric Clapton, Vince Gill, Albert Lee, and Sheryl Crow)	Crossroads Revisited – Selections from the Crossroads Guitar Festivals
"On the Road Again"	2016	Willie Nelson (with Vince Gill, Albert Lee, and Sheryl Crow)	Crossroads Revisited – Selections from the Crossroads Guitar Festivals
"Lay Down Sally"	2016	Sheryl Crow with Eric Clapton, Doyle Bramhall II, and Gary Clark Jr.)	Crossroads Revisited – Selections from the Crossroads Guitar Festivals
"Our Love Is Fading"	2016	Vince Gill (with Keb' Mo', Albert Lee, James Burton, Earl Klugh, and Sheryl Crow)	Crossroads Revisited – Selections from the Crossroads Guitar Festivals
"In the Blood"	2017	John Mayer	The Search for Everything
"I'm Tied to Ya"	2017	Rodney Crowell (featuring Sheryl Crow)	Close Ties
"Hold On"	2020	Yola (with The Highwomen featuring Sheryl Crow)	—N/a
"How Can You Mend a Broken Heart"	2021	Barry Gibb (featuring Sheryl Crow)	Greenfields
"Promised Land (Collab OG)"	2021 (Note: The original version of the song simply titled "Promised Land" was released on September 17, 2021 whilst the "Re-Imagined" version with Crow was released in January 2022.)	TobyMac (featuring Sheryl Crow)	Life After Death
"Promised Land (Collab New)"	2021	TobyMac (featuring Sheryl Crow)	—N/a
"—" denotes she wasn't on one song, but an entire album or song didn't appear on an album.

== Soundtracks ==
=== Films ===
- 1991: Point Break (Music from the Motion Picture) – "Hundreds of Tears"
- 1993: Kalifornia – "No One Said It Would Be Easy"
- 1995: Boys on the Side (Original Soundtrack Album) – "Keep On Growing" / "Somebody Stand by Me" (writer only)
- 1997: Tomorrow Never Dies (Music from the Motion Picture) – "Tomorrow Never Dies"
- 1998: Hope Floats: Music from the Motion Picture – "In Need"
- 1998: The Faculty (Music from the Dimension Motion Picture) – "Resuscitation"
- 1998: Practical Magic (Music from the Motion Picture) – "If You Ever Did Believe" / "Crystal" (music producer and guest vocals w/ Stevie Nicks)
- 1999: Big Daddy (Music from the Motion Picture) – "Sweet Child o' Mine"
- 1999: Message in a Bottle (Music from and Inspired by the Motion Picture) – "Carolina"
- 2000: Steal This Movie! (Music from the Motion Picture) – "Time Has Come Today" (w/ Steve Earle)
- 2001: Bridget Jones's Diary: Music from the Motion Picture – "Kiss That Girl"
- 2001: I Am Sam (Music from and Inspired by the Motion Picture) – "Mother Nature's Son"
- 2004: Alfie (Music from the Motion Picture) – "Old Habits Die Hard" (w/ Mick Jagger and David A. Stewart)
- 2004: De-Lovely (Music from the Motion Picture) – "Begin the Beguine"
- 2006: Cars (Original Soundtrack) – "Real Gone"
- 2006: Home of the Brave (Original Motion Picture Soundtrack) – "Try Not To Remember"
- 2007: Bee Movie (Music from The Motion Picture) – "Here Comes the Sun"

=== Television ===
- 1996: The X-Files – Songs in the Key of X: Music from and Inspired by the X-Files – "On the Outside"
- 1997: Live On Letterman: Music from the Late Show – "Strong Enough" (live)
- 1999: King of the Hill (Music from and Inspired by the TV Series) – "Straight to the Moon"
- 2000: VH1 Storytellers – "Strong Enough" (live w/ Stevie Nicks from 1998)
- 2001: The Best of Sessions at West 54th – "Everyday Is A Winding Road" (live from 1997)
- 2002: The Very Best of MTV Unplugged – "Strong Enough" (live from 1995)
- 2003: The Very Best of MTV Unplugged 2 – "Run, Baby, Run" (live from 1995)
- 2004: The Very Best Of MTV Unplugged 3 – "Leaving Las Vegas" (live from 1995)
- 2008: Californication, Season 2: Music from the Showtime Series – "Behind Blue Eyes"
- 2009: NCIS: The Official TV Soundtrack - Vol. 2 – "Murder In My Heart"

=== Live specials ===
- 1994: Woodstock 94 – "Run, Baby, Run"
- 1996: Pavarotti & Friends: For War Child – "Run, Baby, Run" (w/ Eric Clapton) / "Là ci darem la mano" (w/ Luciano Pavarotti)
- 1998: Burt Bacharach – One Amazing Night – "One Less Bell to Answer"
- 1999: Woodstock 1999 – "If It Makes You Happy"
- 1999: A Very Special Christmas from Washington, D.C. – "Rockin' Around the Christmas Tree" (w/ Mary J. Blige) / "Merry Christmas Baby" (w/ Eric Clapton) / "Santa Claus Is Comin' to Town" (w/ everyone)
- 2001: America: A Tribute to Heroes – "Safe and Sound"
- 2001: A Very Special Christmas 5 – "Run Rudolph Run"
- 2002: Willie Nelson & Friends – Stars & Guitars – "Whiskey River" / "For What It's Worth" (duets w/ Willie Nelson)
- 2010: Hope for Haiti Now – "Lean on Me" (w/ Kid Rock & Keith Urban)
- 2011: Best of Rock and Roll Hall of Fame + Museum: Live – "Midnight Rider" (w/ The Allman Brothers Band) from 1995 broadcast
- 2011: The Bridge School Concerts: 25th Anniversary Edition – "The Difficult Kind"
- 2012: We Walk the Line: A Celebration of the Music of Johnny Cash – "Cry! Cry! Cry!" / "If I Were a Carpenter" (w/ Willie Nelson) / "I Walk the Line" (w/ everyone)
- 2013: Willie Nelson & Friends – Live at Third Man Records – "Far Away Places" / "Whiskey River"

=== Original music with no soundtrack album ===
- 1990: Cop Rock episode "Bang the Potts Slowly" – "I Got Somethin' for You"
- 1991: Bright Angel – "Heal Somebody"
- 1991: Stone Cold – "Welcome to the Real Life"
- 1995: The Pompatus of Love – "The Joker"
- 1996: For Hope – "My Funny Valentine"
- 2009: Cougar Town episode "Everything Man" – "Everything Man"
- 2012: Katie – "This Day" (theme song)
- 2012: GCB episode "Forbidden Fruit" – "The Gospel According to Me"
- 2013: The Hot Flashes – "Leaning in a New Direction"
- 2015: The Tonight Show Starring Jimmy Fallon December 15, 2015 episode – "Revolution (Beatles song)" (w/ The Roots)
- 2016: A Boy Called Po – "Dancing with Your Shadow"

== Compilation appearances ==
=== Tribute albums ===
- 1994: If I Were a Carpenter – "Solitaire"
- 1995: Encomium: A Tribute to Led Zeppelin – "D'yer Mak'er"
- 1999: Return of the Grievous Angel: A Tribute to Gram Parsons – "Juanita" (w/ Emmylou Harris)
- 2001: Good Rockin' Tonight – The Legacy of Sun Records – "Who Will the Next Fool Be?"
- 2001: Timeless – "Long Gone Lonesome Blues"
- 2001: Substitute – The Songs of The Who – "Behind Blue Eyes"
- 2002: Kindred Spirits: A Tribute to the Songs of Johnny Cash – "Flesh and Blood" (w/ Mary Chapin Carpenter & Emmylou Harris)
- 2004: The Unbroken Circle: The Musical Heritage of the Carter Family – "No Depression in Heaven"
- 2007: Anchored in Love: A Tribute to June Carter Cash – "If I Were a Carpenter" (w/ Willie Nelson)
- 2010: Coal Miner's Daughter: A Tribute to Loretta Lynn – "Coal Miner's Daughter" (w/ Loretta Lynn & Miranda Lambert)
- 2011: The Lost Notebooks of Hank Williams – "Angel Mine"

=== Benefit albums ===
- 1997: A Very Special Christmas 3 – "Blue Christmas"
- 1998: AT&T Presents Stormy Weather – "Good Morning Heartache" (live)
- 2004: Marlo Thomas and Friends: Thanks & Giving All Year Long – "All Kinds of People"
- 2015: Orthophonic Joy – "The Wandering Boy" (w/ Vince Gill)
