= Sheryl: Music from the Feature Documentary =

Soundtrack album greatest hits by Sheryl Crow
- Released: May 6, 2022
- Genre: Rock
- Length: 152:29
- Language: English
- Label: A&M

Sheryl Crow chronology
Live from the Ryman and More (2021)	Sheryl: Music from the Feature Documentary (2022)

Sheryl: Music from the Feature Documentary is a 2022 compilation album that serves as a soundtrack to the documentary film Sheryl, a documentary about the American singer-songwriter's multi-decade career in popular music.

== Reception ==
Writing for Pitchfork Media, Stephen Thomas Erlewine scored this compilation 6.8 out of 10, criticizing the sequencing for "emphasiz[ing] continuity over evolution" and glossing over two decade's of Crow's career by emphasizing tracks from her first few albums. Editors of AllMusic Guide scored this release four out of five stars, with reviewer Timothy Monger calling this "a testament to Sheryl Crow's staying power and a generous overview of the singer/songwriter's range of strengths".

== Track listing ==
1. "If It Makes You Happy" (Sheryl Crow and Jeff Trott) – 5:23
2. "Leaving Las Vegas" (David Baerwald, Bill Bottrell, Crow, Kevin Gilbert, and David Ricketts) – 5:08
3. "All I Wanna Do" (Baerwald, Bottrell, Wyn Cooper, Crow, and Gilbert) – 4:32
4. "What I Can Do for You" (Baerwald and Crow) – 4:15
5. "Run, Baby, Run" (Baerwald, Bottrell, and Crow) – 4:51
6. "Hard to Make a Stand" (Bottrell, Roy Scott Bryan, Crow, and Todd Wolfe) – 3:06
7. "Sweet Rosalyn" (Crow and Trott) – 3:58
8. "A Change Would Do You Good" (Crow, Brian MacLeod, and Trott) – 3:50
9. "Home" (Crow) – 4:50
10. "Love Is a Good Thing" (Crow and Tad Wadhams) – 4:42
11. "Strong Enough" (Baerwald, Bottrell, Crow, Gilbert, MacLeod, and Ricketts) – 3:10
12. "Can’t Cry Anymore" (Bottrell and Crow) – 3:41
13. "Everyday Is a Winding Road" (Crow, MacLeod, and Trott) – 4:16
14. "Redemption Day" (Crow) – 4:26
15. "The Difficult Kind (live) (Crow) – 5:55
16. "I Shall Believe" (Bottrell and Crow) – 5:32
17. "Real Gone (live) (Crow and John Shanks) – 4:00
18. "My Favorite Mistake" (Crow and Trott) – 4:05
19. "Riverwide" (Crow) – 4:07
20. "Crash and Burn" (Crow and Trott) – 6:41
21. "Steve McQueen" (Crow and Shanks) – 3:25
22. "Soak Up the Sun" (Crow and Trott) – 4:51
23. "Out of Our Heads" (Bottrell and Crow) – 4:27
24. "Detours" (Crow) – 3:28
25. "Be Myself" (Crow and Trott) – 4:21
26. "Prove You Wrong" (Al Anderson, Crow, and Leslie Satcher) – 3:55
27. "Tell Me When It’s Over" (Crow and Chris Stapleton) – 4:56
28. "Beware of Darkness" (George Harrison) – 3:55
29. "The Worst" (Jagger/Richards) – 2:38
30. "Story of Everything" (Carlton Ridenhour, Crow, and Steve Jordan) – 6:22
31. "Everything Is Broken" (live) (Bob Dylan) – 4:32
32. "Redemption Day" (Crow) – 4:46
33. "Forever" (Crow) – 3:49
34. "Still the Same" (Crow) – 4:14
35. "Live with Me" (Jagger/Richards) – 3:30
