= Hits and Rarities =

Greatest hits album by Sheryl Crow
- Released: November 12, 2007
- Recorded: 1993–2007
- Length: 140:54
- Label: A&M
- Producers: Sheryl Crow; Bill Bottrell; Garth Fundis; Kid Rock; John Shanks; Jeff Trott

Sheryl Crow chronology
Wildflower (2005)	Hits and Rarities (2007)	Detours (2008)

Hits and Rarities is a second greatest hits album by American singer/songwriter Sheryl Crow, released on November 12, 2007 in Europe. It was released as single disc and a limited edition two-disc version. AllMusic gave it a 3.5/5 rating.

== Track listing ==
1. "All I Wanna Do" (from Tuesday Night Music Club) – 4:34
2. "My Favorite Mistake" (from The Globe Sessions) – 4:05
3. "Soak Up the Sun" (from C'mon, C'mon) – 4:51
4. "Always on Your Side" (featuring Sting) (from Wildflower) – 4:10
5. "The First Cut Is The Deepest" (from The Very Best of Sheryl Crow) – 3:45
6. "Everyday Is A Winding Road" (from Sheryl Crow) – 4:17
7. "Try Not To Remember" (from Home of the Brave Soundtrack) – 4:39
8. "Leaving Las Vegas" (from Tuesday Night Music Club) – 5:08
9. "Strong Enough" (from Tuesday Night Music Club) – 3:10
10. "If It Makes You Happy" (from Sheryl Crow) – 5:21
11. "Run Baby Run" (from Tuesday Night Music Club) – 4:51
12. "I Shall Believe" (from Tuesday Night Music Club) – 5:33
13. "Light In Your Eyes" (from The Very Best of Sheryl Crow) – 4:01
14. "C'mon, C'mon" (from C'mon, C'mon) – 4:25
15. "A Change Would Do You Good" (from Sheryl Crow) – 3:50
16. "Wildflower" (from Wildflower) – 3:57
17. "Sweet Child o' Mine" (from Big Daddy Soundtrack and later pressings of The Globe Sessions) – 3:51
18. "Tomorrow Never Dies" (from Tomorrow Never Dies Soundtrack) – 4:50

=== Hits and Rarities (Limited Edition) ===
1. "Run Baby Run" (Live with Eric Clapton) (original version on Tuesday Night Music Club) – 6:07
2. "Chances Are" (original version on Wildflower) – 5:14
3. "You're An Original" (Live From Budokan) (original version on C'mon, C'mon and B-side to Soak Up The Sun single) – 5:52
4. "The Difficult Kind" (Live From Budokan) (original version on The Globe Sessions) – 5:39
5. "Where Has All The Love Gone" (Acoustic Version) (original version on Wildflower) – 3:40
6. "Steve McQueen" (Live Radio Portugal) (original version on C'mon, C'mon) – 3:26
7. "Riverwide" (Live for Wise Buddha) (original version on The Globe Sessions) – 4:14
8. "Everyday Is A Winding Road" (AOL Live) (original version on Sheryl Crow) – 5:04
9. "Subway Ride" (hidden track on The Globe Sessions and B-side to My Favorite Mistake single) – 3:57
10. "Leaving Las Vegas" (Live from Budokan) (original version on Tuesday Night Music Club) – 7:20
11. "Safe And Sound" (Live From Budokan) (original version on C'mon, C'mon) – 5:36
12. "Keep On Growing" (from Boys on the Side OST) – 5:27.
