= Everyday Is a Winding Road =

1996 single by Sheryl Crow

Single by Sheryl Crow

from the album Sheryl Crow
- B-side: "Sad Sad World"; "In Need"; "On the Outside" (live)
- Released: November 18, 1996
- Studio: Kingsway (New Orleans)
- Genre: Rock; pop
- Length: 4:16
- Label: A&M
- Songwriters: Sheryl Crow; Jeff Trott; Brian MacLeod
- Producer: Sheryl Crow

Sheryl Crow singles chronology
"If It Makes You Happy" (1996)	"Everyday Is a Winding Road" (1996)	"Hard to Make a Stand" (1997)

Music video
- "Sheryl Crow - Everyday Is A Winding Road (Official Music Video)" on YouTube

"Everyday Is a Winding Road" is the second single from American singer-songwriter Sheryl Crow's 1996 eponymous album. Neil Finn, lead singer of rock band Crowded House, provides backing vocals, while Paul Hester, another member of the band, was the inspiration for the song. The song was issued in the United Kingdom in November 1996 and was released in the United States the following year.

The single was well-received on the radio and peaked at number 11 on the US Billboard Hot 100 chart. It also reached number 12 on the UK Singles Chart and became Crow's fourth and final number-one single in Canada. The song received a nomination for Record of the Year at the 1998 Grammy Awards, losing to "Sunny Came Home" by Shawn Colvin. Billboard and The Guardian both named it as Crow's second-best song.

A music video for this song was directed by Peggy Sirota and filmed in New York City in sepia tone. It features a toy airplane flying from person to person throughout the city.

== Composition ==
The song is composed in the key of D-flat mixolydian with a tempo of 100 beats per minute. Greg Kot of the Chicago Tribune said the song "blatantly swipes" from the Rolling Stones' song "Sympathy for the Devil".

== Track listings ==
US 7-inch single

A. "Everyday Is a Winding Road" (LP version) – 4:16
B. "Sad Sad World" – 4:05

US CD single

1. "Everyday Is a Winding Road" (LP version) – 4:16
2. "Sad Sad World" – 4:05
3. "In Need" – 5:53
4. "On the Outside" (live from Shepherd's Bush Empire) – 7:40

European and Japanese CD single

1. "Everyday Is a Winding Road" – 4:16
2. "Free Man" – 3:20
3. "Run Baby Run" (live at Woodstock) – 5:28
4. "Ordinary Morning" – 3:55

UK CD1 (includes four postcards)

1. "Everyday Is a Winding Road" (LP version) – 4:16
2. "Strong Enough" (LP version) – 3:10
3. "Can't Cry Anymore" (LP version) – 3:41
4. "What I Can Do for You" (LP version) – 4:15

UK CD2

1. "Everyday Is a Winding Road" (LP version) – 4:16
2. "If It Makes You Happy" (Live BBC Simon Mayo Session) – 5:06
3. "All I Wanna Do" (Live BBC Simon Mayo Session) – 4:30
4. "Run Baby Run" (Live BBC Simon Mayo Session) – 5:53

== Credits and personnel ==
Credits are lifted from the UK CD1 liner notes and the Sheryl Crow album booklet.

Studios

- Recorded at Kingsway Studios (New Orleans)
- Mastered at Gateway Mastering (Portland, Maine, US)

Personnel

- Sheryl Crow – writing, bass, Hammond organ, Harmonium, production
- Jeff Trott – writing, guitars
- Brian MacLeod – writing, loop
- Neil Finn – vocals
- Steve Donnelly – guitars
- Mitchell Froom – dueling Harmonium
- Michael Urbano – drums
- Trina Shoemaker – recording
- Tchad Blake – mixing
- Bob Ludwig – mastering

== Charts ==
=== Weekly charts ===
Chart (1996–1997)	Peak position
Australia (ARIA)	67
Canada Top Singles (RPM)	1
Canada Adult Contemporary (RPM)	8
Europe (Eurochart Hot 100)	51
European Hit Radio (Music & Media)	18
Europe Atlantic Crossovers (Music & Media)	10
Finland (Suomen virallinen singlelista)	32
Iceland (Íslenski Listinn Topp 40)	14
Netherlands (Single Top 100)	79
Quebec (ADISQ)	3
Scottish Singles Sales (Official Charts)	6
UK Singles (Official Charts)	12
US Billboard Hot 100	11
US Adult Alternative Airplay (Billboard)	3
US Adult Contemporary (Billboard)	28
US Adult Pop Airplay (Billboard)	4
US Alternative Airplay (Billboard)	17
US Mainstream Rock (Billboard)	31
US Pop Airplay (Billboard)	5

=== Year-end charts ===
Chart (1997)	Position
Canada Top Singles (RPM)	10
Canada Adult Contemporary (RPM)	60
US Billboard Hot 100	60
US Adult Top 40 (Billboard)	16
US Modern Rock Tracks (Billboard)	64
US Top 40/Mainstream (Billboard)	30
US Triple-A (Billboard)	11

== Certifications ==
Region	Certification	Certified units/sales
Australia (ARIA)	Gold	35,000^{‡}
^{‡} Sales+streaming figures based on certification alone.

== Release history ==
Region	Date	Format(s)	Label(s)	Ref.
United Kingdom	November 18, 1996	CD; cassette	A&M	
United States	January 14, 1997	Contemporary hit radio	A&M	
Japan	January 25, 1997	CD	A&M	
