= 37th Annual Grammy Awards =

1995 US music awards ceremony

- Date: March 1, 1995
- Location: Shrine Auditorium, Los Angeles
- Hosted by: Paul Reiser
- Most awards: Bruce Springsteen (4)
- Most nominations: Babyface and Boyz II Men (6)

Television/radio coverage
- Network: CBS

The 37th Annual Grammy Awards were presented on March 1, 1995, at Shrine Auditorium, Los Angeles. They recognized accomplishments by musicians from the previous year. Bruce Springsteen was the night's biggest winner with 4 awards, including Song of the Year while opening the show with his Grammy nominated hit.

== Performances ==
Artist(s)	Song(s)
Salt-N-Pepa	"Whatta Man" "None of Your Business"
Mary Chapin Carpenter	"He Thinks He'll Keep Her"
John Michael Montgomery; All-4-One	"I Swear"
Tony Bennett k.d. lang	"Moonglow"
Sheryl Crow	"All I Wanna Do"
Babyface	"When Can I See You"
Bonnie Raitt	"Love Sneakin' Up On You"
Melissa Etheridge	"Come To My Window"
Luther Vandross; Crosby, Stills & Nash; Booker T. & the M.G.'s	"Love the One You're With"
Bruce Springsteen	"Streets of Philadelphia"
Boyz II Men	"I'll Make Love To You"
Rollins Band	"Liar"

== Presenters ==
Presenter(s)	Award(s)
Anita Baker & Vince Gill	Record of the Year & Album of the Year
Annie Lennox & George Michael	Song of the Year
Liz Phair & Adam Sandler	Best New Artist
Curtis Mayfield & Meshell Ndegeocello	Best R&B Performance by a Duo or Group with Vocals
Carly Simon & Tori Amos	Best Male Rock Vocal Performance
Celine Dion & Andy Williams	Best Pop Collaboration with Vocals
Jon Secada, Cassandra Wilson & Ruben Blades	Best Jazz Instrumental Album, Individual or Group
B.B. King & Al Green	Best Metal Performance
Coolio & Des'ree	Best Rap Performance by a Duo or Group
John Michael Montgomery & All-4-One	Producer of the Year
Steven Curtis Chapman, Faith Hill & Dwight Yoakam	Best Country Album

== Award winners ==
=== General ===
Record of the Year

- "All I Wanna Do" – Sheryl Crow
  - Bill Bottrell, producer
- "Streets of Philadelphia" – Bruce Springsteen
  - Chuck Plotkin, Bruce Springsteen, producers
- "Love Sneakin' Up On You" – Bonnie Raitt
  - Bonnie Raitt, Don Was, producers
- "I'll Make Love to You" – Boyz II Men
  - Babyface, producer
- "He Thinks He'll Keep Her" – Mary Chapin Carpenter
  - Mary Chapin Carpenter, John Jennings, producers

Album of the Year

- MTV Unplugged – Tony Bennett
  - David Kahne, producer
- The Three Tenors in Concert 1994 – José Carreras, Plácido Domingo, Luciano Pavarotti, Zubin Mehta
  - Tibor Rudas, producer
- Seal – Seal
  - Trevor Horn, producer
- Longing in Their Hearts – Bonnie Raitt
  - Bonnie Raitt, Don Was, producers
- From the Cradle – Eric Clapton
  - Eric Clapton, Russ Titelman, producers

Song of the Year

- "Streets of Philadelphia"
  - Bruce Springsteen, songwriter (Springsteen)
- I Swear
  - Gary Baker, Frank J. Myers, songwriters (All-4-One, and separately John Michael Montgomery)
- Circle of Life
  - Elton John, Tim Rice, songwriters (John)
- Can You Feel the Love Tonight
  - Elton John, Tim Rice, songwriters (John)
- All I Wanna Do
  - David Baerwald, Bill Bottrell, Wyn Cooper, Sheryl Crow, Kevin Gilbert, songwriters (Crow)

Best New Artist

- Sheryl Crow
- Green Day
- Crash Test Dummies
- Counting Crows
- Ace of Base

=== Alternative ===
- Best Alternative Music Performance
  - Green Day for Dookie

=== Blues ===
- Best Traditional Blues Album
  - Eric Clapton for From the Cradle
- Best Contemporary Blues Album
  - Pops Staples for Father Father

=== Children's ===
- Best Musical Album for Children
  - Mark Mancina, Jay Rifkin, Chris Thomas, Hans Zimmer (producers) & various artists for The Lion King - Original Motion Picture Soundtrack
- Best Spoken Word Album for Children
  - Ted Kryczko, Randy Thornton (producers) & Robert Guillaume for The Lion King Read-Along

=== Classical ===
- Best Orchestral Performance
  - Pierre Boulez (conductor) & the Chicago Symphony Orchestra for Bartók: Concerto for Orchestra; Four Orchestral Pieces, Op. 12
- Best Classical Vocal Performance
  - Cecilia Bartoli for The Impatient Lover - Italian Songs by Beethoven, Schubert, Mozart
- Best Opera Recording
  - Martin Sauer (producer), Kent Nagano (conductor), Kenn Chester, Jerry Hadley, Samuel Ramey, Cheryl Studer, & the Orchestre of Opera De Lyon & Chorus for Floyd: Susannah
- Best Choral Performance
  - John Eliot Gardiner (choir director), the Monteverdi Choir & the Orchestre Révolutionnaire et Romantique for Berlioz: Messe Solennelle
- Best Instrumental Soloist Performance (with orchestra)
  - David Zinman (conductor), Yo-Yo Ma & the Baltimore Symphony Orchestra for The New York Album - Works of Albert, Bartók & Bloch
- Best Instrumental Soloist Performance Without Orchestra
  - Emanuel Ax for Haydn: Piano Sonatas, Nos. 32, 47, 53, 59
- Best Chamber Music Performance
  - Daniel Barenboim, Dale Clevenger, Larry Combs, Daniele Damiano, Hansjörg Schellenberger & the Berlin Philharmonic for Beethoven/Mozart: Quintets (Chicago-Berlin)
- Best Classical Contemporary Composition
  - Stephen Albert (composer), David Zinman (conductor) & Yo-Yo Ma for Albert: Cello Concerto
- Best Classical Album
  - Karl-August Naegler (producer), Pierre Boulez (conductor) & the Chicago Symphony Orchestra for Bartók: Concerto for Orchestra; Four Orchestral Pieces, Op. 12

=== Comedy ===
- From 1994 through 2003, see "Best Spoken Comedy Album" under the "Spoken Word" field, below.

=== Composing and arranging ===
- Best Instrumental Composition
  - Michael Brecker (composer) for "African Skies"
- Best Song Written Specifically for a Motion Picture or for Television
  - Bruce Springsteen (composer) for "Streets of Philadelphia"
- Best Instrumental Composition Written for a Motion Picture or for Television
  - John Williams (composer) for Schindler's List
- Best Instrumental Arrangement
  - Dave Grusin (arranger) for "Three Cowboy Songs"
- Best Instrumental Arrangement with Accompanying Vocals
  - Hans Zimmer & Lebo Morake (arrangers) for "Circle of Life" performed by Carmen Twillie

=== Country ===
- Best Female Country Vocal Performance
  - Mary Chapin Carpenter for "Shut Up and Kiss Me"
- Best Male Country Vocal Performance
  - Vince Gill for "When Love Finds You"
- Best Country Performance by a Duo or Group with Vocal
  - Asleep at the Wheel & Lyle Lovett for "Blues for Dixie"
- Best Country Vocal Collaboration
  - Aaron Neville & Trisha Yearwood for "I Fall to Pieces"
- Best Country Instrumental Performance
  - Chet Atkins for "Young Thing"
- Best Country Song
  - Gary Baker & Frank J. Myers for "I Swear" performed by John Michael Montgomery
- Best Country Album
  - Mary Chapin Carpenter for Stones in the Road
- Best Bluegrass Album
  - Jerry Douglas & Tut Taylor (producers) for The Great Dobro Sessions performed by various artists

=== Folk ===
- Best Traditional Folk Album
  - Bob Dylan for World Gone Wrong
- Best Contemporary Folk Album
  - Johnny Cash for American Recordings

=== Gospel ===
- Best Pop/Contemporary Gospel Album
  - Andrae Crouch for Mercy
- Best Rock Gospel Album
  - Petra for Wake-Up Call
- Best Traditional Soul Gospel Album
  - Albertina Walker for Songs of the Church - Live in Memphis
- Best Contemporary Soul Gospel Album
  - Take 6 for Join the Band
- Best Southern Gospel, Country Gospel or Bluegrass Gospel Album
  - Alison Krauss & The Cox Family for I Know Who Holds Tomorrow
- Best Gospel Album by a Choir or Chorus
  - Milton Brunson (choir director) for Through God's Eyes performed by the Thompson Community Singers
  - Hezekiah Walker (choir director) for Live in Atlanta at Morehouse College performed by the Love Fellowship Crusade Choir

=== Historical ===
- Best Historical Album
  - Michael Lang (producer) for The Complete Ella Fitzgerald Song Books on Verve

=== Jazz ===
- Best Jazz Instrumental Solo
  - Benny Carter for "Prelude to a Kiss"
- Best Jazz Instrumental Performance, Individual or Group
  - Ron Carter, Herbie Hancock, Wallace Roney, Wayne Shorter & Tony Williams for A Tribute to Miles
- Best Large Jazz Ensemble Performance
  - McCoy Tyner for Journey
- Best Jazz Vocal Performance
  - Etta James for Mystery Lady: Songs of Billie Holiday
- Best Contemporary Jazz Performance
  - The Brecker Brothers for Out of the Loop
- Best Latin Jazz Performance
  - Arturo Sandoval for Danzón (Dance On)

=== Latin ===
- Best Latin Pop Performance
  - Luis Miguel for Segundo Romance
- Best Tropical Latin Performance
  - Cachao for Master Sessions Volume 1
- Best Mexican-American Performance
  - Vikki Carr for Recuerdo a Javier Solis

=== Musical show ===
- Best Musical Show Album
  - Phil Ramone (producer), Stephen Sondheim (composer & lyricist) & the original cast for Passion

=== Music video ===
- Best Music Video, Short Form
  - Ceán Chaffin (video producer), David Fincher (video director) & The Rolling Stones for "Love is Strong"
- Best Music Video, Long Form
  - Ned O'Hanlon, Rocky Oldham (video producers), David Mallet (video director) & U2 for Zoo TV: Live from Sydney

=== New Age ===
- Best New Age Album
  - Paul Winter for Prayer for the Wild Things

=== Packaging and notes ===
- Best Recording Package
  - Buddy Jackson (art director) for Tribute to the Music of Bob Wills & the Texas Playboys performed by Asleep at the Wheel
- Best Recording Package - Boxed
  - Chris Thompson (art director) for The Complete Ella Fitzgerald Songbooks performed by Ella Fitzgerald
- Best Album Notes
  - Dan Morgenstern & Loren Schoenberg (notes writers) for Louis Armstrong - Portrait of The Artist as a Young Man 1923-1934 performed by Louis Armstrong

=== Polka ===
- Best Polka Album
  - Walter Ostanek for Music and Friends performed by the Walter Ostanek Band

=== Pop ===
- Best Female Pop Vocal Performance
  - Sheryl Crow for "All I Wanna Do"
- Best Male Pop Vocal Performance
  - Elton John for "Can You Feel The Love Tonight"
- Best Pop Performance by a Duo or Group with Vocals
  - All-4-One for "I Swear"
- Best Pop Vocal Collaboration
  - Al Green & Lyle Lovett for "Funny How Time Slips Away"
- Best Pop Instrumental Performance
  - Booker T. & the M.G.'s for "Cruisin'"
- Best Pop Album
  - Bonnie Raitt for Longing in Their Hearts

=== Production and engineering ===
- Best Engineered Album, Non-Classical
  - Ed Cherney (engineer) for Longing in Their Hearts, performed by Bonnie Raitt
- Best Engineered Album, Classical
  - William Hoekstra (engineer) for Copland: Music For Films (The Red Pony, Our Town, Etc.)
- Producer of the Year
  - Don Was
- Classical Producer of the Year
  - Andrew Cornall

=== R&B ===
- Best Female R&B Vocal Performance
  - Toni Braxton for "Breathe Again"
- Best Male R&B Vocal Performance
  - Babyface for "When Can I See You"
- Best R&B Performance by a Duo or Group with Vocal
  - Boyz II Men for "I'll Make Love to You"
- Best Rhythm & Blues Song
  - Babyface (songwriter) for "I'll Make Love to You" performed by Boyz II Men
- Best R&B Album
  - Boyz II Men for II

=== Rap ===
Best Rap Solo Performance

- "U.N.I.T.Y." – Queen Latifah
- "Fantastic Voyage" – Coolio
- "Flava in Ya Ear" – Craig Mack
- "Gin and Juice" – Snoop Doggy Dogg
- "This D.J." – Warren G

Best Rap Performance by a Duo or Group

- "None of Your Business" – Salt-N-Pepa
- "Ease My Mind" – Arrested Development
- "I Ain't Goin' Out Like That" – Cypress Hill
- "Nuttin' But Love" – Heavy D & the Boyz
- "Regulate" – Warren G featuring Nate Dogg

=== Reggae ===
- Best Reggae Album
  - Bunny Wailer for Crucial! Roots Classics

=== Rock ===
- Best Female Rock Vocal Performance
  - Melissa Etheridge for "Come To My Window"
- Best Male Rock Vocal Performance
  - Bruce Springsteen for "Streets Of Philadelphia"
- Best Rock Performance by a Duo or Group with Vocal
  - Aerosmith for "Crazy"
- Best Rock Instrumental Performance
  - Pink Floyd for "Marooned"
- Best Hard Rock Performance
  - Soundgarden for "Black Hole Sun"
- Best Metal Performance
  - Soundgarden for "Spoonman"
- Best Rock Song
  - Bruce Springsteen for "Streets of Philadelphia"
- Best Rock Album
  - The Rolling Stones (artist) Don Was (producer) for Voodoo Lounge

=== Spoken Word ===
- Best Spoken Word or Non-Musical Album
  - Henry Rollins for Get In The Van - On The Road With Black Flag
- Best Spoken Comedy Album
  - Sam Kinison for Live From Hell

=== Traditional Pop ===
- Best Traditional Pop Vocal Performance
  - Tony Bennett for MTV Unplugged: Tony Bennett

=== World ===
- Best World Music Album
  - Ry Cooder & Ali Farka Touré for Talking Timbuktu

== Special merit awards ==
=== MusiCares Person of the Year ===
- Tony Bennett

== Television ratings ==
17.3 million viewers watched the 1995 Grammy Awards.
