= Tuesday Night Music Club =

Studio album by Sheryl Crow
- Released: August 3, 1993
- Studio: Toad Hall (Pasadena, California)
- Genres: Pop; rock
- Length: 49:42
- Label: A&M
- Producer: Bill Bottrell

Sheryl Crow chronology
Tuesday Night Music Club (1993)	Sheryl Crow (1996)

Singles from Tuesday Night Music Club
- 1. "Run Baby Run" Released: September 27, 1993; 2. "What I Can Do for You" Released: February 7, 1994; 3. "Leaving Las Vegas" Released: April 4, 1994; 4. "All I Wanna Do" Released: July 12, 1994; 5. "Strong Enough" Released: November 15, 1994; 6. "Can't Cry Anymore" Released: May 8, 1995

Tuesday Night Music Club is the debut studio album from American singer-songwriter Sheryl Crow, released on August 3, 1993. The first two singles from the album were not particularly successful. However, the album gained attention after the success of the fourth single, "All I Wanna Do", based on the Wyn Cooper poem "Fun" and co-written by David Baerwald, Bill Bottrell, Sheryl Crow, and Kevin Gilbert. The single eventually reached number two on the Billboard Hot 100, propelling the album to number three on the US Billboard 200 albums chart. It has sold more than 4.5 million copies in the US as of January 2008. On the UK Albums Chart, Tuesday Night Music Club reached number eight and is certified 2× platinum.

== History ==
The title of the album comes from the name for the ad hoc group of musicians that gathered at Bill Bottrell's Toad Hall Studios to write songs and play music. The group included Bill Bottrell, David Baerwald, David Daniels, Brian MacLeod and Kevin Gilbert, who brought his girlfriend singer Sheryl Crow to a few of the sessions. When Crow got signed she leveraged the output from these sessions and many of the players and composers of these songs appear on the album Tuesday Night Music Club album. Many of them share songwriting credits with Crow.

The front cover of the album shows Crow wearing a denim shirt with "a sheepish smile". The back cover has a neon cafe sign of the "Jenny Rose Cafe", consisting of the heart-shaped neon light behind the sign "CAFE" and above the other sign "JENNY ROSE".

The group existed as a casual songwriting collective prior to its association with Crow, but rapidly developed into a vehicle for her debut album after her arrival. At the time, she was dating Kevin Gilbert, who co-wrote most of the songs for this album with Crow, David Baerwald, David Ricketts, Bill Bottrell, Dan Schwartz and Brian MacLeod. Her relationship with Gilbert became acrimonious soon after the album's release, and there were disputes about songwriting credits. In interviews later, Crow claimed to have written them. Both Gilbert and Baerwald castigated Crow publicly in the fallout, although Baerwald later softened his position. A similar tension arose with Bottrell after her second album, on which he collaborated during the early stages.

In February 2008, Bottrell said, "The truth is hard to describe, but it lies between what all the people were shouting. It was all very vague and very complicated. She wrote the majority of the album. The guys and I contributed writing and lyrics, including some personal things. However, the sound was the sound that I developed". However, this was said while promoting their most current work together and contradicts most previous statements by him, including those in Richard Buskin's highly detailed book about the situation. Bottrell in earlier times had said Crow was given the second-largest portion of the publishing splits on the album to motivate her to work hard, as she still had to pay the very large debt from her unreleasable real first record, and publishing was the only way she was likely to earn any money from her new record.

Tuesday Night Music Club sold 7.6 million copies in the US and UK during the 1990s. The album also won Crow three Grammy Awards in 1995: Record of the Year, Best New Artist, and Best Female Pop Vocal Performance.

Travis Tritt's 2002 album Strong Enough features a song titled "Strong Enough to Be Your Man" and was written as a reply to Crow's original song.

Tuesday Night Music Club was expanded for a 2009 re-release. The 2009 deluxe edition features the original 1993 album, a second CD containing B-sides, rarities and outtakes and a bonus DVD featuring the album's six original videos plus a rare alternate version of "All I Wanna Do" directed by Roman Coppola. The DVD also includes a newly produced documentary composed of on-the-road, backstage, soundcheck and live footage from Crow's early 1990s tour in support of the set. Four of the previously unreleased recordings on the bonus CD—"Coffee Shop", "Killer Life", "Essential Trip of Hereness" and "You Want More"—were recorded in 1994 and intended for Crow's follow-up album. The cuts were mixed for this album by original Tuesday Night Music Club producer Bill Bottrell. The bonus CD also includes a trio of UK single B-sides—"Reach Around Jerk", an alternate version of "The Na-Na Song" titled "Volvo Cowgirl 99" and a cover of Eric Carmen's "All by Myself"—as well as a cover of Led Zeppelin's "D'yer Mak'er" and the song "On the Outside", which was released as part of an X-Files soundtrack album.

== Critical reception ==
Professional ratings
Review scores
Source	Rating
AllMusic	4/5 stars
Chicago Tribune	3/4 stars
Los Angeles Times	3/4 stars
The Philadelphia Inquirer	2.5/4 stars
Q	4/5 stars
Record Collector	4/5 stars
Rolling Stone	3.5/5 stars
The Rolling Stone Album Guide	3/5 stars
Uncut	3/5 stars
Vox	8/10

Reviewing the album for the Chicago Tribune, David Rothschild wrote that Tuesday Night Music Club "has a loosely-structured intimacy that perfectly compliments [sic] the straight-up, personal tone of Crow's rock 'n' roll story-telling and vocals." Vox's Patrick Humphries called it a "confident and assured" debut "bubbling over with heady music from all sources", while Q's Ian Cranna found the music "stylish, but not slick" and highlighted the mixture of "irony, imagination and observation" in Crow's "charged lyrics". Dennis Hunt of the Los Angeles Times commented that Crow "sings with the seductive quirkiness of Rickie Lee Jones", a comparison echoed by Jon Pareles in The New York Times, who added that Crow's best songs "are terse and well observed, and her voice makes even the lesser ones sound genuine."

In a retrospective appraisal, AllMusic critic Stephen Thomas Erlewine noted Tuesday Night Music Club's "loose, ramshackle charm" and concluded that "even with the weaker moments, Crow manages to create an identity for herself – a classic rocker at heart but with enough smarts to stay contemporary." Terry Staunton lauded it as "a stone cold 90s classic" in Record Collector, opining that despite the album being collaboratively written, "it's Crow's distinctive vocals ... that caught the ear and led to Grammy recognition." Tuesday Night Music Club was included in the book 1001 Albums You Must Hear Before You Die, and was ranked at number 94 on a 2017 list by NPR of the 150 greatest albums made by women.

== Track listing ==
Standard edition
No.	Title	Writer(s)	Length
1.	"Run Baby Run"	Bill Bottrell, David Baerwald, Sheryl Crow	4:53
2.	"Leaving Las Vegas"	Crow, Bottrell, Baerwald, Kevin Gilbert, David Ricketts	5:10
3.	"Strong Enough"	Crow, Bottrell, Baerwald, Gilbert, Ricketts, Brian MacLeod	3:10
4.	"Can't Cry Anymore"	Crow, Bottrell	3:41
5.	"Solidify"	Crow, Kevin Hunter, Bottrell, Baerwald, Gilbert, Ricketts, MacLeod	4:08
6.	"The Na-Na Song"	Crow, Bottrell, Baerwald, Gilbert, Ricketts, MacLeod	3:12
7.	"No One Said It Would Be Easy"	Crow, Bottrell, Gilbert, Dan Schwartz	5:29
8.	"What I Can Do for You"	Baerwald, Crow	4:15
9.	"All I Wanna Do"	Wyn Cooper, Crow, Bottrell, Baerwald, Gilbert	4:32
10.	"We Do What We Can"	Crow, Bottrell, Gilbert, Schwartz	5:38
11.	"I Shall Believe"	Crow, Bottrell	5:34

Brazilian release bonus track
No.	Title	Writer(s)	Length
12.	"All by Myself"	Eric Carmen	4:48

Recorded live on June 6, 1994, at the Shepherds Bush Empire by GLR/BBC.

1995 UK bonus disc Sheryl Crow Live
No.	Title	Writer(s)	Length
1.	"Reach Around Jerk"	Crow, Bottrell, Schwartz	4:48
2.	"Can't Cry Anymore"	Crow, Bottrell	4:54
3.	"What I Can Do for You"	Crow, Baerwald	7:01
4.	"No One Said It Would Be Easy"	Crow, Bottrell, Gilbert, Schwartz	6:55
5.	"Leaving Las Vegas"	Crow, Bottrell, Baerwald, Gilbert, Ricketts	6:38
6.	"Volvo Cowgirl"	Crow, Baerwald, Gilbert, Bottrell, MacLeod, Schwartz	2:30

Recorded live on April 15, 1994, at the 328 Club.

1995 Australian bonus disc and Japanese bonus disc Live from Nashville
No.	Title	Writer(s)	Length
1.	"Can't Cry Anymore"	Crow, Bottrell	4:24
2.	"Reach Around Jerk"	Crow, Bottrell, Schwartz	4:10
3.	"Strong Enough"	Crow, Bottrell, Baerwald, Gilbert, MacLeod, Ricketts	3:11
4.	"Leaving Las Vegas"	Crow, Bottrell, Baerwald, Gilbert, Ricketts	5:48
5.	"I Shall Believe"	Crow, Bottrell	6:21

Recorded live on May 1, 1995.

1995 Singaporean bonus disc and Taiwan bonus disc Live in Singapore
No.	Title	Writer(s)	Length
1.	"Can't Cry Anymore"	Crow, Bottrell	4:24
2.	"Leaving Las Vegas"	Crow, Bottrell, Baerwald, Gilbert, Ricketts	5:34
3.	"Run Baby Run"	Crow, Bottrell, Baerwald	5:58
4.	"The Na-Na Song"	Crow, Bottrell, Baerwald, Gilbert, Ricketts, MacLeod	3:42
5.	"Strong Enough"	Crow, Bottrell, Baerwald, Gilbert, MacLeod, Ricketts	3:12
6.	"All I Wanna Do"	Crow, Cooper, Bottrell, Baerwald, Gilbert	5:19

1995 Spanish bonus disc and Portuguese bonus disc Live From Los 40 Principales, Madrid
No.	Title	Length
1.	"Although listed as May 5, 1995, source/tracks are the same as the 1995 Singaporean bonus disc"

=== Deluxe edition re-release ===
Disc 2: B-sides, rarities and outtakes

1. "Coffee Shop" (Crow, Bottrell) (Previously unreleased) (4:24)
2. "Killer Life" (Crow, Bottrell) (Previously unreleased) (4:57)
3. "Essential Trip of Hereness" (Crow, MacLeod, Jennifer Condos, Scott Bryan, Bottrell) (Previously unreleased) (5:30)
4. "Reach Around Jerk" (Crow, Bottrell, Schwartz) (From one of the B-sides of UK single "Run Baby Run", 1993) (4:01)
5. "Volvo Cowgirl 99" (Crow, Baerwald, Gilbert, Bottrell, MacLeod, Schwartz) (From the B-side of the UK single "What I Can Do for You", 1994) (2:04)
6. "You Want More" (Crow, Trott) (Previously unreleased) (6:00)
7. "All by Myself" (Carmen, Rachmaninoff) (From one of the B-sides of UK single "Run Baby Run", 1993) (4:48)
8. "On the Outside" (Crow, Bottrell) (From Songs in the Key of X: Music from and Inspired by the X-Files and the B-side of the UK CD single, "If It Makes You Happy", 1996) (4:37)
9. "D'yer Mak'er" (Jimmy Page, Robert Plant, John Paul Jones, John Bonham) (From Encomium: A Tribute to Led Zeppelin and the B-side of the UK CD single "What I Can Do for You", 1995) (4:20)
10. "I Shall Believe" (Crow, Bottrell) (New 2009 remix) (4:35)

Disc 3: Bonus DVD

1. "Valuable Stuff": A documentary featuring on-the-road, backstage, soundcheck and live footage recorded during the Tuesday Night Music Club Tour, 1994–1995
2. "Leaving Las Vegas" (Crow, Bottrell, Baerwald, Gilbert, Ricketts)
3. "All I Wanna Do" (Cooper, Crow, Bottrell, Baerwald, Gilbert)
4. "Strong Enough" (Crow, Bottrell, Baerwald, Gilbert, MacLeod, Ricketts)
5. "Can't Cry Anymore" (Crow, Bottrell)
6. "Run Baby Run" (Bottrell, Baerwald, Crow)
7. "What I Can Do for You" (Baerwald, Crow)

Bonus video

1. "All I Wanna Do" (Cooper, Crow, Bottrell, Baerwald, Gilbert) (Alternate version)

=== B-sides ===
Title	Release
"All by Myself"	1993
"Reach Around Jerk"	1993
"Volvo Cowgirl 99"	1994
"I'm Gonna Be a Wheel Someday"	1994
"D'yer Mak'er"	1995
"On the Outside"	1996
"Coffee Shop"	2009
"Killer Life"	2009
"Essential Trip of Hereness"	2009
"You Want More"	2009

== Personnel ==
- Sheryl Crow – guitar, piano, vocals
- David Baerwald – guitar
- Bill Bottrell – guitar, pedal steel
- Kevin Gilbert – keys, guitar, drums ("Run Baby Run", "All by Myself"), bass ("All I Wanna Do")
- David Ricketts – bass guitar ("Leaving Las Vegas")
- Dan Schwartz – bass, guitar
- Brian MacLeod – drums

Technical

- Bill Bottrell – producer
- Dan Schwartz – assistant producer
- Blair Lamb – engineer
- Bernie Grundman – mastering
- Richard Frankel – art direction
- Jean Krikorian – design
- Melodie McDaniel, Peggy Sirota, Scott Henriksen – photography
- Sheryl Crow – liner notes

== Charts ==
=== Weekly charts ===
Weekly chart performance for Tuesday Night Music Club
Chart (1994–95)	Peak position
Australian Albums (ARIA)	1
Austrian Albums (Ö3 Austria)	3
Belgian Albums (Ultratop Flanders)	17
Belgian Albums (Ultratop Wallonia)	36
Canada Top Albums/CDs (RPM)	5
Dutch Albums (Album Top 100)	17
European Top 100 Albums (Billboard)	14
French Albums (SNEP)	8
German Albums (Offizielle Top 100)	9
Japanese Albums (Oricon)	54
New Zealand Albums (RMNZ)	4
Norwegian Albums (VG-lista)	24
Scottish Albums (Official Charts)	12
Swedish Albums (Sverigetopplistan)	41
Swiss Albums (Schweizer Hitparade)	6
UK Albums (Official Charts)	8
US Billboard 200	3

=== Year-end charts ===
1994 year-end chart performance for Tuesday Night Music Club
Chart (1994)	Position
Canada Top Albums/CDs (RPM)	42
US Billboard 200	60

1995 year-end chart performance for Tuesday Night Music Club
Chart (1995)	Position
Australian Albums (ARIA)	14
Austrian Albums (Ö3 Austria)	29
Belgian Albums (Ultratop Flanders)	47
Canada Top Albums/CDs (RPM)	23
Dutch Albums (Album Top 100)	67
European Top 100 Albums (Billboard)	25
French Albums (SNEP)	88
German Albums (Offizielle Top 100)	32
New Zealand Albums (RMNZ)	21
Swiss Albums (Schweizer Hitparade)	15
UK Albums (OCC)	65
US Billboard 200	15

=== Decade-end charts ===
1990s-end chart performance for Tuesday Night Music Club
Chart (1990–99)	Position
US Billboard 200	98

== Certifications and sales ==
Sales certifications for Tuesday Night Music Club
Region	Certification	Certified units/sales
Australia (ARIA)	5× Platinum	350,000^{‡}
Austria (IFPI Austria)	Gold	25,000^{*}
Brazil (Pro-Música Brasil)	2× Gold	200,000^{*}
Canada (Music Canada)	3× Platinum	300,000^{^}
France (SNEP)	Gold	100,000^{*}
Germany (BVMI)	Gold	250,000^{^}
Japan (RIAJ)	Gold	160,000
Netherlands (NVPI)	Gold	50,000^{^}
New Zealand (RMNZ)	6× Platinum	90,000^{^}
Spain (Promusicae)	Gold	50,000^{^}
Switzerland (IFPI Switzerland)	Platinum	50,000^{^}
United Kingdom (BPI)	2× Platinum	600,000^{^}
United States (RIAA)	7× Platinum	7,000,000^{^}
Summaries
Europe	—	5,000,000
^{*} Sales figures based on certification alone.^{^} Shipments figures based on certification alone.^{‡} Sales+streaming figures based on certification alone.

== Awards ==
Grammy Awards

Year	Nominee / work	Award	Result
1995
1995	"All I Wanna Do"	Best Female Pop Vocal Performance	Won
1995	"All I Wanna Do"	Record of the Year	Won
1995	"All I Wanna Do"	Song of the Year	Nominated
1995	Sheryl Crow	Best New Artist	Won
