= If It Makes You Happy =

1996 single by Sheryl Crow

Single by Sheryl Crow

from the album Sheryl Crow
- B-side: "I'm Going to Be a Wheel Someday"
- Released: August 27, 1996
- Studio: Kingsway (New Orleans); Sunset Sound Factory (Los Angeles)
- Genre: Rock; country rock
- Length: 5:23 (album version); 4:30 (radio edit)
- Label: A&M
- Songwriters: Sheryl Crow; Jeff Trott
- Producer: Sheryl Crow

Sheryl Crow singles chronology
"Can't Cry Anymore" (1995)	"If It Makes You Happy" (1996)	"Everyday Is a Winding Road" (1996)

Audio sample
- file; help

Music video
- "If It Makes You Happy" on YouTube

"If It Makes You Happy" is a song by American singer-songwriter Sheryl Crow, released by A&M Records as the lead single from her 1996 eponymous album in August 1996. The song is written by Crow with Jeff Trott and she produced it. It peaked at number ten on the US Billboard Hot 100, becoming Crow's final top-10 solo hit in the United States, and at number nine on the UK Singles Chart. The song also reached number one in Canada and won Best Female Rock Vocal Performance at the 1997 Grammy Awards. Keir McFarlane directed the accompanying music videos. In 2003, Q Magazine ranked "If It Makes You Happy" at number 663 in their list of the "1001 Best Songs Ever".

== Critical reception ==
"If It Makes You Happy" received positive reviews from music critics. Scottish Aberdeen Press and Journal stated that Sheryl Crow "continues to stay near the top of the premier league of slightly off the-wall female solo singers with what seems a near-certain Top 10 hit." Swedish Aftonbladet described the song as "shuffling trad-rock". Stephen Thomas Erlewine from AllMusic called it "weary" and "sexily exhausted". Larry Flick from Billboard magazine stated that it is a "straight-ahead rocker that has far more bite than anything on her Grammy-lavished debut." He added that "seemingly endless touring has given her voice a sharp rasp, which benefits the song's ironic lyrics and holds up strong against the track's crunchy guitars." He also noted the track's "edgy nature" and "subtle but unmistakable hook."

Daina Darzin from Cash Box viewed it as "an appropriately plain, anthemic song with the universally-appealing hook, "if it makes you happy, it can't be that bad", adding, "Fans who usually shop Wal-Mart will be looking for a new record store with this one, so retailers should stock lots and lots." The Daily Vault's Sean McCarthy remarked that here, a "dirty guitar riff is established, complimenting Crow's gritty swagger." Another Swedish newspaper, Göteborgs-Tidningen called it "darkly moody", picking it as one of two favourites from the album. Rachel Cohen from The Heights felt "the familiar more expressive Crow of the first album is evident" on the song, declaring it as "one of the most peppy" on the Sheryl Crow album. A reviewer from Music Week rated it five out of five and named it Single of the Week, noting that it "captures the raunchy rawk'n'roll feel of Crow's live sets. Though some may miss the fragility of her debut, this is good enough to shift bucketloads and is already winning airplay." People magazine described the song as "country-tinged". David Fricke from Rolling Stone said that "If It Makes You Happy" "is as good as it gets, juicing the feel of Tuesday Night with a little Friday night fire."

In 2017, Billboard ranked the song number 10 on their list of the 10 greatest Sheryl Crow songs, and in 2023, The Guardian ranked the song number four on their list of the 20 greatest Sheryl Crow songs.

== Chart performance ==
The song entered the US Billboard Hot 100 at number 44 on the week of September 21, 1996. It entered the top 20 on October 19, 1996, and fluctuated within the top 20 for roughly three months before reaching its peak of number 10 on January 25, 1997. The song spent a total of 27 weeks on the Hot 100. In Canada, on September 2, 1996, "If It Makes You Happy" debuted at number 78 on the RPM 100 Hit Tracks chart. Ten issues later, on November 11, it topped the chart for a single week. It also reached number one on RPM's Adult Contemporary and Alternative 30 listings.

In Europe, the single debuted and peaked at number nine on the UK Singles Chart, becoming Crow's second top-ten single in the United Kingdom. The British Phonographic Industry certified the song silver in January 2021 for sales and streaming figures of over 200,000. It reached the top 40 in France, Iceland, and Sweden, reaching numbers 29, 17, and 20, respectively, and also charted in Flanders, Germany, and Switzerland. On the Eurochart Hot 100, "If It Makes You Happy" settled at a peak of number 56. It additionally reached the top 20 in Australia, rising to number 20 on November 17, 1996, and in New Zealand, where it peaked at number 12 one week later.

== Music videos ==
Two different music videos for the song were made, both were directed by Keir McFarlane. The first was shot entirely in black-and-white. It begins with Crow in an apartment, donning a black raincoat. She then walks down a city street, rides a subway, is shown on a boardwalk, buys coffee at a mall, and then returns to the apartment. The second video was shot in color and features Crow in the Endangered Species section of the Natural History Museum of Los Angeles County. She is dressed in a leopard-print fur coat and Yves Saint Laurent leather boots.

== Impact and legacy ==
"If It Makes You Happy" became a standard of the self-titled album, and the song's sound, slow-tempo but constantly-tense and grinding, the definer for Crow. In later decades, Q Magazine placed "If It Makes You Happy" at number 663 in their list of the "1001 Best Songs Ever" in 2003. Slant Magazine listed it at number 92 in their ranking of "The 100 Best Singles of the 1990s" in 2011. Publications such as Billboard and The Guardian have ranked "If It Makes You Happy" among Crow's best songs.

== Track listings ==
- US CD and cassette single
1. "If It Makes You Happy" (edit)
2. "Keep On Growing"
- US maxi-CD single
1. "If It Makes You Happy" (LP version) – 5:23
2. "Keep On Growing" – 5:24
3. "I'm Going to Be a Wheel Someday" – 3:38
4. "No One Said It Would Be Easy" (Live in Nashville) – 5:37
- US 7-inch single

A. "If It Makes You Happy" (edit) – 4:30
B. "I'm Going to Be a Wheel Someday" – 3:38

- UK CD1 and cassette single
1. "If It Makes You Happy" (edit)
2. "All I Wanna Do"
3. "Run Baby Run"
4. "Leaving Las Vegas"
- UK CD2
1. "If It Makes You Happy" – 4:30
2. "On the Outside" – 4:42
3. "Keep On Growing" – 5:24
4. "The Book" – 4:34

Note: The Australian and Japanese CD singles switch tracks two and three.

== Credits and personnel ==
Credits are lifted from the UK CD1 liner notes and the Sheryl Crow album booklet.

Studios

- Recorded at Kingsway Studios (New Orleans) and Sunset Sound Factory (Los Angeles)
- Mastered at Gateway Mastering (Portland, Maine, US)

Personnel

- Sheryl Crow – writing, keyboard, production
- Jeff Trott – writing, guitars
- Dan Rothchild – bass
- Michael Urbano – drums
- Trina Shoemaker – recording
- Tchad Blake – mixing
- Bob Ludwig – mastering

== Charts ==
=== Weekly charts ===
Chart (1996–1997)	Peak position
Australia (ARIA)	20
Belgium (Ultratip Bubbling Under Flanders)	5
Canada Top Singles (RPM)	1
Canada Adult Contemporary (RPM)	1
Canada Rock/Alternative (RPM)	1
Europe (Eurochart Hot 100)	56
Europe (European Hit Radio)	7
France (SNEP)	29
Germany (GfK)	80
Iceland (Íslenski Listinn Topp 40)	17
Israel (Israeli Singles Chart)	3
Italy Airplay (Music & Media)	8
Netherlands (Dutch Top 40 Tipparade)	19
Netherlands (Single Top 100 Tipparade)	6
New Zealand (Recorded Music NZ)	12
Quebec (ADISQ)	3
Scottish Singles Sales (Official Charts)	6
Sweden (Sverigetopplistan)	20
Switzerland (Schweizer Hitparade)	39
UK Singles (Official Charts)	9
US Billboard Hot 100	10
US Adult Alternative Airplay (Billboard)	1
US Adult Pop Airplay (Billboard)	5
US Alternative Airplay (Billboard)	6
US Mainstream Rock (Billboard)	37
US Pop Airplay (Billboard)	4

=== Year-end charts ===
Chart (1996)	Position
Canada Adult Contemporary (RPM)	73
Canada Rock/Alternative (RPM)	14
US Billboard Hot 100	75
US Modern Rock Tracks (Billboard)	52
US Top 40/Mainstream (Billboard)	62
US Triple-A (Billboard)	8

Chart (1997)	Position
Canada Adult Contemporary (RPM)	42
US Billboard Hot 100	55
US Adult Top 40 (Billboard)	27
US Top 40/Mainstream (Billboard)	39

=== Decade-end charts ===
Chart (1990–1999)	Position
Canada (Nielsen SoundScan)	60

== Certifications ==
Region	Certification	Certified units/sales
Australia (ARIA)	Platinum	70,000^{‡}
New Zealand (RMNZ)	Gold	15,000^{‡}
United Kingdom (BPI)	Silver	200,000^{‡}
United States (RIAA)	Platinum	1,000,000^{‡}
^{‡} Sales+streaming figures based on certification alone.

== Release history ==
Region	Date	Format(s)	Label(s)	Ref(s).
United States	August 27, 1996	Contemporary hit radio	A&M	
United States	September 3, 1996	CD; cassette	A&M	
United Kingdom	September 9, 1996	CD; cassette	A&M	
Japan	September 23, 1996	CD	A&M	

== See also ==
- List of RPM number-one singles of 1996 (Canada)
- List of RPM Rock/Alternative number-one singles (Canada)
