= What I Can Do for You =

1994 single by Sheryl Crow

- 1995 UK re-release, CD1

Single by Sheryl Crow

from the album Tuesday Night Music Club
- B-side: "Volvo Cowgirl 99"; "I Shall Believe"; "D'yer Mak'er"; "I'm Gonna Be a Wheel Someday"; "No One Said It Would Be Easy"
- Released: February 7, 1994
- Studio: Toad Hall (Pasadena, California)
- Genre: Rock
- Length: 4:15
- Label: A&M
- Songwriter(s): David Baerwald; Sheryl Crow
- Producer(s): Bill Bottrell

Sheryl Crow singles chronology
"Run Baby Run" (1993)	"What I Can Do for You" (1994)	"Leaving Las Vegas" (1994)

Music video
- "Sheryl Crow - What I Can Do For You" on YouTube

"What I Can Do for You" is a song by American singer-songwriter Sheryl Crow from her debut studio album, Tuesday Night Music Club (1993), released on A&M Records. It was originally issued in February 1994, and the single includes a faster version of LP track "The Na-Na Song" under the name "Volvo Cowgirl 99". In the United Kingdom, the song reached number 84 in its first release in 1994, then number 43 following a re-release in late 1995. The song deals with sexual harassment, which Crow says she experienced during her rise to fame.

The 1995 UK release sparked an industry controversy when the Official Charts Company initially refused to allow the single to chart due to the free calendar in the packaging, which broke a chart rule about free gifts. After it was pointed out that the chart compilers had allowed Madonna's "You'll See" to chart (which also contained a free calendar, albeit configured differently within the single packaging as postcards, rather than ring-bound), the decision was reversed just before the week's chart was issued.

== Critical reception ==
Pan-European magazine Music & Media wrote, "By absorbing so much music, bits out of pop classics have nonchalantly slipped into Crow's work. This groovy tune is like the Pretenders' 'Don't Get Me Wrong' on a Sly Stone bassline."

== Track listings ==
- Original UK CD single (Cat. No. 580 463-2) (1994)
1. "What I Can Do for You" (radio edit)
2. "What I Can Do for You" (LP version)
3. "Volvo Cowgirl 99"
4. "I Shall Believe"
- Re-released UK CD single 1 (Cat. No. 581 221-2) (1995)
1. "What I Can Do for You" (UK edit)
2. "D'yer Mak'er"
3. "I'm Gonna Be a Wheel Someday"
4. "No One Said It Would Be Easy"
- Re-released UK CD single 2 (Cat. No. 581 229-2) (1995)
1. "What I Can Do for You" (live in Madrid)
2. "All I Wanna Do" (live in Madrid)
3. "Strong Enough" (live in Madrid)
4. "Can't Cry Anymore" (live in Madrid)

== Charts ==
Chart (1994)	Peak position
UK Singles (OCC)	84

Chart (1995)	Peak position
Scotland (OCC)	36
UK Singles (OCC)	43

== Release history ==
Region	Date	Format(s)	Label(s)	Ref.
United Kingdom	February 7, 1994	7-inch vinyl; CD; cassette	A&M	
United Kingdom (re-release)	1995	CD; cassette	A&M	
