= Can't Cry Anymore =

1995 single by Sheryl Crow

- US 7-inch and CD single cover art

Single by Sheryl Crow

from the album Tuesday Night Music Club
- B-side: "We Do What We Can"
- Released: May 8, 1995
- Studio: Toad Hall (Pasadena, California)
- Length: 4:31
- Label: A&M
- Songwriters: Sheryl Crow; Bill Bottrell
- Producer: Bill Bottrell

Sheryl Crow singles chronology
"Strong Enough" (1994)	"Can't Cry Anymore" (1995)	"If It Makes You Happy" (1996)

Music video
- "Sheryl Crow - Can't Cry Anymore (Official Music Video)" on YouTube

"Can't Cry Anymore" is a song by American singer-songwriter Sheryl Crow from her debut album, Tuesday Night Music Club (1993), released through A&M Records. Released in May 1995, the song reached number 36 on the US Billboard Hot 100, becoming Crow's third top-40 hit. In Canada, the song reached number three to become Crow's third consecutive top-three hit, following the number-one singles "All I Wanna Do" and "Strong Enough". Elsewhere, the song had limited success, reaching number 33 in the United Kingdom and number 41 in Australia.

== Critical reception ==
Steve Baltin from Cash Box wrote, "Her remarkable streak should continue with this uptempo pop flavored tune. Slightly less rock oriented than 'Leaving Las Vegas', her first single, this one seems to be a perfect fit for top 40, as well as CHR Modern Rock is a question mark, but top ten status for this kind of summer fun seems inevitable." Greg Kot of the Chicago Tribune said the song showed similarities to the Rolling Stones song "Honky Tonk Woman".

== Track listings ==
- US 7-inch and cassette single
- Japanese mini-CD single
1. "Can't Cry Anymore" (LP version) – 3:41
2. "We Do What We Can" (LP version) – 5:38
- US and Australian CD single
1. "Can't Cry Anymore" (LP version) – 3:41
2. "No One Said It Would Be Easy" (live at the Empire, June 6, 1994) – 6:52
3. "What I Can Do for You" (live at the Empire, June 6, 1994) – 7:17
4. "I Shall Believe" (live at the Empire, June 6, 1994) – 7:31
- European CD single
1. "Can't Cry Anymore" – 3:41
2. "I Shall Believe" (live at the Empire, June 6, 1994)
- UK CD1 and cassette single
1. "Can't Cry Anymore"
2. "All I Wanna Do" (remix)
3. "Strong Enough" (US radio version)
4. "We Do What We Can"
- UK CD2
1. "Can't Cry Anymore"
2. "What I Can Do for You" (live at the Borderline)
3. "No One Said It Would Be Easy" (live in Nashville)
4. "I Shall Believe" (live at the Empire, June 6, 1994)

== Charts ==
=== Weekly charts ===
Chart (1994)	Peak position
Australia (ARIA)	41
Canada Top Singles (RPM)	3
Canada Adult Contemporary (RPM)	13
Europe (European Hit Radio)	27
Quebec (ADISQ)	7
Scottish Singles Sales (Official Charts)	27
UK Singles (Official Charts)	33
US Billboard Hot 100	36
US Adult Contemporary (Billboard)	22
US Adult Pop Airplay (Billboard)	29
US Alternative Airplay (Billboard)	38
US Pop Airplay (Billboard)	10

=== Year-end charts ===
Chart (1995)	Position
Canada Top Singles (RPM)	15

== Release history ==
Region	Date	Format(s)	Label(s)	Ref.
United Kingdom	May 8, 1995	CD; cassette	A&M	
United States	June 26, 1995	Alternative radio	A&M	
United States	June 27, 1995	Contemporary hit radio	A&M	
Japan	July 1, 1995	Mini-CD	A&M	
Australia	July 17, 1996	CD; cassette	A&M	
