= Strong Enough (Sheryl Crow song) =

1994 single by Sheryl Crow

- U.S. CD single cover art

Single by Sheryl Crow

from the album Tuesday Night Music Club
- B-side: "All I Wanna Do" (live); "Reach Around Jerk" (live); "Leaving Las Vegas" (live); "Run Baby Run"; "What I Can Do for You"
- Released: November 15, 1994
- Studio: Toad Hall (Pasadena, California)
- Genre: Folk
- Length: 3:10
- Label: A&M
- Songwriters: Sheryl Crow; Bill Bottrell; Kevin Gilbert; Brian MacLeod; David Ricketts; David Baerwald
- Producer: Bill Bottrell

Sheryl Crow singles chronology
"All I Wanna Do" (1994)	"Strong Enough" (1994)	"Can't Cry Anymore" (1995)

Audio sample
- file; help

Music video
- "Sheryl Crow - Strong Enough (Official Music Video)" on YouTube

"Strong Enough" is a song by American singer-songwriter Sheryl Crow from her debut album, Tuesday Night Music Club (1993). It was co-written by Crow and produced by Bill Bottrell, who also co-wrote it. The single was released in November 1994 by A&M Records, reaching number five on the US Billboard Hot 100, number three in Australia, and number one in Canada. In Australia, the song received a double-platinum certification for sales and streams exceeding 140,000 units. Its music video was directed by Martin Bell, and filmed in black-and-white, depicting Crow alone in a large and empty room.

Crow performed the song on her live album Sheryl Crow and Friends: Live from Central Park alongside the Dixie Chicks. The song was later included on Crow's greatest hits album, The Very Best of Sheryl Crow.

== Background and composition ==
"Strong Enough" is an acoustic folk-pop song. In live performances, Crow often plays the accordion to it, although this instrument was not featured on the original recording. The song is written in the key of D major and follows a chord progression of D–G5–Bm♭6–A, with Crow's vocals spanning from A_{3} to B_{4}. The lyrics question the strength of a romantic partner's commitment and express the difficulty of being loved despite one's imperfections.

== Critical reception ==
Steve Baltin from Cash Box wrote, "On the heels of her good-time up-tempo number 'All I Wanna Do', Crow comes back with a ballad, which was co-written by David Baerwald, formerly of David & David, along with five other people. And yet, even with all those helping hands, the song is a very straight-forward love song. Simple in arrangement though somewhat lush in melody, the real point is to showcase Crow’s vocal talents—which she has. Though the song may not be as big a hit as her first two singles, it sets Crow up for the long haul and is likely to be an adult/contemporary monster."

Alan Jones from Music Week described 'Strong Enough' as "another pleasing, though less commercial [than 'All I Wanna Do'], song – a lilting, understated folksy piece. Not a huge single, but it will direct further attention to her album, Tuesday Night Music Club." Music & Media also described the track as 'folky', stating that the Tuesday Night Music Club CD is "a bottomless pit of beauties." Emma Cochrane from Smash Hits gave 'Strong Enough' two out of five, naming it "a gentle, acoustic number from Miss Crow to follow up her surprisingly huge hit, 'All I Wanna Do'. This is a pleasant ditty, sung from the heart, but it's hardly a stand-out single."

== Music video ==
A simple black-and-white music video for "Strong Enough" was directed by Martin Bell. It features Crow in a largely empty room alternatively singing the song into a microphone and pacing anxiously through the room.

== Track listings ==
- US and Australian CD single
1. "Strong Enough" (LP version) – 3:10
2. "All I Wanna Do" (live) – 4:12
3. "Reach Around Jerk" (live) – 4:22
4. "Leaving Las Vegas" (live) – 5:29
- US 7-inch single

A. "Strong Enough" – 3:10
B. "Run Baby Run" – 4:53

- US cassette single
1. "Strong Enough"
2. "What I Can Do for You"
- UK 7-inch single

A. "Strong Enough"
B. "No One Said It Would Be Easy"

- UK CD1
1. "Strong Enough"
2. "All by Myself"
3. "Strong Enough" (live at the Borderline)
4. "Reach Around Jerk"
- UK CD2
1. "Strong Enough"
2. "No One Said It Would Be Easy"
3. "All I Wanna Do" (live in Nashville)
- European CD single
- Australian cassette single
- Japanese mini-CD single
1. "Strong Enough" (LP version) – 3:10
2. "Leaving Las Vegas" (live) – 5:29

== Charts ==
=== Weekly charts ===
Chart (1995)	Peak position
Australia (ARIA)	3
Canada Top Singles (RPM)	1
Canada Adult Contemporary (RPM)	3
Europe (Eurochart Hot 100)	78
Europe (European Hit Radio)	22
Germany (GfK)	69
Iceland (Íslenski Listinn Topp 40)	9
Israel (Israeli Singles Chart)	13
Netherlands (Dutch Top 40 Tipparade)	19
Netherlands (Single Top 100 Tipparade)	7
New Zealand (Recorded Music NZ)	42
Quebec (ADISQ)	2
Scottish Singles Sales (Official Charts)	27
UK Singles (Official Charts)	33
US Billboard Hot 100	5
US Adult Contemporary (Billboard)	11
US Adult Pop Airplay (Billboard)	34
US Alternative Airplay (Billboard)	10
US Pop Airplay (Billboard)	3
US Cash Box Top 100	4

=== Year-end charts ===
Chart (1995)	Position
Australia (ARIA)	26
Brazil (Crowley)	78
Canada Top Singles (RPM)	8
Canada Adult Contemporary (RPM)	31
Iceland (Íslenski Listinn Topp 40)	73
US Billboard Hot 100	30
US Adult Contemporary (Billboard)	40
US Top 40/Mainstream (Billboard)	18
US Cash Box Top 100	24

== Certifications ==
Region	Certification	Certified units/sales
Australia (ARIA)	2× Platinum	140,000^{‡}
New Zealand (RMNZ)	Gold	15,000^{‡}
United States (RIAA)	Gold	500,000^{‡}
^{‡} Sales+streaming figures based on certification alone.

== Release history ==
Region	Date	Format(s)	Label(s)	Ref.
United States	November 15, 1994	7-inch vinyl; CD; cassette	A&M	
Japan	January 25, 1995	Mini-CD	A&M	
United Kingdom	January 30, 1995	7-inch vinyl; CD; cassette	A&M	
Australia	March 3, 1995	CD; cassette	A&M; Polydor	

== Covers and interpolations ==
Travis Tritt wrote and released an answer song called "Strong Enough to Be Your Man" in 2002. Haim covered the song for Triple J's Like a Version segment in 2103, with the video uploaded to Triple J's channel in April 2020. Haim covered the song with singer-songwriter Lorde later in 2013 for VH1's You Oughta Know concert series.
