= Wyn Cooper =

American poet

Wyn Cooper (born January 2, 1957) is an American poet. He is best known for his 1987 poem "Fun", which was adapted by Sheryl Crow and Bill Bottrell into the lyrics of Crow's 1994 breakthrough single "All I Wanna Do".

== Early life ==
Cooper was born in Detroit, Michigan, to Maree Edith Cooper, a teacher's aide, and William Wendell Cooper, a tool-and-die machinist. Cooper was raised in Michigan and attended the University of Utah (B.A., 1979), Hollins College (M.A., 1981), and later, the creative writing doctoral program at University of Utah.

== Career ==
He has taught at the University of Utah, Bennington College, Marlboro College, and at The Frost Place Festival of Poetry.

Cooper has served as editor of Quarterly West and recently worked for the Harriet Monroe Poetry Institute, a think tank run by the Poetry Foundation. He currently works as a freelance editor of poetry, fiction, non-fiction, and memoir.

== Books ==
His novel Way Out West was released in 2022. His other books are The Unraveling (White Pine Press, 2026), Mars Poetica (White Pine Press, 2018), Chaos is the New Calm (BOA Editions, 2010), Postcards from the Interior (BOA Editions, 2005), The Way Back (White Pine Press, 2000), and The Country of Here Below (Ahsahta Press, 1987).

== Poems ==
Cooper's poems, stories, essays, and reviews have appeared in Slate Magazine, Poetry, Orion, Gander Press Review, Blackbird, AGNI, Crazyhorse, and Ploughshares and are included in 25 anthologies of contemporary poetry.

== Songs ==
One of his poems, Fun, was used for the lyrics of the Sheryl Crow song, "All I Wanna Do".

"But in January 1993, Bill Bottrell and Kevin Gilbert, Sheryl Crow's producer and keyboard player, took a break from recording her first CD, Tuesday Night Music Club, for want of better lyrics to a tune they already had in mind. They went around the corner to Cliff's Books in Pasadena, where they found a used copy of my book." — Wyn Cooper

Crow's producer Bill Bottrell discovered Cooper's poetry book The Country of Here Below in Cliff's Books, a Pasadena, California, used bookstore. Bottrell adapted Fun into the lyrics for her song when Crow could not come up with usable lyrics, earning Cooper considerable royalties, and helping to publicise his book, originally published in a run of only 500 copies in 1987, into multiple reprints.

In 2002, Cooper's lyrics for a fictional band appeared in ex-college friend Madison Smartt Bell's novel, Anything Goes. In 2003, the songs were put to music by Bell, recorded and produced by bassist Don Dixon, with Mitch Easter, and percussionist Jim Brock and released as Madison Smartt Bell and Wyn Cooper: 40 Words for Fear. The second CD, with percussionist Jim Brock and bassist/producer Don Dixon, from Bell & Cooper:Postcards Out of the Blue, was based in part on Cooper's book Postcards from the Interior, a suggestion by Dixon. Their songs have been used on five television shows.

Cooper has also written and recorded songs with David Broza, David Baerwald, and Jody Redhage.

== Works ==
- The Country of Here Below (Ahsahta Press, 1987)
- The Way Back (White Pine Press, 2000)
- Postcards from the Interior (BOA Editions, Ltd., 2005)
- Chaos is the New Calm (BOA Editions, 2010)
- Mars Poetica (White Pine Press, 2018)

== Personal life ==
Cooper resides in Vermont and works as a freelance editor.
