= D'yer Mak'er =

- German single picture sleeve

Single by Led Zeppelin

from the album Houses of the Holy
- B-side: "The Crunge"
- Released: 17 September 1973 (US)
- Recorded: April 1972
- Studio: Stargroves (East Woodhay)
- Genre: Reggae rock
- Length: 4:19
- Label: Atlantic
- Songwriters: John Bonham; John Paul Jones; Jimmy Page; Robert Plant
- Producer: Jimmy Page

Led Zeppelin singles chronology
"Over the Hills and Far Away" (1973)	"D'yer Mak'er" (1973)	"Trampled Under Foot" (1975)

Audio sample
- file; help

"D'yer Mak'er" (/dʒəˈmeɪkə/ "Jamaica") is a song by the English rock band Led Zeppelin, from their 1973 album Houses of the Holy. The title is a play on the words "did you make her?" being pronounced as "Jamaica" when spoken in an English accent.

== Overview ==
This song was meant to imitate reggae and its "dub" derivative emerging from Jamaica in the early 1970s. Its genesis is traced to Led Zeppelin's rehearsals at Stargroves in 1972, when drummer John Bonham started with a beat similar to 1950s doo-wop, and then twisted it into a slight off beat tempo, upon which a reggae influence emerged. The distinctive drum sound was created by placing three microphones a good distance away from Bonham's drums.

This track, as well as another song entitled "The Crunge", was initially not taken seriously by many listeners, and some critics reserved their harshest criticism for these two arrangements. In an interview he gave in 1977, Jimmy Page referred to this negative response: "I didn't expect people not to get it. I thought it was pretty obvious. The song itself was a cross between reggae and a '50s number, "Poor Little Fool," Ben E. King's things, stuff like that."

Led Zeppelin bassist John Paul Jones has expressed his distaste for the song, suggesting that it started off as a studio joke and was not thought through carefully enough. Upon the album's release, Robert Plant was keen to issue the track as a single in the United Kingdom. Atlantic Records went so far as to distribute advance promotional copies to DJs (now valuable collector's items). While it was released in the US, and the single peaked at No. 20 on 29 December 1973, it was never released in the UK.

"D'yer Mak'er" is one of the few Led Zeppelin songs where all four members share the composer credit. The sleeve on the first album pressing also gives tribute to "Rosie and the Originals", a reference to the doo-wop influence in the song's style.

== Pronunciation of song title ==
In a 2005 interview, Plant discussed the different interpretations and pronunciations of the name of the song. He explained that the title is derived from an old joke, where two friends have the following exchange: "My wife's gone to the West Indies." "Jamaica?" (which in many English accents sounds like "Did you make her?") "No, she wanted to go".

The title, which does not appear in the lyrics, was chosen because it reflects the reggae feel of the song, and as an example of the Led Zeppelin band members' senses of humour. Because of the unfamiliarity of listeners to this back-story, as well as ignoring the apostrophes intentionally placed in the title, American DJs and fans often mispronounce the title as "dire maker". This confusion and mispronunciation was more common in the United States than in Britain, according to Jimmy Page.

== Reception and legacy ==
Cash Box described the song as being "unique for the group, but a real charmer." Record World called it "a rocker with a '50s flavor to it" and said that the "reggae-style beat fills the hit prescription."

In a contemporary review for Houses of the Holy, Gordon Fletcher of Rolling Stone gave "D'yer Mak'er" a negative review, calling it a "naked imitation", along with "The Crunge", as well as "easily" one of the worst things the band has ever attempted. Fletcher further wrote the track is a "pathetic stab at reggae that would probably get the Zep laughed off the island if they bothered playing it in Jamaica." Fletcher ended by writing the track is "obnoxiously heavy-handed and totally devoid of the native form's sensibilities."

Axl Rose cited it as a song that meant a lot to him as a teenager: "That got me into heavy rock." It is included on the Radio Caroline "Top 500 Tracks" of 1999 at number 453. In 2019, Rolling Stone ranked the song number 20 on its list of the 40 greatest Led Zeppelin songs.

== Personnel ==
According to Jean-Michel Guesdon and Philippe Margotin:

- Robert Plant – vocals
- Jimmy Page – electric guitars
- John Paul Jones – bass, piano
- John Bonham – drums, percussion (?)

== Charts ==
=== Weekly charts ===
Chart (1973–1974)	Peak position
Canada Top Singles (RPM)	24
New Zealand (RIANZ)	20
US Billboard Hot 100	20
US Cash Box	16
US Record World	15

=== Year–end charts ===
Chart (1974)	Position
US Cash Box	90

== Certifications ==
Region	Certification	Certified units/sales
New Zealand (RMNZ)	Gold	15,000^{‡}
^{‡} Sales+streaming figures based on certification alone.

== See also ==
- List of cover versions of Led Zeppelin songs § D'yer Mak'er

== Bibliography ==
- Guesdon, Jean-Michel; Margotin, Philippe (2018). Led Zeppelin All the Songs: The Story Behind Every Track. Running Press. ISBN 978-0-316-448-67-3.
