= Run Baby Run (Sheryl Crow song) =

1993 single by Sheryl Crow

- 1993 U.K. 7-inch and CD single cover art

Single by Sheryl Crow

from the album Tuesday Night Music Club
- Written: 1992
- Released: September 27, 1993
- Studio: Toad Hall (Pasadena, California)
- Genre: Blues
- Length: 4:53 (album version); 4:27 (single version)
- Label: A&M
- Songwriters: Bill Bottrell; David Baerwald; Sheryl Crow
- Producer: Bill Bottrell

Sheryl Crow singles chronology
"Run Baby Run" (1993)	"What I Can Do for You" (1994)

Music video
- "Run Baby Run" on YouTube

"Run Baby Run" is a song by American singer-songwriter Sheryl Crow from her first album, Tuesday Night Music Club (1993), released by A&M Records in September 1993 as her debut single. It failed to chart in the United States but peaked at No. 86 in Canada, No. 83 in the United Kingdom, and No. 45 in the Netherlands. "Run Baby Run" was released for a third time in the UK after the success of "All I Wanna Do" and "Strong Enough", reaching a new peak of No. 24 on the UK Singles Chart in July 1995.

== Background and composition ==
According to Sheryl Crow, the song was written in 1992 after the results of the presidential election were announced, marking the transition "from conservative George H. W. Bush to young, unconventional, good-looking Bill Clinton." The song describes a young woman born on November 22, 1963, "the day Aldous Huxley died" (whom Crow calls a "literary spokesperson of the 1960s"). She grew up in a conservative social structure (where people "talk of better days"), yet her parents are hippies: her mother experiments with drugs while her father is a political activist. As a result, she feels caught between generations and has learned from her parents' example to run away from problems or from people getting too close to her. Crow has stated that, while the song is not autobiographical, she can relate to certain aspects of the character.

== Critical reception ==
In his weekly UK chart commentary in Dotmusic, James Masterton described "Run Baby Run" as an "anthemic track". David Hemingway from Melody Maker commented, "And you thought all she wanted to do was have some fun!" Alan Jones from Music Week wrote, "An impressive debut for Ms Crow on a track that smacks of the Beatles' "Happiness Is a Warm Gun" and "Old Brown Shoe" in parts. Crow, who is possessed of a throaty and distinctive voice, is more likely to become a successful album artist, but this deserves to be heard."

== Chart performance ==
"Run Baby Run" was originally released in 1993 in North America, the United Kingdom, Europe, and Australia. It did not chart in the United States, but in Canada, it briefly appeared on the RPM 100 ranking, peaking at No. 86 on January 24, 1994. In 1994, the song was re-released in Europe and debuted at No. 83 on the UK Singles Chart, but it dropped out of the top 100 the following week. In late May 1994, it appeared on the Dutch Single Top 100, reaching No. 45 the week after its debut. In Australia, it stalled at No. 156 on the ARIA Singles Chart in June 1994. "Run Baby Run" was again re-issued in Europe in 1995, this time entering the UK top 30 and attaining its peak of No. 24 on July 23. During this charting period, it topped off at No. 95 on the Eurochart Hot 100. In January 1996, the track experienced a surge of popularity on Canadian adult contemporary radio, eventually peaking at No. 44 on the RPM Adult Contemporary chart.

== Track listings ==
=== 1993 release ===
- UK CD single 1
1. "Run Baby Run"
2. "All by Myself"
3. "The Na-Na Song"
4. "Reach Around Jerk"
- UK CD single 2 and European CD single
1. "Run Baby Run" (single version)
2. "Leaving Las Vegas" (acoustic version)
- UK 7-inch single

A. "Run Baby Run"
B. "All by Myself"

- Australian, Dutch, and French CD single
1. "Run Baby Run" (single version) – 4:28
2. "All by Myself"

=== 1994 release ===
- UK CD single and European maxi-CD single
1. "Run Baby Run"
2. "Leaving Las Vegas" (acoustic version)
3. "All by Myself"
4. "Reach Around Jerk"

=== 1995 release ===
- UK CD1
1. "Run Baby Run"
2. "Can't Cry Anymore" (live in Nashville)
3. "Reach Around Jerk" (live in Nashville)
4. "I Shall Believe" (live in Nashville)
- UK CD2
1. "Run Baby Run"
2. "Strong Enough" (live in Nashville)
3. "No One Said It Would Be Easy" (live in Nashville)
4. "The Na-Na Song" (live in Nashville)
- European cassette single

A. "Run Baby Run"
B. "Leaving Las Vegas" (live in Nashville)

== Charts ==
Chart (1993–1996)	Peak position
Australia (ARIA)	156
Brazil (UPI)	8
Canada Adult Contemporary (RPM)	45
Canada Top Singles (RPM)	86
Europe (Eurochart Hot 100)	95
Italy (Musica e dischi)	17
Netherlands (Dutch Top 40 Tipparade)	4
Netherlands (Single Top 100)	45
Scottish Singles Sales (Official Charts)	16
UK Singles (Official Charts)	24

== Release history ==
Region	Version	Date	Format(s)	Label(s)	Ref(s).
United Kingdom	Original release	September 27, 1993	7-inch vinyl; CD; cassette	A&M	
Australia	Original release	April 4, 1994	Cassette	A&M	
United Kingdom	First re-release	April 25, 1994	7-inch vinyl; CD; cassette	A&M	
United Kingdom	Second re-release	July 17, 1995	2× CD; cassette	A&M	
