= Leaving Las Vegas (song) =

1994 single by Sheryl Crow

- UK artwork

Single by Sheryl Crow

from the album Tuesday Night Music Club
- B-side: "The Na-Na Song"
- Released: April 4, 1994
- Studio: Toad Hall (Pasadena, California)
- Length: 5:10 (album version)
- Label: A&M
- Songwriters: Sheryl Crow; David Baerwald; Bill Bottrell; Brian MacLeod; David Ricketts; Kevin Gilbert
- Producer: Bill Bottrell

Sheryl Crow singles chronology
"What I Can Do for You" (1994)	"Leaving Las Vegas" (1994)	"All I Wanna Do" (1994)

Music video
- "Leaving Las Vegas" on YouTube

"Leaving Las Vegas" is a song co-written by David Baerwald, Bill Bottrell, Sheryl Crow, Kevin Gilbert, Brian MacLeod, and David Ricketts that appears on Crow's debut album, Tuesday Night Music Club (1993). It was produced by Bottrell and released in April 1994 by A&M Records. The song charted within the top 75 in the United States and the top 30 in Canada. The accompanying music video was directed by David Hogan and won an award at the 1994 Music Video Production Awards in Los Angeles. Crow performed the song on her live album Sheryl Crow and Friends: Live from Central Park.

== Title ==
The song's title was based on the semi-autobiographical 1990 novel of the same name by the late John O'Brien, who was a good friend of one of the song's writers, David Baerwald. After a performance on the Late Show with David Letterman, the host asked Crow if the song was autobiographical. She answered "sort of" because she had left Los Angeles. This infuriated Baerwald and the rest of the original Tuesday Night Music Club who helped write most of the album. Though O'Brien's suicide occurred soon after this incident, his family came forward to state there was no connection.

== Critical reception ==
Larry Flick from Billboard magazine wrote, "It's time for the critically revered Crow to finally get a moment of radio fame. Bright spot on her Tuesday Night Music Club album is a kicky blend of acoustic strumming and percussion. Crow's voice is raw and incredibly expressive, which helps the song's cinematic lyrics pack the powerful punch they do." Troy J. Augusto from Cash Box stated, "This slow-rolling number sports nifty acoustic guitar, dramatic lyrics and loads of Crow’s character-filled, rough-and-tumble vocal stylings. Plus she’s cute as a button and is a natural on stage. What more could you want?" Linda Ryan from the Gavin Report noted that the track "has a slow, hypnotic groove that entranced almost as thoroughly as her dusty, whiskey-soaked vocals." Pan-European magazine Music & Media commented, "Miss Crow doesn't believe in Elvis' tribute to the capital of showbizz, and gets out of town on an adventurous funky synth bassline a lot of singer/songwriters would not dare to think of." People Magazine described it as "a disillusioned, neon-dazzled desert tune".

== Music video ==
The song was accompanied by Crow's first ever promotional video. It was directed by David Hogan, who also shot her video for "All I Wanna Do". The 1993 video shows Crow performing the song with her guitar in the dark, with only some parts of her face lit up. Other scenes include famous Vegas images such as dancers and Elvis Presley lookalikes walking on a highway, "leaving Las Vegas", and Peter Berg driving with Crow in the passenger seat of his convertible. The video uses an edited version of the song. It won an award in the category for Adult Contemporary at the 1994 Music Video Production Awards in Los Angeles.

== Track listings ==
All live tracks except "What I Can Do for You" were recorded on April 15, 1994, at the 328 Club in Nashville, Tennessee. "What I Can Do for You" was recorded live at the Borderline on February 9, 1994.

- US cassette single
1. "Leaving Las Vegas" (radio fade) – 4:21
2. "The Na-Na Song" (LP version) – 3:12
- Canadian CD single
1. "Leaving Las Vegas" – 4:21
2. "Run Baby Run" – 4:53
- Australian CD single
1. "Leaving Las Vegas" (radio edit)
2. "The Na-Na Song"
3. "Reach Around Jerk"
- UK 7-inch and cassette single
1. "Leaving Las Vegas"
2. "Leaving Las Vegas" (live in Nashville)
- UK CD1
1. "Leaving Las Vegas"
2. "I Shall Believe" (live in Nashville)
3. "What I Can Do for You" (live)
- UK CD2
1. "Leaving Las Vegas" (live in Nashville)
2. "No One Said It Would Be Easy" (live in Nashville)
3. "The Na-Na Song" (live in Nashville)

== Charts ==
Chart (1994)	Peak position
Australia (ARIA)	121
Canada Top Singles (RPM)	29
Quebec (ADISQ)	8
UK Singles (Official Charts)	66
US Billboard Hot 100	60
US Alternative Airplay (Billboard)	8
US Pop Airplay (Billboard)	31

== Release history ==
Region	Date	Format(s)	Label(s)	Ref.
United States	April 4, 1994	Top 40 radio	A&M	
United Kingdom	June 6, 1994	7-inch vinyl; CD; cassette	A&M	
Australia	September 5, 1994	CD; cassette	A&M; Polydor	
