= All I Wanna Do (Sheryl Crow song) =

1994 single by Sheryl Crow

- US commercial cassette single

Single by Sheryl Crow

from the album Tuesday Night Music Club
- B-side: "Solidify"; "I'm Gonna Be a Wheel Someday"
- Released: July 12, 1994
- Studio: Toad Hall (Pasadena, California)
- Genre: Country pop
- Length: 4:32 (album version); 4:11 (remix)
- Label: A&M
- Songwriters: Sheryl Crow; Kevin Gilbert; Bill Bottrell; Wyn Cooper; David Baerwald
- Producer: Bill Bottrell

Sheryl Crow singles chronology
| "Leaving Las Vegas" (1994) | "All I Wanna Do" (1994) | "Strong Enough" (1994) |

Audio sample
- file; help

Music video
- "Sheryl Crow - All I Wanna Do" on YouTube

"All I Wanna Do" is a song performed by American singer and songwriter Sheryl Crow. It was written by Crow, David Baerwald, Bill Bottrell, and Kevin Gilbert, with lyrics adapted from Wyn Cooper's 1987 poem "Fun". Released in July 1994 by A&M Records, it was Crow's breakthrough hit from her 1993 debut album, Tuesday Night Music Club. The song is Crow's biggest US hit, peaking at number two on the Billboard Hot 100 for six consecutive weeks in late 1994 and topping the Billboard Adult Contemporary chart. It was the winner of the 1995 Grammy for Record of the Year and Best Female Pop Vocal Performance and was nominated for Song of the Year.

In addition to its US success, "All I Wanna Do" peaked at number one in Australia for one week and in Canada for four weeks, also topping the RPM Adult Contemporary Tracks chart in the latter country. In New Zealand and the United Kingdom, it peaked at number four, and in Europe, it reached the top 10 in Austria, Flanders, France, Germany, Ireland, and the Netherlands. The accompanying music video was directed by David Hogan and Roman Coppola and won an award at the 1994 Billboard Music Video Awards. Crow performed the song on her live album Sheryl Crow and Friends: Live from Central Park.

== Background and structure ==
The lyrics of the song are based on the poem "Fun" by Wyn Cooper. Cooper was inspired to write the poem by a conversation at a bar with a friend and occasional writer, Bill Ripley, in which he said "All I want is to have a little fun before I die", which became the first line of the poem. In a 1994 interview, Cooper said: "The poem isn't really about him. Or me. They're different people. They're people you can sort of see as ... well ... objective correlatives. Symbols of people like us, or what we could have been, or what we would have become if we continued to drink and do nothing with our lives."

Toad Hall Studio, where the song was recorded, was next door to the Pasadena Playhouse. Crow's producer (Bottrell) discovered Cooper's poetry book The Country of Here Below in a nearby used bookstore in Pasadena, California. Crow had written a song called "I Still Love You" but was unhappy with its lyrics; she used its melody and adapted the poem for her lyrics to "All I Wanna Do".

The song earned Cooper considerable royalties and helped to promote his book, originally published in a run of only 500 copies in 1987, into multiple reprints. After the song became popular, Ripley brought an unsuccessful lawsuit against Cooper for some of the song's royalties, which ended their friendship.

The opening spoken line, "This ain't no disco", is a reference to the song "Life During Wartime" by Talking Heads.

In 1997, after attending a performance by Crow at the Rosemont Theatre in Illinois, veteran Chicago Tribune music critic Greg Kot called the song "a rewrite of Stealers Wheel's 'Stuck in the Middle with You'".

== Critical reception ==
Larry Flick from Billboard magazine wrote, "Critical darling is poised for a long-deserved top 40 breakthrough with this breezy hand-clapper. Crow has a friendly demeanor that adds extra bounce to a sweet instrumental setting of jangly guitars and toe-tapping beats. Live-sounding jam is a fitting soundtrack to a day at the beach or speeding down the highway with the top down." Troy J. Augusto from Cash Box felt it should have been the first single from Tuesday Night Music Club. "Devil-may-care lyrics ("I like a good beer-buzz, early in the morning"), a cool country twang and Sheryl's friendly vocal style should all spell hit for this feelin'-good number. Rock, country, adult and, particularly, hits radio should all find lots to love about this low-key frolic. Don't miss the live show." In a second single review, he noted, "Seriously infectious hook, simple yet clever instrumentation and Crow's likable personality all spell a winner here. A perfect summertime track, 'All I Wanna Do' could well be the song that kicks off Sheryl's run at the big leagues." In his weekly UK chart commentary, James Masterton commented, that "All I Wanna Do" "certainly has potential to go further, not least with Lisa Loeb as a role model but my one overwhelming confession is that I honestly cannot see what all the fuss is about. It's a good record, but no more." Alan Jones from Music Week said "this cheery pop/rock smash is a wordy, but expertly delivered and invigorating confection with a catchy chorus." He added, "Brits may not smile as much as US rock buyers, but they'll grin enough to get this into the chart."

== Music video ==
The music video for "All I Wanna Do" was directed by David Hogan and Roman Coppola, with Martin Coppen directing photography. It features Crow and her band performing the song on the street, with notable characters flying through the air. The video was filmed in front of the Roxy Theatre at the corner of Franklin Street and North 1st Street in Clarksville, Tennessee. It won an award for Best New Artist Clip of the Year in the category for Pop/AC at the 1994 Billboard Music Video Awards.

Two versions of the music video exist. The original video featured the character "Billy", mentioned in the song, played by actor Gregory Sporleder. A second version of the video was released with the character's appearances edited out. The edited version appears on Crow's "Greatest Hits" music video DVD. In 2009, an additional music video was released, featured on the 2009 re-release of Tuesday Night Music Club.

== Impact and legacy ==
In 2009, "All I Wanna Do" was ranked number 30 on Entertainment Weekly's "The 100 Greatest Summer Songs", saying, "Barfly-poetry verses outta Tom Waits meet a chorus veritably lifted from Brian Wilson's picnic basket: It's the most literary-minded mindless summer single ever." In 2017, Billboard ranked it number three on their list of the "10 Greatest Sheryl Crow Songs". In 2023, The Guardian ranked the song number five on their list of the "20 Greatest Sheryl Crow Songs", while Billboard ranked it number 405 in their "500 Best Pop Songs of All Time". The latter added, "Well, it ain't no disco and it ain't no country club neither — it's the L.A.-set slice-of-life breakout hit for singer-songwriter Sheryl Crow, a "Piano Man" for the alt-rock '90s."

== Track listings ==
- US cassette single (cat. no. 31458 0702 4)
1. "All I Wanna Do" (Remix)
2. "Solidify"
- French CD single (cat. no. 580-654-2)
1. "All I Wanna Do"
2. "What I Can Do for You" – Live at the Borderline
- German CD single (cat. no. 580-655-2)
1. "All I Wanna Do"
2. "I Shall Believe" – Live in Nashville
3. "What I Can Do for You" – Live at the Borderline
- UK CD 1 (cat. no. 580-843-2)
1. "All I Wanna Do" – Remix
2. "Solidify"
3. "I'm Gonna Be A Wheel Someday"
- European CD single (cat. no. 580-844-2)
1. "All I Wanna Do"
- UK CD 2 (cat. no. 580-845-2)
1. "All I Wanna Do" – live acoustic for Virgin Radio UK
2. "Run Baby Run" – Live acoustic for Virgin Radio UK
3. "Leaving Las Vegas" – Live acoustic for Virgin Radio UK

== Charts ==
=== Weekly charts ===
| Chart (1994–1995) | Peak position |
|---|---|
| Australia (ARIA) | 1 |
| Austria (Ö3 Austria Top 40) | 5 |
| Belgium (Ultratop 50 Flanders) | 10 |
| Belgium (Ultratop 50 Wallonia) | 31 |
| Canada Top Singles (RPM) | 1 |
| Canada Adult Contemporary (RPM) | 1 |
| Europe (Eurochart Hot 100) | 13 |
| Europe (European AC Radio) | 4 |
| Europe (European Hit Radio) | 2 |
| France (SNEP) | 5 |
| Germany (GfK) | 10 |
| Iceland (Íslenski Listinn Topp 40) | 4 |
| Ireland (IRMA) | 5 |
| Israel (Israeli Singles Chart) | 2 |
| Japan (Oricon) | 5 |
| Mexico (Notitas Musicales) | 3 |
| Netherlands (Dutch Top 40) | 15 |
| Netherlands (Single Top 100) | 10 |
| New Zealand (Recorded Music NZ) | 4 |
| Norway (VG-lista) | 15 |
| Quebec (ADISQ) | 5 |
| Scottish Singles Sales (Official Charts) | 3 |
| Switzerland (Schweizer Hitparade) | 13 |
| UK Singles (Official Charts) | 4 |
| UK Airplay (Music Week) | 1 |
| US Billboard Hot 100 | 2 |
| US Adult Contemporary (Billboard) | 1 |
| US Adult Pop Airplay (Billboard) | 32 |
| US Alternative Airplay (Billboard) | 4 |
| US Mainstream Rock Airplay (Billboard) | 35 |
| US Pop Airplay (Billboard) | 1 |
| US Rhythmic Airplay (Billboard) | 31 |

=== Year-end charts ===
| Chart (1994) | Position |
|---|---|
| Australia (ARIA) | 34 |
| Brazil (Mais Tocadas) | 14 |
| Canada Top Singles (RPM) | 7 |
| Canada Adult Contemporary (RPM) | 47 |
| Germany (Media Control) | 93 |
| Iceland (Íslenski Listinn Topp 40) | 16 |
| Netherlands (Dutch Top 40) | 116 |
| UK Singles (OCC) | 58 |
| US Billboard Hot 100 | 34 |
| US Adult Contemporary (Billboard) | 41 |
| US Modern Rock Tracks (Billboard) | 14 |
| US Cash Box Top 100 | 21 |

| Chart (1995) | Position |
|---|---|
| Australia (ARIA) | 78 |
| Belgium (Ultratop 50 Wallonia) | 38 |
| Europe (Eurochart Hot 100) | 72 |
| France (SNEP) | 46 |
| UK Airplay (Music Week) | 17 |
| US Billboard Hot 100 | 67 |

== Certifications ==
| Region | Certification | Certified units/sales |
|---|---|---|
| Australia (ARIA) | 3× Platinum | 210,000^{‡} |
| Japan (RIAJ) | Platinum | 100,000^{^} |
| New Zealand (RMNZ) | Platinum | 30,000^{‡} |
| United Kingdom (BPI) | Gold | 400,000^{‡} |
| United States (RIAA) | Gold | 500,000^{^} |
^{^} Shipments figures based on certification alone.^{‡} Sales+streaming figures based on certification alone.

== Release history ==
| Region | Date | Format(s) | Label(s) | Ref. |
|---|---|---|---|---|
| United States | July 12, 1994 | 7-inch vinyl; cassette | A&M | |
| Japan | August 25, 1994 | Mini-CD | A&M | |
| Australia | October 17, 1994 | CD; cassette | A&M; Polydor | |
| United Kingdom | October 24, 1994 | 7-inch vinyl; CD; cassette | A&M | |

== Cover versions ==
=== Amy Studt version ===
"All I Wanna Do"

Single by Amy Studt

from the album False Smiles (re-release)
- B-side: "Forget It All" "You're the Breeze"
- Released: January 12, 2004
- Length: 3:55
- Label: Polydor; 19
- Songwriters: Wyn Cooper; Sheryl Crow; David Baerwald; Bill Bottrell; Kevin Gilbert
- Producer: David Eriksen

Amy Studt singles chronology
| "Under the Thumb" (2003) | "All I Wanna Do" (2004) | "Furniture" (2007) |

English singer-songwriter Amy Studt released a cover version of "All I Wanna Do" as her fourth single. Studt was asked personally by Sheryl Crow to record a cover of the song, and Crow provided backing vocals on the track.

Released on January 12, 2004, the single reached a peak of number 21 on the UK Singles Chart and number 25 on the Irish Singles Chart. It was taken from the re-release of her debut album, False Smiles. Following the peaking of "All I Wanna Do", Studt was dropped from her record label Polydor for poor sales.

==== Track listing ====
- UK CD single
1. "All I Wanna Do"
2. "Forget It All"
3. "You're the Breeze"
4. "All I Wanna Do" (video)

==== Charts ====
| Chart (2004) | Peak position |
|---|---|
| Ireland (IRMA) | 25 |
| Scottish Singles Sales (Official Charts) | 17 |
| UK Singles (Official Charts) | 21 |

=== Other versions ===
US singer Joanne Farrell released a dance version of the song in 1995. The song reached number 40 on the Billboard Dance Club Play chart; it also reached number 40 on the Official UK Singles Chart.
