= Bill Bottrell =

American record producer and songwriter

- Born: William Allen Bottrell; California, U.S.
- Occupations: Record producer; songwriter
- Years active: 1974–present
- Website: billbottrell.com

William Allen Bottrell is an American record producer and songwriter, perhaps best known for his production and uncredited guest appearance on Michael Jackson's 1991 single "Black or White", which topped the Billboard Hot 100. A Grammy Award recipient and six-time nominee, he has also produced for musical acts such as Madonna, Tom Petty, Electric Light Orchestra, Sheryl Crow, Elton John, Rusted Root and Five for Fighting, among others.

== Biography ==
Between 1967 and 1970, Bottrell attended Crescenta Valley Senior High in La Crescenta, California, he spent his junior year (1968–1969) at The Frankfurt International School in Oberursel, West Germany. He graduated in 1970 from Crescenta Valley Senior High. He attended the University of California, Santa Barbara between 1970 and 1972, studying for a bachelor's degree in music.

In 1974, he married Elizabeth Jordan, whom he met in high school. That same year, Bottrell got his first job in music, as an engineer at California Recording Studio in Hollywood. In 1978, he moved over to Soundcastle Studios in Silverlake, where he met Jeff Lynne, who eventually hired him to engineer for ELO. In 1979 his daughter Adrianne was born. The 1980s were spent freelance engineering between Europe and Los Angeles, with clients including: The Jacksons, ELO, Michael Jackson, Madonna, George Harrison, Starship and Tom Petty. Daughter Laura was born in 1983. He worked for Michael Jackson at his house in Encino between 1983 and 1986, recording tracks for Bad. In 1988, Bottrell co-produced his first record, Aliens Ate My Buick by Thomas Dolby. In 1989, Michael Jackson asked him to co-produce, engineer and write songs for his album Dangerous, co-writing and rapping on the album's biggest hit, "Black or White". The song spent 7 weeks at number one on the U.S. Billboard Hot 100 chart in the fall of 1991.

Bottrell's son William was born under difficult circumstances in 1990. That year, Bottrell built his own recording studio, Toad Hall Studio, next door to the Pasadena Playhouse in Pasadena, California and founded a weekly jam session called the "Tuesday Night Music Club". One of the resulting acts was Sheryl Crow, whose 1993 debut album (produced and co-written by Bottrell) was entitled Tuesday Night Music Club. Her single "All I Wanna Do" from that album won the Grammy Award for Record of the Year at the 37th Annual awards in 1994 for Bottrell and Crow. The album won two additional Grammys and sold 3.8 million in the US.

Bottrell was nominated for another Grammy for his work on Shelby Lynne's 1999 breakout album, I Am Shelby Lynne. During the making of that album, he closed his recording studio and moved his family of five to Northern California. His son William died after falling off a cliff in 1998. Bottrell separated from Elizabeth in 1998 and the couple divorced in 2000.

In 2020, Bottrell participated virtually in Kingvention: KV Global, the online edition of the annual Michael Jackson fan convention held during the COVID-19 pandemic. He later appeared in person at the 2022 Kingvention event in London.

== Discography ==
- 1981: "Hold On Tight" – Electric Light Orchestra
- 1983: Northbound – Northbound
- 1983: Secret Messages – Electric Light Orchestra
- 1984: Victory – The Jacksons
- 1986: Balance of Power – Electric Light Orchestra
- 1987: Bad – Michael Jackson
- 1988: Aliens Ate My Buick – Thomas Dolby
- 1988: Traveling Wilburys Vol. 1 – Traveling Wilburys
- 1988: "Streetwalker" – Michael Jackson (released 2001)
- 1989: Like a Prayer – Madonna
- 1989: Full Moon Fever – Tom Petty
- 1989: "Monkey Business" – Michael Jackson (released 2004)
- 1990: I'm Breathless: Music from and Inspired by the Film Dick Tracy – Madonna
- 1990: Toy Matinee – Toy Matinee
- 1991: Truth or Dare – Madonna
- 1991: Dangerous – Michael Jackson
- 1991: "Black or White" – Michael Jackson
- 1991: "Give In to Me" – Michael Jackson
- 1991: "Who Is It" – Michael Jackson
- 1991: No Soul No Strain – Wire Train
- 1992: Triage – David Baerwald
- 1993: Tuesday Night Music Club – Sheryl Crow
- 1994: When I Woke – Rusted Root
- 1995: "Earth Song" – Michael Jackson
- 1995: In Flight – Linda Perry
- 1997: Restless Heart – Tex Beaumont
- 1999: I Am Shelby Lynne – Shelby Lynne
- 2000: "Surrender" – Tom Petty and the Heartbreakers
- 2000: "For Real" – Tom Petty and the Heartbreakers (released in 2019)
- 2000: The House We Built – Alisha's Attic
- 2001: Songs from the West Coast – Elton John
- 2002: Welcome to My Party – Rusted Root
- 2002: Class of Dude – The Stokemen
- 2002: Rise – Kim Richey
- 2003: Free – Luan Parle
- 2004: Liam Titcomb – Liam Titcomb
- 2004: Benji Hughes – Benji Hughes (unreleased)
- 2004: The Battle for Everything – Five for Fighting
- 2005: Annie Stela – Annie Stela
- 2005: Sierra Swan – Sierra Swan
- 2005: Black Cadillac – Rosanne Cash
- 2006: "Save Me from Myself" – Christina Aguilera
- 2006: Bird on a Wire – Toby Lightman
- 2006: On The Jungle Floor – Van Hunt
- 2007: Ex-Sensitive – Ben Jelen
- 2008: Detours – Sheryl Crow
