= The Best of 415 Records =

Compilation album by Various
- Released: 1994
- Genre: Rock, new wave
- Label: Sony/415
- Producer: David Kahne, Ric Ocasek, Ed Stasium, Tim Palmer

Professional ratings
Review scores
Source	Rating
AllMusic	4/5 stars

The Best of 415 Records is a compilation album.

== Track listing ==
- Wire Train
  - 1. Chamber of Hellos
  - 2. With God on Our Side
  - 3. She Comes On
- Romeo Void
  - 4. A Girl in Trouble
  - 5. Never Say Never
  - 6. Not Safe
- Red Rockers
  - 7. China
  - 8. Guns of Revolution
  - 9. Dead Heroes
- Translator
  - 10. Everywhere That I'm Not
  - 11. When I Am with You
  - 12. Everywhere
  - 13. I Need You to Love
- Until December
  - 14. We Are the Boys
  - 15. Until December
  - 16. Geisha
  - 17. Heaven
