= Howie Klein =

American political activist and record company executive (1948–2025)

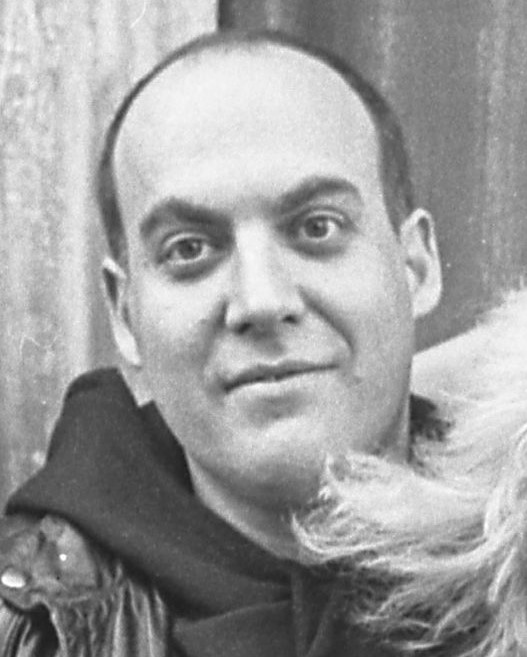
Klein in 1984

Howard Klein (February 20, 1948 – December 24, 2025) was an American writer, political activist, media personality, and onetime record label executive, DJ and producer. He was the president of Reprise Records from 1989 to 2001. He appeared occasionally as himself in music- and political-related film documentaries and received accolades for his stance against censorship and for his advocacy of free speech protection.

== Early life ==
Howie Klein was born in Brooklyn on February 20, 1948. He attended Stony Brook University in New York, graduating in 1969. He gained his first experience working in the music industry with the Stony Brook Students Activities Board, writing about bands and booking them for local performances. Notable acts he successfully promoted during those years included Big Brother, Byrds, Jackson Browne, Tim Buckley, Sandy Bull, Country Joe McDonald, the Doors, the Fugs, the Grateful Dead, Jefferson Airplane, John Hammond, Jimi Hendrix, Joni Mitchell, Pink Floyd, Otis Redding, the Who, and the Yardbirds.

Klein then spent several years exploring Afghanistan, India, Nepal, and Amsterdam.

== Career ==
=== San Francisco ===
Klein moved to San Francisco, and from 1976 to 1978 hosted the first regular punk radio show The Outcastes on KSAN with co-hosts Norman Davis, and Chris Knab, then-owner of Aquarius Records on Castro Street. The radio show allowed Klein to interview bands such as the Sex Pistols, Iggy Pop, Devo, the Cramps, the Dead Boys, the Nuns, and Roky Erickson. While Klein lived in San Francisco, he also hosted, with Ian Kallen and Ron Quintana, Rampage Radio, a 6-hour Heavy Metal radio show, from 1982 to 2011 on KUSF, later, at Radio Valencia.

In 1978, he and Knab, with Bruce Bridges, co-founded the San Francisco new wave record label, 415 Records. Klein discovered and signed the Nuns, the Units, Romeo Void, Translator, and Wire Train among others.

=== Los Angeles ===
Klein joined Sire Records in 1987 and was president of Reprise/Warner Bros. Records between 1989 and 2001. During his tenure at Reprise, he attracted artists to the upscale label such as Lou Reed, with whom he had worked while at Sire. There, he oversaw the career development of recording artists such as Depeche Mode, Talking Heads, Joni Mitchell, the Ramones, the Pretenders, Neil Young, Alanis Morissette, Barenaked Ladies, Eric Clapton, Green Day, Enya, Fleetwood Mac, the Smiths, Ice-T, and dozens of other major acts. Following the Time Warner merger with AOL, on June 29, 2001, Klein resigned; accepting a buyout. David Kahne, who had worked for Klein as 415 Records' A&R manager until 1982, now temporarily controlled Reprise as executive vice president of A&R for its parent company, Warner Bros. The same day Klein resigned, Kahne rejected Wilco's newly recorded album, Yankee Hotel Foxtrot, leading to the termination of Wilco's multi-album contract with Reprise. The Washington Post noted that the change marked a "seismic shift" from the label's former "artist-friendly" reputation.

=== Anti-censorship efforts ===
During and after his work with Sire and Reprise, Klein distinguished himself as a stalwart opponent of censorship and a dedicated advocate of free speech. Reprise Records was started by Frank Sinatra in 1960, securing what he saw as artistic freedom from his former record label, Capitol Records Klein carried Sinatra's tradition further, clearly articulating his even broader vision that creative freedom was not limited only to choosing one's business and music partners, but also encompassed the freedom to write, even about controversial topics, as one saw fit.

The 1992 United States presidential election saw Bill Clinton choose Senator Al Gore as his vice presidential running mate. This decision disturbed many Democrats and music industry professionals, including Klein, because Gore's wife, Tipper Gore, with Susan Baker, had co-founded the Parents Music Resource Center. The PMRC had initiated Senate hearings in 1985 on "potentially harmful lyrics", spearheading a five-year effort that by 1990 had successfully forced the recording industry to implement a voluntary identification and labeling system to warn parents about music containing explicit lyrics. Tipper Gore's vocal and instrumental role in the PMRC was perceived by some as a campaign of outright censorship against musicians and the music industry itself. Klein took an active role in publicizing these concerns through speaking engagements and by becoming one of the most influential supporters of a very effective, multimillion-dollar, industry-wide campaign to register and educate young music-loving voters, called Rock the Vote.

His anti-censorship efforts earned him one of two Spirit of Liberty Awards bestowed in 1999 by People for the American Way; co-honored that year was filmmaker and actor Rob Reiner. Klein created a CD for the awards ceremony, demonstrating his unflinching support for protection of the artistic freedom to convey important social and political ideas in ways that might scare the establishment. Fuck Censorship was a compilation of censored and off-color songs celebrating everything from cannabis to cross-dressing; the liner notes of which contained a pointed message from Klein, "Sometimes protecting freedom of speech isn't pretty." In 2000, the American Civil Liberties Union of Southern California honored him with its "Bill of Rights Award" for his activism in the protection of free speech. He served on the board of directors for People for the American Way.

=== Post-Reprise ===
Klein appeared (as himself) in several music documentary films: Lifestyles of the Ramones (2001), a George Seminara film about the Ramones; I Am Trying to Break Your Heart (2002), a Sam Jones film about Wilco; and Fix (2011), a Doug Free film about Ministry.

In early 2005, he was appointed to the board of directors of JamBase.com, a San Francisco-based internet search engine company focused on concert and tour date information, whose founder and CEO Andy Gadiel cited Klein's reputation as "a true artist's advocate".

On August 25, 2011, the Rock & Roll Hall of Fame and Museum archived a gift from Klein, the Howie Klein Collection, consisting of research materials evidencing a broad cross-section of musical acts that appeared on Sire, Reprise, and Warner Brothers labels and spanning his tenure as a record company executive between 1983 and 2001. The collection comprises several videocassettes of electronic press kits, tubed posters, artist itineraries, and a three-ring binder containing the Warner/Chappell "Mighty Three Music Catalog". It also contains a certificate for 1000 shares of 415 Records, Ltd. While copyright interests in the collection were not transferred, its contents are open for research. Housed in the collection are materials related to all three record companies and to bands and musical artists including B-52's, Babes in Toyland, Barenaked Ladies, BoDeans, Nick Cave and the Bad Seeds, Kasey Chambers, Eric Clapton, the Cult, Depeche Mode, Tanya Donelly, Erasure, Faith No More, Filter, Fleetwood Mac, Chris Isaak, Rikki Lee Jones, Chaka Khan, The Living End, Joni Mitchell, Modey Lemon, Nu Flavor, Orgy, Recoil, Lou Reed, the Replacements, Snake River Conspiracy, Steely Dan, Temple of Hiphop, Videodrone, Neil Young, and Zwan.

Klein lived in Los Angeles, where he wrote the progressive political blog DownWithTyranny! and regularly guest-blogged on Crooks and Liars.com's Late Night Music Club feature and on Firedoglake.com. He was the founder and treasurer of Blue America PAC, served on the board of directors for the Progressive Congress Action Fund, and was a member of the Drum Major Institute for Public Policy's Netroots Advisory Council. He was also an adjunct professor of music at McGill University in Montreal, where he sometimes lectured.

Klein was a frequent collaborator with comedian and political commentator David Feldman on the David Feldman Show.

== Death ==
Klein died from pancreatic cancer on December 24, 2025, at the age of 77.

== In popular culture ==
In his song "Talking Christmas Goodwill Blues," John Wesley Harding mentions a meeting with Klein and Seymour Stein who ask him to record a Christmas song.
