= Jeff Trott =

American singer-songwriter

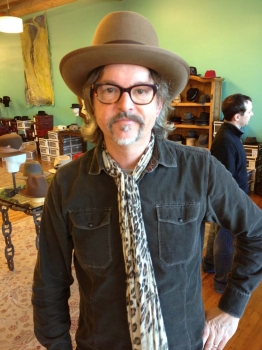
- Trott in 2015

Background information
- Born: Jeffrey Robert Trott; San Mateo, California, U.S.
- Origin: San Francisco, California, U.S.
- Genres: Pop; rock; singer-songwriter; indie rock; country; blues; alternative rock; indie folk
- Occupations: Record producer; songwriter; instrumentalist
- Instruments: Vocals; electric guitar; acoustic guitars; mandolin; bass; keyboards; lapsteel; veena
- Website: www.jefftrott.com

Jeffrey Robert Trott is an American songwriter and record producer from San Francisco, California. He is perhaps most well-known for his collaborations with American singer Sheryl Crow, having co-written some of her biggest hits, including "If It Makes You Happy", "Everyday Is a Winding Road", and "Soak Up the Sun"; he also produced tracks on her albums C'mon, C'mon, Wildflower, Be Myself, and Threads. Trott won the BMI Songwriter of the Year award in 1998.

== Early years ==
Trott was born and raised in the San Francisco Bay Area and got his start in a post-punk band called the Lifers. He then joined another San Francisco band, Wire Train, first appearing on their third and final album for Columbia Records, 1987's Ten Women, after which the label dropped the band. During this time, Trott was invited to join the successful UK band World Party in the studio, and appeared on their critically-acclaimed 1990 album Goodbye Jumbo. Wire Train went on to release two more albums on MCA Records, Wire Train (1990) and No Soul No Strain (1992).

== Career ==
=== Writing ===
Trott's songwriting collaborators include Gemma Hayes, Colbie Caillat, Jason Mraz, John Paul White (of the Civil Wars), Augustana, Rob Thomas, Guster, Natasha Bedingfield, Michelle Branch, Meiko, Liz Phair, Roger Daltrey (The Who), Joe Cocker, Stevie Nicks, Counting Crows, and Marc Broussard.

=== Producing ===
Trott's credits as a producer include Sheryl Crow, Stevie Nicks, Augustana, Joshua Radin, Meiko, Pete Francis (of Dispatch), and Griffin House. In 2009, Trott produced the Samantha Stollenwerck album Carefree, which featured members of Beck's band, including Brian LeBarton, Roger Manning Jr., Justin Meldal-Johnsen, Joey Waronker, and Lyle Workman. He also produced Heartstrings, the 2014 debut album by actress/singer-songwriter Leighton Meester. More recently, Trott and Frank Rogers co-produced 2019's Imperfect Circle by Hootie & the Blowfish.

=== Movie and television ===
Trott scored Kevin Watkins' 2008 animated short film Hose. He produced the soundtrack for the indie movie Janie Jones, featuring Abigail Breslin and Alessandro Nivola, in 2011.

His work has gotten many placements in hit television shows like Parenthood and Grey's Anatomy, as well as in singing competition shows such as American Idol, The Voice, and The X Factor.

In 2012, Sheryl Crow was invited by journalist Katie Couric to write the theme song for her then-new talk show, Katie. The song, titled "This Day", was nominated for a Daytime Emmy Award in the category Outstanding Original Song.

=== Solo project ===
In 2000, Trott recorded and produced his first solo album, Dig Up the Astroturf, with Keith Schreiner, an electronic musician and producer based in Portland, Oregon. His stated reason for making a solo record was to understand "every aspect of making a record, mastering, artwork, branding and PR in order to know firsthand what an artist goes through during the process of making a record." The CD was released on Trott's own indie label, Black Apple.

== Accolades ==
=== BMI Songwriter Award ===
The BMI Awards are annual award ceremonies for songwriters in various genres organized by Broadcast Music, Inc. The main pop music award was founded in 1952. The 63rd Annual BMI Pop Awards were held at the Beverly Wilshire Hotel in Beverly Hills, California, on May 13, 2015.

Year	Award name	Result
1998	BMI Songwriter Award	Won

=== Daytime Emmy Awards ===
The Daytime Emmy Awards are awards presented by the New York–based National Academy of Television Arts and Sciences and the Los Angeles–based Academy of Television Arts & Sciences in recognition of excellence in American daytime television programming. Jeff Trott and Sheryl Crow have received one nomination in the category Outstanding Original Song.

Year	Nominated work	Award name	Result
2013	"This Day"	Outstanding Original Song (shared with Sheryl Crow)	Nominated

=== Grammy Awards ===
Year	Nominated work	Award name	Result
2023	"Forever"	Best American Roots Song (shared with Sheryl Crow)	Nominated

== Discography ==
=== Sheryl Crow ===
Sheryl Crow (1996)

No.	Title	Writer(s)	Length
2	"A Change Would Do You Good"	Crow, Jeff Trott, Brian MacLeod	3:50
4	"Sweet Rosalyn"	Crow, Trott	3:58
5	"If It Makes You Happy"	Crow, Trott	5:23
8	"Everyday Is a Winding Road"	Crow, MacLeod, Trott	4:16
10	"Oh Marie"	Crow, Trott, Bill Bottrell	3:30
11	"Superstar"	Crow, Trott	4:58
12	"The Book"	Crow, Trott	4:34

The Globe Sessions (1998)

No.	Title	Writer(s)	Length
1	"My Favorite Mistake"	Crow, Trott	4:08
2	"There Goes the Neighborhood"	Crow, Trott	5:02
4	"It Don't Hurt"	Crow, Trott	4:49
5	"Maybe That's Something"	Crow, Trott	4:17

C'mon C'mon (2002)

No.	Title	Writer(s)	Length
2	"Soak Up the Sun"	Crow, Trott	4:52
3	"You're an Original"	Crow, Trott	4:18
8	"Lucky Kid"	Crow, Trott	4:02
11	"Abilene"	Crow, Trott	4:45

Wildflower (2005)

No.	Title	Writer(s)	Length
3	"Good Is Good"	Crow, Trott	4:18
4	"Chances Are"	Crow, Trott	5:16
6	"Lifetimes"	Crow, Trott	4:12
7	"Letter to God"	Crow, Trott	4:04
8	"Live It Up"	Crow, Trott	3:42
9	"I Don't Wanna Know"	Crow, Trott	4:28
11	"Where Has All the Love Gone"	Crow, Trott	3:40

Detours (2008)

No.	Title	Writers(s)	Length
4	"Peace Be Upon Us"	Crow, Trott, Bottrell, Mike Elizondo	4:22
5	"Gasoline"	Crow, Trott, Bottrell	5:07
10	"Diamond Ring"	Crow, Trott	4:10

Feels Like Home (2013)

No	Title	Writer(s)	Length
2	"Easy"	Crow, Chris DuBois, Trott	4:10
3	"Give It to Me"	Crow, Trott	3:57

Be Myself (2017)

No	Title	Writer(s)	Length
1	"Alone in the Dark"	Crow, Trott	3:40
2	"Halfway There"	Crow, Trott	3:59
2	"Long Way Back"	Crow, Trott	5:07
4	"Be Myself"	Crow, Trott	4:22
5	"Roller Skate"	Crow, Trott	3:19
6	"Love Will Save the Day"	Crow, Trott	4:58
7	"Strangers Again"	Crow, Trott	3:51
8	"Rest of Me"	Crow, Trott	3:52
9	"Heartbeat Away"	Crow, Trott	5:35
10	"Grow Up"	Crow, Trott	3:27
11	"Woo Woo"	Crow, Toby Gad, Trott	3:14

Threads (2019)

No	Title	Writer(s)	Length
2	"Live Wire"	Crow, Trott	5:09
7	"Cross Creek Road"	Crow, Trott	4:46
13	"Wouldn't Want to Be Like You"	Crow, Trott	3:35
15	"Nobody's Perfect"	Crow, Trott	4:43

=== Counting Crows ===
Hard Candy (2002)

No.	Title	Writer (s)	Length
14	"4 White Stallions"	Trott, John Vickery, Patrick Winningham	4:21

=== Marc Broussard ===
Carencro (2004)

No.	Title	Writer(s)	Length
2	"Rocksteady"	Broussard, Trott, Mike Elizondo, David Ryan Harris	4:03

=== Augustana ===
Augustana (2011)

No.	Title	Writer(s)	Length
5	"Borrowed Time"	Trott, Dan Layus	3:10

=== Joe Cocker ===
Fire It Up (2012)

No	Title	Writer(s)	Length
2	"I'll Be Your Doctor"	Trott, Victoria Horn, Steve McMorran	3:30

=== Hootie & the Blowfish ===
Imperfect Circle (2019)

No	Title	Writer(s)	Length
1	"New Year's Day"	(Tofer Brown, Hootie & the Blowfish, Eric Paslay, Trott)	3:32
5	"Turn It Up"	(Hootie & the Blowfish, Paslay, Trott)	3:21
9	"Lonely on a Saturday Night"	(Hootie & the Blowfish, Paslay, Trott)	3:10

=== Others ===
- World Party, Goodbye Jumbo (1990)
- Stevie Nicks, Trouble in Shangri-La (2001)
- Minnie Driver. Everything I've Got in My Pocket (2004)
- Rob Thomas, ...Something to Be (2005)
- Rob Thomas, ...Something More (2005)
- Aimee Mann, The Forgotten Arm (2005)
- Toni Childs, Keep the Faith (2008)
