= Driving (disambiguation) =

Driving is the process of controlling a vehicle.

Driving or drivin' may also refer to:

- Driving (horse), the control of an equine harnessed to a vehicle or to a piece of mobile equipment that, for example, carries out agricultural work
- Driving (social), the act of influencing a person's behaviour
- Combined driving, an equestrian sport involving carriage driving
- Driving force, an externally applied force that changes the frequency of a harmonic oscillator
- Droving, the practice of walking livestock over long distances
- Herding, the act of influencing livestock to move in a particular direction

== Art and entertainment ==
- alternate name for In the Car, a Roy Lichtenstein painting
- "Drivin'" (Pearl Harbor and the Explosions song), 1979
- "Drivin'" (The Kinks song), 1969
- "Driving" (Bluey), a 2021 television episode
