= In a Chamber =

Studio album by Wire Train
- Released: January 10, 1984
- Recorded: 1983
- Studio: The Automatt (San Francisco)
- Genres: Alternative rock; new wave
- Length: 35:26
- Label: 415/Columbia
- Producer: David Kahne

Wire Train chronology
In a Chamber (1984)	Between Two Words (1985)

Singles from In a Chamber
- 1. "Chamber of Hellos" Released: 1983; 2. "I'll Do You" Released: 1984

Professional ratings
Review scores
Source	Rating
AllMusic	4.5/5 stars

In a Chamber is the debut studio album by the rock band Wire Train, released on January 10, 1984, on San Francisco-based 415/Columbia Records. The album contains the band's first single, "Chamber of Hellos", released in late 1983.

== Track listing ==
All tracks are written by Kevin Hunter and Kurt Herr, except where noted.

Side one
No.	Title	Length
1.	"I'll Do You"	3:02
2.	"Everything's Turning Up Down Again"	3:21
3.	"Never"	3:45
4.	"Like"	2:56
5.	"I Forget It All (When I See You)"	4:01

Side two
No.	Title	Length
6.	"Chamber of Hellos"	3:55
7.	"Slow Down"	3:45
8.	"She's on Fire"	2:54
9.	"I Gotta Go"	3:50
10.	"Love Against Me"	3:20
Total length:		35:26

Bonus tracks (2017 reissue)
No.	Title	Writer(s)	Length
11.	"It’s Only Dark"		3:27
12.	"Personne Jamais"		3:48
13.	"Mr. Soul"	Neil Young	3:48
14.	"Chamber of Hellos (London Mix)"		4:02
15.	"I’ll Do You (Ivan Ivan Extended Remix)"		6:12
16.	"Chamber of Hellos (Ivan Ivan Extended Remix)"		5:19
Total length:			62:02

== Personnel ==
=== Wire Train ===
- Kevin Hunter – guitar, lead vocals (1, 2, 5, 7–10), backing vocals
- Kurt Herr – guitar, lead vocals (3, 4, 6), backing vocals
- Anders Rundblad – bass
- Federico Gil-Solá – drums

=== Technical ===
- Produced and engineered by David Kahne
- Assistant engineer – Maureen Droney
- Band photography – Trudy Fisher
- Cover concept and polaroids – Bruce Fletcher and Frank Zincavage
- Art mechanicals – Diane Zincavage
