= Heartbeats and Triggers =

Heartbeats And Triggers

Studio album by Translator
- Released: 1982
- Studios: The Automatt, Iguana Studios
- Label: 415/Columbia
- Producer: David Kahne

Translator chronology
Heartbeats And Triggers (1982)	No Time Like Now (1983)

Professional ratings
Review scores
Source	Rating
Allmusic	3/5 stars

Heartbeats And Triggers is the debut album by American rock band Translator. It was released in 1982 on 415 Records and was distributed by Columbia Records. It contains the hit single, "Everywhere That I'm Not". Some LP copies of this album made use of the short-lived CX noise reduction system which was introduced by Columbia Records.

In 2007 the album was re-issued on CD by Wounded Bird Records. The three other albums Translator released between 1982 and 1986 were also re-issued at the same time.

== Track listing ==
1. "Everywhere That I'm Not" (Steven Barton) 4:03
2. "Necessary Spinning" (Barton) 3:41
3. "Everything You See" (Robert Darlington) 3:35
4. "When I Am With You" (Barton) 3:06
5. "Nothing Is Saving Me" (Barton, Darlington, Larry Dekker, David Scheff) 5:16
6. "Sleeping Snakes" (Barton) 3:37
7. "Favorite Drug" (Barton, Darlington, Dekker, Scheff) 3:32
8. "Everywhere" (Darlington) 3:19
9. "Dark Region" (Barton, Darlington, Dekker, Scheff) 2:31
10. "My Heart, Your Heart" (Barton) 3:43

2007 CD Bonus tracks

11. "Everywhere That I'm Not" (Single Version)
12. "Current Events" (Single Version)
13. "When I Am With You" (Extended Single Version)
