= Between Two Words =

Studio album by Wire Train
- Released: September 12, 1985
- Studio: Studio Motiva (Vienna)
- Genres: Alternative rock; new wave
- Length: 39:26
- Label: 415/Columbia
- Producer: Peter Maunu

Wire Train chronology
In a Chamber (1983)	Between Two Words (1985)	Ten Women (1987)

Professional ratings
Review scores
Source	Rating
AllMusic	3/5 stars

Between Two Words is the second studio album by American alternative rock band Wire Train, released on September 12, 1985, by Columbia and 415 Records. It was the first Wire Train recording with drummer Brian MacLeod. Guitarist Kurt Herr left during the recording sessions. Additional guitars were performed by producer Peter Maunu.

== Track listing ==
Side one
No.	Title	Writer(s)	Length
1.	"Last Perfect Thing"	Kevin Hunter	3:52
2.	"Skills of Summer"	Hunter; Kurt Herr	4:03
3.	"When She Was a Girl"	Hunter; Herr; Tom Chauncey	4:27
4.	"God on Our Side"	Bob Dylan	4:29
5.	"Love, Love"	Hunter; Herr; Anders Rundblad; Brian MacLeod	3:15

Side two
No.	Title	Writer(s)	Length
6.	"I Will"	Hunter; Herr; Rundblad	4:21
7.	"No Pretties"	Hunter; Herr; Rundblad; MacLeod	4:25
8.	"The Ocean"	Hunter	4:05
9.	"Two Persons"	Hunter; Rundblad	2:54
10.	"Home"	Rundblad	3:35
Total length:			39:26

== Personnel ==
Adapted from the album's liner notes.

=== Wire Train ===
- Kevin Hunter – guitar, lead vocals (1–4, 6, 9), backing vocals
- Kurt Herr – guitar, lead vocals (5, 7, 8), backing vocals
- Anders Rundblad – bass, lead vocals (10), backing vocals
- Brian MacLeod – drums, breath

==== Additional musicians ====
- Peter Maunu – additional guitars and keyboards
- Peter Paul Skrepek – acoustic guitar (4)
- Ron MacLeod – digital sampling

=== Technical ===
- Produced by Peter Maunu
- Engineered by Ken Kessie
- Mastered by Greg Calbi at Sterling Sound (New York, NY)
- Remixed by Michael Frondeli (1, 2, 5)
- Production coordinator – Irma Maunu Kocian
- Cover design – Dodie Shoemaker
- Photography – Trudy Fisher
