= Disappearing World =

Disappearing World may refer to:

- Disappearing World (TV series), a 1970–1993 British documentary television series
- "Disappearing World" (Sheryl Crow song)
- Disappearing World, an album by Fair
