= Wire Train (album) =

Studio album by Wire Train
- Released: August 21, 1990
- Recorded: 1990
- Studio: Rumbo (Canoga Park)
- Genre: Rock
- Length: 52:48
- Label: MCA
- Producers: Don Smith, David Tickle

Wire Train chronology
Ten Women (1987)	Wire Train (1990)	No Soul No Strain (1992)

Wire Train is the fourth album by the American band Wire Train, released on August 21, 1990. David Fincher directed the video for "Should She Cry?" Wire Train supported the album by touring with Bob Dylan.

== Production ==
The album, which was delayed due to issues with Wire Train's former label, 415 Records, was produced by Don Smith and David Trickle. It was recorded live in the studio, in Los Angeles. The lyrics were written by Kevin Hunter. Benmont Tench, Susannah Melvoin, and Mike Campbell contributed to Wire Train.

== Critical reception ==
Professional ratings
Review scores
Source	Rating
AllMusic	3/5 stars
Calgary Herald	C
Chicago Tribune	3/4 stars
Entertainment Weekly	C
Rolling Stone	3.5/5 stars
Wisconsin State Journal	3.5/4 stars

Trouser Press noted that "the record's most striking song ('Should She Cry?', a catchy breath of pop air) owes no stylistic debt outside the band's own past." Entertainment Weekly determined that "a self-conscious dose of Dylanesque revelry is amusing in its way, but Wire Train‘s adventures into gospelly rock (in a Van Morrison-Stones vein) are less compelling." The San Diego Union-Tribune concluded that "the band members sound less like dedicated rockers and more like adroit studio musicians moving easily from one genre to another with a minimum of fuss or inspiration."

The New York Times stated that the songs "are immaculately crafted with ringing guitars, subtle drumming and airy, open spaces that lend a feeling of freedom and timelessness." The Calgary Herald deemed the band "mimics," writing that "when you're short of ideas, might just as well borrow from the best." Rolling Stone praised Wire Train's "knack for passionate, intelligent rock 'n' roll."

AllMusic wrote that "there are still a couple missteps, foremost among them being the absolutely atrocious 'Oh Me Oh My', the worst Bob Dylan parody since Simon & Garfunkel's 'A Simple Desultory Philippic' (or Knocked Out Loaded)."

== Track listing ==
All tracks are written by Kevin Hunter, Jeff Trott, Anders Rundblad, and Brian MacLeod.

No.	Title	Length
1.	"Spin"	4:17
2.	"Should She Cry?"	4:13
3.	"She"	4:11
4.	"If You See Her Go"	5:48
5.	"Dakota"	4:52
6.	"Moonlight Dream"	5:06
7.	"Simply Racing"	3:31
8.	"Precious Time"	2:51
9.	"Oh Me Oh My"	4:33
10.	"Tin Jesus"	9:10
11.	"All Night Living"	4:16
Total length:		52:48

== Personnel ==
Adapted from the album's liner notes.

Wire Train

- Kevin Hunter – lead vocals, guitar
- Jeff Trott – guitar, backing vocals
- Anders Rundblad – bass, backing vocals
- Brian MacLeod – drums, percussion

Additional musicians

- Benmont Tench – Hammond B3 organ, piano
- Kevin Gilbert – Hammond B3 organ (2)
- Peter Meyer – violin (3), drums (5)
- Louis Perez – percussion (5)
- Mike Campbell – hammer dulcimer (7)
- Durga McBroom – backing vocals (4, 8, 9)
- Susannah Melvoin – backing vocals (6–8)

Technical

- Produced by Don Smith and David Tickle
- Engineered by Gina Immel, Robert Salcedo, and Trigger Bob
- Mastered by Doug Sax at The Mastering Lab (Hollywood, CA)
- Art direction – Vartan
- Design – Kosh/Brooks Design
- Cover construction – Larry Brooks
- Cover photography – Stuart Wilson
- Group photography – Dennis Keeley
