= Detours (Sheryl Crow album) =

Studio album by Sheryl Crow
- Released: February 5, 2008
- Recorded: 2007
- Studios: The Hit Farm in Nashville, Odditorium Recorders in California, Sage and Sound Studios in Hollywood, Glenwood Place Studios in Burbank, The Pass Studios in Los Angeles, and 2 Seas Records in Bahrain
- Genres: Rock; pop rock; folk rock
- Length: 53:02 (US, 57:10 (UK)
- Label: A&M
- Producer: Bill Bottrell

Sheryl Crow chronology
Wildflower (2005)	Detours (2008)	Home for Christmas (2008)

Singles from Detours
- 1. "Shine over Babylon" Released: October 31, 2007; 2. "Love Is Free" Released: January 2008; 3. "Now That You're Gone" Released: April 2008; 4. "Out of Our Heads" Released: June 2008; 5. "Detours" Released: October 2008; 6. "Motivation" Released: November 2008

Detours is the sixth studio album by the American singer-songwriter Sheryl Crow, released on February 5, 2008. A return to Crow's forte in roots rock, the album also marks her reunion with Bill Bottrell, who produced her 1993 debut album, Tuesday Night Music Club, and briefly worked on her 1996 album, Sheryl Crow.

The album peaked at number two in the United States, becoming Crow's third consecutive album to do so, and sold over 700,000 copies worldwide up to 2010. It was nominated for a Grammy Award for Best Pop Vocal Album on December 4, 2008.

== Production ==
Detours was recorded at Crow's Nashville farm and includes 14 of the 24 songs recorded. The first single from the album, "Shine over Babylon", is a folk-rock anthem. Crow told Billboard in summer 2007 that the song "is very environmentally conscious, in the tradition of Bob Dylan". The single ended up being a radio-airplay release and reached #42 on the Italy Singles Chart and #4 on the Billboard Adult album alternative chart. Crow further stated:

"I'm really encouraging artists to write about what's going on, because we seem to be very distracted by some lightweight topics. I think it's time to start writing about the reality of what's around us."

In additional comments on her website, Crow describes the single as "in every way a desperate cry for understanding. Perhaps it is even a battle song in the face of fear."

In another statement, Crow described the record as "the most honest record I've ever made. It's about being forced to wake up".

The second single culled from the album was "Love Is Free", which, in Crow's own words, was "inspired by [the effect of Hurricane Katrina on] New Orleans. What struck me about it is the stoicism of the New Orleans people, they are very spiritually based. You can see it in their eyes that they aren't going to give up, they are going to rebuild." So far "Love Is Free" has gained much airplay in the United States and has already begun to enter the Billboard charts: the U.S. Hot 100 (#77), the Canadian Hot 100 (#53) and the Japanese Hot 100 (#10).

Perhaps coincidentally, while the New Orleans-inspired single was distributed and its allusions were noted by Crow during appearances on American television, the album itself was released on the day of the 2008 New Orleans Mardi Gras.

"Motivation" was released as a radio-single only and peaked at #14 on the Billboard Triple A chart in the US. The title track, "Detours", charted at #13 in the US after Crow performed it on the Ellen DeGeneres Show.

== Official videos ==
- "Shine over Babylon"
- "Lullaby for Wyatt"
- "Love Is Free"
- "God Bless This Mess"
- "Now That You're Gone"
- "Out of Our Heads"
- "Gasoline"

== Critical reception ==
Professional ratings
Aggregate scores
Source	Rating
Metacritic	75/100
Review scores
Source	Rating
AllMusic	4/5 stars
The A.V. Club	B
Blender	2.5/5 stars
Entertainment Weekly	A
Los Angeles Times	3.5/4 stars
musicOMH	3.5/5 stars
PopMatters	8/10
Rolling Stone	3.5/5 stars
Slant Magazine	4/5 stars
USA Today	3.5/4 stars

Detours scored a 75 on Metacritic, indicating "generally favorable" reviews.

Writing for Rolling Stone, Anthony Decurtis called it "a relatively stripped-down affair...What holds these fourteen songs together is Crow's unwavering emotional commitment. She confronts both personal and political terrors, and emerges hopeful — getting where she needs to go, despite the detours."

Stephen Thomas Erlewine writing for AllMusic called it "her liveliest, weirdest album since 1996's messy masterpiece Sheryl Crow...there is an emotional directness on Detours that makes this a progression, not a retreat, and with any luck, this album isn't a one-time journey down a side road but rather the touchstone for the next act in her career."

Sal Cinquemani of Slant Magazine wrote that "many of the songs on Detours rank among Crow’s best. There’s a grittiness to the music and a scratchy, lived-in quality to Crow’s vocals that’s been missing from her last couple of albums, and the rough edges are becoming...On their own, the political songs would render Detours Important, but Crow has managed the nearly impossible: recording an album that’s as intensely personal as it is fiercely political.

== Track listing ==
All lyrics and music by Sheryl Crow, except where noted

No.	Title	Length
1.	"God Bless This Mess"	2:09
2.	"Shine over Babylon" (lyrics: Crow, Bill Bottrell, music: Crow, Bottrell, Brian MacLeod, Eric Schermerhorn)	4:03
3.	"Love Is Free" (lyrics and music: Crow, Bottrell)	3:23
4.	"Peace Be Upon Us" (featuring Ahmed Al Hirmi) (music: Crow, Mike Elizondo, Bottrell, Jeff Trott)	4:22
5.	"Gasoline" (featuring Ben Harper) (music: Crow, Bottrell, Trott)	5:07
6.	"Out of Our Heads" (lyrics: Crow, Bottrell, music: Bottrell)	4:28
7.	"Detours"	3:29
8.	"Now That You're Gone"	3:51
9.	"Drunk with the Thought of You"	2:39
10.	"Diamond Ring" (music: Crow, Trott)	4:10
11.	"Motivation" (lyrics and music: Crow, Bottrell)	3:47
12.	"Make It Go Away (Radiation Song)"	3:24
13.	"Love Is All There Is" (music: Crow, Elizondo, Trott)	4:01
14.	"Lullaby for Wyatt"	4:09
Total length:		53:02

UK bonus tracks
No.	Title	Writer(s)	Length
15.	"Rise Up"	Crow, Bottrell	4:08
16.	"Here Comes the Sun" (iTunes bonus track)	George Harrison	3:00

US iTunes bonus tracks
No.	Title	Writer(s)	Length
15.	"Doctor My Eyes"	Jackson Browne	3:28
16.	"Here Comes the Sun" (Pre-order only)	Harrison	3:00

Japanese bonus tracks
No.	Title	Length
15.	"Rise Up" (lyrics and music: Crow, Bottrell)	4:08
16.	"Beautiful Dream"	3:36

Japanese Tour Edition bonus tracks
No.	Title	Length
15.	"Rise Up" (lyrics and music: Crow, Bottrell)	4:08
16.	"Beautiful Dream"	3:36
17.	"Shine over Babylon" (Live Acoustic version)	4:04
18.	"Detours" (Live Acoustic version)	3:41
19.	"Drunk with the Thought of You" (Live Acoustic version)	2:45
20.	"Love Is Free" (Live Acoustic version)	3:26

Japanese Tour Edition bonus DVD
No.	Title	Length
1.	"God Bless This Mess" (Music video)
2.	"Gasoline" (Music video)
3.	"Love Is Free" (Music video)
4.	"Shine over Babylon" (Music video)
5.	"Out of Our Heads" (Music video)

== Personnel ==
- Adrián Agustin – assistant engineer
- Ahmed AlHirmi – vocals
- Abdulla AlKhalifa – vocal arrangement, vocal producer
- Rosanna Arquette – vocals
- Catherine Berclaz – art direction, creative director
- Bill Bottrell – organ, synthesizer, acoustic guitar, bass guitar, percussion, pedal steel, drums, electric guitar, marimba, pipe, vocals, choir, chorus, producer, engineer, mellotron, acoustic bass, string arrangements, drum programming, mixing, synthesizer bass, wurlitzer
- Doyle Bramhall II – electric guitar
- Teresa Bustillo – assistant
- Matt Butler – cello
- Sheryl Crow – organ, acoustic guitar, bass guitar, piano, accordion, vocals, choir, chorus, handclapping
- Wyatt Crow – noise
- Greg d'Augelli – brass
- Brendan Dekora – assistant engineer
- Mike Elizondo – synthesizer, acoustic guitar, bass guitar, drums, sampling, drum programming
- Eric Fritsch – engineer
- Ben Harper – vocals
- Chris Hudson – production coordination
- Brian MacLeod – percussion, drums, sampling, drum programming
- Alex Pavlides – assistant engineer
- Julian Peploe – art direction, package design
- Mike Rowe – flute sample
- Norman Jean Roy – photography
- Doug Sax – mastering
- Marva Soogrim – vocals
- Zeph Sowers – assistant engineer
- Jeremy Stacey – piano, drums, timbales, vocals, kalimba
- Shari Sutcliffe – contractor
- Matt Tait – engineer
- Ken Takahashi – assistant engineer
- Jeff Trott – acoustic guitar, bass guitar, electric guitar, vocals, choir, chorus, slide guitar
- Scooter Weintraub – management
- Pam Wertheimer – management
- David Allen Young – assistant engineer

== Release history and chart performance ==
Detours debuted at number two on the U.S. Billboard 200 chart, selling about 92,000 copies in its first week and an additional 52,000 copies in its second week. As of May 26, 2010, the album had sold 405,000 copies in the US.

== Charts ==
Chart performance for Detours
Chart (2008)	Peak position
Austrian Albums (Ö3 Austria)	32
Belgian Albums (Ultratop Flanders)	79
Belgian Albums (Ultratop Wallonia)	79
German Albums (Offizielle Top 100)	18
Scottish Albums (Official Charts)	20
Swiss Albums (Schweizer Hitparade)	14
UK Albums (Official Charts)	20
US Billboard 200	2
Japanese Albums (Oricon)	22
Canadian Albums (Billboard)	2
Australia (ARIA)	111
France (SNEP)	78
Netherlands (MegaCharts)	36
Sweden (Sverigetopplistan)	27
Italian Albums (FIMI)	66

=== Year-end charts ===
Chart (2008)	Peak position
Billboard 200	114
Top Alternative Albums	22
Top Comprehensive Albums	125

== Certifications ==
Region	Certification	Certified units/sales
Canada (Music Canada)	Gold	50,000^{^}
^{^} Shipments figures based on certification alone.
