= No Time Like Now (disambiguation) =

No Time Like Now is a 1983 album by Translator. The phrase may also refer to:

- "No Time Like Now", the title song to the Translator album
- "No Time Like Now", a song from Confidence (Gentleman album)
- "No Time Like Now", a song from Awake (Illenium album)
