= Evening of the Harvest =

Album by Translator

Studio album by Translator
- Released: 1986
- Label: 415/Columbia
- Producer: Ed Stasium

Translator chronology
Translator (1985)	Evening of the Harvest (1986)	Everywhere That I'm Not: A Retrospective (1986)

Evening of the Harvest is the fourth album by Translator, released in 1986 on 415 Records, and distributed by Columbia Records.

In 2007, the album was released on CD for the first time by Wounded Bird Records. The CD release included 2 songs from a single as bonus tracks.

In a 2007 review in Record Collector, Tony Sclafani wrote that Translator "turned their amps up to 11" in a "muscular" style that "predicted grunge", because they were frustrated with "audience indifference" to their previous albums. He described Evening of the Harvest as having "replaced [the band's] Beatles leanings with influences ranging from Neil Young to raga rock."

== Track listing ==
1. "Standing in Line"
2. "These Old Days"
3. "Crazier Everyday"
4. "I Need You to Love"
5. "Is There a Heaven Singing"
6. "Winter Crying"
7. "Stony Gates of Time"
8. "Complications"
9. "Point of No Return"
10. "Tolling of the Bells"
11. "Evening of the Harvest"

2007 CD bonus tracks

1. "Today" (single)
2. "Ronnie Raygun Blues" (b-side)
