= Ten Women =

Studio album by Wire Train
- Released: March 19, 1987
- Recorded: October–November 1986
- Studios: Marcus (London); Jam (London); Utopia (London)
- Genre: Rock
- Length: 38:11
- Label: 415/Columbia
- Producer: Tim Palmer

Wire Train chronology
Between Two Words (1985)	Ten Women (1987)	Wire Train (1990)

Ten Women is an album by the American band Wire Train, released on March 19, 1987. The first single was "She Comes On". The band supported the album with North American and European tours.

== Production ==
Recorded over three months in London, the album was produced by Tim Palmer. Guitarist Jeffrey Trott replaced Kurt Herr prior to the recording sessions. The lyrics were written by singer Kevin Hunter. The Alarm's Dave Sharp played guitar on "Breakwater Days", the lyrics to which were inspired by Bob Dylan. Members of World Party and the Waterboys also contributed to the recording sessions.

== Critical reception ==
Professional ratings
Review scores
Source	Rating
AllMusic	2.5/5 stars
Houston Chronicle	4/5 stars
Windsor Star	B−

The Windsor Star praised the "piledriving, blues-rock sound," writing that "the group has tightened up the loose ends of its earlier efforts for a strong record." The Richmond Times-Dispatch called Ten Women "one of the best rock `n' roll albums of the year to date," writing that "Hunter is a passionate vocalist who avoids false sentimentality with his romantic lyrics." Trouser Press noted that, "while the crystalline pop production and Hunter's sandy voice give the record a familiar patina, the slower-paced songs are pretty but routine."

The Houston Chronicle said that "haunting vocals, crisp rock-steady rhythms and delicate guitar work power these cagey melodies." The Omaha World-Herald concluded that the "lack of pretentiousness would doom a lesser band to the bland heap, but it makes Wire Train all the more accessible and enjoyable." The Commercial Appeal opined that, "though Hunter's ephemeral lyrics aren't for every taste, the band's music is too charming to turn from."

AllMusic wrote that "the magic of the band's original sound, a sort of Neil Young-meets-the-Paisley Underground gloss on early-'80s jangle pop, is largely missing here."

== Track listing ==
All tracks are written by Kevin Hunter, Jeff Trott, Anders Rundblad, and Brian MacLeod.

Side one
No.	Title	Length
1.	"She Comes On"	3:28
2.	"Take Me Back"	3:33
3.	"Diving"	4:15
4.	"She's a Very Pretty Thing"	2:47
5.	"Breakwater Days"	5:08

Side two
No.	Title	Length
1.	"She's Got You"	3:04
2.	"Mercy Mercy"	4:34
3.	"Certainly No One"	3:33
4.	"The Hollow Song"	3:30
5.	"Too Long Alone"	4:19
Total length:		38:11

Bonus tracks
No.	Title	Length
11.	"Compassion" (B-side; with the Waterboys)	5:28
12.	"Flowers" (Outtake; Released on Last Perfect Thing... A Retrospective)	3:43
Total length:		47:22

"Compassion" was included as track 10 on the UK LP (which removed "The Hollow Song" as track 9)

== Personnel ==
Adapted from the album's liner notes.

Wire Train

- Kevin Hunter – lead vocals, guitar
- Jeff Trott – guitar, backing vocals
- Anders Rundblad – bass, harmonica, backing vocals
- Brian MacLeod – drums, percussion

Additional musicians

- Olle Nyberg – keyboards
- Martin Ditcham – percussion
- Dave Sharp – guitar (5)

Technical

- Produced by Tim Palmer
- Mixed by Tim Palmer and Simon Vinestock
- Assistant engineers – Damien Asher, Mark Boyne, and Tim Burrell
- Mastered by Greg Calbi at Sterling Sound (New York, NY)
- Art direction and design – Dodie Shoemaker
- Cover photography – Trudy Fisher
- Inner sleeve photography – Randee St. Nicholas
