= Easy (Sheryl Crow song) =

2013 single by Sheryl Crow

Single by Sheryl Crow

from the album Feels Like Home
- Released: March 12, 2013
- Studio: Ocean Way Studios (Nashville, TN)
- Genre: Country
- Length: 4:10 (album version); 3:42 (radio edit)
- Label: Warner Music Nashville
- Songwriters: Sheryl Crow; Chris DuBois; Jeff Trott
- Producers: Sheryl Crow; Justin Niebank

Sheryl Crow singles chronology
"Coal Miner's Daughter" (2010)	"Easy" (2013)	"Callin' Me When I'm Lonely" (2013)

Music video
- "Sheryl Crow - Easy (Official Music Video)" on YouTube

"Easy" is a song by American singer-songwriter Sheryl Crow recorded for her ninth studio album, Feels Like Home (2013). The song, announced as the lead single, made its airplay debut on February 21, 2013, and was released on March 12. The song is her first release through Warner Music Nashville.

== Background and composition ==
In an interview, Crow described the single as her "staycation (staying home) song" and stated it was about "making your home feel like you're getting away" as opposed to vacationing in exotic places.

== Critical reception ==
The song has received positive reviews from most critics. Jim Beviglia from American Songwriter gave the song a positive review, describing Crow's performance as "inviting", but at the same time stated that the song was in her "comfort zone". Billy Dukes from Taste of Country gave the track 3 and a half stars out of 5, commenting: "It’s easy to be seduced by Crow’s carefree warmth and laid-back style. It’s easy to overlook the effective songwriting, and it’s easy to fall into her story again and again." Ben Foster gave the song a "B" rating and wrote for Country Universe that "Crow’s delivery of the chorus conveys a subtle sense of excitement that quietly pulls the listener in, lending an organic feel to the track as a whole". Bobby Peacock from Roughstock.com praised the song's lyrics and wrote: "The song is a smooth listen, but executed strongly enough to be more than just ear candy", giving the song 3 and a half stars out of 5. A less favorable review came from Bob Paxman of Country Weekly, who gave the song a "C+" and said that "Sheryl delivers it with joy and a bit of playful, sexual overtone, but there's nothing extraordinary about the song."

== Track listing ==
Digital download
No.	Title	Writer(s)	Length
1.	"Easy"	Sheryl Crow, Chris DuBois, Jeff Trot	4:10

== Music video ==
The music video was directed by Trey Fanjoy and made its worldwide premiere on CMT.com on May 4, 2013.

== Promotion ==
The track made its debut on January 24, 2013, when Crow performed it on the late-night talk show Jimmy Kimmel Live!. She also performed the single on Good Morning America, The Late Show with David Letterman and the reality show The Voice, along with contestants Holly Tucker, Danielle Bradberry and The Swon Brothers. Crow performed the song at the 2013 Country Music Association Festival. While promoting the album in the United Kingdom, Crow performed the track on The Graham Norton Show, BBC Breakfast and Sunday Brunch.

== Chart performance ==
"Easy" debuted at number 58 on the Billboard Country Airplay chart for the week of February 25, 2013. The song opened at number 43 on the Hot Country Songs chart and also debuted at number 37 on Country Digital Songs, peaking at number 9 and racking up over 360,000 downloads in the United States as of October 2013. On the Hot 100, "Easy" debuted at number 99 for the week of July 20, 2013, making it Crow's first appearance on the chart since 2010. In the UK, the song was A-listed on BBC Radio 2 for the week commencing January 4, 2014, and debuted at number 80 on the Official Singles Chart.

Chart (2013–2014)	Peak position
Belgium (Ultratip Flanders)	55
Japan Hot 100 (Billboard)	45
Canada Country (Billboard)	49
UK Singles (OCC)	80
UK Airplay (OCC)	39
US Billboard Hot 100	72
US Country Airplay (Billboard)	17
US Hot Country Songs (Billboard)	21

=== Year-end charts ===
Chart (2013)	Position
US Country Airplay (Billboard)	59
US Hot Country Songs (Billboard)	67
