= Pearl Harbor and the Explosions (album) =

Studio album by Pearl Harbor and the Explosions
- Released: December 1979/January 1980
- Studio: The Automatt, San Francisco
- Genre: Dance-rock
- Label: Warner Bros
- Producer: David Kahne

Alternative UK cover

Professional ratings
Review scores
Source	Rating
AllMusic	2/5 stars
Christgau's Record Guide	B+

Pearl Harbor and the Explosions is the only studio album by the American band Pearl Harbor and the Explosions.

== Release and reception ==
The album was released by Warner Bros. Records. Its release date has been reported as 1979 by Robert Christgau, December 1979 by AllMusic, and January 26, 1980, by Joel Whitburn.

Reviewing the LP in Christgau's Record Guide: Rock Albums of the Seventies (1981), Christgau said, "A rhythm band ought to have a better rhythm section—most of this rocks OK for DOR, but the funk beneath 'Get a Grip on Yourself,' for instance, is stiff to no purpose. The riffs are hooky, though, and Pearl E. Gates is an independent—not to say insular—woman who knows what her habits cost. There are no tears on her pillow and she doesn't care if your aim is true, but she doesn't waste her energy on macha bluster, either—prefers the cutting remark and isn't above turning her wit on herself. Which does not mean she has any intention of 'reforming.'"

== Remaster ==
The band's sole album was reissued by Blixa Sounds on 12 April 2019 remastered by Bill Inglot and Dave Schulz. The reissue included seven bonus tracks including three live performances recorded in San Francisco. The reissue also included the original single version of two tracks issued by 415 Records prior to the group signing with Columbia.

== Track listing ==
All tracks composed by Pearl Harbor and the Explosions (Hilary Stench, John Stench, Pearl E. Gates, Peter Bilt); "Up and Over" by Pearl Harbor and the Explosions and David Kahne

1. "Drivin'" 4:34
2. "You Got It (Release It)" 2:29
3. "Don't Come Back" 3:30
4. "Keep Going" 3:21
5. "Shut Up and Dance" 4:00
6. "The Big One" 4:06
7. "So Much for Love" 3:01
8. "Get a Grip on Yourself" 3:30
9. "Up and Over" 5:51

== Reissue bonus tracks (April 2019 reissue) ==
1. "Busy Little B-Side" (Non LP B-side)
2. "Drivin'" (415 Single Version)
3. "Release It" (415 Single Version)
4. "Let's Eat" (Live 1979)
5. "Black Slacks" (Live 1979)
6. "I Can Feel the Fire"(Live 1979)
7. 1979 Radio Spot

== Personnel ==
Pearl Harbor and the Explosions

- Pearl E. Gates - vocals, percussion
- Peter Bilt - guitar, vocals
- Hilary Stench - bass, vocals
- John Stench - drums, percussion

== Production ==
- Produced by: David Kahne
- Engineered by: Jim Gaines
- Assistant Engineers: Ken Kessie & Wayne Lewis
- Recorded at: The Automatt, San Francisco
- Mastered by: John Golden (Kendun Recorders)
- Management: Larry Robbins (One 8 Management)
- Photography by: Michael Jang
- Cover Designed by: Basil Pao
