= Shotgun (Sheryl Crow song) =

Single by Sheryl Crow

from the album Feels Like Home
- Released: June 2, 2014
- Genre: Country
- Length: 3:15
- Label: Warner Bros. Nashville
- Songwriters: Sheryl Crow; Chris DuBois; Kelley Lovelace; John Shanks
- Producers: Sheryl Crow; Justin Niebank

Sheryl Crow singles chronology
"Callin' Me When I'm Lonely" (2013)	"Shotgun" (2014)	"Halfway There" (2017)

Audio video
- "Sheryl Crow - "Shotgun" OFFICIAL AUDIO" on YouTube

"Shotgun" is a song recorded by American singer-songwriter Sheryl Crow. It was released on June 2, 2014 as the third single from her eighth studio album, Feels Like Home. The song was written by Crow, Chris DuBois, Kelley Lovelace and John Shanks.

== Content ==
Crow states that the inspiration for the song came from one of her father's sayings. "My dad always said, ‘Drive it like it’s stolen, and park it like it’s rented.’ And I thought, that’s how you have to live life. So I’ve always wanted to write a song with that idea in it".

== Critical reception ==
The song has received positive reviews. Chuck Dauphin of Billboard wrote that the track "showcases the 'bad ass' side of the singer in the same vein as such classic fare as 'Steve McQueen'", while Tara Toro from Got Country Online praised its "instantly catchy melody", stating that the song "shows Sheryl's versatility from her two previous singles", giving it four stars out of five. A mixed review came from Kevin John Coyne from Country Universe, who gave the song a "C" rating and wrote that the single "sounds like it could be an outtake" from her 1996 eponymous album, stating that "her songwriting is as tepid as ever, with a radio single from 2014 that wouldn’t have been good enough to make the actual album eighteen years ago."

== Chart performance ==
"Shotgun" debuted at number 53 on the Billboard Country Airplay chart for the week of June 14, 2014.

Chart (2014)	Peak position
US Country Airplay (Billboard)	51
