= Feels like Home (Sheryl Crow album) =

Studio album by Sheryl Crow
- Released: September 10, 2013
- Recorded: 2012–2013
- Studios: Blackbird (Nashville, Tennessee); Ocean Way (Nashville, Tennessee); Big Green Barn (Nashville, Tennessee)
- Genre: Country
- Length: 44:10
- Labels: Old Green Barn; Sea Gayle Music; Warner Bros. Nashville
- Producers: Sheryl Crow; Justin Niebank

Sheryl Crow chronology
100 Miles from Memphis (2010)	Feels like Home (2013)	Be Myself (2017)

Singles from Feels like Home
- 1. "Easy" Released: March 12, 2013; 2. "Callin' Me When I'm Lonely" Released: October 28, 2013; 3. "Shotgun" Released: June 2, 2014

Feels like Home is the ninth studio album by American singer-songwriter Sheryl Crow, released in the US and Japan on September 10, 2013, in Europe on September 13, and in the UK on January 27, 2014. The album is Crow's debut country music record and also is her first release through Warner Bros. Records. The album was recorded in Nashville, Tennessee and was produced by Crow and Justin Niebank. The album was ranked by Billboard as one of the ten best country albums of 2013.

== Background ==
In an interview for Billboard magazine in 2008, Crow revealed she was becoming part of the Nashville community (after moving there from Los Angeles in 2006 following a breast cancer diagnosis) and explained that she, among other artists that were “just singer/songwriters”, was gradually gravitating to the country music format due to the fact that there was “no room” between dance-oriented pop, rap and country music. Although she didn’t consider herself an artist from the latter genre, she also added: “I feel like my music kind of stems from this part of the world. There’s a very strong tie to Americana and lyrically to troubadour/country kinds of music, but in the tradition of old country. I couldn’t begin to understand how to make a new country record. I don’t even know what that is now. But I would love to make a straight up old country record, which would probably never get played.”

Having worked with country artists such as Vince Gill, Emmylou Harris, Brooks & Dunn, Dwight Yoakam and Dixie Chicks, and also released renditions of classic songs from the genre like The Carter Family’s "No Depression in Heaven" (which charted number 55 on Billboard’s Hot Country Songs chart) and Hank Williams’ "Long Gone Lonesome Blues", for which she received a Best Female Country Vocal Performance Grammy nomination in 2002, Crow has contributed to country music over the years.

After releasing her last album through A&M Records in 2010 (Crow was later dropped from the label in 2011), the singer received an invitation to record the Loretta Lynn song "Coal Miner’s Daughter" along with Miranda Lambert and Lynn herself. After the trio’s performance at the CMA Awards, it was Nashville neighbor Brad Paisley the one who gave Crow the suggestion of “coming home” to the format he believed she belonged to. According to Paisley, had Crow’s early efforts been released today, they would belong to country radio.

Crow was convinced, although she did have doubts about the reception her "crossover" would generate. She recalls: “I’ve seen other kind of pop-oriented people come over to the format and kinda try to capitalize on the loyalty of the country fan base, and I’m super-persnickety about it.”, but considering the directions pop/rock and country music had shifted to in the past decade, it seemed like a natural transition for Crow, whose career has already spanned 20 years.

== Songwriting ==
Writing for the album began with some helpful advice from Brad Paisley. "He’d say 'Let’s just do what you do. Bring your influences with you. Just turn your vocal up and make your stories a little more concise and you’re already there.'", Crow recalls. After a writing session with Paisley and consequently being introduced to Nashville-based songwriter Chris DuBois, the first song, entitled "Waterproof Mascara" was finished. Gradually, Crow was introduced to other Nashville songwriters, including Chris Stapleton, Luke Laird and Natalie Hemby, and along with long-time collaborator Jeff Trott, co-wrote ten of the album’s 12 songs. This experience was a first for the veteran artist, who, after 25 years of songwriting, was an apprentice again. Crow described the process as very focused due to the fact that there was a bigger importance given to writing about subjects and themes she was the closest to. "It was a little bit like stepping on the court with Roger Federer and you're not that good, but I loved the process...I feel like the best material I've ever written is on this record. And I feel like I'm still learning.", Crow stated in an interview for The Toronto Sun.

== Critical reception ==
Professional ratings
Aggregate scores
Source	Rating
Metacritic	74/100
Review scores
Source	Rating
Allmusic	3/5 stars
American Songwriter	3.5/5 stars
Billboard	92/100
Country Standard Time	Favorable
Exclaim!	7/10
The Montreal Gazette	2.5/5 stars
New York Daily News	3/5 stars
Great American Country	Very favorable
Music Is My Oxygen	4/5 stars
The Oakland Press	3/4 stars
Rolling Stone	3.5/5 stars
Roughstock	4/5 stars
The Daily Telegraph	4/5 stars

Feels like Home garnered generally positive reception from music critics. At Metacritic the album has a Metascore of a 76 based on seven reviews. At Rolling Stone, Will Hermes felt that "The results are uneven, but never feel forced or faked", so "this set suggests the Opry crowd might want to keep her on speed dial." Stephen Thomas Erlewine at Allmusic stated that the release "feels like standard-issue Crow", and that the album was "show biz panache, how Crow cheerfully adapts to her surroundings and gives the people what she believes they want." At American Songwriter, Jim Beviglia told that "Feels Like Home goes astray only at the times when it seems like it’s too eager to court hard-core country fans", about which he noted that the album has an "appropriate title", and found that "the evidence on the disc suggests that this was a natural progression for Crow’s music rather than a mercenary one." In a positive review, Sarah Rodman of The Boston Globe affirmed that the release "feels natural."

At The Oakland Press, Gary Graff highlighted that "The change certainly fits like a proverbial glove for Crow; her own singer-songwriter sensibilities have long embraced the image-rich, storytelling conventions of country music". Jason Schneider of Exclaim! noted that "The image of country music has changed a great deal as well, and while it's easy to say that Feels Like Home is Crow selling out to the new Nashville, even a cursory listen suggests the opposite: that Nashville has conformed to what Crow was doing all along." In addition, Schneider told that "on the surface Feels Like Home is a makeover aimed at the parents of every Taylor Swift fan, but the essence of Crow's sound remains intact, and irresistible." At Roughstock, Matt Bjorke wrote that "If Feels Like Home proves anything it's that she's genuinely making the move to Country and that's all that the gatekeepers at radio and longtime fans of the genre want out of their artists, a commitment to making great music and Feels Like Home is definitely that." Rob Burkhardt at Music Is My Oxygen highlighted that the album "feels like she's come home".

In the UK, the album was Album of the Week on BBC Radio 2 for the week commencing January 25, 2014.

== Chart performance ==
Feels like Home entered the Billboard 200 chart at number seven, with 37,000 copies sold, as Crow's ninth top ten album in the US. The album also became her first entry on the Top Country Albums chart, debuting at number 3. Internationally, the album underperformed, compared to the singer's previous release, 100 Miles from Memphis, peaking at number 16 in Canada where it spent one week on the chart, number 60 in Switzerland and barely making it to the top 100 in the Netherlands, where it charted at number 92. However, in the United Kingdom, the album became Crow's highest charting effort since 2003, debuting at number 16 with sales of 5,500 on the Official UK Chart and becoming the singer's seventh top twenty album.

== Track listing ==
No.	Title	Writer(s)	Length
1.	"Shotgun"	Sheryl Crow; Chris DuBois; Kelley Lovelace; John Shanks	3:13
2.	"Easy"	Crow; DuBois; Jeff Trott	4:10
3.	"Give It to Me" (featuring Vince Gill and Ashley Monroe)	Crow; Trott	3:57
4.	"We Oughta Be Drinkin'"	Crow; DuBois; Luke Laird	3:52
5.	"Callin' Me When I'm Lonely"	Rodney Clawson; Brent Anderson	3:25
6.	"Waterproof Mascara"	Crow; DuBois; Brad Paisley	3:32
7.	"Crazy Ain't Original"	Crow; Al Anderson; Leslie Satcher	3:17
8.	"Nobody's Business"	Crow; DuBois; Lovelace	3:34
9.	"Homesick" (featuring Zac Brown)	Crow; Chris Stapleton	4:05
10.	"Homecoming Queen"	Brandy Clark; Laird; Shane McAnally	3:24
11.	"Best of Times"	Crow; Anderson; Satcher	3:19
12.	"Stay at Home Mother"	Crow; Natalie Hemby	4:09
Total length:			44:02

Deluxe edition bonus tracks (iTunes, Target)
No.	Title	Writer(s)	Length
13.	"This Is You (That Was Then)"	Crow; Jon Randall; Jessi Alexander	3:49
14.	"You're Asking the Wrong Person"	Crow; DuBois; Lee Thomas Miller	3:32
Total length:			51:23

== Personnel ==
- Sheryl Crow – vocals, acoustic guitar, background vocals, whistling on "We Oughta Be Drinkin'"
- Samuel Bacco – vibraphone
- Richard Bennett – electric guitar
- Tom Bukovac – electric guitar
- Perry Coleman – vocals
- J.T. Corenflos – electric guitar
- Eric Darken – percussion
- David Davidson – violin
- Dan Dugmore – pedal steel
- Chris Farrell – viola
- Paul Franklin – pedal steel
- Tania Hancheroff – background vocals
- Tony Harrell – keyboards
- Aubrey Haynie – fiddle, mandolin
- Wes Hightower – background vocals
- Jim Hoke – harmonica
- Jedd Hughes – electric guitar
- Charlie Judge – accordion, keyboards, string arrangements
- Anthony LaMarchina – cello
- Ashley Monroe – background vocals
- Greg Morrow – drums
- Brad Paisley – slide guitar
- Sarighani Reist – cello
- Pamela Sixfin – violin
- Ilya Toshinsky – dobro, mandolin
- Jeff Trott – acoustic guitar, electric guitar, lap steel
- Wei Tsun Chang – violin
- Karen Winkelmann – violin
- Glenn Worf – bass

== Charts ==
=== Weekly charts ===
Chart (2013/2014)	Peak position
Australian Country Albums (ARIA)	14
Belgian Albums (Ultratop Flanders)	101
Belgian Albums (Ultratop Wallonia)	90
Canadian Albums (Billboard)	16
Dutch Albums (Album Top 100)	92
French Albums (SNEP)	145
Hungarian Albums (MAHASZ)	4
Irish Albums (IRMA)	47
Japanese Albums (Oricon)	63
Scottish Albums (Official Charts)	12
Swiss Albums (Schweizer Hitparade)	60
UK Albums (Official Charts)	16
UK Album Downloads (Official Charts)	30
UK Country Albums (Official Charts)	1
UK Country Albums Chart (OCC)	1
US Billboard 200	7
US Top Current Album Sales (Billboard)	7
US Digital Albums (Billboard)	10
US Top Country Albums (Billboard)	3
US Indie Store Album Sales (Billboard)	19

=== Year-end charts ===
Chart (2013)	Position
US Top Country Albums (Billboard)	51
