= No Time Like Now =

Studio album by Translator
- Released: Aug 1983
- Label: 415/Columbia
- Producer: David Kahne

Translator chronology
Heartbeats And Triggers (1982)	No Time Like Now (1983)	Break Down Barriers EP (1983)

Professional ratings
Review scores
Source	Rating
Allmusic	2.5/5 stars

No Time Like Now is the second album from Translator, released in August 1983 on 415 Records and distributed by Columbia Records.

In 2007 the album was released on CD for the first time by Wounded Bird Records. The CD release included the 3 songs from the Break Down Barriers EP as bonus tracks.

== Track listing ==
1. "Un-Alone"
2. "Beyond Today"
3. "I Hear You Follow"
4. "Break Down Barriers"
5. "L.A., L.A."
6. "I Love You"
7. "No Time Like Now"
8. "Everything Is Falling"
9. "Simple Things"
10. "The End of Their Love "
11. "About the Truth"
12. "Circumstance Laughing"

2007 CD bonus tracks

13. "Eraser"
14. "Cry for a Shadow"
15. "Break Down Barriers" (Extended Mix)
