= The Nuns (album) =

Studio album by The Nuns
- Released: 1980
- Genres: New wave; punk rock
- Label: Bomp!
- Producers: The Nuns; Robbie Fields

The Nuns is the debut studio album by American rock band The Nuns, released in 1980 by record label Bomp!.

== Reception ==
Professional ratings
Review scores
Source	Rating
AllMusic	3/5 stars
Trouser Press	favourable

AllMusic called it "a minor classic of the late-'70s punk era".

== Track listing ==
No.	Title	Writer(s)	Length
1.	"Savage"	Jennifer Miro	2:12
2.	"Media Control"	Alejandro Escovedo, Jeff Olener, Richie Detrick	2:31
3.	"World War III"	Escovedo, Olener, Detrick	2:41
4.	"You Think You're the Best"	Miro	2:05
5.	"Walkin' the Beat"	Escovedo, Olener, Detrick	2:52
6.	"Wild"	Miro	2:00
7.	"Getting Straight"	Escovedo, Olener, Detrick	2:02
8.	"Confused"	Escovedo, Olener, Detrick	1:15
9.	"Child Molester"	Escovedo, Olener	2:03
10.	"Suicide Child"	Escovedo, Olener	4:15
11.	"Lazy"	Miro	2:29

== Personnel ==
The Nuns

- Jeff Olener – vocals
- Richie Dietrick – vocals
- Jennifer Miro – vocals, keyboards, piano
- Alejandro Escovedo – guitar
- Pat Ryan – bass guitar
- Jeff Raphael – drums, percussion

Production

- The Nuns – producer
- Robbie Fields – producer
- Glenn Feit – recording engineer
- David Hines – mixing
- Stan Ross – mastering
