= No Soul No Strain =

Studio album by Wire Train
- Released: 1992
- Recorded: Toad Hall, Pasadena, California
- Genre: Rock
- Label: MCA
- Producer: Bill Bottrell

Wire Train chronology
Wire Train (1990)	No Soul No Strain (1992)	Last Perfect Thing... A Retrospective (1996)

No Soul No Strain is the fifth album by the American band Wire Train, released in 1992.

The first single was "Stone Me". The band supported the album by touring with Live, among others.

== Production ==
The album was produced by Bill Bottrell. Wire Train started work on the tracks in a cabin close to Yosemite National Park, and finished them in Bottrell's Toad Hall recording studio.

== Critical reception ==
Professional ratings
Review scores
Source	Rating
AllMusic	2.5/5 stars
Chicago Tribune	3/4 stars
The State	4/5 stars

The Chicago Tribune wrote: "Wire Train sounds too much like too many other modern rock outfits to be cited for iconoclastic genius and originality, but the California quartet does an exceptional job of delivering a variety of immediately accessible, funky pop hooks with a minimum of dull filler." Miami New Times deemed the album "delightfully casual and smartly cool real rock."

The State praised the "chunkier guitars and complex rhythms," writing that "this is Wire Train's most ambitious work to date." The Capital Times opined that "the wittiness of the lyrics ('Jesus and Mohammed were just a couple of regular guys who made a lot of good friends after they died') is supported by consistently compelling music."

== Track listing ==
All tracks are written by Kevin Hunter, Jeff Trott, Anders Rundblad, and Brian MacLeod except where noted.

No.	Title	Writer(s)	Length
1.	"Stone Me"		4:40
2.	"Open Sky"		4:03
3.	"Yeah Yeah Yeah"		5:43
4.	"Crashing Back to You"		4:52
5.	"Hey Jordan"		4:41
6.	"Other Lover"	Hunter, Trott	2:57
7.	"How Many More Times"		3:35
8.	"Willing It to Be"	Hunter	3:41
9.	"Higher"		3:25
10.	"Impossible"	Hunter	2:37
11.	"When I Met You"	Hunter, Trott	3:26
12.	"17 Spooks"		4:57
Total length:			48:37

== Personnel ==
Credits are adapted from the album's liner notes.

- Kevin Hunter – vocals
- Jeff Trott – guitar
- Anders Rundblad – bass
- Brian MacLeod – drums

Production

- Produced by Bill Bottrell
- Engineer – Bob Salcedo
- Assistant Engineers – Blair Lamb & Lotti Kierkegaard
- Mixed by Bill Bottrell & Bob Salcedo
- Mastered by Steve Hall
