= Callin' Me When I'm Lonely =

2013 single by Sheryl Crow

Single by Sheryl Crow

from the album Feels Like Home
- Released: October 28, 2013
- Studio: Ocean Way Nashville (Nashville, TN); Blackbird Studio (Nashville, TN)
- Genre: Country
- Length: 3:25
- Label: Warner Music Nashville
- Songwriters: Rodney Clawson; Brent Anderson
- Producers: Sheryl Crow; Justin Niebank

Sheryl Crow singles chronology
"Easy" (2013)	"Callin' Me When I'm Lonely" (2013)	"Shotgun" (2014)

Audio video
- "Sheryl Crow - "Callin' Me When I'm Lonely" OFFICIAL AUDIO" on YouTube

"Callin' Me When I'm Lonely" is a song recorded by American singer-songwriter Sheryl Crow. It was released as the second single from her 2013 album, Feels Like Home. The song was written by Nashville songwriters Rodney Clawson and Brent Anderson, and one of the two tracks on the album that Crow did not have a hand in writing.

== Critical reception ==
The song has received positive reviews from music critics. The song was Taste of Country's Critic's Pick for October 13, 2013 and was praised by critic Billy Dukes, who compared the song to Lady Antebellum's "Need You Now", writing that "(you) have to listen a few times to realize you don't miss the heavy-handed production that sensationalizes and sexualizes similar efforts. It's just a woman singing what's in her heart, pure and simple." Tara Toro from Got Country Online gave the song 4 stars out of 5, writing: "Sheryl's voice conveys the feelings of loneliness and vulnerability believably", also stating that "this song (and album) should assist her in becoming a mainstay in the genre". Enio Chiola from Pop Matters wrote that "It's so freakin' catchy and rings out with a home-hitting familiarity that you can't help but think: Why does he always gotta be callin' me when I'm lonely?".

== Promotion ==
Crow performed the song for the first time on the late night talk show Late Night with Jimmy Fallon. She also performed the song on Katie, Live! with Kelly and Michael and Country Music Television's Hot 20 Countdown.

== Music video ==
On April 29, 2014, Crow premiered the music video for the single on People.com. The video consists of her performing the song live on her Free and Easy Tour.

== Chart performance ==
The single debuted at number 52 on the Billboard Country Airplay chart for the week of November 16, 2013.

Chart (2013–2014)	Peak position
US Country Airplay (Billboard)	26
US Hot Country Songs (Billboard)	37
