= Love Is Free =

Single by Sheryl Crow

from the album Detours
- Released: January 2008
- Length: 3:23
- Label: A&M
- Songwriters: Sheryl Crow, Bill Bottrell
- Producer: Bill Bottrell

Sheryl Crow singles chronology
"Shine over Babylon" (2007)	"Love Is Free" (2008)	"Now That You're Gone" (2008)

Music video
- "Sheryl Crow - Love Is Free" on YouTube

"Love Is Free" is a song written and recorded by American singer-songwriter Sheryl Crow. It was released as the second single from Crow's sixth studio album Detours. Its predecessor song, "Shine over Babylon", was for airplay only.

On her website, Crow states that she was inspired by the floods in New Orleans. "What struck me about it is the stoicism of the New Orleans people, they are very spiritually based. You can see it in their eyes that they aren't going to give up, they are going to rebuild."

== Music video ==
The music video shows Crow singing with an acoustic guitar in a boat while coming across all kinds of characters. It was directed by The Malloys.

The video for "Love Is Free" was added to the popular video-sharing site YouTube on 17 January 2008 and has had over 1,000,000 views.

== Track listing ==
Maxi CD

1. "Love Is Free" (Album Version) - 3:23
2. "Drunk With the Thought of You" (Live Acoustic Version) - 2:46
3. "Shine Over Babylon" (Live Acoustic Version) - 4:01
4. "Love Is Free" (Enhanced Music Video)

== Chart performance ==
Chart (2008)	Peak position
Austria (Ö3 Austria Top 40)	57
Belgium (Belgium Singles Chart)	50
Canada (Canadian Hot 100)	46
Germany (Media Control Charts)	49
Japan Hot 100 (Billboard Japan)	9
Quebec (ADISQ)	22
Romania (Top 100)	56
Switzerland (Schweizer Hitparade)	51
UK Singles (OCC)	76
US Billboard Hot 100	77
US Adult Top 40 (Billboard)	17
US Billboard Pop 100	63
US Adult Alternative Songs (Billboard)	4

=== Year-end charts ===
Chart (2008)	Peak position
U.S. Hot Triple A Songs	18
