= Everywhere That I'm Not =

- US vinyl single

Single by Translator

from the album Heartbeats and Triggers
- Length: 4:03 (album version); 3:46 (single version)
- Label: Columbia/415
- Songwriter(s): Steven Barton
- Producer(s): David Kahne

"Everywhere That I'm Not" was a hit single for San Francisco group Translator in 1982, from the Columbia/415 album Heartbeats And Triggers.

It is said by many fans and critics that the band's signature song was mourning the loss of John Lennon, but this is a mistaken claim. The band's memorial to Lennon was actually another of their songs; the similarly titled "Everywhere", from the same album this single comes from. Coincidentally, the songs' producer, David Kahne, would later produce records for Paul McCartney.

The song was a hit on US college radio but achieved only moderate commercial success. Lamenting this, musician and critic Scott Miller wrote: "From the jazzy, almost dissonant opening riff to the absolutely unforgettable chorus, this is one of music's most glaring should-be-classics."
