= The Offs =

Punk/ska band from San Francisco

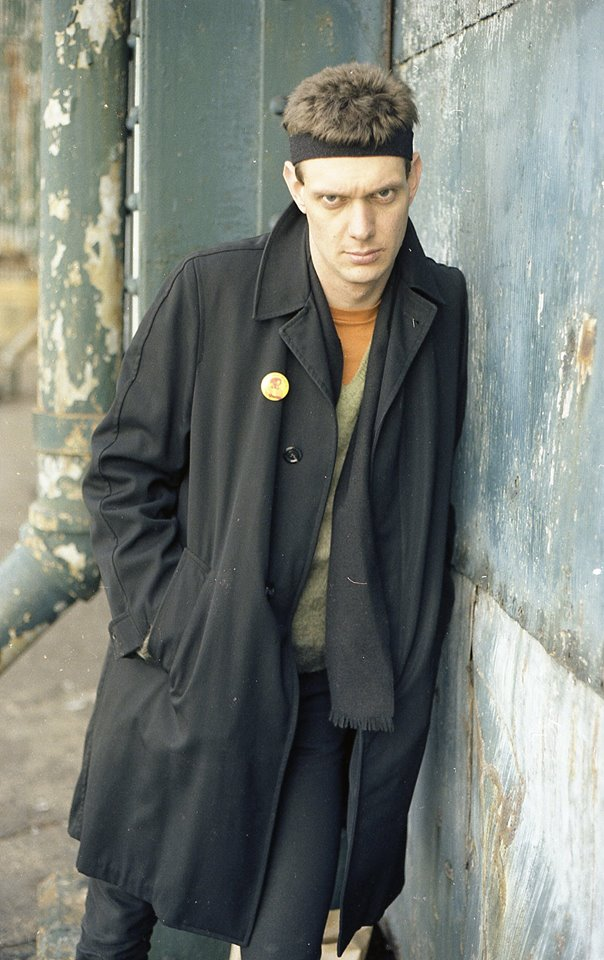
- Don Vinil, lead singer of 'The Offs' in NYC 1980s.

Background information
- Origin: San Francisco, California, United States
- Genre: punk/ska
- Past members: Billy Hawk; Don Vinil; Bob Steeler; Denny Boredom

Formed circa 1978, The Offs were a punk/ska band from San Francisco, started by guitarist Billy Hawk and singer Don Vinil, and later joined by former Hot Tuna drummer Bob Steeler and a rotation of horn players including Bob Roberts, Richard Edson and Roland Young. The Offs were active in the early days of the San Francisco punk rock scene.

== History ==
In 1978, The Offs self-released their first record - a 7" single featuring a cover of the Slickers' Johnny Too Bad, which was championed in Europe by Emperor Rosko on Radio Luxembourg. The B-side was the Billy Hawk-penned 624803. A subsequent release in the same year was Everyone's a Bigot, with Zero Degrees on the B-side, which was the first-ever release on San Francisco's 415 Records. That song later appeared on the Alternative Tentacles hardcore/art punk compilation Let Them Eat Jellybeans!. Another early release was "You Fascinate Me." Lead singer Don Vinil was known for his outrageous on-stage behavior. Fellow San Francisco punk group, Dead Kennedys played their first show with the Offs in 1978. They often played at San Francisco's Mabuhay Gardens.

The Offs also went through a number of bassists, including Denny Boredom (Denny DeGorio), Olga de Volga and Fast Floyd. Eric Peterson joined as bassist in 1980, shortly after the group decamped San Francisco for New York where they quickly became a regular fixture at such New York institutions as the Mudd Club, Danceteria and Max's Kansas City. The Offs counted among their fans and friends numerous people in the downtown New York art/music scene, including artists Jean-Michel Basquiat, Keith Haring, musician and actor Richard Edson, who played trumpet with the band, and Glenn O'Brien, the peripatetic chronicler of the scene for Andy Warhol's Interview magazine.

In 1984, David Ferguson's label CD Presents released a full-length album for the band called The Offs First Record, with artwork by Basquiat.

== Discography ==
=== Singles ===
- 1978 Everyone's A Bigot / 0° (415 Records)
- 1978 Johnny Too Bad / 624803 (Crack In The World)
- 1980 You Fascinate Me / My World (Max's Kansas City Records)
- 1981 Zero Vs. The Offs / Why Boy (Epiphany Records)

=== Albums ===
- 1984 First Record (CD Presents, Ltd.)
- 2000 Live At The Mabuhay Gardens Nov 7 1980 (Vampir Records)

=== Compilations ===
- 1980 Can You Hear Me? Music From The Deaf Club (Optional Music)
- 2000 The Offs: California Skapunk Pioneers (Lost and Found Records)

=== Film/Video ===
- 1979 Deaf/punk (Canyon Cinema Co-op)
