= Digital Stimulation =

Studio album by Units
- Released: 1980
- Genres: New wave; synth punk
- Length: 32:42
- Label: 415

Units chronology
Digital Stimulation (1980)	New Way to Move (EP) (1983)

Digital Stimulation is the debut studio album by American new wave and synth punk band Units, released in 1980, by 415 Records.

== Reception ==
Professional ratings
Review scores
Source	Rating
AllMusic	4/5 stars
The Big Takeover	favorable
Trouser Press	generally favorable

AllMusic wrote that the album "remains a fiery, exciting document of an innovative group who redefined the potential of synthesizers in a rock band format."

== Track listing ==
All tracks are written by The Units.

Side one
No.	Title	Length
1.	"High Pressure Days"	3:19
2.	"Digital Stimulation"	3:10
3.	"Warm Moving Bodies"	3:31
4.	"Go"	2:10
5.	"Mission"	1:45
6.	"Cannibals"	2:44

Side two
No.	Title	Length
1.	"Bug Boy"	2:14
2.	"Tight Fit"	4:03
3.	"Passions Or Patterns"	2:34
4.	"Town By The River"	1:55
5.	"Cowboy"	5:17
Total length:		32:42
