= Now That You're Gone (Sheryl Crow song) =

Single by Sheryl Crow

from the album Detours
- Released: May 2008
- Length: 3:51
- Label: A&M
- Songwriter(s): Sheryl Crow
- Producer(s): Bill Bottrell

Sheryl Crow singles chronology
"Love Is Free" (2008)	"Now That You're Gone" (2008)	"Out of Our Heads" (2008)

Music video
- "Sheryl Crow - Now That You're Gone (Official Music Video)" on YouTube

"Now That You're Gone" is a song written and recorded by American singer-songwriter Sheryl Crow. It was released as the third single from Crow's sixth studio album Detours in the United Kingdom.

The song was ranked the 97th best song of the year 2008 by Rolling Stone, who describe the song as having "(all) the sassy independence of Kelly Clarkson's 'Since U Been Gone,' except 20 years wiser. With bluesy swagger, Crow has mastered the art of writing breakup anthems for grown-ups..."
