= Always on Your Side =

2006 single by Sheryl Crow featuring Sting

Single by Sheryl Crow featuring Sting

from the album Wildflower
- Released: February 13, 2006
- Length: 4:12 (album version); 4:09 (radio edit featuring Sting)
- Label: A&M
- Songwriter: Sheryl Crow
- Producers: Sheryl Crow, John Shanks

Sheryl Crow singles chronology
"Perfect Lie" (2005)	"Always on Your Side" (2006)	"Building Bridges" (2006)

Sting singles chronology
"Lullaby to an Anxious Child" (2005)	"Always on Your Side" (2006)	"Soul Cake" (2009)

Music video
- "Sheryl Crow - Always On Your Side (Official Music Video) ft. Sting" on YouTube

"Always on Your Side" is a song by American singer-songwriter Sheryl Crow from her fifth studio album, Wildflower (2005). It was released as the second single from the album in February 2006. While the original album version features only Crow on lead vocals, the radio version is a duet with British musician Sting. Crow's web site offered a free download of the new single to anyone who had already purchased the Wildflower album. A subsequent edition of the album features the duet version.

The song debuted at No. 35 on the US Billboard Hot 100, becoming the last top 40 hit for both Crow and Sting on the chart. The single also reached No. 2 on the Canadian Singles Chart and peaked at No. 30 in Hungary. The duet received a Grammy Award nomination in 2007 for Best Pop Collaboration with Vocals. The song's video was directed by Nigel Dick.

== Charts ==
Chart (2006)	Peak position
Canada (Nielsen SoundScan)	2
Canada AC (Billboard)	8
Canada Hot AC (Radio & Records)	20
Hungary (Rádiós Top 40)	30
Quebec (ADISQ)	13
UK Singles Downloads (OCC)	35
US Billboard Hot 100	33
US Adult Contemporary (Billboard)	12
US Adult Pop Airplay (Billboard)	11
US Pop 100 (Billboard)	34
