= Light in Your Eyes =

2004 single by Sheryl Crow

"Light In Your Eyes"

Single by Sheryl Crow

from the album The Very Best of Sheryl Crow
- B-side: "You're Not the One"; "My Favorite Mistake" (live)
- Released: April 26, 2004
- Length: 4:01
- Label: A&M
- Songwriters: Sheryl Crow; John Shanks
- Producer: John Shanks

Sheryl Crow singles chronology
"The First Cut Is the Deepest" (2003)	"Light In Your Eyes" (2004)	"Good Is Good" (2005)

Audio video
- "Light In Your Eyes" on YouTube

"Light in Your Eyes" is a song by American musician Sheryl Crow, recorded for her 2003 compilation album The Very Best of Sheryl Crow. The song was serviced to US radio on April 26, 2004, before being released physically in the United Kingdom that June, serving as the second and final single from the compilation. The song peaked at number 73 on the UK Singles Chart and was a top-10 hit on both the US Billboard Triple-A and Adult Top 40 charts.

== Track listing ==
UK CD single

1. "Light in Your Eyes"
2. "You're Not the One"
3. "My Favorite Mistake" (live from Abbey Road Studios)

== Charts ==
=== Weekly charts ===
Weekly chart performance for "Light in Your Eyes"
Chart (2004–2005)	Peak position
Canada Hot AC Top 30 (Radio & Records)	7
Quebec (ADISQ)	19
UK Singles (Official Charts)	73
US Bubbling Under Hot 100 (Billboard)	21
US Adult Alternative Airplay (Billboard)	3
US Adult Contemporary (Billboard)	36
US Adult Pop Airplay (Billboard)	10

=== Year-end charts ===
Year-end chart performance for "Light in Your Eyes"
Chart (2004)	Position
US Adult Top 40 (Billboard)	31
US Triple-A (Billboard)	25

== Release history ==
Release dates and formats for "Light in Your Eyes"
Region	Date	Format(s)	Label(s)	Ref.
United States	April 26, 2004	Hot adult contemporary; triple A radio	A&M	
United Kingdom	June 21, 2004	CD	A&M	
