= The Nuns =

American band

- Origin: San Francisco, California, U.S.
- Genres: New wave; punk rock; alternative rock; gothic rock
- Years active: 1975–1979, 1980, 1986–1994, 1997–2000s
- Labels: 415, Posh Boy, MT, Triple Silence
- Past members: Jennifer Miro; Jeff Olener; Alejandro Escovedo; Delphine Volino; Baron Rubenbauer; Mistress Kris; Mike Varney; Richie Detrick; Pat Ryan; Leslie Q Jeff Raphael; Scott Marshall; Bret Domrose; Leslie Spring; Walter Atkinson; Alex Havoc; Brian Knott; Michael Saintt George

The Nuns was an American rock band based in San Francisco and New York City. Best known as one of the founding acts of the early San Francisco punk scene, the band went through a number of hiatuses and periodic reunions, lineup changes, and changes in style. Overall, The Nuns performed and recorded on and off from the mid-1970s into the 2000s. While the band was centered on Jennifer Miro and Jeff Olener through its various incarnations, Alejandro Escovedo, who went on to later success as an Americana and alternative country musician, was also a key member during its years of fame in late 1970s San Francisco.

== History ==
=== San Francisco punk pioneers ===
The band formed in 1975 in Marin County, California when Alejandro Escovedo and Jeff Olener, who were film students at College of Marin, wanted to make a low-budget film about a strung-out rock singer and a band that could not play its instruments, and decided to play the part themselves. This project evolved into The Nuns. While the band was in its formative phase, they practiced in a warehouse in Terra Linda. Jennifer Miro, who was in a Mill Valley-based band that covered Doobie Brothers songs, practiced at the same warehouse. Olener soon invited Miro to join his band; Miro, who was unhappy with the band she was in, jumped at the opportunity. The Nuns began performing around various venues in the San Francisco area in January 1976. They were among the first punk bands in California and had difficulty finding regular venues. They played the first punk show at the Mabuhay Gardens in December 1976, and quickly became regulars. At their peak of popularity, they were playing two sold-out shows on consecutive weekend nights at the Mabuhay.

The Nuns original manager was Edwin Heaven. In 1977, Heaven discovered them when they opened at The Mabuhay Gardens for The Ramones. Within half a year, he had created a worldwide buzz for the band, designed most of their now-classic posters and, basically, took them from playing at San Francisco's Fab Mab to playing such larger venues as Bill Graham's Winterland and LA's The Whisky.

In January 1978, together with The Avengers they opened for the Sex Pistols at their final concert at San Francisco's Winterland. Even though The Nuns were the bigger draw in San Francisco at this time, they were the first band to go on, ahead of The Avengers.

The band's strong popularity in the San Francisco music scene later led to offers by Bill Graham to manage the band, but the relationship soon turned to animosity touched off by Graham's offense at the song "Decadent Jew". And while the band also received overtures from CBS Records to release a major label album, by the time of the band's initial breakup, they had only managed to produce a few poorly-recorded demo tapes for the label and failed to secure a record deal. The band ultimately released several singles in 1978–1979, as well as the self-titled 1979 7" EP (not to be confused with their self-titled LP a year later).

The Nuns split in 1979 soon after the band was on tour in New York City. Escovedo had decided to stay behind in New York, living at the Chelsea Hotel, while the rest of the band decided to return to San Francisco. Escovedo soon teamed up with Chip and Tony Kinman from The Dils, which had also recently split, forming cowpunk band Rank and File and relocating to Austin, Texas. The remaining members of the band soon split as well, with Olener and new Bay Area cohorts Brett Valory, with drummer jeff Raphael Danny Machine and Jackson Weir III relocating to Los Angeles to form the rock band 391, and Miro remaining in San Francisco to form The VIP's with Pat Ryan in 1979-1981. Miro later relocated to Los Angeles as well, having a solo career under her own name in 1981-1982. After his first successful experience at Leon Russell's Paradise studio, successful in that master tapes were actually produced, Olener had no trouble persuading Posh Boy Records's Robbie Fields to finance the recording of an album by a group that no longer existed based upon Jennifer Miro's participation. Fields had greater difficulty persuading studio owner Brian Elliot of the merits of recording the band. The band reunited but for a single week in late April 1980 (albeit without Escovedo) and recorded their first LP, using only half of the blocked studio time, despite the replacement of the tracking engineer following Miro's walk out on discovering that second-hand multi-track recording tape was being used. The self-titled The Nuns album was released in late 1980 (albeit on BOMP! Records, who licensed it from Posh Boy for the US).

=== First reunion: 1980s rock band ===
In 1986, after several years of inactivity, Miro, Olener, and Raphael reformed The Nuns. The Nuns during this period tilted more towards Miro's new wave-influenced rock sound as Olener's previous writing partner had departed. In 1986, they released their second album Rumania, though its release on the soon-bankrupted PVC Records, an imprint of Jem Records, meant that the album received very little exposure. By 1989, they added a new bassist/cellist, a young Marin County musician Delphine Volino (aka Delphine Neid), and returned to Los Angeles to record Desperate Children for the Posh Boy label, with a distracted Brett Gurewitz at the helm. Volino died of a heroin overdose in mid 1989 soon after the album was recorded. A fourth album, 4 Days In A Motel Room: Their Greatest Sins, was released in 1994, with half the album being a re-release of older material, and the other half consisting of newly recorded material. Miro and Baron Rubenbauer recorded the track Sex Dream under The Nuns moniker without Olener that same year for the Live 105 compilation album, issuing it as a self-released single several years later.

The Nuns were inactive for much of the 1990s, though Miro contributed to several of Narada Michael Walden's recordings during this time.

=== Second reunion: New York gothic ===
Miro and Olener began performing together again in late 1997, soon relocating to New York City. They added east village musicians Brian Knotts on guitar, Alex Havoc on Bass and Walter Atkinson on drums. In this manifestation, The Nuns took on a distinctly gothic rock look and sound, an image aided by Miro's increased visibility as a fetish model (under the name Maitresse Jennifer). The Nuns released a series of singles for the German MT Records label, followed by the Naked Save for Boots CD in 2001 and New York Vampires in 2003. A DVD release of The Nuns: New York Vampires followed in 2005, consisting of several short vampire/fetish movies performed by members of The Nuns, recordings of live performances, and material about the history of The Nuns. Other than Miro and Olener, the members of The Nuns were an entirely new grouping that included several fetish performers. A prominent member of this lineup, Mistress Kris, was murdered in a Times Square hotel in 2007.

== Personnel ==
The band has undergone numerous changes in lineup over the years, however, Jennifer Miro has been a constant member for all of the Nuns live performances and recordings, and Jeff Olener is present on most as well. The earliest version of the band, prior to The Nuns performing live or recording, was centered on Alejandro Escovedo (guitar) and Jeff Olener (vocals), and included a bass player and a drummer, in later recollections referred to only as "Nola" and "Kenny". Jennifer Miro, who was practicing with another band in the same warehouse, was invited to join as vocalist and electric piano player soon after. A more stable lineup formed later around Miro, Olener, and Escovedo, with Richie Detrick added as a third lead singer, Jeffery Raphael as drummer, and a series of bassists – Leslie Q, Mike Varney (1978–1979), and Pat Ryan (1979–1980). After Escovedo departed, Ryan also performed on guitar on The Nuns recorded material. Escovedo and Olener were the main songwriters of the more aggressive punk material, and Miro contributed the more pop-oriented material featuring her blase vocals.

Later lineups were centered on Miro (vocals and keyboards) and Olener (vocals), with a series of shifting personnel making up the rest of the band. In their late 1980s incarnation through Pat Ryan, the band asked Michael Belfer guitarist from The Sleepers and Tuxedomoon to join up. That line-up did some recordings (now lost) and a short West-Coast tour that ended at a very memorable show opening for the British Punk band "The Damned" at "The Stone" on Broadway in San Francisco. Later on Leslie Spring was their guitarist and Delphine Neid was their bassist, however, Neid died of a drug overdose in 1989, days after recording the Desperate Children album. In the early 1990s, the lineup included Bret Domrose (guitar), Tommy King (bass), and Jeff Rosen (drums). Baron Rubenbauer played guitar for The Nuns in the mid to late 1990s; it was also during this period that a few recordings were made without Olener. In 1997, the Nuns performed NYC shows with a new line up consisting of Brian Knotts (guitar), Alex Havoc (bass), Walter Atkinson (drums) and New York actor Mikal Saintt George (back-up vocals). They performed notable shows in the east village. CBGBs, Mothers, Don Hills, Mercury lounge, The Bank, Continental and CIH. The new NUNS lineup recorded four songs that were never released to the public and presumed lost.

On January 4, 2012, it was reported that Jennifer Anderson aka Jennifer Miro died on December 16, 2011, at Bellevue Hospital Center, in Manhattan of a combination of liver and breast cancer. She had borne the ravages of her illness as a secret from the world at large for more than a year. In September 2011, her health had suffered a precipitous decline and she withdrew from the world, cutting off contact with all but a handful of friends without revealing her deteriorating condition. She spent the last several weeks of her life in hospice care at Bellevue. She was 54 and had most recently worked as a receptionist for a law firm in New York City.

Jeff Olener died on December 11, 2014, after many years of seclusion in New Jersey.

== Covers and tributes ==
The Swedish band Sator covered the early Nuns song "No Solution" in 1994; the song reached No. 2 on the Swedish music charts, greater chart success than The Nuns themselves had seen from any of their recordings. This was not a song that The Nuns recorded for any of their releases, but rather was documented on a recording of one of their 1977 performances, which was released as the bootleg Gimme Danger in 1992.

Duane Peters and Pascal Briggs covered "Suicide Child" in 2003, releasing it as a 7" and later on several compilation albums.

Alejandro Escovedo's recollections as a member of The Nuns is the subject of "Nuns Song" from his 2008 album Real Animal.

== Discography ==
=== Singles / EPs ===
Title	Year	Cat #	Label
1. Decadent Jew; 2. Savage; 3. Suicide Child	1979	SUB01	415 Records
1. The Beat; 2. Media Control	1979	SS-7901	Rosco Records (as Los Nuns)
1. World War III; 2. Cock In My Pocket	1980	4166	Rosco Records
1. Wild; 2. Suicide Child	1981	FUN 002	Butt Records (UK release under license from Posh Boy, also releases in Finland and Spain)
1. In The Shadows; 2. Invisible People	1990	PBS 23	Posh Boy Records
1. Sex Dream; 2. Anita	1998	JM 7743	Alien Sex Goddess Records
1. Anita; (split with Die Form)	1999	MT-460	Musical Tragedies
1. Hustler Blue; 2. Rambo Thing; 3. Dominatrix Tonight	1999	MT-480	Musical Tragedies

=== Albums ===
Title	Release date	Cat #	Label
The Nuns	1980	BLP 4010/PBC 105 (Licensed by Posh Boy to Bomp for USA. LP rights reverted to Posh Boy in 1981)	Bomp! Records - USA. Butt Records - UK. Polarvox - Finland. Auvi - Spain.
Rumania	1986	PVC 8951	PVC Records
Desperate Children	1990	PBCD 88158-2	Posh Boy Records
4 Days In A Motel Room - Their Greatest Sins	1994	8159-2	Posh Boy Records
Naked Save For The Boots	2001	MT-442	Empty Records
New York Vampires	2003	TRIPCD002	Triple Silence Records

== Video ==
The Nuns DVD, New York Vampires was released on November 18, 2008. The DVD features the two TV show pilots as well as live concert footage, backstage interviews, a short film noir, photos and a music video shot in London for New York Vampires.
