= Be Myself =

Studio album by Sheryl Crow
- Released: April 21, 2017
- Recorded: September 9 – October 16, 2016
- Studio: Old Green Barn (Nashville, Tennessee)
- Genre: Rock
- Length: 45:20
- Label: Wylie Songs, Warner Bros.
- Producer: Sheryl Crow, Jeff Trott

Sheryl Crow chronology
Feels Like Home (2013)	Be Myself (2017)	Threads (2019)

Singles from Be Myself
- 1. "Halfway There" Released: March 3, 2017

Be Myself is the tenth studio album by American singer-songwriter Sheryl Crow. The album was released on April 21, 2017, by Wylie Songs and Warner Bros. Records. Produced by Crow and Jeff Trott, who also worked with Crow on her self-titled 1996 album and 1998's The Globe Sessions, it features a return to a more rock-driven sound following Crow's 2013 country album, Feels Like Home.

== Release ==
=== Singles ===
The album's lead single, "Halfway There", was released on March 3, 2017.

== Critical reception ==
Professional ratings
Aggregate scores
Source	Rating
Metacritic	69/100
Review scores
Source	Rating
AllMusic	4/5 stars
American Songwriter	3.5/5 stars
Blurt	4/5 stars
Exclaim!	6/10
The Guardian	3/5 stars
Mojo	3/5 stars
PopMatters	7/10 stars
Rolling Stone	3/5 stars
Slant Magazine	3.5/5 stars

Be Myself received mostly positive reviews from music critics. At Metacritic, which assigns a normalized rating out of 100 to reviews from mainstream critics, the album has an average score of 69 out of 100, which indicates "generally favorable reviews" based on 10 reviews.

Stephen Thomas Erlewine of AllMusic rated the album four out of five stars and calls it "set of strong, sophisticated pop." Writing for Rolling Stone and rating the album three out of five stars, Rob Sheffield calls it "excellent" and "a full-blown return to her fierce rock-queen glory."

Dave Simpson from The Guardian gave 3 out of 5 stars and stated "After a short-lived dabble in country music, Be Myself reunites Sheryl Crow with 1990s collaborators Jeff Trott and Tchad Blake and returns to the sassy, carefree, stripped down folk-pop-rock that brought her massive success in that era"

Sal Cinquemani from Slant Magazine rated 3.5 out of 5 stars and wrote "Be Myself might lack the quirks that made Sheryl Crow so distinctive (it opened with a song about aliens, after all), but the album proves that some alliances can outlast even the latest planet-shrinking technology".

== Track listing ==
All tracks are written by Sheryl Crow and Jeff Trott; except "Woo Woo," written by Sheryl Crow, Toby Gad, and Jeff Trott.

No.	Title	Length
1.	"Alone in the Dark"	3:40
2.	"Halfway There"	3:59
3.	"Long Way Back"	5:07
4.	"Be Myself"	4:22
5.	"Roller Skate"	3:19
6.	"Love Will Save the Day"	4:58
7.	"Strangers Again"	3:51
8.	"Rest of Me"	3:52
9.	"Heartbeat Away"	5:35
10.	"Grow Up"	3:27
11.	"Woo Woo"	3:14
Total length:		45:20

Target and Japanese bonus tracks
No.	Title	Length
12.	"Disappearing World"	4:17
13.	"The World You Make"	4:25
14.	"Long Way Back" (Acoustic version)	4:47
Total length:		58:49

== Personnel ==
Credits adapted from AllMusic.

Musicians

- Doyle Bramhall II – soloist, vocal harmony
- Gary Clark Jr. – electric guitar, soloist
- Sheryl Crow – bass, celeste, Fender Rhodes, acoustic guitar, piano, tambourine, toy piano, vocals, Wurlitzer
- Mark Douthit – saxophone
- Fred Eltringham – drums, handclapping, percussion, tambourine
- Audley Freed – acoustic guitar, soloist
- Toby Gad – bass guitar, Moog synthesizer
- Josh Grange – flute, baritone guitar, electric guitar, lap steel guitar, Mellotron, pedal steel guitar, piano
- Barry Green – trombone
- Robert Kearns – bass guitar
- The McCrary Sisters – background vocals
- Adam Minkoff – keyboards
- Doug Moffet – baritone saxophone
- Steve Patrick – trumpet
- Andrew Petroff – bells, drum brushes, drum loop, acoustic guitar, handclapping, keyboards, percussion, shaker, strings, synthesizer, tambourine, Wurlitzer
- Rick Purcell – handclapping
- David Rossi – strings
- Tim Smith – background vocals
- Jeff Trott – bass guitar, acoustic guitar, baritone guitar, electric guitar, acoustic-electric guitar, Moog synthesizer, pump organ, sitar, slide guitar, soloist, SynthAxe, tom-tom, vocal harmony, background vocals, wah wah guitar, Wurlitzer

Technical personnel

- Tchad Blake – engineer, mixing, photography
- Drew Bollman – engineer
- Sheryl Crow – producer
- Bob Ludwig – mastering
- Frank Maddocks – art direction, design
- Andrew Petroff – engineer
- Rick Purcell – studio technician
- Matt Rausch – engineer
- David Rossi – string arrangements
- Mark Seliger – photography
- Jeff Trott – producer
- Alberto Vaz – engineer

== Charts ==
Chart (2017)	Peak position
Australian Albums (ARIA)	97
Belgian Albums (Ultratop Flanders)	104
Belgian Albums (Ultratop Wallonia)	51
Canadian Albums (Billboard)	59
German Albums (Offizielle Top 100)	97
Japanese Albums (Oricon)	67
New Zealand Heatseekers Albums (RMNZ)	8
Scottish Albums (OCC)	35
Spanish Albums (PROMUSICAE)	68
Swiss Albums (Schweizer Hitparade)	43
UK Albums (OCC)	47
US Billboard 200	22
US Top Rock Albums (Billboard)	3

== Release history ==
List of regions, release dates, formats, label and references
Region	Date	Format(s)	Label	Ref.
Worldwide	April 21, 2017	CD; LP; digital download	Warner Bros.	
