= Good Is Good =

2005 single by Sheryl Crow

Single by Sheryl Crow

from the album Wildflower
- B-side: "I Know Why"
- Released: September 19, 2005
- Length: 4:18
- Label: A&M
- Songwriters: Sheryl Crow, Jeff Trott
- Producers: Sheryl Crow, John Shanks

Sheryl Crow singles chronology
"Light in Your Eyes" (2004)	"Good Is Good" (2005)	"Perfect Lie" (2005)

Music video
- "Sheryl Crow - Good Is Good" on YouTube

Wildflower Album Listing
"Perfect Lie" (Track 2)	"Good Is Good" (Track 3)	"Chances Are" (Track 4)

"Good Is Good" is a song by American singer-songwriter Sheryl Crow, and is featured on her 2005 album, Wildflower. It was released as the first single from the album. The single reached No. 64 on the Billboard Hot 100, becoming her first lead single to miss the Top 20 since her debut album. The song was a radio hit, becoming her seventh and most recent No. 1 on the Adult Alternative Airplay chart, staying there for a singular week.

In December 2005, Crow was nominated for a Best Female Pop Vocal Performance Grammy Award for the song, but lost to Kelly Clarkson's "Since U Been Gone".

== Music video ==
The video for "Good Is Good" follows the same concept of art found in the cover of the album and the single, with the singer interacting with images similar to surrealist drawings in movement. At the end of the video there's a scene which was used as the cover of Wildflower.

== Track listing ==
- UK CD (9885348)
1. "Good Is Good" – Album Version
2. "Good Is Good" – Acoustic Version
3. "I Know Why" – Acoustic Version
4. "Good Is Good" – Video

== Chart performance ==
Chart (2005)	Peak position
Canada AC Top 30 (Radio & Records)	19
Canada Hot AC Top 30 (Radio & Records)	2
Germany (Media Control Charts)	89
Netherlands (Single Top 100)	98
Quebec (ADISQ)	19
Switzerland (Schweizer Hitparade)	55
UK Singles (Official Charts)	75
US Billboard Hot 100	64
US Adult Top 40 (Billboard)	5
US Adult Contemporary (Billboard)	16
US Billboard Pop 100	46
US Digital Song Sales (Billboard)	36
US Adult Alternative Songs (Billboard)	1
