= Shine over Babylon =

Single by Sheryl Crow

from the album Detours
- Released: November 2007
- Studio: The Hit Farm (Nashville)
- Genre: Rock, folk rock
- Length: 4:07
- Label: A&M
- Songwriters: Sheryl Crow, Bill Bottrell, Brian MacLeod, Eric Schermerhorn, Luan Parle
- Producer: Bill Bottrell

Sheryl Crow singles chronology
"Not Fade Away" (2007)	"Shine over Babylon" (2007)	"Love Is Free" (2008)

Audio video
- "Shine Over Babylon" on YouTube

"Shine over Babylon" is a song recorded by American rock singer Sheryl Crow. It was the first single released from Crow's album Detours. The song gained some radio airplay and was only released as a digital download, becoming a Triple A - top 5 hit in the United States.

In the summer of 2007, well before its release, Crow told Billboard that the song "is very environmentally conscious, in the tradition of Bob Dylan." She said:

I'm really encouraging artists to write about what's going on, because we seem to be very distracted by some lightweight topics. I think it's time to start writing about the reality of what's around us.

In additional comments on her website, Crow describes the single as "in every way a desperate cry for understanding. Perhaps it is even a battle song in the face of fear."

== Music video ==
The music video was added to the popular video sharing site YouTube on 21 November 2007. The video comprises Crow singing with an acoustic guitar with newspapers scrolling behind her, relating to headlines that have recently been in the press regarding environmental and poverty issues.

== Chart performance ==
Chart (2007/2008)	Peak position
Italy (FIMI)	42
US Adult Alternative Songs (Billboard)	4
US Year-End Triple A	83
