= Wire Train =

American rock band

- Origin: San Francisco, California, U.S.
- Genres: Alternative rock; new wave; post-punk
- Years active: 1983–1992; 2003; 2009
- Labels: 415; Columbia; MCA
- Past members: Kevin Hunter; Kurt Herr; Anders Rundblad; Federico Gil Solá; Brian MacLeod; Jeff Trott

Wire Train was a San Francisco-based alternative rock band, who released six albums in the 1980s and 1990s.

== History ==
The band was formed in 1982 as the Renegades by two students from San Francisco State University, Kevin Hunter and Kurt Herr. Their rhythm section eventually stabilized with fellow students Federico Gil Solá (from Argentina) and Anders Rundblad (from Sweden). When they had to change their name, the band became Wire Train in 1983. The band's first album features Anders Rundblad (bass guitar, vocals), Federico Gil Solá (drums), Kevin Hunter (vocals, guitar), and Kurt Herr (vocals, guitar). Rundblad had previously played with the Swedish bands Motvind and Gary T'To Band.

In June 1983, Wire Train signed to the local 415 Records label, also home to acts like Translator, Red Rockers and Romeo Void, all of which found themselves with national distribution when 415 entered into a deal with Columbia Records.

Wire Train's debut, In a Chamber, produced by David Kahne at The Automatt in San Francisco, was released late in 1983. It achieved success on the U.S. college charts during 1984, and the band toured as openers for Big Country.

Brian MacLeod replaced Gil Solá prior to their second album, Between Two Words, and Herr left during its recording, replaced by Jeff Trott (ex-the Lifers). The album, produced in Vienna by Peter Maunu, was released in 1985. The band's third album, Ten Women, was recorded by Tim Palmer at Utopia studios in London and released in 1987. Ten Women featured a guest appearance by the Alarm guitarist Dave Sharp on "Breakwater Days" and had its first single "She Comes On" banned by the BBC.

After a 1987 European tour, the band went on a two-year hiatus, extricating themselves from their contract with Columbia. Trott played with World Party. and McLeod with Toy Matinee.

Wire Train (1990) and No Soul No Strain (1992) were issued by MCA Records. The latter, produced by Bill Bottrell, was their fourth album to chart, peaking at No. 43 on the Billboard 200.

In 1993, MCA rejected their next effort, Snug, as "too weird". It was released digitally in April 2009.

In 1996, Columbia released a compilation CD, Last Perfect Thing... A Retrospective. The first pressings mistakenly included an uncredited "Half a Lifetime", substituted on later pressings with the correct track, "Last Perfect Thing".

In 2003, the band reunited for an episode of VH1's Band Reunited, but it was never aired.

In 2009, Hunter, MacLeod, Trott and Rundblad reunited again for a three-gig tour in California, in part, to commemorate the digital release of Snug. According to Hunter another collection of songs was recorded concurrently with Snug under the working title of Electric. No new album has been released at this time.

== Band members ==
Most recent members

- Kevin Hunter – vocals, guitar (1983–1993, 2003, 2009)
- Anders Rundblad – bass guitar, vocals (1983–1993, 2003, 2009)
- Jeff Trott – guitar, backing vocals (1985–1993, 2003, 2009)
- Brian MacLeod – drums (1985–1992, 2003, 2009)
- Jebin Bruni - keyboards (1992, 2003) tour only

Former members

- Kurt Herr – vocals, guitar (1983–1985)
- Federico Gil Solá – drums (1983–1985)

Timeline

== Other projects ==
McLeod, Trott and Rundblad all later played with Sheryl Crow.

After leaving Wire Train, Gil Solá returned to his native Argentina, where he was a member of Divididos from 1990 to 1995.

== In popular culture ==
"I Will Not Fall" appeared on the soundtrack for the film Point Break (1991), "I'll Do You" appeared in the game Scarface: The World Is Yours (2006) and "Chamber of Hellos" appeared in the episode "Limbo" (2015) of Halt and Catch Fire.

The band the Action Design covered two Wire Train songs ("I'll Do You" and "Chamber of Hellos") for the soundtrack to Endless Bummer (2009).

== Discography ==
=== Studio albums ===
Year	Title	US	Label
1984	In a Chamber	150	415 / Columbia
1985	Between Two Words	-	415 / Columbia
1987	Ten Women	181	415 / Columbia
1990	Wire Train	-	MCA
1992	No Soul No Strain	-	MCA
2009	Snug	-	Wire Train

=== Compilation albums ===
- In a Chamber / Between Two Words (1995, Oglio Records)
- Last Perfect Thing... A Retrospective (1996, 415/Columbia/Legacy)
- In a Chamber / Between Two Words / Ten Women (2020, BGO Records)

=== Singles ===
- "Chamber of Hellos" (1983)
- "I'll Do You" (1984)
- "Last Perfect Thing" (1985)
- "Skills of Summer" (1985)
- "She Comes On" (1987)
- "Diving" (1987)
- "Should She Cry?" (1990)
- "Stone Me" (1992) - US Modern Rock #23
