= Wildflower (Sheryl Crow album) =

Studio album by Sheryl Crow
- Released: September 27, 2005
- Studios: Music Lane (Austin, Texas); Capitol (Hollywood, California); Henson (Hollywood, California); Larrabee (Los Angeles, California); Ocean Way (Hollywood, California); Sage & Sound (Los Angeles, California); Sunset Sound (Hollywood, California); Talentshop Recorders (Nashville, Tennessee); Black Apple (Portland, Oregon)
- Genres: Pop rock; country rock
- Length: 46:42
- Label: A&M
- Producers: Sheryl Crow, Jeff Trott, John Shanks

Sheryl Crow chronology
The Very Best of Sheryl Crow (2003)	Wildflower (2005)	Hits and Rarities (2007)

Singles from Wildflower
- 1. "Good Is Good" Released: September 19, 2005; 2. "Perfect Lie" Released: November 1, 2005; 3. "Always on Your Side" Released: February 13, 2006

Professional ratings
Aggregate scores
Source	Rating
Metacritic	63/100
Review scores
Source	Rating
AllMusic	3.5/5 stars
Blender	3/5 stars
Entertainment Weekly	C+
The Guardian	2/5 stars
Mojo	3/5 stars
PopMatters	3/10
Q	3/5 stars
Rolling Stone	3/5 stars
Slant Magazine	3.5/5 stars
Uncut	7/10

Wildflower is the fifth studio album by American singer-songwriter Sheryl Crow, first released September 27, 2005. Although the album debuted at No. 2 on the Billboard 200, it received mixed reviews and was not as commercially successful as previous albums, having also peaked at No. 25 on the UK Album Chart (where all her previous studio albums had been Top 10 successes).

In December 2005, however, the album was nominated for a Best Pop Vocal Album Grammy Award, while Sheryl Crow was nominated for a Best Female Pop Vocal Performance Grammy Award for the song "Good Is Good".

The album was certified platinum in the U.S. in December 2005, and as of January 2008, it had sold 949,000 units (over the counter) there.

A deluxe edition of the CD was also released, which contains an additional DVD featuring acoustic versions of many of the album's tracks, as well as the promotional video for the lead single "Good Is Good".

== Track listing ==
No.	Title	Writer(s)	Length
1.	"I Know Why"	Sheryl Crow	4:15
2.	"Perfect Lie"	Crow	4:34
3.	"Good Is Good"	Crow, Jeff Trott	4:18
4.	"Chances Are"	Crow, Trott	5:16
5.	"Wildflower"	Crow	3:57
6.	"Lifetimes"	Crow, Trott	4:12
7.	"Letter to God"	Crow, Trott	4:04
8.	"Live It Up"	Crow, Trott	3:42
9.	"I Don't Wanna Know"	Crow, Trott	4:28
10.	"Always on Your Side"	Crow	4:15
11.	"Where Has All the Love Gone"	Crow, Trott	3:40

Australian / European / Digital bonus tracks
No.	Title	Writer(s)	Length
12.	"Wildflower" (Acoustic Version)	Crow	3:56
13.	"Where Has All the Love Gone" (Acoustic Version)	Crow, Trott	3:41

Japanese bonus track
No.	Title	Writer(s)	Length
14.	"Letter to God" (Acoustic Version)	Crow, Trott	3:29

== Charts and certifications ==
Chart (2005)	Peak position
Australia (ARIA)	98
Austria (Ö3 Austria Top 75)	51
Belgium Flanders (Ultratop)	58
Belgium Wallonia (Ultratop)	87
Canada (Canadian Albums Chart)	1
France (SNEP)	61
Germany (Media Control Charts)	21
Japan (Oricon)	20
Netherlands (MegaCharts)	54
Spain (PROMUSICAE)	97
Sweden (Sverigetopplistan)	48
Switzerland (Swiss Music Charts)	17
United Kingdom (UK Albums Chart)	25
United States (Billboard 200)	2
United States (Top Internet Albums)	2
Italian Albums (FIMI)	64

=== Year-end charts ===
Chart (2005)	Position
United States (Billboard 200)	148

=== Certifications ===
Region	Certification	Certified units/sales
Canada (Music Canada)	Platinum	100,000^{^}
United States (RIAA)	Platinum	949,000
^{^} Shipments figures based on certification alone.

== Personnel ==
- Sheryl Crow – Bass, Acoustic Guitar, Harmony Vocals, Keyboards, Piano, producer, Vocals, Background Vocals, Wurlitzer Electric Piano
- Jeff Trott – Bass, Drum Programming, Acoustic Guitar, Electric Guitar, Keyboards, Piano, producer, Slide Balalaika, Synthesizer Bass, Background Vocals, Wurlitzer Electric Piano
- Abe Laboriel Jr. – Drums
- Ali Helnwein – String Arrangements
- Allen Sides – String Engineer
- Andy Sharp – Assistant Engineer
- Bob Ludwig – Mastering
- Brandon Duncan – Assistant Engineer
- Brian MacLeod – Drums, Acoustic Guitar
- Brian Vibberts – Assistant Engineer
- Bruce Kaphan – Pedal Steel
- Carter Smith – Photography
- Daniel Chase – Casio, Drums, engineer, Percussion, Programming
- Dave Way – Engineer
- David Campbell – String Arrangements
- Dean Baskerville – Engineer
- Drew Vonderhaar – Assistant Engineer
- Eric Danchick – Assistant Engineer
- Errin Familia – Assistant Engineer
- Greg Leisz – Baritone Guitar, Pedal Steel
- Gustavo Papaleo – Cover Photo
- Jamie Muhoberac – Keyboards
- Jeff Moses – Assistant Engineer
- Jeff Rothschild – Drums, engineer, Mixing, Programming
- Jimmy Hoyson – Assistant Engineer
- Joel Derouin – Concert Master
- John Shanks – Banjo, Bass, Acoustic Guitar, Electric Guitar, Keyboards, Mixing, producer, Background Vocals
- Keith Schreiner – Drum Programming
- Kevin Harp – Assistant Engineer
- Mike Elizondo – Bass
- Pam Wertheimer – Production Coordination
- Psyop – Art Direction, Design, Illustrations
- Roger Joseph Manning Jr. – Piano
- Scooter Weintraub – Management
- Shari Sutcliffe – Contractor, Production Coordination
- Sheryl Nields – Cover Photo, Photography
- Steve Churchyard – String Engineer
- Trina Shoemaker – Engineer
