= Brian MacLeod (American musician) =

American drummer and songwriter (born 1962)

Brian MacLeod (born April 27, 1962) is an American recording drummer and songwriter. He has been a member of Group 87, Wire Train, Toy Matinee, and the "Tuesday Music Club" collective along with Sheryl Crow's acclaimed album Tuesday Night Music Club. MacLeod lives in Southern California.

== Biography ==
MacLeod grew up in Sunnyvale, California and attended Fremont High School from 1976 to 1979.

He is a member of The Scrantones, the group credited for performing the theme to the American version of the TV show The Office (set in Scranton, Pennsylvania).

He has performed with many other artists, including Madonna, Leonard Cohen, Tears For Fears, Seal, Chris Isaak, Melissa Etheridge, Pink, Christina Aguilera, Kevin Gilbert, Jewel, Stevie Nicks, Ziggy Marley, Tina Turner, Roger Waters, Rosanne Cash, Sara Bareilles, Brandi Carlile, The The, John Hiatt, & Grace Slick.

MacLeod's songwriting credits include: "Everyday Is a Winding Road", "Strong Enough", "A Change Would Do You Good", and "Shine Over Babylon" with Sheryl Crow; "Waiting for Love" with Pink; "Under a Cloud" with The Bangles & "Supermodel" from the film Clueless; "Queen of Compromise" with Tears for Fears.

== Discography ==
- 1981 The Sleepers, Painless Nights
- 1984 Various, Let Them Eat Jellybeans! (Wounds - An Object)
- 1984 Grace Slick, Software
- 1984 Group 87, A Career in Dada Processing
- 1984 Jefferson Starship, Nuclear Furniture
- 1984 Wolf & Wolf, Wolf & Wolf
- 1985 Wire Train, Between Two Words
- 1985 Patrick O'Hearn, Ancient Dreams
- 1987 Wire Train, Ten Women
- 1987 Schönherz and Scott, One Night in Vienna
- 1988 Philip Aaberg, Out of the Frame
- 1990 The Dream Academy, A Different Kind of Weather
- 1990 Wire Train, Wire Train
- 1990 Toy Matinee, Toy Matinee
- 1990 Divinyls, Divinyls
- 1991 Schönherz and Scott, Under a Big Sky
- 1991 Patty Larkin, Tango
- 1991 Dramarama, Vinyl
- 1991 John Gorka, Jack's Crows
- 1992 David Baerwald, Triage
- 1992 Wire Train, No Soul No Strain
- 1992 Roger Waters, Amused to Death
- 1993 Various, Posse Soundtrack (David & David - Free At Last)
- 1993 John Hiatt, Perfectly Good Guitar
- 1993 Sheryl Crow, Tuesday Night Music Club
- 1993 Paul Westerberg, Down Love
- 1994 Katey Sagal, Well...
- 1994 Various, If I Were a Carpenter (Sheryl Crow - Solitaire)
- 1994 3rd Matinee, Meanwhile
- 1994 The Sleepers, Holding Back (7" Single)
- 1994 Tim Pierce, Guitarland
- 1994 The The, Hanky Panky
- 1995 Andy Prieboy, Sins of Our Fathers
- 1995 Chynna Phillips, Naked and Sacred
- 1995 Kevin Gilbert, Thud
- 1995 Tears for Fears, Raoul and the Kings of Spain
- 1995 Michael W. Smith, I'll Lead You Home
- 1996 Susanna Hoffs, Susanna Hoffs
- 1996 The Sleepers, The Less An Object
- 1996 Linda Perry, In Flight
- 1996 Sheryl Crow, Sheryl Crow
- 1997 Star 69, Eating February
- 1998 Wild Orchid, Oxygen
- 1998 John Hiatt, The Best Of
- 1998 Jude, No One Is Really Beautiful
- 1998 4Him, Obvious
- 1998 Cracker, Gentleman's Blues
- 1998 Jewel, Spirit
- 1998 Five Easy Pieces, Five Easy Pieces
- 1998 Vonda Shepard, Songs from Ally McBeal
- 1998 Kaviar, Kaviar
- 1999 Jeremy Toback, Another True Fiction
- 1999 Mychael Danna, Ride With the Devil
- 1999 Collapsis, Dirty Wake
- 1999 Lara Fabian, Lara Fabian
- 1999 Melissa Etheridge, Breakdown
- 1999 The The, NakedSelf
- 2000 Ronan Keating, Ronan
- 2000 Kevin Gilbert, The Shaming of the True
- 2000 Lara Satterfield, Dirty Velvet Lie
- 2001 Shelby Lynne, Love, Shelby
- 2001 Stevie Nicks, Trouble in Shangri-La
- 2002 Sheryl Crow, C'mon, C'mon
- 2002 Kaviar, The Kaviar Sessions (recorded in 1996)
- 2003 Ziggy Marley, Dragonfly
- 2003 Michelle Branch, Hotel Paper
- 2004 Delta Goodrem, Mistaken Identity
- 2004 Melissa Etheridge, Lucky
- 2004 Anastacia, Anastacia
- 2005 Sheryl Crow, Wildflower
- 2005 Charlotte Church, Tissues and Issues
- 2005 Brandi Carlile, Brandi Carlile
- 2006 Ilse DeLange, The Great Escape
- 2006 Skye Edwards, Mind How You Go
- 2006 Rosanne Cash, Black Cadillac
- 2007 Sara Bareilles, Little Voice
- 2007 Carina Round, Slow Motion Addict
- 2009 Chris Isaak, Mr. Lucky
- 2009 Kevin Gilbert, Nuts
- 2009 Kevin Gilbert, Bolts
- 2014 Leonard Cohen, Popular Problems
- 2014 Ziggy Marley, Fly Rasta
- 2014 Adam Cohen, We Go Home
- 2016 Ziggy Marley, Ziggy Marley
- 2016 Leonard Cohen, You Want It Darker
- 2018 Rita Coolidge, Safe in The Arms of Mine
- 2021 Kevin Gilbert, Covers
