= Drivin' (Pearl Harbor and the Explosions song) =

Single by Pearl Harbor and the Explosions
- Released: 1979, 1980
- Length: 4:17, 3:40
- Label: 415, Warner Bros.
- Songwriter: Stench/Gates/Bilt/Stench
- Producer: David Kahne

Alternative cover
- Warner Bros. version

"Drivin'" was a moderately successful hit single for San Francisco band Pearl Harbor and the Explosions. It first was released on 415 Records, November 21, 1979. Shortly after, it was re-recorded for the band's self-titled debut LP on Warner Bros, and that version was also released as a single.

After hearing the 415 single, the band Jane Aire and the Belvederes recorded a cover version of "Drivin'", which was released almost at the same time as Pearl Harbor's own WB version.

== Track listing ==
=== 7" (415 version) ===
1. "Drivin'"
2. "Release It"

=== 7" (Warner Bros. version) ===
1. "Drivin'"
2. "The Big One"
