= Pearl Harbor and the Explosions =

American rock band

- Genres: Alternative rock, new wave
- Years active: 1978–1982
- Past members: Pearl E. Gates; Peter Bilt; John Stench; Hilary Stench

Pearl Harbor and the Explosions was a musical act from San Francisco, California, United States. Forming in 1979, the new wave band had limited success in the late 1970s and early 1980s, with their debut single, "Drivin'", reaching the lower end of the American Billboard chart in 1980. In the same year, they released a self-titled LP which included the song "Shut Up and Dance", which received considerable airplay, particularly in the Bay Area.

The vocalist, Pearl E. Gates (also known as Pearl Harbor and later Pearl Harbour (British and Canadian spelling), was based in the UK and was married to Clash bassist Paul Simonon. Gates had been a part of the Leila and the Snakes live shows, then formed the band. After Gates left the band, the remaining members, Peter Bilt and the Stench brothers (stage names for John and Hilary Hanes) performed as Peter Bilt and the Expressions.

== Discography ==
- Pearl Harbor and the Explosions (1979/1980) US Billboard Albums #107
- Don't Follow Me, I'm Lost Too (1980) US Billboard Albums #170
- Pearls Galore (1984)
- Island (1984)
- Here Comes Trouble (1995)
