= 415 Records =

American record label

- Parent company: Sony BMG
- Founded: 1978
- Founder: Howie Klein, Chris Knab, Butch Bridges
- Defunct: 1989
- Status: Defunct
- Distributor: Columbia
- Genre: New wave, post-punk, alternative rock
- Country of origin: U.S.
- Location: San Francisco, California

415 Records was a San Francisco record label created in 1978. The label focused its efforts on local punk rock and new wave music acts of the late 1970s through the late 1980s, including The Offs, The Nuns, The Units, Romeo Void, and Wire Train. Its name, pronounced four-one-five (not four-fifteen), was a play on both the telephone area code for the San Francisco area and the California penal code section for disturbing the peace (indeed, in some promotional material, the phrase "disturbing the peace" was written underneath the 415 logo). The label had a productive partnership with Columbia Records from 1981 until shortly before it was sold in 1989 to Sandy Pearlman, who retitled the label Popular Metaphysics.

== History ==
415 Records was founded in San Francisco in 1978 by entrepreneurs Howie Klein, Chris Knab, and Butch Bridges. Klein was a writer and entertainment promoter, Knab owned an eclectic record store in the Noe Valley section of San Francisco Aquarius Records, and Bridges was a music collector and retailer. Klein and Knab had become friends when Klein did some photography for his friend Harvey Milk, whose camera store was close to Knab's Aquarius Records on Castro Street. They worked together on various radio shows around the Bay Area, including an alternative radio show on KSAN, and they started recording and promoting local musicians out of Knab's record store.

Klein ran the label from a tiny office on 16th Street in the Mission, a district of San Francisco, where he kept a pushpin-covered United States map on his wall, bearing a sign that read, "All Bands on Tour All the Time." Klein used his own late-night weekend radio shows to showcase his artist's records and he promoted them all over the country to nightclubs, record stores, and a newly blossoming array of other alternative radio stations. His artists were part of the 1980s San Francisco rock underground, though Klein leaned more toward the accessible, fun, new wave bands than the thrash metal and hard-core punk bands who were also part of that scene. 415 was the first North American record label to focus on punk and new wave music and they featured mostly musicians from the San Francisco region, though the label eventually also included artists from other areas. The British label Stiff Records had done similarly two years earlier; marketing England's emergent 1970s pub rock scene as punk and new wave and releasing their first record in August 1976.

415 Records enjoyed early and sustained support from Bill Graham and from David Rubinson, owner of The Automatt recording studio on Folsom Street. Bill Graham managed many top-name acts through his management and promotion agency, Bill Graham Presents, and from the start of the label he booked 415's artists as opening acts for major headlining bands to help them gain broader exposure. Queenie Taylor, long an employee of Bill Graham Presents, purchased Butch Bridges' share of 415 Records in 1979.

Rubinson discounted fees for 415 label bands to record at San Francisco's The Automatt studios; sometimes recording them on speculation, such that the studio would share in the profits from those record sales. David Kahne, operating out of a closet-sized office upstairs at The Automatt, worked as 415's A&R director, performing artist development and in-house production and engineering there for 415 until 1982, when he left Automatt and went to work in Los Angeles as Vice President of A&R for Columbia Records. Even so, he continued to produce records for artists on the 415 label.

415's first release was a 1978 single by The Offs, entitled Everyone's a Bigot, with 0° on the B-side (cat#911-39, 1978). Subsequent early releases included 7-inch EPs by SVT (cat#S0005, 1979), The Nuns (cat#SUB01, 1979), and Pearl Harbor and the Explosions Drivin' (uncatalogued, 1979). Later records included a 7-inch by The Mutants (cat#34859, 1980), an album by The Units (cat#A0003, 1980), a 12-inch 33 1/3 rpm album by Romeo Void (cat# 415A-0007, 1981), a mini-album by New Math (cat#A0008, 1981), and various other releases for many other bands.

In 1981, 415 released Romeo Void's successful first LP, It's a Condition and then they built on that success by signing a co-branding contract with Columbia Records that gave Columbia first rights of refusal to produce, manufacture, and promote their artists' recordings. Many other independent labels would form similar alliances with major labels over the coming decades. 415 retained (nearly) full artistic control over which artists to sign, all recording, and the selection of songs and artwork. Columbia co-branded albums for Romeo Void, Translator, Wire Train, Until December and the Red Rockers under this arrangement; while outside the Columbia deal, Monkey Rhythm, the Pop-O-Pies, and The Uptones all recorded albums that were released and promoted independently by 415 Records. Like many other independent labels, 415 had struggled to reach a national market, but by partnering with Columbia's knowledge and its established connections with radio, television, and retailers, they were able to bring their records to a much broader audience.

Following Kahne's departure in 1982, local musician and producer Daniel Levitin began working in the A&R department and in 1984, he became Director of A&R, serving as staff engineer and handling in-house production as well as development of new artists. In the early 1980s, Queenie Taylor had begun managing Wolfgang's nightclub in San Francisco, and later, in the early 1990s, Slim's nightclub, owned by Boz Scaggs. Christopher Knab sold his share of the label in 1985 and he moved to Seattle, Washington to manage the University of Washington's alternative radio station KCMU, now KEXP 90.3 fm. Klein joined Sire Records in 1987 and he was named general manager of Reprise Records in 1989.

Five artists that Levitin was supervising at 415 were turned down by Columbia for the 415/Columbia partnership: The Stir-Ups, The Big Race, The Scene, The Afflicted and Rhythm Riot. With Howie's blessing, Levitin completed the production for the latter two and sold the distribution rights to a different independent label, San Francisco's Infrasonic Records.

In 1989, Howie Klein was named general manager of Reprise Records in Burbank, California and Levitin stayed to help run the label after Klein left. Three months later, Sandy Pearlman and Steve Schenck bought 415. By this time, Al Teller, who had been president of Columbia Records when the 415 partnership began, was now president of MCA Records. Pearlman changed the record label's name to Popular Metaphysics and formed a co-branding alliance with MCA, ending the 415 label.

== Post-closing activities ==
- Howie Klein became president of Reprise and executive vice president of Warner Bros. Records in 1995 which he remained until retiring in 2001. Klein is now active in politics, writes a blog, downwithtyranny.com, and is working on a novel.
- Queenie Taylor had begun managing Wolfgang's nightclub in San Francisco in the early 1980s and later, in the early 1990s, managed Slims nightclub, owned by Boz Scaggs.
- Daniel Levitin worked as an A&R representative for Columbia , RCA, Warner Bros., Miramax and other companies before returning to college, and is currently a professor of psychology, neuroscience, education, and music at McGill University in Montreal.
- David Kahne is currently Vice President of A&R at Warner Bros. Records.
- Romeo Void's album, Benefactor, first released on 415 records in 1982, was recompiled by Sony BMG Music Entertainment and released as a CD on Wounded Bird Records in 2006, with 4 bonus tracks taken from their original "Never Say Never" 12-inch EP release, also on 415 Records.
- A reunion concert was held at Slim's in San Francisco in September 2009, celebrating 415 Records and featuring several of its recording artists, including Wire Train, Translator and Debora Iyall of Romeo Void.

== Artists released on 415 ==
Although closely associated with punk rock and new wave, 415 Records hosted a diverse group of artists, including:

- Eddie Gorodetsky & Tom Couch
- The Mutants
- The Nuns
- The Offs
- Pearl Harbor and the Explosions
- Pop-O-Pies
- Red Rockers
- Roky Erickson and the Aliens
- Romeo Void
- SVT
- Translator
- The Units
- Until December
- The Uptones
- Wire Train

== See also ==
- List of record labels
