= Alex Moser =

Austrian hair stylist and make-up artist

Alexander Moser (born 1979) is an Austrian hair stylist living and working in Vienna.

== Career ==
Moser was born in the Austrian province of Burgenland and learned his profession in Vienna's most prestigious hair salons − Bundy & Bundy, Grecht and Erich Joham. In 1999 and in 2000 he was employed at the Theater an der Wien as hair stylist for the musical Mozart!. Thereafter he completed his training at Toni & Guy in Vienna and Stuttgart and, in 2006, started a five year long cooperation with Vienna's hair style salon Less is more. Simultaneously he worked as a freelancer for print, film and television – both editorials and commercials. Since 2014, his career has leant more toward German and international film productions. In addition he gives seminars for Schwarzkopf, Landoll and Elite and coaches young and upcoming hair stylists from all over Austria.

Moser has worked for a series of commercial clients such as Austrian Airlines, Austrian Federal Railways, Casinos Austria, Coca cola light, Europay International, Ford Fusion, Frey Wille, Groupe Danone, Dorotheum, Möbel Lutz, Ottakringer, Silhouette and Wiener Linien, as well as for the fashion brands Agent Provocateur, Diesel, DSquared², Lena Hoschek, Levi's, Monkey on my Shoulder, Palmers, Triumph and Vivienne Westwood.

In the field of the media, he worked for Ö3 and the Romy Awards (presented by Austria's daily newspaper Kurier), he appeared in the TV-show Austria's Next Topmodel on Puls 4 and was a member of the styling team of Vienna's most prestigious charity event, the Life Ball. His editorials have appeared in all major Austrian papers and magazines, such as Kronen Zeitung, Die Presse, Diva, Woman and Wienerin. Moser cooperated with the fashion class at the University of Applied Arts Vienna and freelanced as a theatrical makeup artist at Vienna's Volksoper. During the course of his career, he also styled such stars as opera singer Anna Netrebko, concert pianist Lang Lang, politician Eva Glawischnig and Song Contest winner Conchita Wurst, actresses Mavie Hörbiger, Birgit Minichmayr, Eva Longoria, Saskia Mulder, Nina Proll, Mallika Sherawat, Ursula Strauss, Franziska Weisz and Elke Winkens, models Maggie Rizer, Iris Strubegger and Marcus Schenkenberg, as well as German and Austrian TV-stars such as Dieter Bohlen, Eva Pölzl and Mirjam Weichselbraun.

He has received several prestigious awards.

== Philosophy ==
I love hair, it's my instrument.

== Selected filmography ==
- Woman in Gold (2015), starring Helen Mirren
- Mission: Impossible – Rogue Nation (2015), starring Tom Cruise
- Point Break (2015)

== Accolades ==
- 2008 Austrian Hairdressing Award, categories Avantgarde and Press
- 2009 Hairdresser of the Year plus four categories of the Austrian Hairdressing Award (Avantgarde, Press, Ladies, Gentlemen)
- 2010 Austrian Hairdressing Award (Avantgarde, Ladies) plus first member of the Schwarzkopf Hall of Fame
- 2011 Austrian Hairdressing Award (Ladies)
- 2011 Vienna Fashion Award for Best Hairstyling
