= Jeremy Turner (composer) =

American composer, musician (born 1975)

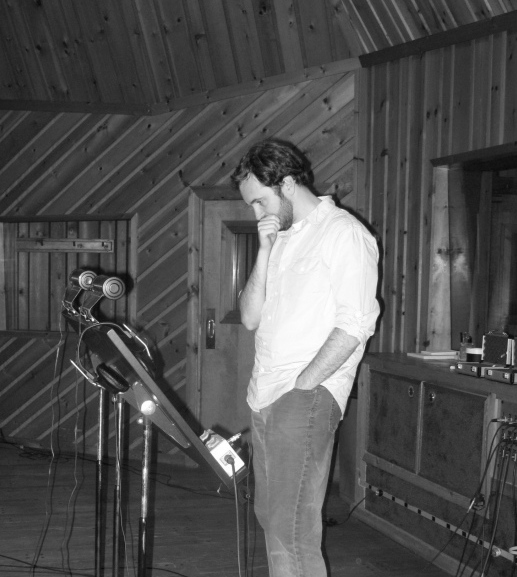

Background information
- Born: June 18, 1975 (age 51); Sewickley, Pennsylvania, United States
- Occupations: Composer, musician
- Instruments: Cello, piano, guitar, voice
- Website: jeremyturnerstudio.com

Jeremy Turner (born June 18, 1975 in Sewickley, Pennsylvania) is an American composer and multi-instrumentalist living in California.

== Biography ==
Jeremy Turner began playing the piano and the cello as a young child. After his family moved to Michigan where his father was Director of Admissions at Michigan State University, Turner attended East Lansing High School. He then furthered his musical studies at The Juilliard School as a pupil of Harvey Shapiro. In 1997, before graduating Juilliard, Turner joined The Metropolitan Opera Orchestra at just 21 years old, becoming one of the youngest members ever to join the ensemble. At the end of his first season Turner was invited to join the Met Chamber Ensemble in its inaugural year. In 2005 he took a leave of absence from the Met to be the interim Principal Cellist of The Auckland Philharmonia Orchestra in New Zealand. After returning to the Met in 2006, Turner played his final season in 2011 before leaving the orchestra to pursue composition.

== Composer/performer ==
Turner has recorded with musicians such as Paul McCartney, David Byrne, Sufjan Stevens, and The National, has performed with various artists that include Renee Fleming, Joshua Bell, and Arcade Fire and as a conductor has appeared twice at the LACMA Art + Film Gala. In 2013, he collaborated on original music with James Murphy for the Broadway revival of Harold Pinter's Betrayal, directed by Mike Nichols. As a composer, Turner has been nominated for two Emmy Awards, won the Music & Sound Award (UK), won the International Documentary Association award for best music, was a 2015 Sundance fellow, and was named in NPR Music's Favorite Songs of 2014. He received the AICP Award for best original music for his score to Google's first ever television commercial, "Parisian Love", which debuted during the broadcast of Super Bowl XLIV . He has performed on Saturday Night Live with My Morning Jacket, the Late Show With David Letterman with Dirty Projectors, and performed with Renee Fleming at the opening of Carnegie Hall's Zankel Hall. In 2015 he composed music for Chris Doyle's exhibition "Night Lights at Wave Hill", featuring the Brooklyn Youth Chorus. Turner was a member of Low City, a musical duo based in Brooklyn. In 2014 he appeared with Simon Spurr in the September issue of Vanity Fair

== Selected film and television scores ==
- A Birder's Guide to Everything (2013)
- Narco Cultura (2013)
- Black Gold by PES (2014)
- This Time Next Year (2014)
- ESPN 30 for 30: First Pitch (2015)
- Americana (2016)
- Trophy (2017)
- Five Came Back (TV series) (2017)
- Family (2018)
- Strokes Of Genius (2018)
- Come As You Are (2019)
- Ode To Joy (2019)
- Killer Inside: The Mind of Aaron Hernandez (2020)
- Immigration Nation (2020)
- Chef's Table (2020)
- Marvel's 616 (2020)
- WeWork: Or The Making and Breaking of a $47 Billion Unicorn (2021)
- A Spark Story (2021)

== Main titles/themes ==
- Independent Lens (2014–)
- A Year in Space (2015)
- Strokes of Genius (2018)
- Immigration Nation (2020)
- Marvel's 616 (2020)

== Concert works ==
- The Bear and the Squirrel (2013) written for yMusic
- The Fluid (2014) written for woodwind ensemble, cello, and piano
- The Lightening (2015) written for the Brooklyn Youth Chorus
- The Inland Seas (2016) written for James Ehnes and Chris Thile
- Swell (2017) written for The Flux Quartet
- Suite of Unreason (2017) written for clarinet, cello, piano and percussion
- Six Mile House (2021) written for piano, clarinet, violin, and cello
- Shorebirds (2022) written for solo violin
- Elegy (2026) written for string orchestra

== Selected album appearances ==
- Mariah Carey – Charmbracelet (2002, Island Records)
- Joss Stone – The Soul Sessions (2003, S-Curve Records)
- David Byrne – Grown Backwards (2004, Nonesuch Records)
- Akron/Family – Akron/Family (2005, Young God Records)
- Free Energy – Stuck on Nothing (2010, DFA Records)
- Sufjan Stevens – The Age of Adz (2010, Asthmatic Kitty)
- Hercules and Love Affair – Blue Songs (2011, Moshi Moshi Records)
- Teddy Thompson – Bella (2011, Verve Forecast Records)
- Citizen Cope – One Lovely Day (2012, Rainbow Recordings)
- The National – Trouble Will Find Me (2013, 4AD)
- Gabriel Kahane – The Ambassador (2014, Sony Masterworks)
- Museum of Love – Museum of Love (2014, DFA Records)
- yMusic– Balance Problems (2014, New Amsterdam Records)
- GIVERS - New Kingdom (2015, Glassnote Records)
- LCD Soundsystem - Christmas Will Break Your Heart (2015, DFA Records)
- S. Carey - 100 Acres (2018, Jagjaguwar)
