= Rainwater (disambiguation) =

Rainwater usually refers to the water from rain.

Rainwater may also refer to:

- Rainwater Basin, a loess plain in south-central Nebraska
- Rainwater Creek, a tributary stream of Lake Fork Creek in Northeast Texas
- Rainwater Observatory and Planetarium, located in French Camp, Mississippi
- The Rainwater LP, 2010 album by Citizen Cope
- Rain water, literal meaning of Yushui, a Chinese solar term

== As a surname ==
- Edwin R. Rainwater (1813–1850), a soldier in the Texas Army during the Texas Revolution
- Gregg Rainwater (born 1966), American actor
- James Rainwater (1917–1986), American physicist
- Jody Rainwater (1920–2011), American bluegrass musician and radio personality
- John Rainwater (created 1952), fictional mathematician and author of functional analysis papers
- Lee Rainwater (1928–2015), American sociologist and professor of sociology at Harvard University
- Manford W. Rainwater (1913–1997), American politician
- Marvin Rainwater (1925–2013), American country and rockabilly singer and songwriter
- Paul Rainwater, Louisiana government official
- Richard Rainwater (1944–2015), American investor and philanthropist
- Rotimi Rainwater (born 1970), American writer, director, and producer
