= Sideways (Clarence Greenwood song) =

Song written by American artist Clarence Greenwood

Song by Santana featuring Citizen Cope

from the album Shaman
- Released: October 22, 2002
- Genre: Blues rock
- Length: 4:41
- Label: Arista
- Songwriter: Clarence Greenwood
- Producer: Clarence Greenwood

"Sideways" is a song written by American artist Clarence Greenwood, who is known by the pseudonym Citizen Cope. Although the song has never charted, it has been widely featured in pop culture. The song was included on Santana's 2002 album Shaman. Citizen Cope then included it in his 2004 album, The Clarence Greenwood Recordings. It has since been covered by Sheryl Crow, John Mayer, and Tyler James. It achieved gold RIAA certification in 2019.

== Original version ==
The song was included in Santana's Shaman album featuring Citizen Cope. Greenwood is credited as the writer and producer of this track. A two-line refrain in the song that is repeated is "These feelings won't go away, They've been knockin' me sideways," leading to its actual and its commonly mistaken title. This version uses an electric guitar backup behind Citizen Cope's vocals. Citizen Cope has a version featuring Santana with a music video that is set to scenes from the 2006 Hugh Jackman, and Rachel Weisz film The Fountain.

== Citizen Cope version ==
The song was included on Citizen Cope's 2004 album The Clarence Greenwood Recordings with a running time of 5:22. The Video for this version credits Craig M. Johnson as the director and was distributed by RCA Records. It features Greenwood playing a classical guitar while singing and various spliced images of him. A Re-recording of the song appears on a limited edition of Citizen Cope's 2010 album The Rainwater LP. Citizen Cope's version also appears on the 2005 compilation album Live at the World Cafe: Volume 19 with a running time of 5:19. The song is also included in the soundtrack for the 2010 Italian film Baciami ancora. On August 30, 2019, which is almost 15 years after its September 14, 2004 single release date, the song achieved gold RIAA certification.

Region	Certification	Certified units/sales
United States (RIAA)	Gold	500,000^{‡}
^{‡} Sales+streaming figures based on certification alone.

== Other versions ==
Sheryl Crow does a 5:11 version featuring Citizen Cope on her 2010 album 100 Miles from Memphis. Part of this version appeared on the November 1, 2011 "Hard Knocks" episode (episode 7) of Body of Proof's second season. The song was also performed live by guitarists Nuno Bettencourt and Zakk Wylde during the 2016 Generation Axe tour.

== Pop culture ==
- Featured in the episode "My Jiggly Ball" of the television series Scrubs
- Featured in 2006's Trust the Man
- Featured in 2006's The Myth of More of the television series Windfall
- Featured in 2008's Ghost Town
- In the television series, One Tree Hill
- Featured on Entourage, episode "The Cannes Kids"
- Featured in 2009's So You Think You Can Dance
- Featured in 2010 Italian film Baciami ancora directed by Gabriele Muccino.
