= Julia Spicker =

Austrian photographer

Julia Spicker (born in Braunau am Inn) is an Austrian photographer. She is well known for her pictures of self-confident women, but covers a broad range of portrait and fashion photography.

== Career ==
Julia Spicker was born in Upper Austria. She was interested in photography and the arts already in early years. After moving to Vienna, she spent several years working as a photographic assistant in Austria and abroad. In addition to her longtime working experience, she successfully graduated from the College of Photography at the Höhere Graphische Bundes-Lehr- und Versuchsanstalt in Vienna. Since 2009, she is working as an independent photographer, specializing in portraits and fashion. Among well known persons photographed by Spicker are singer Edita Malovčić also known as Madita, actress Nina Proll, as well as Austrian top models Benedict Angerer, Gerhard Freidl, Michael Pöllinger, Helena Severin and Jana Wieland.

The photographer created many editorials for Austrian daily newspapers and high gloss magazines − like Die Presse (Schaufenster) or Diva, First Magazin, Wienerin and Woman.

Her advertising work includes campaigns for Silhouette eyewear, Briolett make-up brushes, Lili Radu bags and Scarosso Italia fashion. In 2013, she was invited to create the prestigious campaign for the Vienna Awards for Fashion and Lifestyle. She chose to work with Emma Heming-Willis, who was invited to star as Empress Elisabeth of Austria. In 2014, Spicker herself received the Vienna Awards for Fashion and Lifestyle as Best Photographer. She was the first woman awarded in this category. The same year, she received a lot of attention for her photographs Hommage an René Magritte — a campaign for Viennese hair stylist Patrizia Grecht.

== Award ==
- 2014 Vienna Fashion Awards as Best Photographer
