= Wolfgang Lindenhofer =

Wolfgang Lindenhofer is an Austrian hair stylist and make-up artist living and working in Vienna.

== Career ==
Lindenhofer styled several personalities from music, film and fashion while they stayed in Austria − amongst them musicians Andrew Butler, Feist and Róisín Murphy, Burgtheater actresses Jasna Fritzi Bauer und Birgit Minichmayr, movie stars Pamela Anderson, Isabelle Huppert and Isabella Rossellini, as well as models Naomi Campbell, Milla Jovovich, Carmen Kass, Karolína Kurková and many more. He collaborated with photographers such as Andreas Bitesnich, Michel Comte, Thomas Lohr, Elfie Semotan, Mario Testino and Erwin Wurm. His work has been published in nearly every Austrian paper and magazine, as well as in AnOther Magazine and Neon, in the German edition of Interview, in Marie Claire, Sleek, L'Officiel and in the Indian edition of Harper's Bazaar.

The stylist was employed at several runway shows at the fashion week in Paris, i.e. for Fabric Interseason, Wendy & Jim, Cosmic Wonder and Petar Petrov. In Paris he also assisted Tomohiro Ohashi at runway shows of Maison Martin Margiela, Zuhair Murad and Maxime Simoëns. He was committed to campaigns for national and international brands such as BIPA, Brandmair, Braun, Deichmann, Salvatore Ferragamo, Kniže & Comp., Levi's, Mexx, Nokia, Palmers, Popp & Kretschmer, Royal Stag, Roy Robson, Silhouette, Vöslauer, Wüstenrot, X-ray. For several times, he was engaged by Dame Vivienne Westwood; in December 2013, she designed the costumes for the dancers at the Vienna New Year's Concert of the Vienna Philharmonic, Lindenhofer created the hair styling. Since 2005, he is responsible for the Celebrity Styling at the Life Ball in Vienna. Since 2013, Lindenhofer serves as a teacher at the University of Arts and Industrial Design in Linz.

== Film ==
- Vogelfrei, Hors la Loi, Outlaw (2011) - Make-Up Artist

== Accolades ==
- 2010 Vienna Fashion Award, category Hair Stylist
- 2013 Vienna Fashion Award, category Hair Stylist
