= Vienna Awards for Fashion & Lifestyle =

The Vienna Awards for Fashion and Lifestyle are dedicated to special achievements in Austrian fashion and fashion design. The awards were initiated by Marjan Firouz in 2009. Each year the ceremony constitutes a prestigious event in the center of Vienna, hosted by major television stars from Germany and Austria such as Sonya Kraus, with performances of up-coming singers such as Nevena Tsoneva. The winners of the international categories Style Icon and Global Citizen are invited to participate as honorary guests of the ceremony. There are also other stars coming to Vienna to participate.

== Selection, campaign ==
The winners are selected according to the structure developed by the Academy Awards. The winners of the previous three years select the winner of this year. There are only exceptions for the categories Best Designer, Tribute to Fashion & Lifestyle, Best Model and Style Icon who are selected by a committee.

Since 2011 the event is promoted every year with a theme campaign closely related to the city of Vienna and its history. In 2011, this fashion shooting was dedicated to the landmark Riesenrad and in 2012 to the beloved St. Stephen's Cathedral. In 2013, Emma Heming-Willis was invited to star as Empress Elisabeth of Austria. In 2014, Jerry Hall performed as a modern Queen of the Night from Mozarts The Magic Flute.

== Awards 2009–14 ==
	2009	2010	2011	2012	2013	2014
Designer	Petar Petrov	Thomas Kirchgrabner	Claudia Brandmair	Lena Hoschek	Meshit	Eva Poleschinski
Make up Artist	Oliver Szilagyi	Thomas Orsolis	Thomas Lorenz	Sergej Benedetter	Nicole Jaritz	Thomas Lorenz
Tribut to Fashion & Lifestyle	Palmers	Ludwig Reiter	Silhouette	Tostmann Trachten	Swarovski	Porsche Design
Photographer	Andreas Bitesnich	Günter Parth	Jork Weismann	Mario Schmolka	Stefan Armbruster	Julia Spicker
Fashion Editor	Petra Percher	Kira Stachowitsch	Stephan Hilpold	Margit Kratky	Daniel Kalt	Klaus Peter Vollmann
Stylist	Sammy Zayed	Sabina Schreder	Yoan Gonfond	Barbara Zach	Adia Trischler	Felix Leblhuber
Designer Branding	Lena Hoschek	Wendy & Jim	Gebrüder Stitch	AND i	–	–
Accessoire Designer	–	AND i	Nina Peter	Andy Wolf	Ring King	Bradaric Ohmae
Model	Franziska Knuppe	Iris Strubegger	Patrick Kafka	Ilvie Wittek	Gerhard Freidl	Florian Luger
Hair Stylist	Propaganda	Wolfgang Lindenhofer	Alex Moser	Patrick Glatthaar	Wolfgang Lindenhofer	–
Style Icon	Adriana Karembeu	Kiera Chaplin	Tatjana Patitz	Karolina Kurkova	Bar Refaeli	Coco Rocha
Global Citizen	-	-	-	-	Atil Kutoglu	–

== See also ==
- List of fashion awards
