= Patrick Kafka =

Austrian-American male model

Patrick Kafka (born 1989) is a former Austrian - American runway, magazine and advertisement model. He was signed to Q Management New York City and Stella Models at the age of 15.

== Life and work ==
His first job was a campaign for Abercrombie & Fitch, photographed by Bruce Weber in 2009, followed by assignments for Ralph Lauren and Trussardi. In June of the same year, Kafka had his début at Milan Fashion Week in fashion shows for Bottega Veneta, Dolce & Gabbana, Dsquared2, Jil Sander, Zegna und Moschino, as well as in Paris for John Galliano, Hugo Boss, Kenzo and Thierry Mugler. In September 2009, he was invited by Richard Chai and Michael Bastian to their runway shows in New York.

Since then, Kafka has been working with fashion photographers such as Arnaldo Anaya-Lucca, Sam Bassett, Inez van Lamsweerde and Vinoodh Matadin, Jem Mitchell, Sergi Pons, David Slijper and Milan Vukmirovic. He has appeared in men's magazines, such as Flaunt, the Italian edition of L'Officiel Hommes, the Japanese edition of GQ, the Spanish version of Esquire and the German edition of Playboy, often on the cover page. Amongst his clients are Armani, Balmain, Diesel, Perry Ellis, Thom Browne, Roberto Cavalli and Simon Spurr.

== Awards ==
- 2008 Supermodel Contest, Austria
- 2011 Vienna Fashion Award as Best Model
