= Florian Luger =

Austrian male fashion model (born 1994)

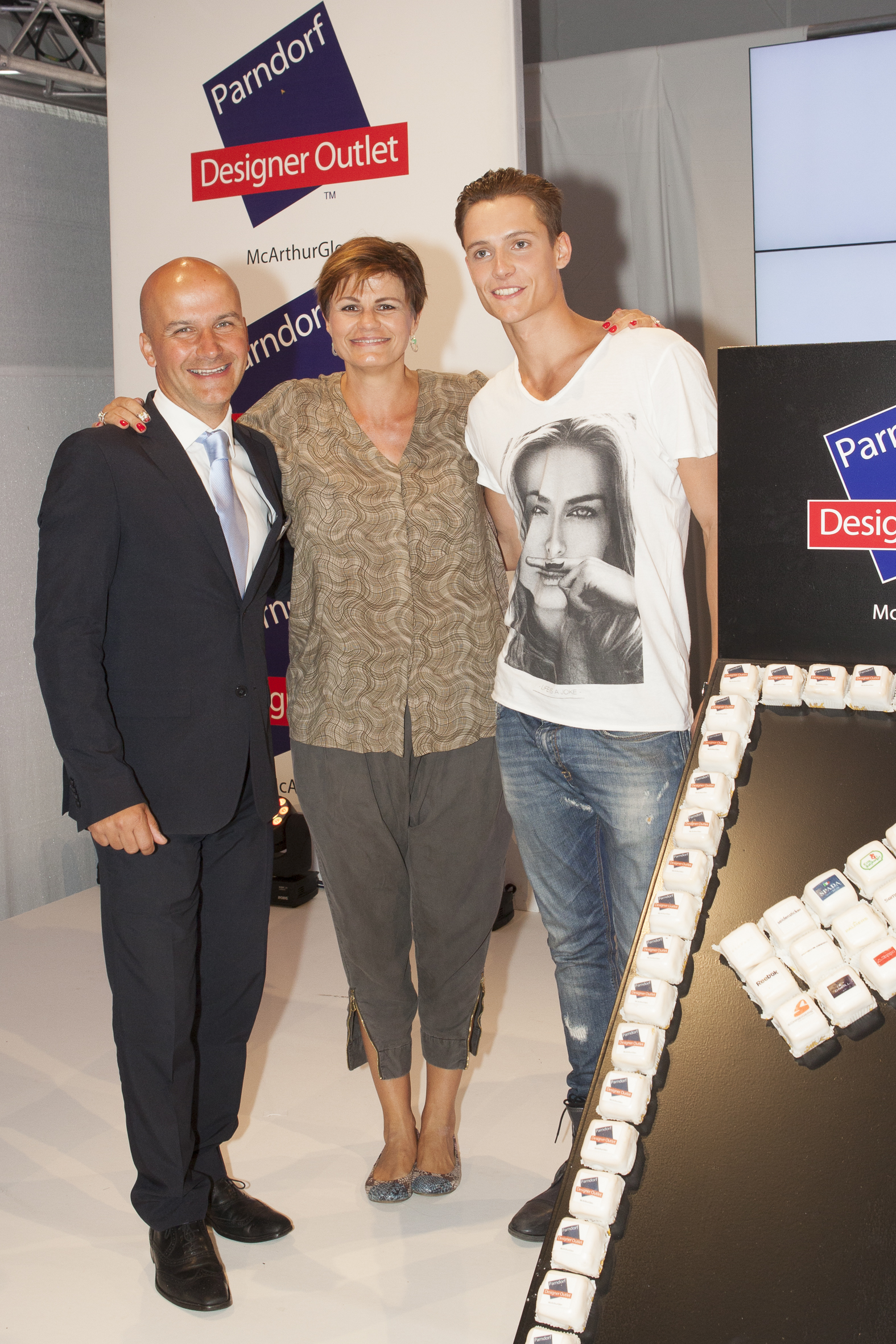
Florian Luger (right) in 2013

Florian Luger (born 22 May 1994) is an Austrian male fashion model.

== Life and work ==
Luger was discovered in 2012 at the finals of the Elite Model Look contest in Austria which he won. In January of the following year Luger was on the catwalk of Milan Fashion Week for Emporio Armani and in spring he walked for Bottega Veneta, Prada, and Gucci. He served as the opening face for Valentino menswear. He walked for Louis Vuitton, Dior Homme, and Kris Van Assche. He later also modeled for Fendi, the Spring/Summer 2014 campaign for Dior Homme, and a campaign for Tiberius. When asked about the trends in Paris that extremely slim male models were in demand, he replied tersely, "I would not go hungry for Paris." He has also walked for Moncler Gamme Bleu, Salvatore Ferragamo, Calvin Klein, Dolce & Gabbana, Burberry, Jimmy Choo, Topman, and other brands.

Luger completed compulsory military service and his studies at university, graduating in 2013. He is represented by the agencies View Management, Elite Paris, Elite London, Elite Milan, Elite Copenhagen, DNA Models, Stella Models, and Modelwerk.

== Awards ==
- 2012 Elite Model Look, winner of Austria finale
- 2014 Vienna Fashion Award for best model
