= Summer Day =

Single by Sheryl Crow

from the album 100 Miles from Memphis
- Released: June 21, 2010
- Recorded: 2009
- Studio: Henson Recording Studios (Los Angeles, CA); Electric Lady Studios (New York, NY)
- Genre: Pop
- Length: 3:56 (radio edit); 4:30 (album version)
- Label: A&M
- Songwriters: Sheryl Crow, Doyle Bramhall II, Justin Stanley
- Producers: Sheryl Crow, Doyle Bramhall II, Justin Stanley

Sheryl Crow singles chronology
| "Detours" (2008) | "Summer Day" (2010) | "Sign Your Name" (2010) |

"Summer Day" is a song written and recorded by American singer-songwriter Sheryl Crow. It was released as the first single from Crow's eighth studio album, 100 Miles from Memphis. Written by Crow, Doyle Bramhall II, and Justin Stanley, the song features a breezy, smooth tempo, with a noticeable dose of 1970s R&B influence. In the music video, Crow goes to the park during a sunny day, staging an intimate set with her band.

== Background ==
"Summer Day" is a delightfully breezy slice of glory-days AM radio pop. "I wanted to experiment with writing something simple and positive," says Crow. "The feeling of a great, solid love—not just a new love, but something everlasting."

== Critical reception ==
The song received positive reviews from music critics. Amar Too from AOL Music said that "'Summer Day' might just be the perfect, flagship single for your summer night drives, or evenings spent in your favorite rocking chair on the patio. . . . The track is guaranteed to provide that extra dose of summertime easiness we're all looking forward to". Jonathan Keefe from Slant Magazine classified the song as "an effortlessness song that is instantly likable and effervescent". The song was A-listed on BBC Radio 2 for the week commencing July 3.

"Summer Day" charted moderately in the United States, peaking at No. 3 on the Triple A chart and at No. 23 on the Hot AC chart, remaining in the chart for twelve non-consecutive weeks. However, the song met with success in Japan, where it peaked in the top 10.

== Music video ==
The music video for the song was shot in Nashville, and was released on July 14, 2010 on VEVO and was directed by Wayne Isham. Sheryl Crow commented that "[Her] friend Keith Megna made an amazing 'Summer Day' video for us – inspired by a great day in Central Park and our actual studio recording of the song."

=== Concept ===
The video captures people enjoying the summer are flashed while Crow delivers a groovy performance. Some are playing hula hoops and the others are either sitting on a bench while listening to music or canoeing in the lake nearby.

== Chart performance ==
Weekly chart performance for "Summer Day"
| Chart (2010–2011) | Peak position |
|---|---|
| Canada AC (Billboard) | 39 |
| Japan Hot 100 (Billboard Japan) | 7 |
| UK Singles (OCC) | 149 |
| US Adult Alternative Airplay (Billboard) | 3 |
| US Adult Contemporary (Billboard) | 23 |
| US Adult Pop Airplay (Billboard) | 36 |
| US Hot Rock & Alternative Songs (Billboard) | 42 |
| US Rock Digital Song Sales (Billboard) | 25 |

Annual chart rankings for "Summer Day"
| Chart (2010) | Rank |
|---|---|
| Japan Adult Contemporary (Billboard) | 51 |
