= The Clarence Greenwood Recordings =

Studio album by Citizen Cope
- Released: September 14, 2004
- Recorded: 2003–2004
- Genre: Alternative rock; folk
- Length: 47:12
- Label: RCA
- Producer: Clarence Greenwood

Citizen Cope chronology
Citizen Cope (2002)	The Clarence Greenwood Recordings (2004)	Every Waking Moment (2006)

The Clarence Greenwood Recordings is the third album by American recording artist Citizen Cope. It was released on September 14, 2004 via RCA Records. Originally, The Clarence Greenwood Recordings was scheduled to be released under Arista Records after he was pursued by the company where they bought out his contract with his former label, DreamWorks Records. Arista CEO L.A. Reid - who executive produced the album - left the label amid huge losses before it was released. The move made Citizen Cope an RCA signee when Arista was restructured in 2004.

On August 30, 2019, the RIAA issued a Gold certification for The Clarence Greenwood Recordings fifteen years after its initial release.

Professional ratings
Review scores
Source	Rating
Allmusic	1.5/5 stars

== Track listing ==
All the tracks were written and produced by Clarence Greenwood.

No.	Title	Length
1.	"Nite Becomes Day"	4:49
2.	"Pablo Picasso"	3:52
3.	"My Way Home"	3:07
4.	"Son's Gonna Rise" (featuring Carlos Santana)	4:01
5.	"Sideways" (featuring Carlos Santana)	5:19
6.	"Penitentiary"	4:07
7.	"Hurricane Waters"	4:24
8.	"D'Artagnan's Theme"	5:13
9.	"Bullet and a Target"	4:22
10.	"Fame"	4:30
11.	"Deep"	3:18
Total length:		47:12

== Personnel ==
- Clarence Greenwood – main artist, producer, drum machine, fender rhodes, guitar, keyboards, programming, synthesizer bass, turntables
- Rev. Brady Blade – drums
- Aaron Burroughs – handclapping
- Dennis Chambers – drums
- Danny Clinch – photography
- Preston Crump – bass
- Paul "Big Bird" Edwards – drums
- John Ginty – keyboards, organ, synthesizer, synthesizer strings
- Bashiri Johnson – percussion
- Manny Marroquin – mixing
- Alex McKinney – web design
- Meshell Ndegeocello – bass
- Michael Neal – bass, mixing
- Daniel Parker – handclapping, keyboards, piano
- Shawn Pelton – drums
- Neal Pogue – mixing
- Bob Power – bass
- James Poyser – keyboards, piano
- Steve Ralbovsky – A&R
- Keith Robinson – percussion
- Ricky 'Bongos' Galecki - Tour Manager, Production Manager, Live FOH audio engineer
- Carlos Santana – guitar
- Joshua Sarubin – A&R
- Mike Tocci – mixing
- Steef Van De Gevel – mixing
- Jason Yates – fender rhodes, organ
- Leon Zervos – mastering

== Certifications ==
Region	Certification	Certified units/sales
United States (RIAA)	Gold	500,000^{‡}
^{‡} Sales+streaming figures based on certification alone.
