= 100 Miles from Memphis =

Studio album by Sheryl Crow
- Released: July 20, 2010
- Studios: Henson Recording Studios (Los Angeles); Electric Lady Studios (New York City)
- Genres: R&B; Memphis soul
- Length: 59:35
- Label: A&M
- Producers: Sheryl Crow, Doyle Bramhall II, Justin Stanley

Sheryl Crow chronology
Home for Christmas (2008)	100 Miles from Memphis (2010)	Feels Like Home (2013)

Singles from 100 Miles from Memphis
- 1. "Summer Day" Released: June 21, 2010; 2. "Sign Your Name" Released: September 15, 2010; 3. "Long Road Home" Released: 2011

100 Miles from Memphis is the eighth studio album by American singer-songwriter Sheryl Crow. It is her final release for A&M Records. The album was written and produced by Crow, Doyle Bramhall II and Justin Stanley and features the musicians Tommy Sims and Chris Bruce. On this album she puts aside her country and pop-rock past in favor of a vintage R&B and Memphis soul-inspired record. Although proficient on such instruments as bass, piano and guitar, Crow concentrates on singing throughout the album. The album includes the covers: Citizen Cope's "Sideways", Terence Trent D'Arby's 1988 hit, "Sign Your Name", and The Jackson 5's "I Want You Back". This is the first of Crow's albums not to be nominated for any Grammy Awards (excluding Christmas and greatest hits releases).

== Critical reception ==
Professional ratings
Aggregate scores
Source	Rating
Metacritic	66/100
Review scores
Source	Rating
About.com	4/5 stars
AllMusic	4/5 stars
Austin American-Statesman	C+
Billboard	favorable
Entertainment Weekly	B
Los Angeles Times	2/4 stars
Mojo	4/5 stars
Rolling Stone	3.5/5 stars
Slant Magazine	2.5/5 stars
USA Today	3.5/5 stars

100 Miles from Memphis has received "generally favorable reviews" from 14 music critics, as Metacritic gave it 66 out of 100. Knoxville.com calls the album "sonically impressive" and Crow's "most ambitious release so far", although not impressed with her voice, noticing a disconnection with the sound; they gave the album 3.5 stars out of 5.

BBC also gave 100 Miles a positive review, calling it a "mix of white soul, rock, and reggae" and praising the partnership between Crow and producer Doyle Bramhall II. The album is considered to be a nostalgic move for Crow, for a time when soul had an upbeat message. Crow's excitement is noticed throughout the record.

Billboard magazine says "100 Miles is a path Crow was certainly wise to tread", praising her celebratory mind frame and the joyous mood of lead single "Summer Day", as well as "Peaceful Feeling" and first track "Our Love is Fading". Keith Richards' swagger is also noticed on the reggae field "Eye to Eye".

Mojo Magazine finds Crow in a peaceful state of mind, after adopting her two sons, Wyatt Steve and newborn Levi James. At 48, she finally "returns to her roots". Mojo praises producers Doyle Bramhall II and Justin Stanley (Amy Winehouse) in their pursuit of "shimmering Memphis sound" and calls ballads "Stop" and Crow's cover of "Sideways" two of her most "vulnerable and classy performances". The album is rated 4 out of 5 stars.

The album was made BBC Radio 2's "Album of the Week" for the week commencing July 10, 2010.

== Commercial performance ==
In the United States, 100 Miles From Memphis entered the Billboard 200 at number #3 with first week sales of 55,000 copies. It is Crow's eighth top 10 album.

In Canada, the album debuted at #2 on the Canadian Albums Chart, behind Eminem's Recovery. The album was less successful in the UK, once one of Crow's major markets, where it peaked at #34.

== Promotion ==
Crow promoted her new album through media appearances. In the United States, she performed the lead single, "Summer Day", on The Late Show with David Letterman, Good Morning America and Tonight Show with Jay Leno. She also appeared on Lopez Tonight and The View, where she performed "Sign Your Name" and "Long Road Home", respectively. In the UK, she made appearances on The 5 O'clock Show, Alan Titchmarsh Show and Later...with Jools Holland.

== Track listing ==
All tracks are written by Sheryl Crow, Doyle Bramhall II, and Justin Stanley, except where noted.

No.	Title	Length
1.	"Our Love Is Fading"	6:23
2.	"Eye to Eye" (featuring Keith Richards)	5:35
3.	"Sign Your Name" (featuring Justin Timberlake; written by Terence Trent D'Arby)	5:38
4.	"Summer Day"	4:29
5.	"Long Road Home"	4:14
6.	"Say What You Want"	4:50
7.	"Peaceful Feeling"	4:03
8.	"Stop" (written by Sheryl Crow)	4:40
9.	"Sideways" (featuring Citizen Cope; written by Clarence Greenwood)	5:11
10.	"100 Miles from Memphis"	5:01
11.	"Roses and Moonlight"	6:30
12.	"I Want You Back" (bonus track – For Michael With Love) (featuring Gary Clark Jr; written by Berry Gordy, Freddie Perren, Alphonzo Mizell, Deke Richards)	3:05

iTunes bonus track
No.	Title	Length
13.	"Long Road Home" (Acoustic version)	4:34

Barnes & Noble bonus tracks
No.	Title	Length
13.	"Summer Day" (Acoustic version)	4:28
14.	"Say What You Want" (Acoustic version)	5:22

QVC UK bonus disc
No.	Title	Length
1.	"All I Wanna Do"	4:34
2.	"Strong Enough"	3:12
3.	"Everyday Is a Winding Road"	4:17
4.	"If It Makes You Happy"	5:25
5.	"Soak Up the Sun"	4:52
6.	"The First Cut Is the Deepest"	3:42

== Charts ==
Chart (2010)	Peak position
Australian Albums (ARIA)	95
Austrian Albums (Ö3 Austria)	17
Belgian Albums (Ultratop Flanders)	56
Belgian Albums (Ultratop Wallonia)	41
Canadian Albums (Billboard)	2
Danish Albums (Hitlisten)	39
Dutch Albums (Album Top 100)	44
French Albums (SNEP)	155
German Albums (Offizielle Top 100)	46
Greek Albums (IFPI Greece)	26
Irish Albums (IRMA)	34
Japanese Album (Oricon)	34
Norwegian Albums (VG-lista)	19
Scottish Albums (Official Charts)	37
Spanish Albums (Promusicae)	77
Swiss Albums (Schweizer Hitparade)	17
UK Albums (Official Charts)	34
US Billboard 200	3
US Top Rock Albums (Billboard)	1
