= One Lovely Day =

Studio album by Citizen Cope
- Released: July 17, 2012
- Length: 35:02
- Label: Rainwater Recordings

Citizen Cope chronology
The Rainwater LP (2010)	One Lovely Day (2012)	Heroin and Helicopters (2019)

One Lovely Day is the sixth studio album by American musician Citizen Cope. It was released on July 17, 2012, via Rainwater Recordings, making it his second album for the label. It peaked at number 39 on the Billboard 200, number 11 on both the Top Rock Albums and Independent Albums charts, and number 24 on the Tastemaker Albums chart in the United States.

== Critical reception ==
Professional ratings
Aggregate scores
Source	Rating
Metacritic	63/100
Review scores
Source	Rating
AllMusic	3/5 stars
Consequence of Sound	D−
PopMatters	6/10

One Lovely Day was met with generally favourable reviews from music critics. At Metacritic, which assigns a normalised rating out of 100 to reviews from mainstream publications, the album received an average score of 63, based on four reviews.

AllMusic's Gregory Heaney wrote: "it's this kind of mellow eclecticism that has helped Greenwood to develop such a devoted following, and it's his music's sticky, molasses-like sweetness that keeps those fans coming back for more and more". Dan Mistich of PopMatters stated: "as one might expect, the vast majority of One Lovely Day is familiar territory, confirming that Cope's artistry is found not so much in inventing something radically new, but in refining and arranging various genres". Derek Staples of Consequence of Sound found the album "listens like an attempt to meet expectations, never attempting to push his abilities or the prevailing tastes of an already devoted fan base".

== Track listing ==
No.	Title	Length
1.	"One Lovely Day"	4:01
2.	"Something to Believe In"	3:41
3.	"Dancer from Brazil"	3:48
4.	"Back Then"	3:59
5.	"DFW"	2:44
6.	"Peace River"	3:23
7.	"For a Dollar"	1:43
8.	"Southern Nights"	3:36
9.	"A Wonder"	3:16
10.	"Summertime"	4:51
Total length:		35:02

== Charts ==
Chart (2012)	Peak position
US Billboard 200	39
US Top Rock Albums (Billboard)	11
US Independent Albums (Billboard)	11
US Indie Store Album Sales (Billboard)	24
