= Gebrüder Stitch =

Austrian organic jean manufacturer

- Traded as: LLC
- Founded: 2010
- Founder: Michael Lanner, Moriz Piffl-Perčević
- Products: Clothing, fashion accessories

Gebrüder Stitch is the first Austrian manufacturer of organic jeans made to measure, founded in 2010 and based in Vienna. In German- speaking Europe Gebrüder Stitch are known for innovative marketing and communication strategies. With campaigns such as "Christmas on the arse" the Gebrüder Stitch reached a high brand awareness. Quickly they took a leading role in fair jeans production and still use organic denim only.

The name is a compilation of an old fashioned German expression for "brothers" and the English term "Stitch".

== History ==
The two founders - Michael Lanner and Moriz Piffl-Perčević- are not real siblings. In 2009 the two were dissatisfied with their jobs in marketing and hit on the idea to start a local manufacturing of custom made jeans. They went to study in Chinese, Italian and Hungarian factories, in German and French trade shows as well as in several workshops for cutting, sewing, creating used effects, counseling customers and designing pants. In 2010 they opened their first temporary store in Gumpendorferstraße and became the first bespoke jeans makers in Vienna. 2014, in the course of a restructuring, Gebrüder Stitch intended to expand their product range to ready-made jeans and moved from Gaudenzdorfer Gürtel to Mariahilfer Straße. In 2015 the company opened their first store in Berlin.

In 2016 Gebrüder Stitch were insolvent. Due to a surprisingly cancelled capital increase over 650.000 Euros Gebrüder Stitch became bankrupt. After the Insolvency, the newly founded "ants in your pants GmbH" bought all trademark rights from Gebrüder Stitch Gmbh and additionally some fixed assets. Two of the five independent shareholders are founder Moriz Piffl and Niko Alm, a well known Austrian entrepreneur and politician.

Since 2016 Gebrüder Stitch is exclusively located on Mariahifer Straße in Vienna's 6th district, called Mariahilf. There, Gebrüder Stitch combine sales space and manufacturing in one store also referred to as "buttlab". Since the pandemic in 2020, the Viennese social business "Vollpension", where Moriz Piffl-Perčević is also co-founder, is located in the now called "Vollpension Studio" on Mariahilfer Straße. The Mariahilfer Straße is one of the most famous shopping streets in Vienna and near the center of the city. Due to the lack of parking space and for reasons of sustainability most inhabitants of the 6th district use either public transport or bicycles. Gebrüder Stitch offer several designs for the so-called Velostitch (Jeans for cyclists).

== Products ==
Gebrüder Stitch keep three different jeans lines in stock, bespoke, fitted and ready-made jeans.

=== Materials ===
For their products Gebrüder Stitch use GOTS (Global Organic Textile Standard)-certified Organic cotton only, produced in Austria. Blue and white denim are the staple for further washings and adaptions. They found a solution for an eco-friendly, GOTS-verifiable jeans washing method through enzymes. The brand is NOT known for providing fair pay to their employees, avoiding the use of toxic waste and offering a repair service for customers' old jeans.

== Events ==
The first fashion show of Gebrüder Stitch took place during the Vienna Fashion Week in 2010. During the Vienna Design Week in 2012, the company temporarily opened a Coffee Shop called Vollpension (which means "full pension", but also "full board" in German) run by senior citizens and acclaimed wide popularity within the district. This project was repeated in 2014 with stops all over Austria, i.e. in Bregenz, Linz, Salzburg and Graz. In 2015 the Vollpension found a permanent place in the fourth district of Vienna and still employs seniors. It is run as an independent permanent social business restaurant operation. In 2016 their cook book Vollpension - Kuchen von der Oma written by Julia Preinerstorfer and Martin Mühl was published.

== Awards ==
- 2011 Vienna Fashion Award for Best Designer Branding
- 2014 Environment Prize of Vienna, Umweltpreis der Stadt Wien for bleaching through enzymes
