= Cope Citizen =

Demo album by Citizen Cope
- Released: 1992
- Recorded: 1991–1992
- Genre: Alternative rock; hip hop; reggae
- Label: Use W/Out Permission

Citizen Cope chronology
Cope Citizen (1992)	Citizen Cope (2002)

Cope Citizen is the debut album by American recording artist Citizen Cope. It was recorded in late 1991 and early 1992 and released in 1992 limited to 500 copies.

== Track listing ==
No.	Title	Length
1.	"Cold Call"
2.	"Pipedream"
3.	"Busted"
4.	"The Watchdog"
5.	"Ol' Man vs. Hizself"
6.	"Drifter Prelude"
7.	"A Drifter Should Know"
8.	"Vices"
9.	"Cope-land"
10.	"The Rackett" (Instrumental)
