= Narco Cultura =

- Directed by: Shaul Schwarz
- Produced by: Jay Van Hoy; Lars Knudsen; Todd Hagopian
- Edited by: Bryan Chang; Jay Arthur Sterrenberg
- Music by: Jeremy Turner
- Production companies: Parts & Labor
- Release date: November 22, 2013
- Running time: 88 minutes
- Country: United States
- Language: English
- Box office: $145,088

Narco Cultura is a 2013 documentary film about the Mexican drug war in Ciudad Juárez, directed by Shaul Schwarz. The two main focal points of the movie are Edgar Quintero of the narcocorrido band Buknas de Culiacán and crime-scene investigator Richi Soto.

== Music ==
These songs were played throughout the documentary with the intention of guiding the audience through scene to scene. The film used several songs from that were written by different artists:

El Mini 6 is a song inspired by the life of Raúl Meza Torres, an assassin for the Sinaloa Cartel. His alias was "El Mini 6" and the song by Los Buknas de Culiacan recalls Raúl's life as an inspiration before his death in 2010.

== Reception ==
On review aggregator website Rotten Tomatoes, the film has an 89% approval rating based on 4 reviews, with an average ranking of 7.6/10. On Metacritic, the film have a score of 74 out of a 100 by 19 reviews, indicating "generally favorable reviews".

The Austin Chronicle's Marc Savlov awarded the film with 4 out of 5 stars, while Tomas Hachard of Slant Magazine gave it 3 out of 4.

Writing for the National Catholic Reporter, Sr. Rose Pacatte wrote "Narco Cultura is about a "disturbingly glorified conflict" that no one is paying attention to and how pop culture functions in society and in commerce. For people who care, it is a film not to be missed".

Peter Rainer of The Christian Science Monitor called the documentary as "powerful", adding that the film "gets inside the world of two men who, in very different ways, inhabit this horror".

According to Ignatiy Vishnevetsky of The A.V. Club, the film is "[b]oth an unflinching record of Mexico's drug war and an investigation of how violence becomes unreal and glamorized".

Following its screening at the 2013 Sundance Film Festival, Justin Lowe of The Hollywood Reporter said "This issue-based journalism piece yields diminishing returns the deeper it digs".

Stephen Holden of The New York Times was of the same view, he added "There is nothing here that hasn't been more thoroughly documented in other studies of the drug-related crime that grips Juárez".

Geoff Berkshire of Variety praised the film for being an "eye-opening examination" and for "its unsettling pop-culture side effects", calling Narco Cultura "overwhelming [and] absorbing".
