= Citizen Cope (album) =

Studio album by Citizen Cope
- Released: January 29, 2002
- Studio: Right Track Studios, Battery Studios, Shelter Island Studios, Sony Music Studios, Big House Studios, Worldbeat Studios, Sear Sound; New York City, New York; Hit Land; Alpharetta, Georgia; One World; Washington, D.C. Central Studios; Bladensburg, Maryland
- Genre: Soul; alternative rock; hip hop
- Length: 55:18
- Label: DreamWorks
- Producer: Bob Power; Clarence Greenwood

Citizen Cope chronology
| Cope Citizen (1992) | Citizen Cope (2002) | The Clarence Greenwood Recordings (2004) |

Citizen Cope is the second album by American recording artist Citizen Cope. It was released on January 29, 2002, making it his only album for DreamWorks Records. The record boasts a lengthy cast of session musicians, most of whom are veterans and produced by Bob Power.

The first single from the album "Contact" featured bass playing from Me'Shell Ndegeocello. Most of the bass on the album was played by Preston Crump, a session musician who was previously known for playing on songs produced by the production team Organized Noize. The song "Let the Drummer Kick" was featured in the 2006 ensemble comedy Accepted as well as the 2005 Samuel L. Jackson film Coach Carter. The track can be heard in the ending sequence of S1E12 of the CSI: Miami episode Entrance Wound, air date January 6, 2003. The track can also be heard in the "Cannes Kids' episode, season 4 of Entourage.

Professional ratings
Review scores
| Source | Rating |
|---|---|
| Allmusic | 4/5 stars |
| URB | 4/5 stars |

== Track listing ==
| No. | Title | Length |
|---|---|---|
| 1. | "Intro" | 0:31 |
| 2. | "Contact" | 4:22 |
| 3. | "If There's Love" | 4:24 |
| 4. | "Let the Drummer Kick" | 4:17 |
| 5. | "Mistaken I.D." | 4:12 |
| 6. | "200,000 (In Counterfeit 50 Dollar Bills)" | 3:04 |
| 7. | "Salvation" | 5:15 |
| 8. | "Hands of the Saints" | 4:44 |
| 9. | "Comin' Back" | 5:08 |
| 10. | "Appetite (For Lightin' Dynamite)" | 3:22 |
| 11. | "Theresa Prelude" | 0:58 |
| 12. | "Theresa" | 4:24 |
| 13. | "Holdin' On" | 6:27 |
| 14. | "Mandy" | 4:12 |
| Total length: | | 55:18 |

== Personnel ==
- Drums: Abe Laboriel, Jr., Jay Nichols, Paul "Buggy" Edwards, Omar Hakim, Aaron Burroughs
- Drum Programming: Clarence Greenwood, Bob Power, Michael "Funky Ned" Neal, Neal H. Pogue
- Bass: Me'Shell Ndegeocello, Bob Power, Preston Crump, Michael "Funky Ned" Neal, Daniel Parker
- Piano: John Ginty (acoustic), Bob Power (electric)
- Percussion: Bashiri Johnson
- Keyboards: Kenneth Wright, Bob Power, Clarence Greenwood
- Organ: John Ginty
- Guitar: Clarence Greenwood, Bob Power
- Turntable: John Connolly
- Cello: Jesse Levy
- Additional vocals: Michelle Lewis, Peter Davies
