= Sign Your Name =

Song by Terence Trent D'Arby

Single by Terence Trent D'Arby

from the album Introducing the Hardline According to Terence Trent D'Arby
- B-side: "Greasy Chicken"
- Released: December 28, 1987
- Genre: Soul
- Length: 4:37
- Label: Columbia
- Songwriter: Terence Trent D'Arby
- Producers: Martyn Ware, Terence Trent D'Arby, Howard Gray

Terence Trent D'Arby singles chronology
| "Dance Little Sister" (1987) | "Sign Your Name" (1987) | "Rain" (1988) |

Music video
- "Sign Your Name" on YouTube

Professional ratings
Review scores
| Source | Rating |
|---|---|
| Number One | 3/5 stars |

"Sign Your Name" is a song written and performed by American singer-songwriter Terence Trent D'Arby (now known as Sananda Maitreya), released as the fourth single (third in the US) from his debut album, Introducing the Hardline According to Terence Trent D'Arby (1987). The song was an international success, reaching number one on the Irish Singles Chart, number two on the UK Singles Chart, and number four on the US Billboard Hot 100. It was remixed by Lee "Scratch" Perry for some European releases. The music video was directed by Vaughan Arnell and was premiered in January 1988. The music video features model Kelly Brennan.

== Critical reception ==
Max Bell from Number One noted that the song finds D'Arby "in his quiet, sensitive, loving disguise, as opposed to his crafty, naughty, whoopsadaisy ma'am alter ego." He also felt that "Sign Your Name" "testifies at least to a knowledge of soul", and concluded, "From a Heaven 17 influenced beginning a fair single starts to brood but this could be a sucker punch rather than a knockout." Roger Morton from Record Mirror commented, "'Bop shoo wop wop/Bop shoo wap wap'. Terence has joined Showaddywaddy? Sadly not. This is the fourth single from the Hardline album, a crooner not a rasper, with some fine quavering from Tel's tonsils and a rhythm closely related to that of Scritti Politti's 'The Sweetest Girl'." Another editor, James Hamilton, wrote in his dance column, "Moodily shuffling sad 109/54 1/2-0bpm lament, not really for floors".

== Track listings ==
- US and UK 7-inch single; US cassette single
1. "Sign Your Name" – 4:45
2. "Greasy Chicken" – 4:40
- US 12-inch maxi-single
1. "Sign Your Name" (Extended Remix) – 5:48
2. "Sign Your Name" (Lee 'Scratch' Perry Remix) – 5:18
- UK and European 12-inch maxi-single
1. "Sign Your Name" (Extended Remix) – 5:48
2. "Greasy Chicken" – 4:40
3. "Under My Thumb" (Live) – 4:50
4. "Jumping Jack Flash" (Live) – 4:19
- Lee 'Scratch' Perry Remixes 12-inch single
1. "Sign Your Name" (Lee 'Scratch' Perry Remix) – 5:18
2. "If You All Get to Heaven" (Lee 'Scratch' Perry Remix) – 4:52
3. "Rain" (Lee 'Scratch' Perry Remix) – 2:54
4. "Greasy Chicken" – 4:40

== Charts ==
=== Weekly charts ===
| Chart (1988) | Peak position |
|---|---|
| Australia (Australian Music Report) | 3 |
| Austria (Ö3 Austria Top 40) | 7 |
| Belgium (Ultratop 50 Flanders) | 2 |
| Canada Top Singles (RPM) | 5 |
| Europe (Eurochart Hot 100) | 5 |
| France (SNEP) | 14 |
| Finland (Suomen virallinen lista) | 3 |
| Ireland (IRMA) | 1 |
| Italy Airplay (Music & Media) | 6 |
| Luxembourg (Radio Luxembourg) | 2 |
| Netherlands (Dutch Top 40) | 2 |
| Netherlands (Single Top 100) | 2 |
| New Zealand (Recorded Music NZ) | 13 |
| Spain (AFYVE) | 4 |
| Sweden (Sverigetopplistan) | 4 |
| Switzerland (Schweizer Hitparade) | 8 |
| UK Singles (Official Charts) | 2 |
| US Billboard Hot 100 | 4 |
| US Adult Contemporary (Billboard) | 13 |
| US Dance Club Play (Billboard) | 23 |
| US Hot Black Singles (Billboard) | 2 |
| US Cash Box Top 100 | 3 |
| West Germany (GfK) | 7 |

=== Year-end charts ===
| Chart (1988) | Position |
|---|---|
| Australia (ARIA) | 27 |
| Belgium (Ultratop) | 18 |
| Canada Top Singles (RPM) | 69 |
| Europe (Eurochart Hot 100) | 26 |
| Netherlands (Dutch Top 40) | 18 |
| Netherlands (Single Top 100) | 18 |
| UK Singles (OCC) | 32 |
| US Billboard Hot 100 | 58 |
| US Hot Black Singles (Billboard) | 24 |
| US Cash Box Top 100 | 41 |
| West Germany (Media Control) | 33 |

== Certifications ==
| Region | Certification | Certified units/sales |
|---|---|---|
| United Kingdom (BPI) | Silver | 200,000^{‡} |
^{‡} Sales+streaming figures based on certification alone.

== Release history ==
| Region | Date | Format(s) | Label(s) | Ref. |
|---|---|---|---|---|
| United Kingdom | December 28, 1987 | 7-inch vinyl; 12-inch vinyl | CBS | |
| United Kingdom | January 11, 1988 | CD | CBS | |
| Japan | June 22, 1988 | Mini-CD | Epic | |

== Sheryl Crow version ==
"Sign Your Name"

Single by Sheryl Crow

from the album 100 Miles from Memphis
- Released: September 15, 2010
- Length: 5:38
- Label: A&M
- Songwriter: Terence Trent D'Arby
- Producers: Sheryl Crow, Doyle Bramhall II, Justin Stanley

Sheryl Crow singles chronology
| "Summer Day" (2010) | "Sign Your Name" (2010) | "Coal Miner's Daughter" (2010) |

Music video
- "Sheryl Crow - Sign Your Name (Official Music Video)" on YouTube

Sheryl Crow released her rendition of the song in 2010 as the second single from her eighth studio album, 100 Miles from Memphis. It features Justin Timberlake on background vocals. The music video, directed by Wayne Isham, was released on September 16, 2010, through Crow's VEVO account.

=== Charts ===
| Chart (2010) | Peak position |
|---|---|
| US Adult Alternative Airplay (Billboard) | 18 |
