= Ghost Town (2008 film) =

2008 film directed by David Koepp

- Theatrical release poster
- Directed by: David Koepp
- Written by: David Koepp; John Kamps
- Produced by: Gavin Polone
- Starring: Ricky Gervais; Téa Leoni; Greg Kinnear; Billy Campbell; Kristen Wiig; Dana Ivey
- Cinematography: Fred Murphy
- Edited by: Sam Seig
- Music by: Geoff Zanelli
- Production companies: DreamWorks Pictures; Spyglass Entertainment; Pariah
- Distributed by: Paramount Pictures
- Release date: September 19, 2008
- Running time: 102 minutes
- Country: United States
- Language: English
- Budget: $20 million
- Box office: $27.1 million

Ghost Town is a 2008 American fantasy comedy film directed by David Koepp, who also co-wrote the screenplay with John Kamps. It stars English comedian Ricky Gervais in his first leading feature-film role, as a dentist who can see and talk with ghosts, along with Téa Leoni as a young widow and Greg Kinnear as her recently deceased husband. Gavin Polone produced the film for Spyglass Entertainment and Pariah, and it was distributed by Paramount Pictures under the DreamWorks Pictures label.

== Plot ==
In New York City, Frank Herlihy is accidentally killed by getting hit by a bus while trying to buy an apartment for his mistress. A short time later, anti-social dentist Bertram Pincus is dead for seven minutes under general anesthesia during a colonoscopy.

Afterwards, Bertram can see and communicate with ghosts, who pester him to help them with unfinished personal business. Frank promises to keep the other ghosts away if Bertram breaks up an engagement between his widow Gwen, a professional Egyptologist, and Richard, a human-rights lawyer who Frank says is dishonest. Bertram eventually agrees, trying to woo Gwen away from Richard. His past cold-hearted behavior towards Gwen makes it difficult, but he attracts her interest by analyzing the teeth of a mummified Egyptian Pharaoh she has been studying.

Bertram has dinner with Gwen and Richard, deciding that he is not so bad, but he himself begins to fall in love with her, and she enjoys his sense of humor. As Richard has a work emergency, Bertram and Gwen walk her dog and go for a drink. They share their sad stories of their last relationships, and Gwen reveals that she learned of Frank's mistress the day he died.

When Richard visits Bertram for some dental work, Richard mentions there was a little trouble between him and Gwen but Richard decides it's personal and won't discuss what's bothering him. So Bertram decides a little nitrous oxide would help and he learns that Gwen has broken their engagement. Frank doesn't understand why he is still on Earth if his "unfinished business" was to break up Richard and Gwen. Gwen, no longer engaged to Richard, accepts work at an archaeological dig in the Valley of the Kings for six months. As a going-away present, Bertram gets her a key chain from a fancy jeweler's, but he mistakenly reveals information about her that only Frank could have known. Gwen demands the truth, and Bertram tells her the whole story about the ghosts. She doesn't believe him and demands to know what Frank's worst nightmare was, and Frank lies to Bertram, leading Gwen to cut him off.

Bertram sinks into a deep depression when he asks his colleague Dr. Prashar for a prescription for pain medication and Dr. Prashar convinces him that his life would be better if he decided to stop being cynical and start helping people. Bertram begins helping the ghosts around him with their "unfinished business" on Earth, bringing comfort to people they left behind and enabling the ghosts to depart. As he does this he realizes that the ghosts were still on Earth not because they had unfinished business, but because the people they were close to were not finished with them.

Realizing Frank cannot leave because Gwen has not let him go, Bertram confronts her and while trying to persuade her to believe him about the ghosts, gets hit by a bus. Now a ghost himself, he watches with Frank as a crowd forms and Gwen sobs over him, and Richard arrives to perform CPR. Seeing how upset Gwen is and realizing she cares about Bertram, Frank gives him the piece of information Gwen asked him about earlier that he provided Bertram with the wrong answer to and finally leaves earth.

Bertram ultimately survives the accident. Some time later, Gwen stops by Bertram's exam room welcoming him back and telling him she decided not to go on the archeological dig. He asks about her dental issue, a problem with 'molar contact' and when she mentions she still has it, he welcomes her to his chair and she tells him she made an appointment with Dr. Prashar, to which he replies, he's a "lovely man" and "a better dentist, but don't tell him I said so." He then tells her of Frank's real nightmare—that of going into the forest with his father when he was 8 years old and getting separated from his father and losing his way home, which was the answer Frank finally told him. Bertram then assures her that Frank has "found his way home".

== Cast ==
- Ricky Gervais as Bertram Pincus, a disillusioned dentist who gains the ability to communicate with ghosts
- Téa Leoni as Gwen, an Egyptologist and Frank's widow
- Greg Kinnear as Frank Herlihy, an unscrupulous ghost who enlists Bertram's help
- Billy Campbell as Richard, Gwen's love interest, whom Frank warns is a "bad man"
- Kristen Wiig as Bertram's self-involved surgeon
- Dana Ivey as Marjorie Pickthall
- Aasif Mandvi as Dr. Prashar, Bertram's colleague
- Alan Ruck as the ghost of a family man; he competes with Frank for Bertram's attention
- Betty Gilpin as World War II Nurse
- Brian d'Arcy James as Irish Eddie
- Brian Tarantina as Ghost Cop
- Jeff Hiller as a naked ghost
- Michael-Leon Wooley as a medical attorney
- Aaron Tveit as the anesthesiologist
- Bridget Moloney as the receptionist
- Joey Mazzarino as food delivery guy

== Production ==
Filming took place on the Upper East Side of New York City. Regarding his character, lead actor Ricky Gervais said, "Just what America wants: a fat, British, middle-aged comedian trying to be a semi-romantic lead."

== Soundtrack ==
1. "I'm Still In Love (w/You)" – written and performed by Dusty Wright (aka Mark J. Petracca)
2. "I'm Looking Through You" – written by John Lennon and Paul McCartney, performed by The Beatles (opening title)
3. "The Heart of Life" – written and performed by John Mayer (ending title)
4. "What I'm Looking For" – written and performed by Brendan Benson
5. "Sabre Dance" – Written by Aram Khachaturian
6. "What I'm Looking For" – written and performed by Brendan Benson
7. "Sideways" – written and performed by Citizen Cope
8. "Which Way Your Heart Will Go" – written and performed by Mason Jennings
9. "Please Be Patient With Me" – written by Jeff Tweedy, Performed by Wilco
10. Original Score – composed by Geoff Zanelli

== Reception ==
=== Box office ===
The film opened at number eight at the North American box office making USD $5,012,315 in its opening weekend.

=== Critical reception ===
Reviews of Ghost Town were mostly positive. The film holds a score of 85% from 188 reviews collected by review aggregator Rotten Tomatoes, with an average rating of 6.9/10. The site's consensus states: "Ricky Gervais' consistently sharp performance and beautifully dry execution transform this otherwise mainstream comedy into an endearing, funny, and altogether snappy romantic comedy. With ghosts." Rotten Tomatoes gave it a Golden Tomato for Best Romance Film of 2008. On Metacritic, the film received a rating of 72 out of 100 based on 30 reviews, indicating "generally favorable" reviews. Audiences polled by CinemaScore gave it an average grade of "B+" on an A+ to F scale.

Roger Ebert gave the film three out of four stars in the Chicago Sun-Times, calling it a "lightweight rom-com elevated by its performances" and a "reminder that the funniest people are often not comedians, but actors playing straight in funny roles." Cosmo Landesman of The Sunday Times gave the film three stars (from five), calling it a "light comedy full of dark people" that's "never quite as funny as it needs to be" but which features a "fine performance" from Gervais.

Upon the film's March 2009 DVD release in the United Kingdom, Mark Kermode said "comparing Ghost Town with Woody Allen's 'early funny ones' may seem brash, but the gentle blend of absurdist fantasy, bittersweet romcom and deadpan physical humour evokes a string of enjoyable Allen escapades from the sci-fi slapstick of Sleeper to the ghostly charms of Alice."

=== Home media ===
Ghost Town was released in the United States on standard DVD and Blu-ray formats on December 27, 2008.

== See also ==
- List of ghost films
- Just Like Heaven
