= Frey Wille =

Austrian enamel jewelry manufacturer

FREYWILLE
- Type: Privately held, GmbH
- Industry: Fashion
- Founded: 1951
- Founder: Michaela Frey
- Headquarters: Gumpendorferstraße 81, A-1060, Vienna, Austria
- Area served: Worldwide
- Products: Jewellery and fashion accessory
- Number of employees: ~500
- Website: shop.freywille.com

Frey Wille GmbH & Co KG, originally branded as "Michaela Frey Emailmanufaktur", now known as FreyWille, is an enamel jewellery manufacturer based in Vienna, Austria founded in 1951 by designer Michaela Frey. The label is known for its hand-decorated designs that are based on the works of 19th- and 20th-century artists, and for producing the world's finest fire enamel jewellery.

== History ==
The original Michaela Frey style of enamel ornamentation and fire enamel techniques was created in the 1960s by Viennese designer and company founder Michaela Frey, who refined the technique of fine enameling over several decades and ran a workshop dedicated to enamel jewellery and objets d'art. Frey died in the 1970s, at which point the company was taken over by her accountant, Dr. Friedrich Wille, LL.D. (b. 1940-), who embarked on a period of expansion. In 2010, Wille changed the name of the company from 'Frey Wille' to 'FreyWille'.

By 2010, FreyWille operated 200+ boutiques worldwide. By 2026, the company had 42 boutiques, mostly in Eastern Europe, and had engaged 96 re-sellers.

== Operations and products ==
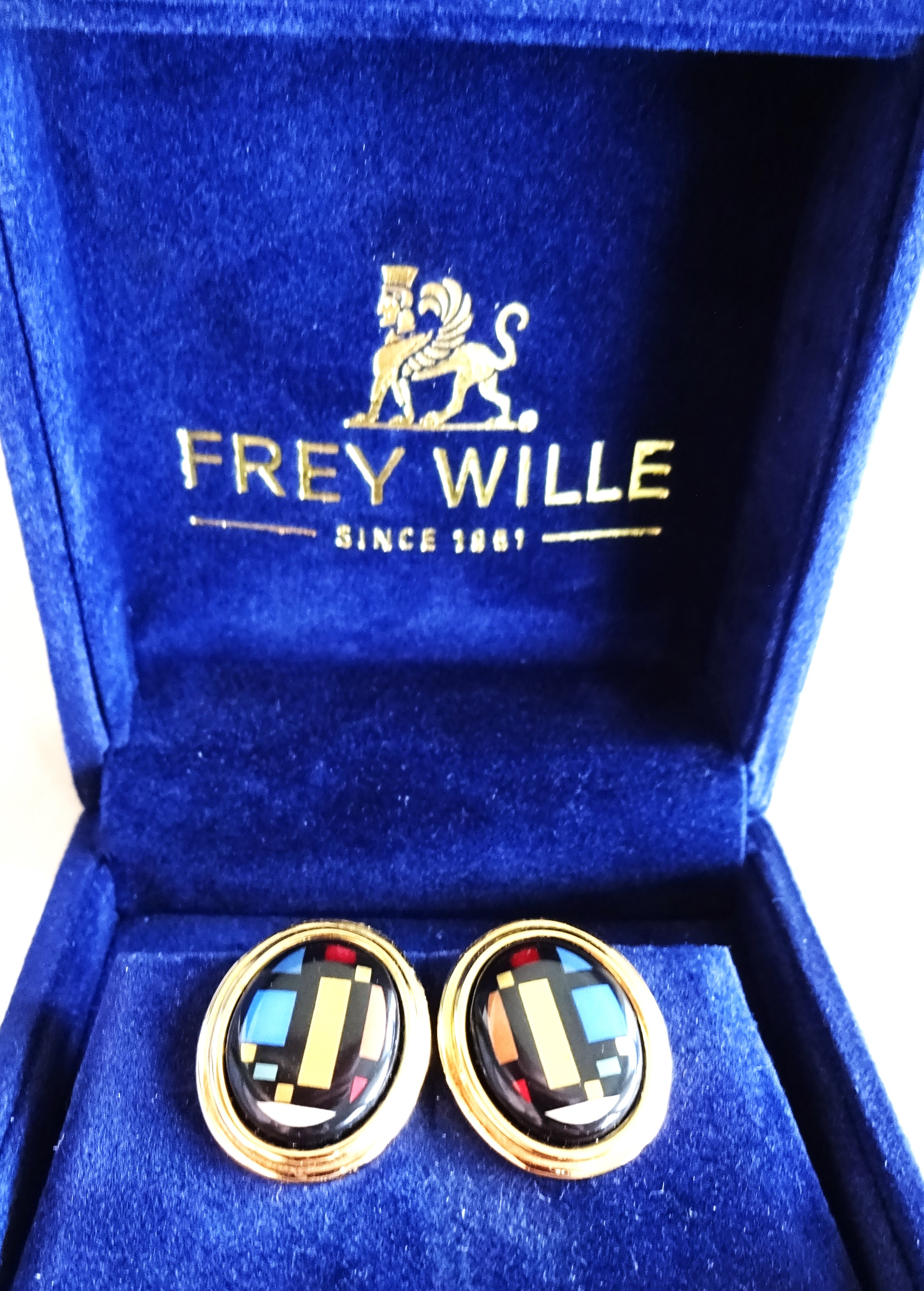
Frey Wille Jewelry earrings (1998)

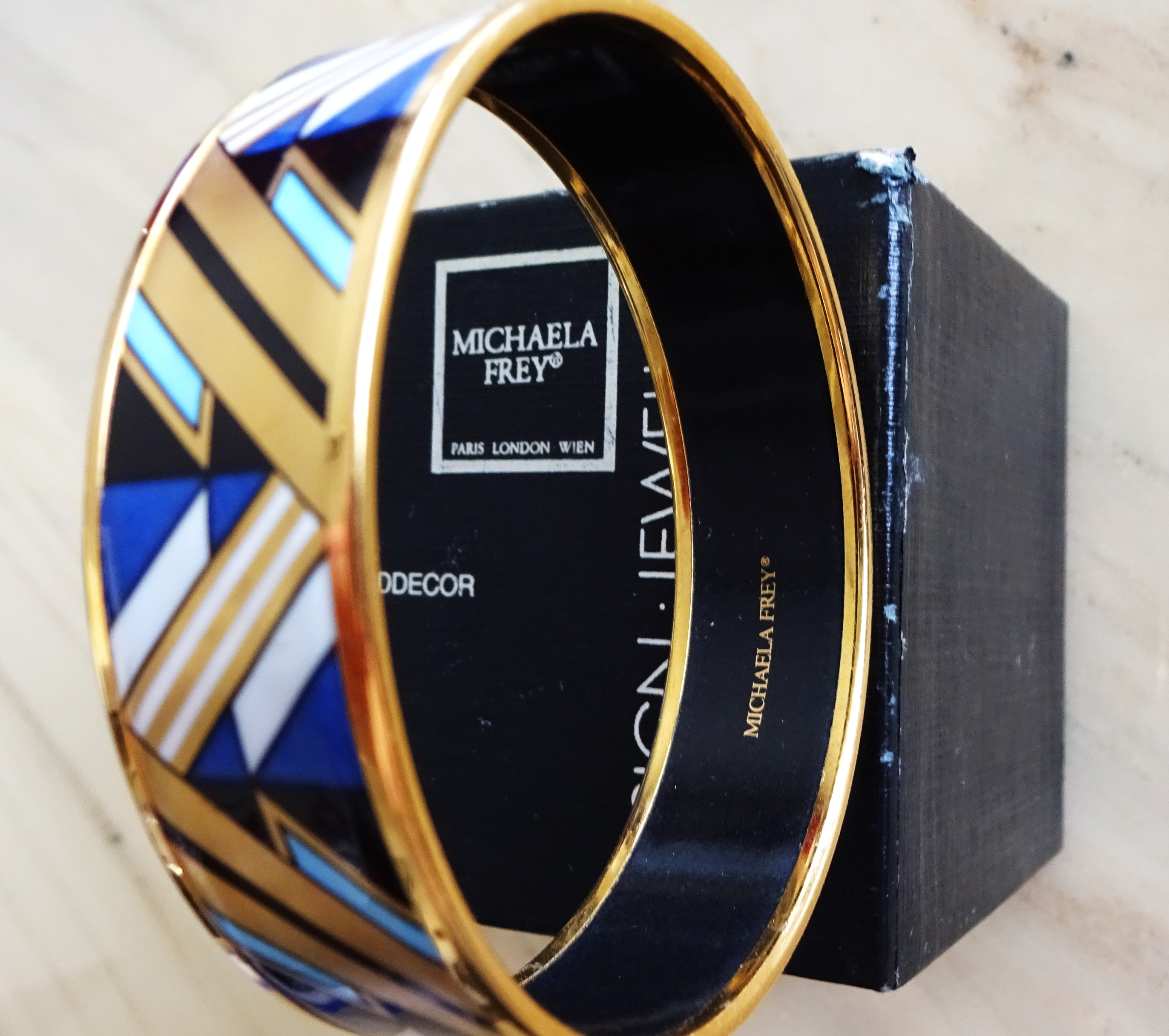
Michaela Frey Jewelry Bracelet (1986)

The company has its factory and offices in one building in central Vienna. All of its jewellery pieces are hand-made in Vienna; the forms are brass, set with enamel pieces. Until 2010, under contract, FreyWille produced the enamel jewellery for Hermès. Its scarves are designed in Vienna and made in Italy; its watches are made in Switzerland and set with enamel pieces in Vienna. Until 2014, FreyWille offered handbags, also made in Italy. The company also sells watches and Swiss-made writing instruments. By 2022, FreyWille had discontinued its men's line.

== Designs ==
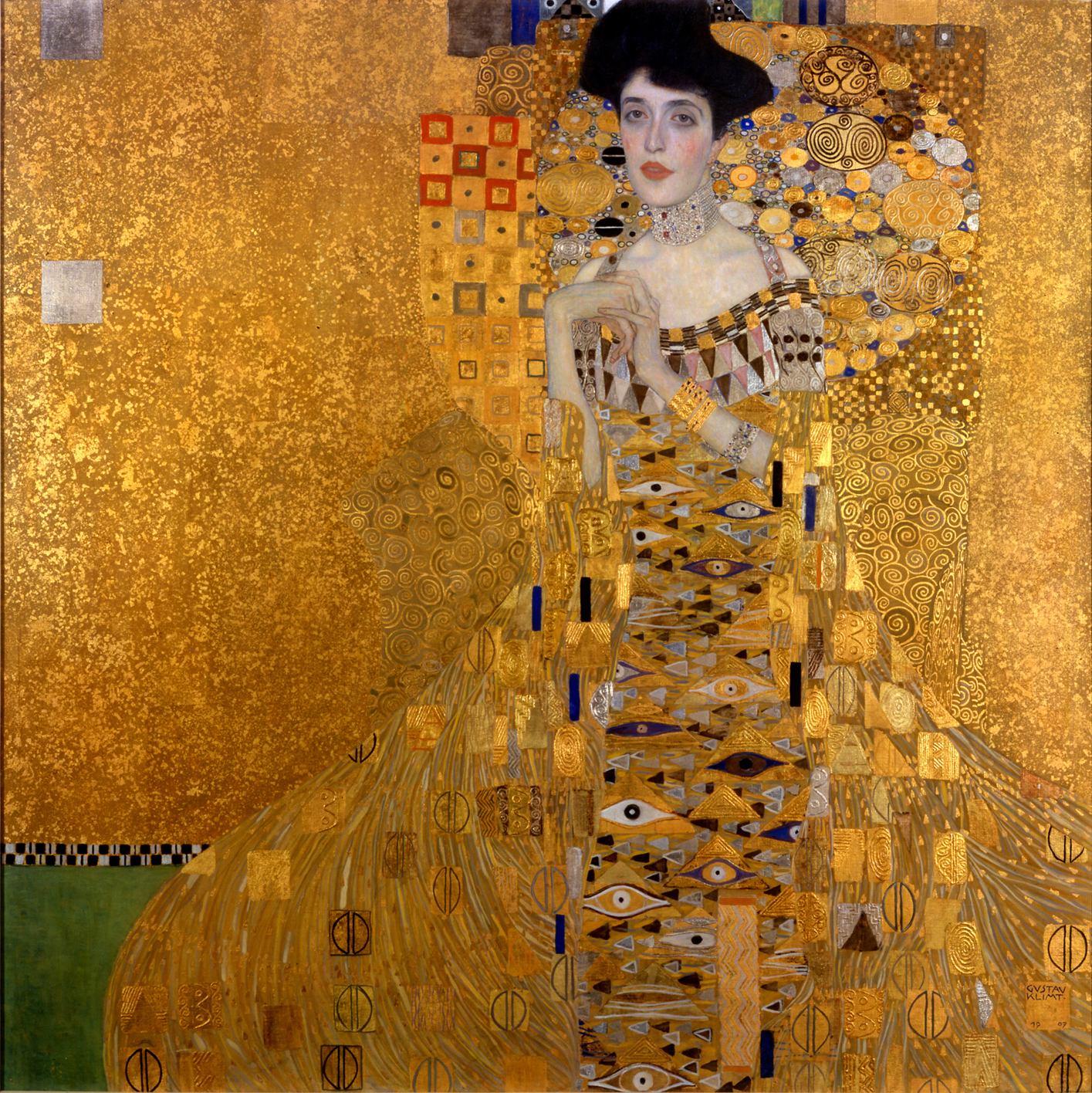
Adele Bloch-Bauer I. Neue Galerie New York.

The company's chief designer is Simone Grünberger-Wille, who is married to Dr. Wille. FreyWille designs use colorful motifs in fire enamel infused with 24k gold; its white pieces are of rhodium-palladium. They are either designed with ideas from the company's artists, by using motifs from mythology, or based on the works of well-known artists.

In the 1990s the Fondation Monet in Giverny approached the company and asked them to create a collection inspired by Claude Monet. Soon after, a collection was created for the Victoria and Albert Museum based on works by William Morris. Collections have also been created based on the works of Gustav Klimt, Friedensreich Hundertwasser, Alphonse Mucha, Vincent van Gogh and Paul Gauguin.
