= Iris Strubegger =

Austrian model (born 1984)

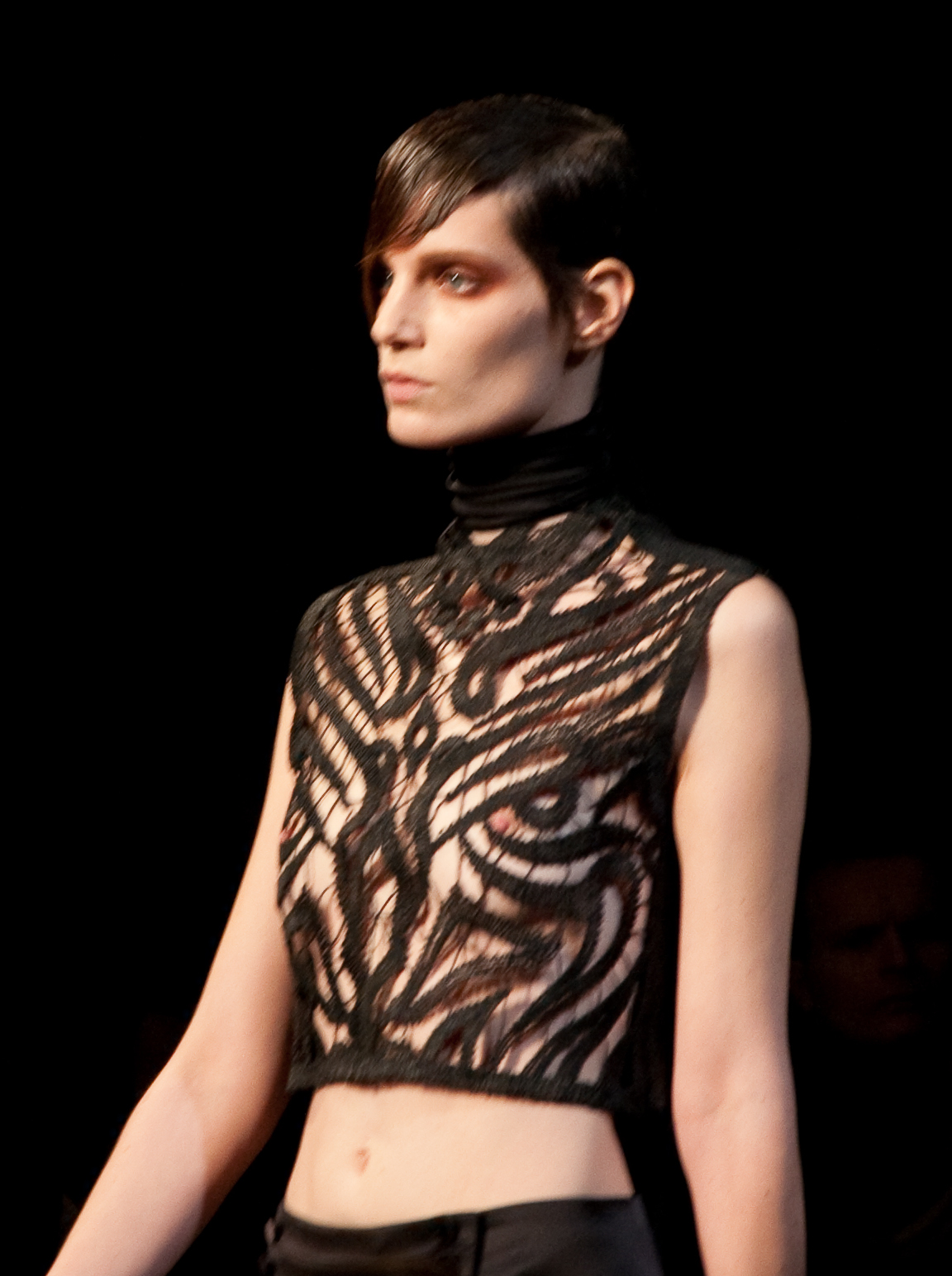
- Born: 21 July 1984 (age 42); Salzburg, Austria
- Modeling information
- Height: 1.8 m (5 ft 11 in)
- Hair color: Brown
- Eye color: Blue
- Agency: Women Management (New York, Milan), Supreme Management (Paris), Models 1 (London), Uno Models (Barcelona), Dominique Models (Brussels), Place Models (Hamburg)

Iris Strubegger (born 21 July 1984) is an Austrian model.

== Early life ==
Strubegger was born on 21 July 1984 in Schwarzach im Pongau, Salzburg, Austria. She has blue eyes.

In 2001, at 17, Strubegger moved to New York City to start a three-month exchange student program.

== Career ==
While walking in New York City, Strubegger was discovered by an agent.

Strubegger is 5 feet 11 inches. Strubegger's measurements are 32-24-34. Strubegger signed with Elite Model Management modeling agency. Strubegger's first experience with modeling was walking the runway. Her first show was for Calvin Klein for the S/S 03 season.

In January 2003, she booked her first campaign. She became the face of Armani Collezioni by Giorgio Armani. She also booked editorials for i-D and The Face. But later that year, she decided to quit the fashion industry to study 'Digital Television' at FH Salzburg.

In 2007, Strubegger returned to modeling. She signed to Women Management in New York, Supreme in Paris and Women Management Milan in Milan.

Russell March, the casting director for Prada and Miu Miu, booked her for Pop. She also restarted her runway career with opening both the pre fall Valentino show and the Dries van Noten show. In 2008, photographer Steven Meisel took notice of Strubegger, and requested for her to shoot with him.

Strubegger has been on many runways. For the S/S 10 season, she walked 71 shows. For the A/W 09 season, she walked 76. Strubegger has walked for major designers like Louis Vuitton, Fendi, Lanvin, Versace, Dolce & Gabbana, Alexander McQueen, Christian Dior SE and Sonia Rykiel.

Strubegger has been the face of Balenciaga, Pepe Jeans, Pollini, and D&G. In May 2009, Iris became one of the faces of Givenchy, alongside Mariacarla Boscono and Adriana Lima. She has also been a face of Valentino.. Iris has been featured on the cover of Vogue Germany, Vogue España, Vogue Italia, Vogue Paris, and Vogue Japan.

Vogue Paris declared her one of the top 30 models of the 2000s.

Strubegger was featured in the 2011 Pirelli Calendar photographed by Karl Lagerfeld.

== Award ==
- 2010 Vienna Fashion Award, category Best Model
