= Landoll =

American manufacturing company

Landoll is an American manufacturing company based in Marysville, Kansas, specializing in heavy flatbed recovery trailers and agricultural equipment. It was founded in 1960 by Don Landoll. Landoll, who had no formal education, founded the company aged 20, as Quick Service Welding. He quickly branched out into farm equipment, rebranding as Landoll in 1967, and producing stock racks for pickup beds, livestock feeders and plows. Landoll acquired Bendi and Drexel (forklifts), ICON scrapers and Brillion farm equipment.

By 1970, Landoll had designed and patented a trailer capable of ground-loading heavy equipment, using a traveling (sliding) axle which allowed the bed to be tilted by moving the axle forwards.
