= Manford W. Rainwater =

American politician

Member of the New Mexico House of Representatives
- In office 1950s–???

Personal details
- Born: September 10, 1913
- Died: November 20, 1997 (aged 84)
- Party: Democratic
- Education: University of New Mexico; University of Oklahoma

Manford W. Rainwater (September 10, 1913 – November 20, 1997) was an American politician. He served as a Democratic member of the New Mexico House of Representatives.

== Life and career ==
Manford W. Rainwater attended the University of New Mexico and the University of Oklahoma. He later served three terms in the New Mexico House of Representatives from the mid-1950s.

Rainwater died on November 20, 1997, of lung cancer at the age of 84.
