= XXXLutz =

Austrian furniture retail chain

XXXLutz KG
- Type: Limited partnership (Kommanditgesellschaft)
- Industry: Furniture retail
- Founded: 1945
- Headquarters: Wels, Austria
- Key people: Daniel Amlacher
- Revenue: €6.4 billion (2025)
- Number of employees: 27,300 (2025)
- Website: xxxlgroup.com

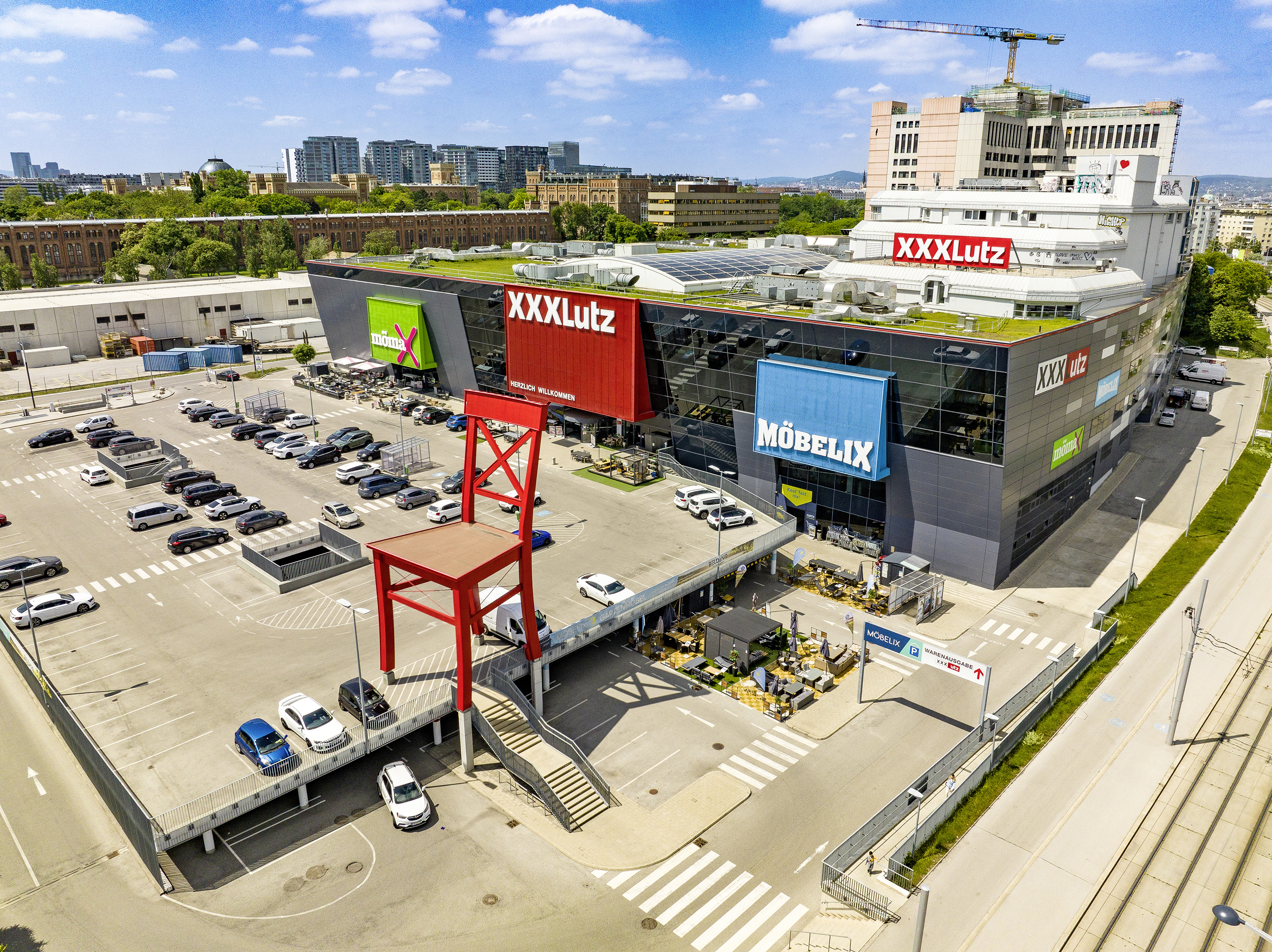
Lutz store in Vienna (2024)

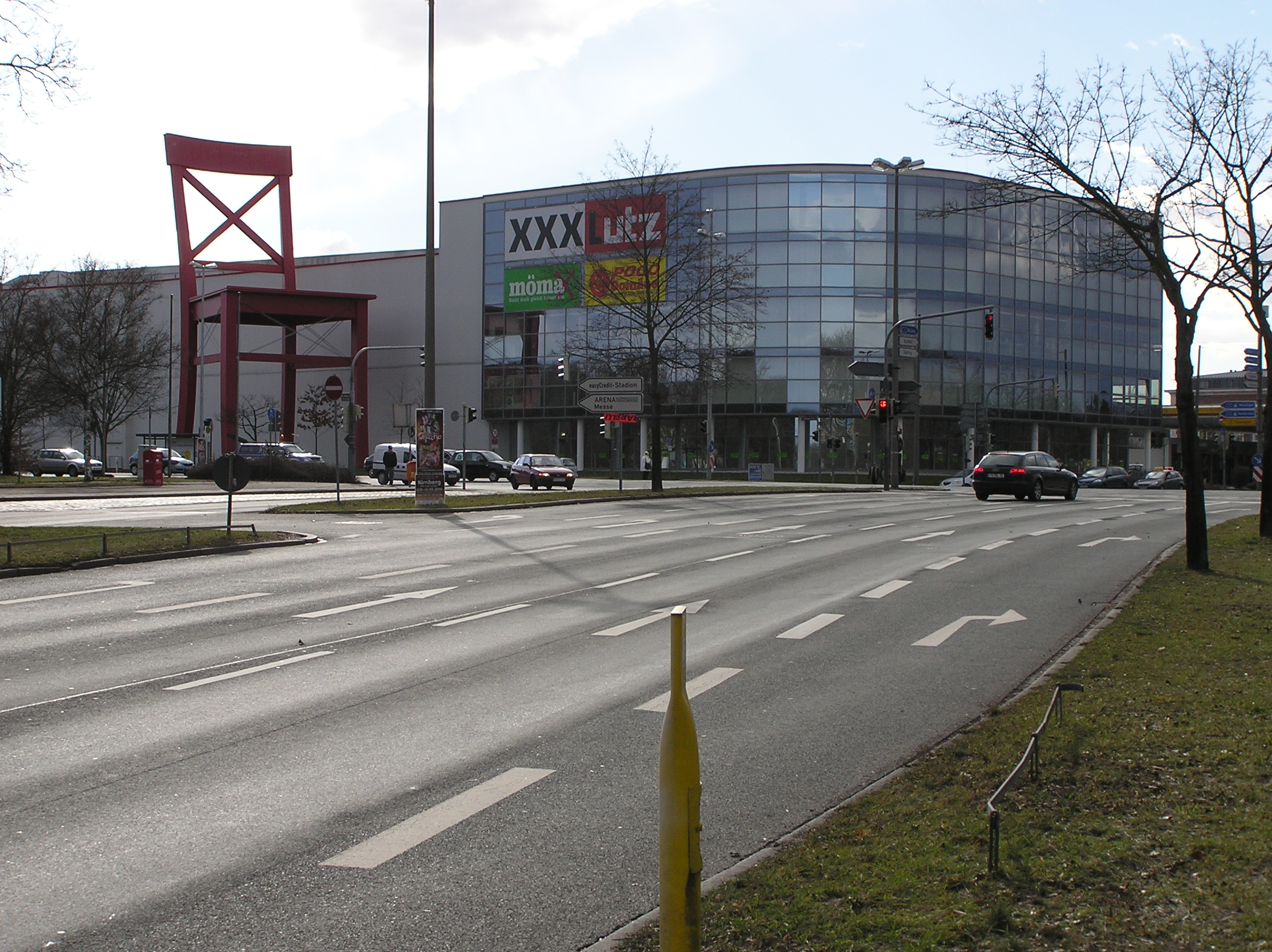
XXXLutz store with the Red Chair, Nuremberg (south-east side)

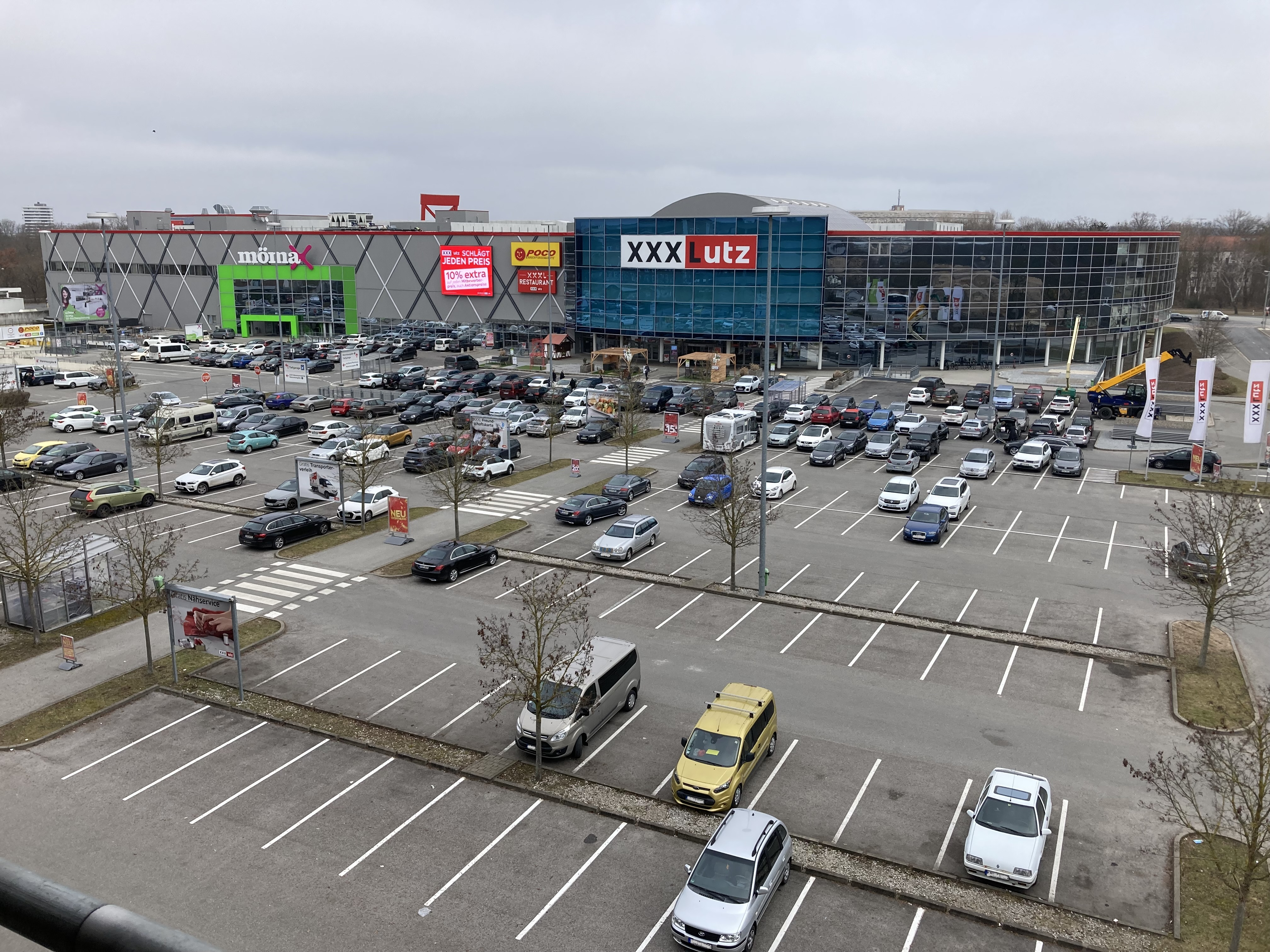
Main entrance and parking lot in Nuremberg (west side)

XXXLutz Group is an Austrian furniture retail chain. Headquartered in Wels, the company was founded in 1945 and operates furniture stores selling products such as furniture, home textiles, flooring, lighting, household goods and decorative items. The group is active across Europe under brands including XXXLutz, Aiko XXXL, Mömax, Möbelix and Poco.

== History ==
Gertrude Seifert (née Lutz) founded the company under the name Lutz in Haag am Hausruck, initially selling mainly farmhouse furniture and chipwood boxes as handcrafted single items. In the late 1950s, Lutz began producing low-cost furniture in larger quantities, transitioning from a craft producer and distributor into a furniture retailer. In the 1970s, sons Richard and Andreas took over the business, adopting a more aggressive pricing strategy and increasing both personnel and advertising budgets.

In 1973, the company began expanding through acquisitions and new openings. The first branch opened in Marchtrenk in 1975, followed by Wels in 1976 and Attnang-Puchheim in 1978.

In 1999, Lutz was renamed XXXLutz. In 2000, the furniture company Neubert, with stores in Würzburg and Hirschaid, was acquired; at the time of the takeover, Neubert had existed for more than 140 years.

In 2003, XXXLutz became Austria's largest furniture retailer by revenue and sales area, employing 8,000 employees and generating sales of €1.25 billion (against an Austrian furniture market of approximately €4 billion that year). The same year, the group was included in the Europe's Top 500 list of fastest-growing companies.

From 2005 onward, the group expanded further by acquiring the Mann Mobilia chain in Baden-Württemberg and additional stores in the Czech Republic and Slovakia, as well as the Karstadt furniture store in Munich. Two years later, the group acquired Hiendl, based in Passau with six stores in southern Germany. In 2008, the group took over two Sconto discount furniture stores in Hungary. In 2010, the company opened its first store in Malmö, Sweden – the home market of competitor IKEA – and acquired the South-East European chain Lesnina.

On 7 October 2013, XXXLutz closed a store for the first time, in Munich. All 160 employees at the branch were dismissed, and the closing-down sale until 30 November was handled by employees from other branches. No social plan could be agreed on until August 2014, and no severance payments were initially made to the dismissed employees; following mediation, the former employees ultimately settled with the former employer for a total of €2.1 million.

In February 2016, the Hiller-Kaserne in Linz-Ebelsberg was sold for €41 million to the WSF Privatstiftung, a foundation belonging to the group. On 1 February 2016, 99 employees at the XXXL Mann Mobilia central warehouse in Mannheim-Vogelstang were denied entry to their workplace and released from their duties; according to one employee's report, security personnel were deployed.

Since 2016, XXXLutz has worked with the US investor Clayton, Dubilier & Rice in France through a 50/50 partnership, jointly operating the But chain with 302 stores and €2 billion in revenue as of 2020. In 2017, a store opened in Bopfingen in the former Möbel Mahler premises, and Möbel Buhl in Fulda was acquired.

On 3 April 2018, XXXLutz opened its first Swiss store, in Rothrist. A year later, the Pfister Group was acquired, and the company took over six Interio stores in Switzerland from Migros, converting them to Mömax. The same year, 22 Kika stores in the Czech Republic, Slovakia, Hungary and Romania were acquired. In 2020, the group acquired a 50 percent stake in Roller, 20 Möbel Pfister locations, and the Hubacher, Egger and Svoboda stores.

On 8 July 2020, the company and a partner took over the French stores of the Conforama chain. Since 2021, the group has held shares in the online portal moebel.de.

In early 2022, XXXLutz acquired the LIPO chain in Switzerland. A second Swiss store under its own name opened in Dietikon on 2 August 2022. The same year, the group acquired a 50 percent stake in Braun Möbel-Center and approximately 92 percent of the online furniture retailer Home24, which had earlier completed the acquisition of the household-goods chain Butlers.

In 2023, Conforama Suisse was acquired, followed in September by the 59 Conforama stores in Spain and Portugal. The same autumn, the group agreed with the Tessner Group to integrate six Schulenburg stores and Tejo's SB Lagerkauf Schleswig; the latter was rebranded as a Mömax store.

In January 2025, the acquisition of the Porta Group was announced; approval from the German Federal Cartel Office is still pending as of early 2026.

== Corporate structure ==
Since 2009, the operational headquarters of the Lutz Group has been XXXLutz KG, based in Wels, which is held through the general partner XXXLutz Verwaltungs GmbH by two private foundations. Since the end of 2022, GW-Immo-GmbH, Wels, has held a 50 percent stake in XXXLutz KG. The internationally active group operates under the names XXXLutz Group or XXXL Group.

The group is one of Austria's largest furniture retailers by net revenue, generating €6.4 billion in revenue in the 2025 fiscal year. Its largest competitor in Austria is IKEA. Möbelix, Mömax and XXXLutz jointly operate 24 online shops for sales. XXXLutz KG is also a 20 percent owner of Giga International GmbH & Co. KG, a purchasing association founded by the group and based in Würzburg that bundles purchasing for all of the group's furniture retailers and shareholdings.

XXXLutz holds participations in several other furniture retailers. In Germany these include Home24 SE (95.96 percent, which in turn owns Home24 and Butlers), Roller (50 percent), the Tejo group (50 percent, including Schulenburg and Tejo's SB Lagerkauf), Braun Möbel-Center (50 percent), Zurbrüggen (50 percent), Möbelzentrum Pforzheim (50 percent) and moebel.de. In France, the group holds 50 percent of But International S.A.S, which owns But and Conforama France. In Poland, XXXLutz owns 50 percent of the BRW Group, parent of Black Red White.

== Brands and subsidiaries ==
As of 2026, the group operates more than 400 stores in Austria, Germany, Switzerland, Hungary, Romania, the Czech Republic, Slovakia, Sweden, Slovenia, Croatia, Bulgaria, Poland, Serbia, Spain and Portugal under the brands XXXLutz, Mömax, Möbelix, Poco, Porta, SB Möbel Boss, Asko, Möbel Letz, Conforama, LIPO, Pfister, Sparkauf, Svoboda, Möbel Hubacher, Lesnina XXXL and Aiko XXXL.

=== XXXLutz ===
XXXLutz operates its own furniture stores and has run its own online shop since 2014. A 30-metre-tall red chair, introduced in 2004 as the company's advertising trademark and placed in the parking lots in front of its stores, holds the Guinness World Record as the largest chair in the world.

=== Mömax ===
Logo of the XXXLutz subsidiary brand Mömax

The name Mömax is a portmanteau of Möbel (furniture) and maximal. The subsidiary was founded as a furniture discounter in Dornbirn, Austria in 2002. The first German Mömax store opened the following year in Hirschaid, Bavaria, followed by further locations in Austria, Germany, Hungary and Slovenia. Mömax has been active in online retail since 2009.

As of August 2026, Mömax operates 125 stores in ten European countries and employs more than 4,700 people. The company sells kitchens, furniture, home accessories, household goods and toys, and its stores are recognizable by their green façades with a pink X. In 2024, Mömax opened its first Citystore, a smaller downtown outlet of 2,500 square metres on Mariahilfer Straße in Vienna. In 2025, the entertainer and interior designer Bruce Darnell became the brand's ambassador. The Vöcklabruck store, which opened on 5 August 2026, is the chain's 24th location in Austria and has around 5,200 square metres of sales space and employs around 30 people.

=== Möbelix ===
Logo of the XXXLutz subsidiary brand Möbelix

The first Möbelix store opened in 1989 as a small-format discounter in St. Florian, Austria. In 2005, the brand entered online retail. Two years later, the XXXLutz Group took over four former Europamöbel stores in the Czech Republic and Slovakia, rebranding them as Möbelix in 2008. Further Möbelix stores opened the same year in Hungary, Slovakia, the Czech Republic and Croatia. The chain operates stores in Austria, the Czech Republic, Croatia, Hungary and Slovakia.

In 2006, the German Möbelix stores were merged with the acquired Domäne stores into Poco Domäne with the approval of the German Federal Cartel Office and were later rebranded as Poco.

=== Porta ===
In early 2025, XXXLutz announced the acquisition of the Porta Group, which includes the brands Porta, SB Möbel Boss, Asko and Möbel Letz.

=== Other holdings ===
Other companies that are or were owned or partly owned by the group include Möbel Engelhardt (2002), Möbel Krügel, Domäne (2005–2007, merged with Möbelix and then with Poco to form Poco Domäne, later renamed Poco; Poco has been half-owned by the group since 2008), Möbel Bierstorfer, Emslander in Landshut, Europamöbel and Möbel Hesse.

The group distributes its products primarily through brick-and-mortar retail, with its main activity in German-speaking countries. Central warehouses in the German-speaking region are located in Anzing, Sattledt, Zurndorf, Gottfrieding and Uffenheim-Langensteinach.

== Products and advertising ==
The range includes approximately 50,000 products. In addition to furniture, the company sells kitchens, mattresses, carpets, home textiles, baby products, lighting appliances, flooring, gifts, household goods and home accessories.

The advertising slogans are "Beim XXXLutz ist alles XXXL" in Germany and "Der XXXLutz, was der alles hat" in Austria. In Austria, the company has been advertising with the Familie Putz since 1999, a fictional family appearing in sitcom-style commercials. Since 2020, German actor Matthias Schweighöfer has been the brand's German testimonial. In June 2024, XXXLutz launched its own Austria-wide radio station, broadcast via DAB+ digital radio.

XXXLutz operates its own restaurant chain inside its furniture stores. Of the group's more than 400 furniture stores across 14 European countries, around half include a restaurant; there is also a stand-alone XXXLutz Restaurant in Vienna. Since 2022, the group's German restaurants have cooperated with the food-rescue platform Too Good To Go, selling surplus meals at the end of the day at reduced prices.

== Awards ==
In November 2025, the XXXLutz Group received five awards at the German Design Award 2026 in the "Excellent Product Design" category for furniture developed by its in-house design studio Axxxis, namely the seating range Veduta, the kitchen collection Milino, the sofa Coperta, the outdoor collection Mari and the Dieter Knoll kitchen. In the Market Markttest 2026, based on a survey of 1,000 people from the Austrian general population, XXXLutz ranked first among furniture retailers. The survey assessed brand strength, brand interest, Brand Drive, ESG and future fitness. XXXLutz also ranked first in the ESG category, which included social responsibility, sustainability and significance for Austria as a business location, and received the highest rating for customer advice.

== Controversies ==
XXXLutz has been criticised by labor representatives, including the German trade union Ver.di, regarding its corporate practices, particularly the use of a network of legal entities into which employees are outsourced. Allegations have included the obstruction of works councils, exceedance of working-time limits, and intimidation of employees.

The company has been criticised over a tax structure in which licence fees were charged by XXXLutz Marken GmbH in Malta to group companies, shifting profits to Malta, where an effective tax rate of about 5 percent applied after refunds. In 2014, the Greens submitted a parliamentary inquiry to Finance Minister Hans Jörg Schelling (ÖVP) regarding the tax loss to the Republic of Austria; the minister declined to comment, citing fiscal confidentiality. Schelling had been managing director of XXXLutz GmbH from 1992 to 2005 and a member of its supervisory board from 2005 to 2011.

In January 2018, a Mömax television commercial in which an approximately twelve-year-old girl said she was having sex with her teacher provoked public criticism and complaints to the Austrian advertising council. Austrian child-protection centres criticised that the abuse of minors and its consequences were trivialised. Election-themed commercials for the 2017 Austrian legislative election and 2019 election, featuring caricatures of party leaders, also drew complaints.

In July 2020, a XXXLutz restaurant promotion in Austria was criticised by farmers and animal-welfare advocates as a dumping of meat prices. Following talks with the Austrian Farmers' Association, XXXLutz announced that from January 2022 it would source pork exclusively from Austrian farmers under a contract with the Hütthaler butchery.

At the group's warehouse in Zurndorf, management was reported in October 2022 by moment.at to have prevented the establishment of the group's first works council in Austria by dismissing an employee shortly before his nomination as a candidate.
