= Simon Spurr =

British fashion designer

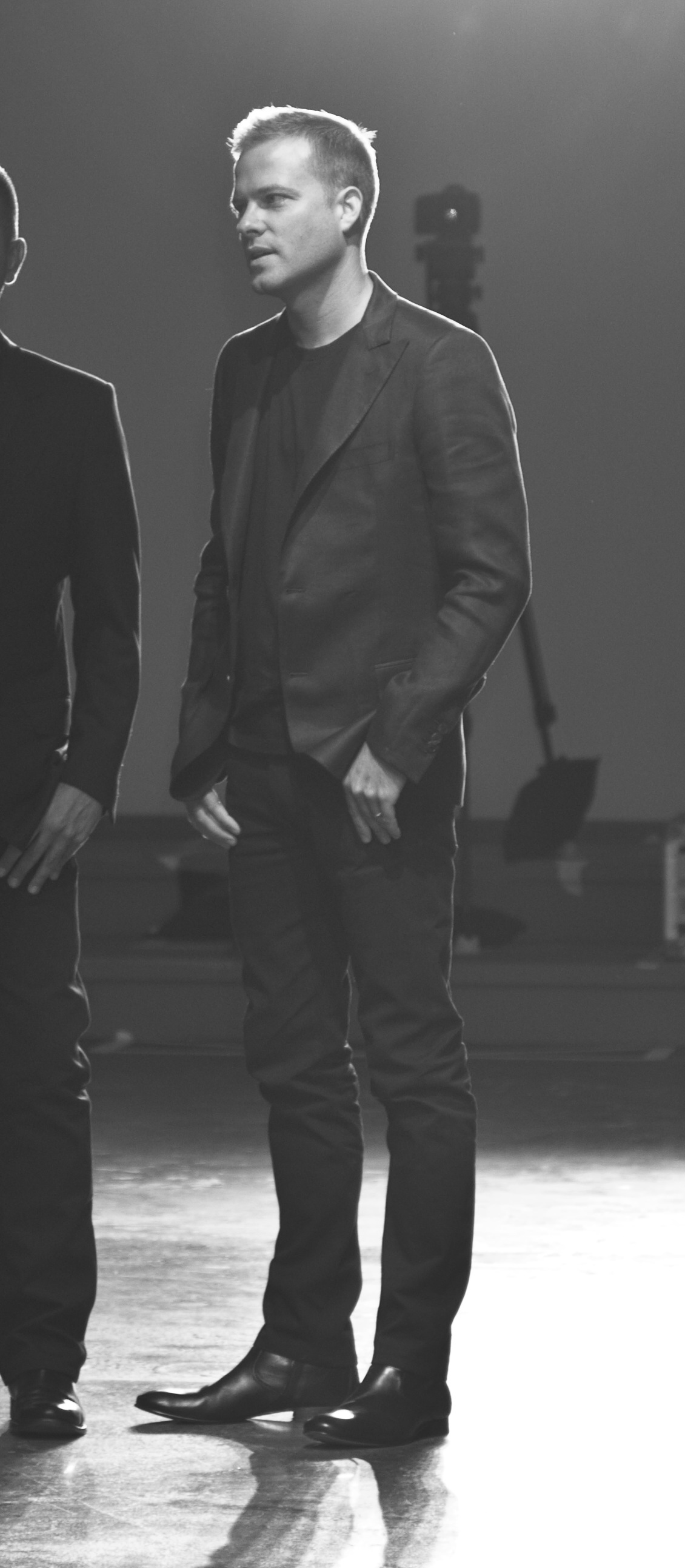
- Spurr in 2011
- Born: July 8, 1974 (age 52); Kent, England
- Education: Middlesex University
- Occupation: Fashion designer

Simon James Spurr (born July 8, 1974) is a British fashion designer based in New York City. He is the creative director and designer of shoe label March NYC.

== Early life ==
Simon Spurr was born and raised in Kent, England, the son of two bankers. His father's style shaped his design perspectives at an early age, as Spurr discussed in a 2011 interview:

I still look up to him... he's also very influential in my aesthetics. My dad had a lot of suits working in a bank, late '60s, early '70s. They still had the slim lapel, the narrow shoulder. And I guess it was subconsciously ingrained in me. That's the decade I always go back to.

Spurr went on to study Men’s Fashion Design at Middlesex University and graduated in 1996.

== Career ==
Upon graduation Spurr was hired to design menswear for Yves Saint Laurent, working under Hedi Slimane. He recounted working with Slimane in a 2010 interview: “One of the strongest memories I remember from working with Hedi, was him telling us to throw away the ‘trend books’ that are often used as guidance for younger designers. Set vision, don’t follow trend.” This left a lasting influence on the designer's approach to design: "I appreciate, I look, I listen, but on the whole I completely disengage from the rest of what's going on in fashion. I have a feeling, an emotion, that comes out in the form of clothes."

From YSL, Spurr was recruited by Calvin Klein in 2001 to be the head menswear designer, based in New York City. In 2003, he was named Design Director for Polo Ralph Lauren's Purple Label and Black Label ranges. During his tenure at Ralph Lauren, Spurr made the decision to start his own company; "I needed to make the choice between putting my feet under the table and enjoying the financial rewards associated with foreseeable promotion [at Ralph Lauren], or take an educated gamble and try to create something that would allow me to have freedom down the road for a family. It felt like my last chance to get out of the corporate world."

Spurr launched his menswear line, SPURR, in 2006 with American-made selvedge denim jeans. The line was immediately picked up by Bergdorf Goodman in New York City. In 2007, the line expanded to include sportswear, suiting, and accessories, establishing a full lifestyle brand. In 2009, the brand broadened even further with the creation of SIMON SPURR, a designer collection made entirely in Italy. Spurr described the clientele he designs for in a 2011 interview: “I design for a man that has awareness of life, culture, proportion and design. A diverse man that understands quality but also has a strong idea of his own sensibility.” After several well received presentations, Spurr held his first fashion show during New York’s Fall ’10 Fashion Week, in February 2010. Following the success of the shows and critical acclaim, Spurr was named creative consultant for the Tommy Hilfiger men's runway collection in November 2010.

Spurr has been touted for revitalizing the men's three-piece suit which includes his signature eight-button vest. He explained his thoughts on this in a 2011 interview: "Because [the vest] has this corset-like feel, it gives you better posture and you really feel you’re wearing something tailor-made and handcrafted." This aesthetic is inspired by a variety of influences, one specifically not straying far from his British roots;

"Tommy Nutter was an avant-garde tailor on Britain's Savile Row in the 60's /70's. He took the conventional notion of a bespoke 3 piece suit and turned it on its head using bold scales and mixing patterns. For me it [is] more about the notion of altering one's perception of the stereotypical image of the suit... The menswear that I make at SIMON SPURR is modern, elegant and yet carries a fresh spirit. I am bringing a very English look to New York Fashion week with a strong blend of style, functionality and also wearability. Ultimately, I think it’s my British roots that allows SIMON SPURR to stand alone in the American market."

Spurr's label was embraced by celebrities, many of whom wore his suits as he discussed in a November 2011 interview: "Simon Spurr [the brand], has hit its stride, so to speak. I think it’s really starting to resonate with the public. It’s always done well inside the world of fashion, but I think that the exceptional number of celebrity dressing we've done over the past year has really helped spread the word. There’s a whole new wave of American actors who are finding a new wave of American designers, and I happen to be one of them who does red carpet suiting quite well."

In January 2012, Spurr merged his two lines, SPURR and SIMON SPURR, to create a more expansive collection under the SIMON SPURR moniker. In March 2012, Spurr received a nomination for best menswear designer of the year from the Council of Fashion Designers of America, but abruptly announced that he was departing from his eponymous label just two days later. The New York Times attributed the split between Spurr and the investors that financed the label to a desire by the investors to make the label more commercial and less exclusive, something that the SPURR diffusion line hadn't been able to achieve.

He is the creative director and designer of shoe label March NYC.

== Awards and nominations ==
- 2007: awarded ‘Editor’s Choice Award for Best New Label’ by DNR
- 2008: awarded ‘Best New Menswear Designers in America' by GQ and CFDA
- 2009: nominated for the CFDA and Vogue Fashion Fund
- 2010: nominated for the CFDA's Swarovski Award for Menswear
- 2011: selected for the CFDA's "American's in Paris" exhibition
- 2011: nominated for CFDA's Menswear Designer of the Year
- 2012: winner of Rising Star Award, menswear by Fashion Group International
