= Citizen Cope =

American songwriter and producer

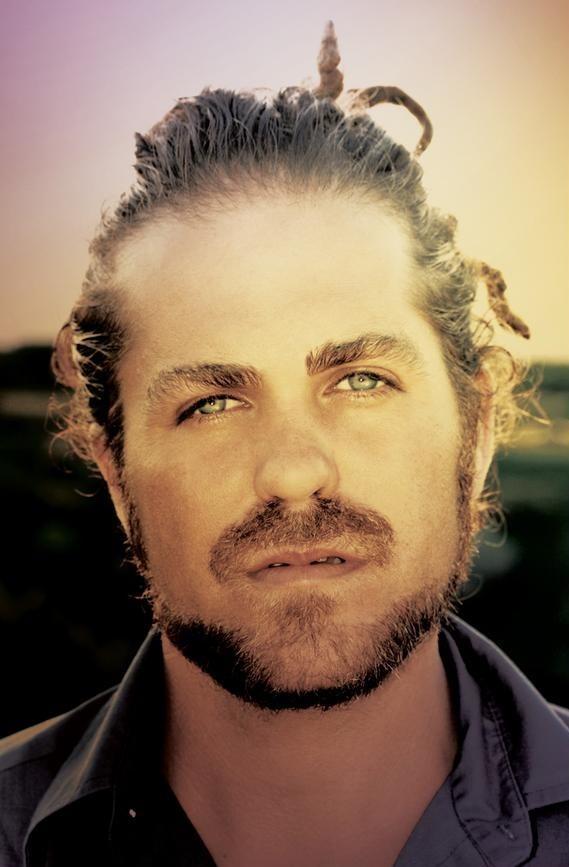

Background information
- Born: Clarence Greenwood; May 20, 1968 (age 58); Memphis, Tennessee, U.S.
- Origin: Washington, D.C., U.S.
- Genres: Alternative rock; alternative hip hop; soul; blues rock
- Occupations: Singer; songwriter; producer
- Instruments: Guitar; vocals
- Years active: 1991–present
- Labels: Capitol; Arista; DreamWorks; RCA; Rainwater Recordings
- Website: citizencope.com

Clarence Greenwood (born May 20, 1968), also known by his stage name, Citizen Cope, is an American singer-songwriter and producer. His music is commonly described as a mix of blues, soul, hip hop, folk, and rock. Citizen Cope's compositions have been recorded by Carlos Santana, Dido, Pharoahe Monch and Richie Havens. He currently records and produces for his own record label, Rainwater Recordings, which he founded in 2010. He had previously been signed to Capitol, Arista, DreamWorks and RCA. On March 1, 2019, he self-released his first album in six years, Heroin and Helicopters.

== Early life ==
Born in Memphis, Tennessee, Greenwood spent parts of his childhood in Texas and Mississippi, ultimately ending up in Washington, D.C., where he was primarily raised. He graduated from Wilson High School and attended Texas Tech.

== Recording career ==
Greenwood was initially the DJ for Washington, D.C.–based alternative rock band Basehead. He was signed to Capitol Records in 1997. In 2000, Citizen Cope signed with DreamWorks and released a self-titled album in 2002.

In 2004, he released The Clarence Greenwood Recordings, which he also produced. Every Waking Moment followed in 2006 (also self-produced), and debuted at No. 69 on the Billboard 200 chart. In 2007, he featured on the soundtrack of Trouble the Water alongside Massive Attack, Mary Mary, John Lee Hooker, The Roots, Dr. John and Blackkoldmadina. In 2010, Greenwood established his own record label, Rainwater Recordings. The move allowed him full creative control over his music and career. He released The Rainwater LP that year.

"Let the Drummer Kick" from his 2002 album Citizen Cope achieved RIAA gold disc status. Greenwood released his following album, One Lovely Day on July 17, 2012.

On March 1, 2019, his first album in six years, Heroin and Helicopters was released. He released his first single from the album, "Justice," on November 30, 2018.

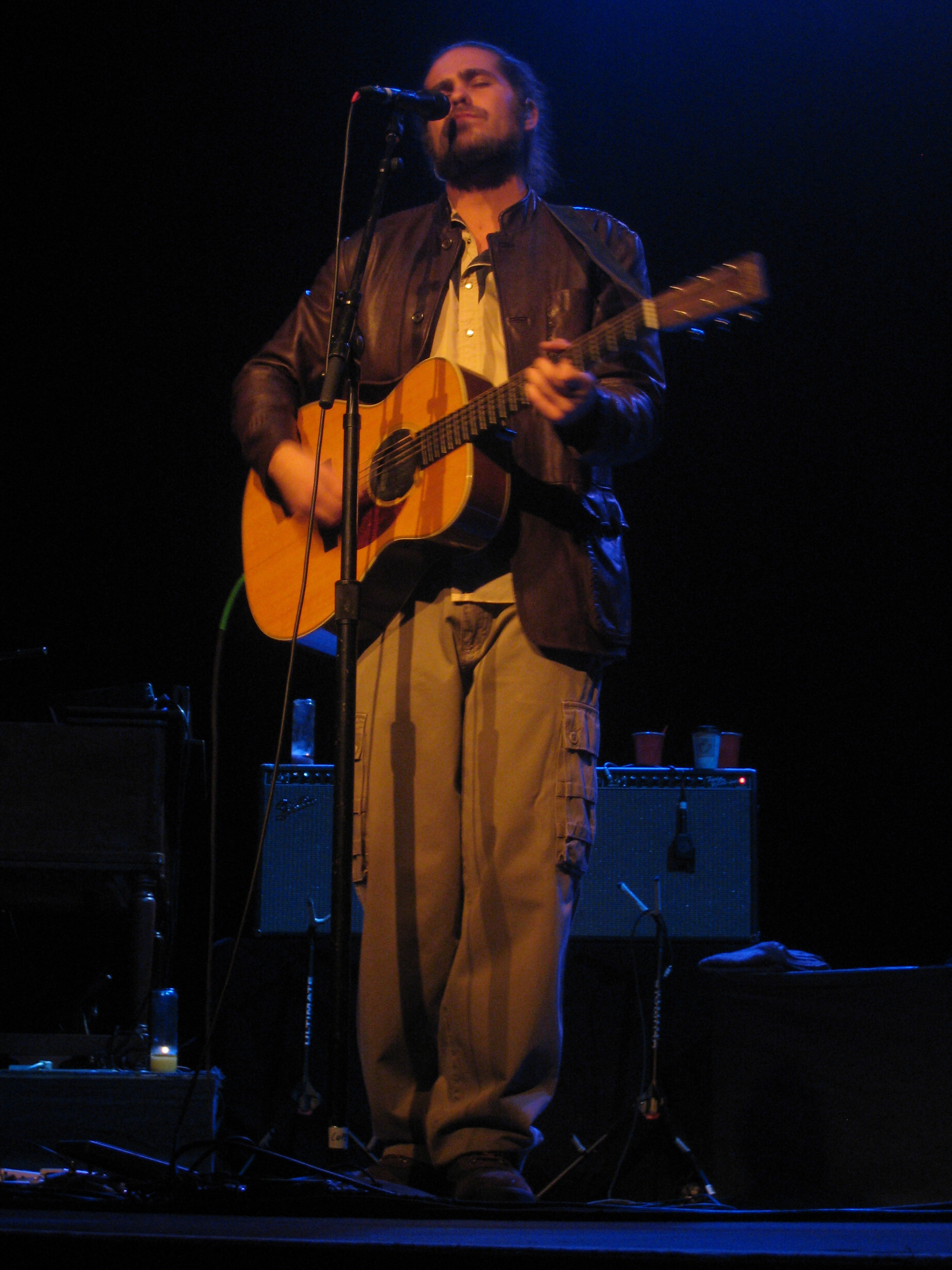
Citizen Cope in Seattle, Washington, in 2008

== Songwriting and producing ==
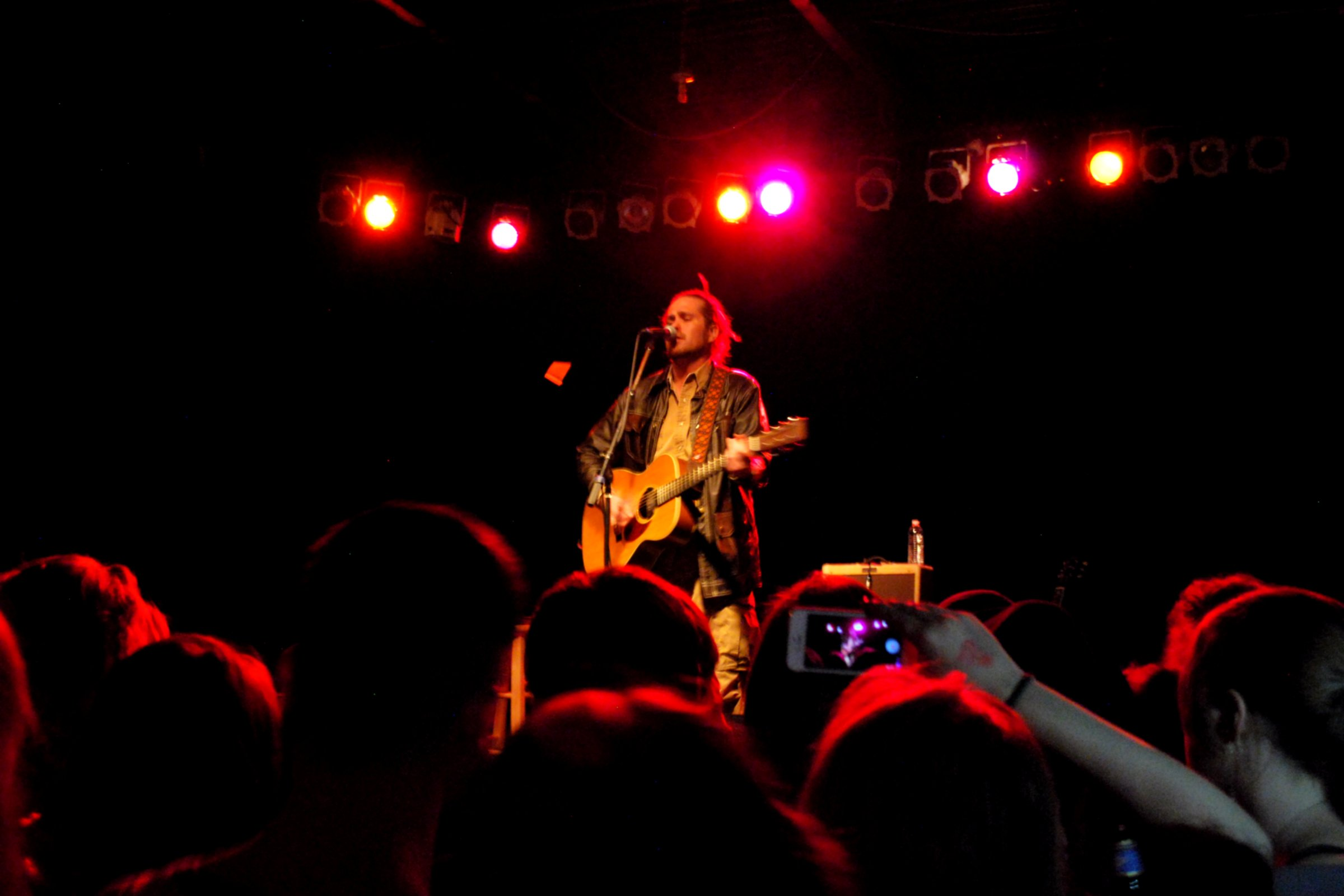
Citizen Cope performing at Cat's Cradle in Carrboro, North Carolina

Greenwood's work has been recorded by a number of musicians. In 2002, Santana recorded Cope's song "Sideways" for their Shaman album. He performed "Sideways" in concert with Santana on his 2003 European tour. Greenwood sang on and produced the track. Sheryl Crow asked to record the song in 2010 for her 100 Miles from Memphis album, and invited Greenwood to join her in concert on several occasions, including the Crossroads Guitar Festival in Chicago. At the same festival, Eric Clapton brought Greenwood onstage to perform "Hands of the Saints" together. Corey Taylor also recorded a version of the song. Brett Dennen recorded a version of the song "Healing Hands" for The Voice Project Presents Home Recordings Volume 1 in 2012.

In 2008, Greenwood wrote and recorded "Burnin' Love" with Dido for her Safe Trip Home album. That same year, Richie Havens released his version of "Hurricane Waters" and the hip-hop artist Rhymefest recorded "Bullet," featuring Greenwood.

His work appeared in a number of soundtracks to films including Trust the Man, Ghost Town, Coach Carter, Accepted, The Lincoln Lawyer, Fracture and Jamesy Boy. His song "Bullet and a Target" appeared in 2006's The Sentinel, Alpha Dog as well as in the television show, Cold Case. Greenwood's songs have also been included on Scrubs, One Tree Hill, Entourage, So You Think You Can Dance, and Smallville. "One Lovely Day" appeared in the film Battleship.

== Personal life ==
Greenwood lived in Los Angeles and Fort Greene, Brooklyn circa 2007-09. He is married to singer/songwriter Alice Smith.

== Discography ==
- 3 Song Demo (1990) (Cassette)
- Cope Citizen (1992) (500 copies)
- Asst. of Shells Remnants Of The Shotgun Trials. CD-R (1999) (100-300 copies+/-)
- Citizen Cope (2002)
- The Clarence Greenwood Recordings (2004)
- Every Waking Moment (2006) No. 69 U.S.
- The Rainwater LP (2010) No. 111 U.S., No. 10 U.S. Independent Albums
- One Lovely Day (2012) No. 39 U.S.
- Heroin and Helicopters (2019)
- The Pull of Niagara Falls (2021)
- The Victory March (2023)

=== Other contributions ===
- Live at the World Cafe: Vol. 15 – Handcrafted (2002, World Cafe) – "If There's Love"
- Vocals on "Karma Police" from the Easy Star All-Stars album Radiodread (2006), a complete reggae/dub cover of Radiohead's "OK Computer"
- "Let the Drummer Kick it " by Citizen Cope featured on soundtrack of Coach Carter film (2005)
- Contributed to the score of Trouble the Water film (2007)
- Duet with Dido on "Burnin Love" from her album Safe Trip Home (2008)
- "Way Down in the Hole" – Tom Waits cover
- Guest vocals on "The Grand Illusion (Circa 1973)" for the album W.A.R. (We Are Renegades) (2011) by Pharoahe Monch
- Turntablism on "Let The Drummer Kick" by DJ JVC
- Vocals for the song "Muse" by G. Love & Special Sauce from the album Love Saves the Day (2015)
- Background vocals and songwriting for the song "I Am Not a Lyricist" by Baby Keem from the album Ca$ino (2026)
