= The Rainwater LP =

Studio album by Citizen Cope
- Released: February 8, 2010
- Recorded: Brooklyn Recording/The Document Room (Malibu, CA), 2009
- Genre: Alternative rock; indie rock
- Length: 39:07
- Label: RainWater Recordings Inc.
- Producer: Clarence Greenwood

Citizen Cope chronology
| Every Waking Moment (2006) | The Rainwater LP (2010) |

The Rainwater LP is Citizen Cope's fourth studio album, released 8 February 2010 on Amazon MP3, and digitally released elsewhere on 9 February 2010, and in-stores on 2 March 2010.

== Overview ==
The album is produced by Cope (Clarence Greenwood) and it is the first record released under his own record label - RainWater Recordings Inc. He explained the reason for releasing it himself: "I kept hearing things like 'Retail's gonna need you to do this,' or 'The artwork has to be like this.' I don't want to be led into those confines anymore. I want to be able to do it my own way." The album's title is partially a reference to the commoditization of music, with musicians contractually obliged to provide a certain number of "LP"s; Cope stated "Now I'm not obligated to any record company, so I thought it was a nice play on that." The album was recorded between Brooklyn Recording (Cobble Hill, Brooklyn) and The Document Room (Malibu, CA) during the course of 2009 and in between Cope's extensive touring.

Cope worked on the album with musicians such as drummer Paul "Buggy" Edwards, legendary bass guitarists Michael "Funky Ned" Neal, and Preston Crump, keyboardist James Poyser (who previously has worked with acts such as The Roots, Jill Scott, and John Legend) and percussionist Bashiri Johnson.

The song "Keep Askin" was released as a free download on 14 June 2009 from the Citizen Cope website and announced as the first song from the forthcoming album.

On 19 January 2010, the first official single from the album, "Healing Hands" was digitally released via digital service providers.

== Track listing ==
1. "Keep Askin'" - 2:57
2. "Healing Hands" - 5:28
3. "I Couldn't Explain Why" - 3:43
4. "Lifeline" - 3:45
5. "Off the Ground" - 4:43
6. "Jericho" - 4:19
7. "The Newspaper" - 3:25
8. "A Father's Son" - 4:13
9. "Lifeline" (Barefeet version) - 3:47
10. "Keep Askin'" (Acoustic version) - 2:49

Initial Pressing / Limited Edition B-Sides CD:

1. "If There's Love" (Re-Recording)
2. "Sideways" (Re-Recording)
3. "Let the Drummer Kick" (Re-Recording)
4. "The Gambler's Theme" (Shotguns LP)
5. "Family" (Shotguns LP)

== Critical reception ==
Professional ratings
Review scores
| Source | Rating |
|---|---|
| Allmusic | 3.5/5 stars |
| MusicNow | 10/5 stars |

Alex Henderson of Allmusic gave the album a 3.5/5 rating, calling it "one of Greenwood's more consistent efforts". In the view of Hays Harris of Richmond.com, "The mix of rock, folk, blues and hip-hop elements" on the album formed "a defining portrait of considerable depth". Nancy Dunham of The Washington Examiner described it as an album that is "easy to fall in love with", calling it "Cope at his finest".
