= Silhouette (eyewear) =

Austrian eyewear brand

Coordinates: 48°15′31″N 14°17′14″E

Silhouette International Schmied AG
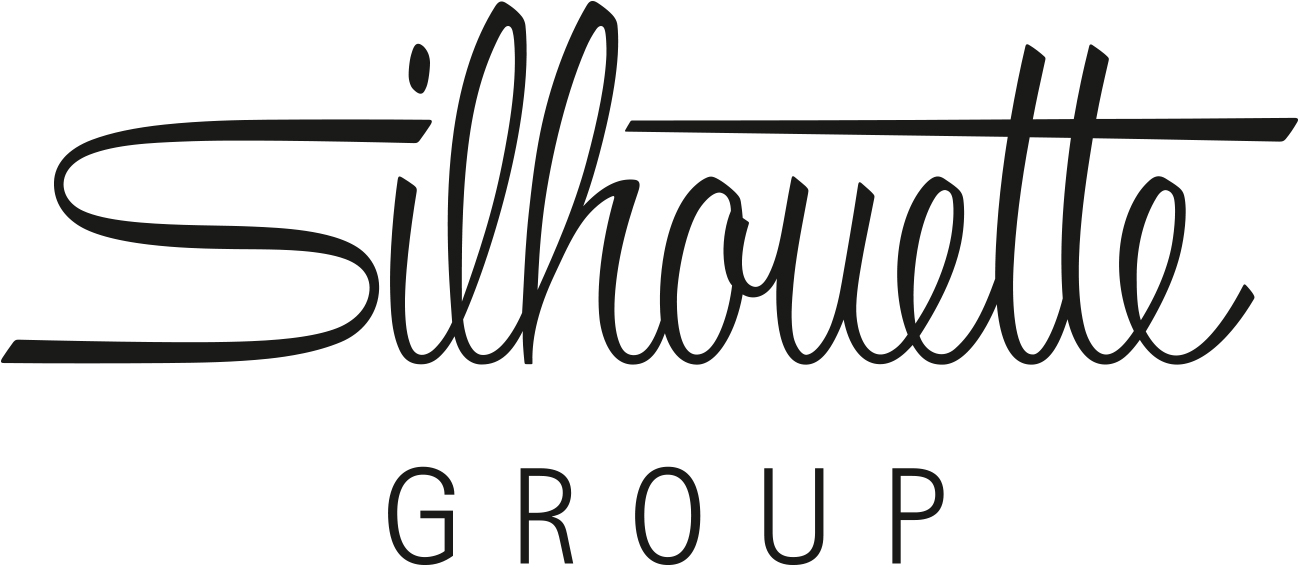
- Type: Public Limited Company
- Industry: Production and distribution
- Founded: 1964
- Founder: Anneliese and Arnold Schmied
- Headquarters: Linz, Upper Austria, Austria
- Key people: Executive Board: Reinhard Mahr; Michael Schmied; Thomas Windischbauer
- Products: Eyewear
- Revenue: € 160 million (2022)
- Number of employees: 1,300
- Website: silhouette-group.com

Silhouette International Schmied AG is an eyewear company headquartered in Linz, Austria. Since 2017, the company is a full-service provider for both frames and lenses.

Since 2008, the company has been a state-awarded training company.

== History ==
The Silhouette Group was founded in 1964 by Anneliese and Arnold Schmied.

In 1991, Silhouette began producing sports eyewear under the licensed brand Adidas.

In the 1990s, importers in Italy, the USA, England, Denmark, Germany and Belgium were converted into subsidiaries of the company.

In 2000, the company expanded to France and Southeast Asia. In addition, founder Arnold Schmied became part of the board of directors, and his sons Klaus and Arnold Schmied and Tassilo Gruber succeeded him as company managers. During the same time, Silhouette International A. Schmied GmbH. & Co. KG and former holding company Schmied Beteiligungs AG merged to form Silhouette International Schmied AG.

In 2002, the company expanded to Hong Kong and in the Asian region.

As of 2007, the company's top management consisted only of brothers Klaus and Arnold Schmied.

In 2008, expansion into Eastern Europe and the Near and Middle East began.

In 2009, Silhouette's licensing agreement with Swarovski, which had existed since 1996, ended.

In 2013, Arnold and Klaus Schmied retired from the operational business to the management board, and their board mandates were taken over by Thomas Windischbauer and Daniel Rogger.

In 2014, a new subsidiary was founded in South America.

In 2016, Silhouette's brand neubau eyewear was founded. Since the beginning of 2021, NEUBAU EYEWEAR is an independent company.

Since 2017, the company has been a full-range supplier of both lenses and frames.

Since 1 November 2019, Reinhard Mahr and Arnold Schmied's son Michael Schmied have been managing the family business alongside Thomas Windischbauer. At the end of 2019, the Silhouette Group ended its 25-year licensing agreement with Adidas and launched its own sports eyewear brand, evil eye.

== Company Structure ==
Silhouette is a third-generation family company under the Schmied name. The annual turnover in 2022 was €160 million. The company employs 1,300 people, including 700 in Linz. Exports account for 95 percent of sales, and the eyewear is available in more than 100 countries.

The company has offices in Belgium, the Netherlands, Luxembourg, Brazil, China, Germany, France, the United Kingdom, Hong Kong, Italy, Norway, Sweden, Denmark, Finland, Austria, Spain, Switzerland, the United States, as well as a regional office in Dubai and a second production site in the Czech Republic.

== Products ==
Silhouette manufactures and distributes rimless eyewear, full rim eyewear and sunglasses as well as lenses. For many years, Silhouette was a licensed manufacturer of sports eyewear for Adidas and Swarowski. Silhouette currently produces eyewear under three brands: Silhouette, NEUBAU EYEWEAR and evil eye.

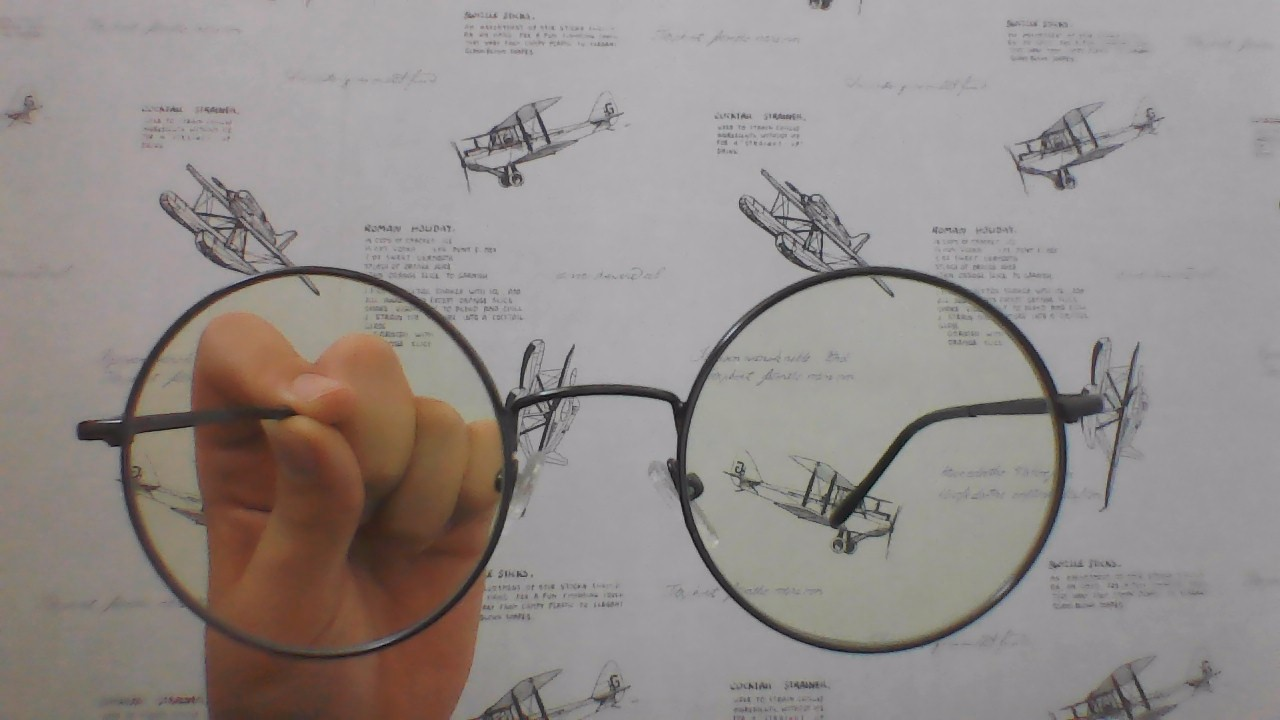
A Silhouette Frame In Someones Hand With Blue Cut Lensess

Since 2000, the company's screwless and hingeless Titan Minimal Art eyewear has been certified for space travel and has been used on more than 70 space missions to date.

=== Materials ===
Silhouette uses high-tech titanium and patented plastic SPX to manufacture its eyewear. In 1983, Silhouette began producing eyewear from SPX using injection molding technology. Since 2020, NEUBAU EYEWEAR has been using bio-based material in 3D printing technology.

== Sustainability ==
As a Climate Alliance company, the Silhouette Group is a member of Climate Alliance Austria.
