= List of awards and nominations received by Maren Morris =

Maren Morris awards and nominations
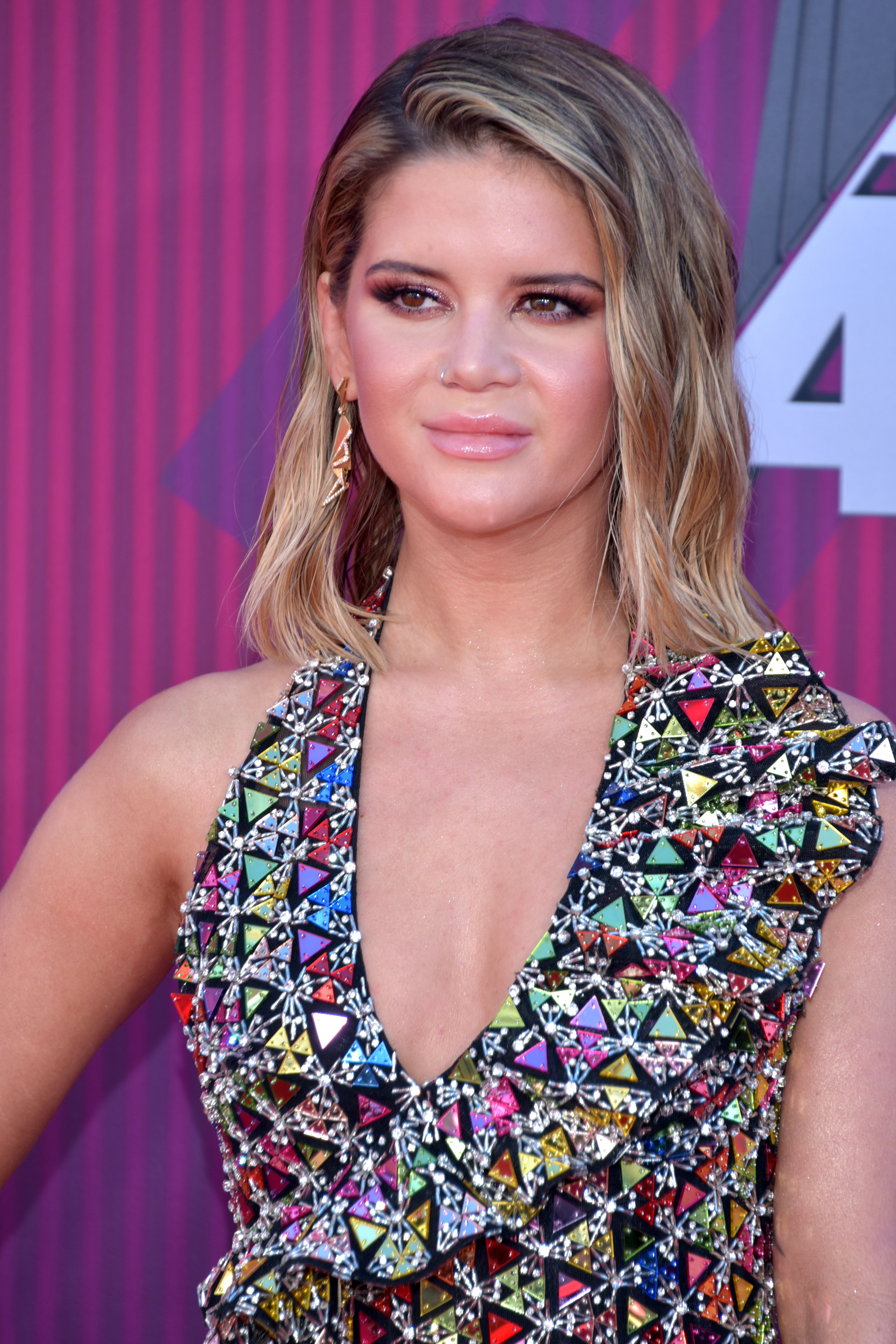
- Morris in 2019
Awards and nominations
| Award | Wins | Nominations |
| Academy of Country Music Awards | 5 | 18 |
| American Music Awards | 1 | 8 |
| Billboard Music Awards | 3 | 9 |
| Country Music Association Awards | 5 | 25 |
| Critics' Choice Awards | 0 | 1 |
| Electronic Dance Music Awards | 0 | 2 |
| Golden Globes Awards | 0 | 1 |
| Grammy Awards | 1 | 17 |
| Hollywood Music In Media Awards | 1 | 1 |
| iHeartRadio Music Awards | 3 | 11 |
| MTV Video Music Awards | 0 | 1 |

Totals (Note: Certain award groups do not simply award one winner. They acknowledge several different recipients, have runners-up, and have third place. Since this is a specific recognition and is different from losing an award, runner-up mentions are considered wins in this award tally. For simplification and to avoid errors, each award in this list has been presumed to have had a prior nomination.)
- Wins: 30+
- Nominations: 90+

American singer–songwriter Maren Morris has won over 30 awards and has been nominated for over 90 awards. She has received five awards from the Academy of Country Music. Her first accolade from the association was for New Female Artist of the Year in 2017. She later won Female Artist of the Year two times in 2020 and 2021. Her single "The Bones" would also win Song of the Year from the association in 2021. Morris has also won five awards from the Country Music Association, beginning with New Artist of the Year in 2016. She later won Female Vocalist of the Year in 2020, while "The Bones" won Single and Song of the Year. Morris's single "My Church" won one accolade from the Grammy Awards and she has since been nominated several more times from the program. Morris also has won and been nominated for awards by Billboard, Country Music Television and the American Music Awards.

== Academy of Country Music Awards ==
The Academy of Country Music Awards (or ACM Awards) is an annual country music awards show, the first ever created, established in 1964 to honor excellence and achievements in country music. Morris has won five awards out of eighteen nominations.

| Year | Category | Nominated work | Result | Ref. |
|---|---|---|---|---|
| 2017 | New Female Vocalist of the Year | Maren Morris | Won | |
| 2017 | Female Vocalist of the Year | Maren Morris | Nominated | |
| 2017 | Album of the Year | Hero | Nominated | |
| 2017 | Single Record of the Year | "My Church" | Nominated | |
| 2018 | Female Vocalist of the Year | Maren Morris | Nominated | |
| 2018 | Vocal Event of the Year | "Craving You" (with Thomas Rhett) | Nominated | |
| 2018 | Vocal Event of the Year | "Dear Hate" (featuring Vince Gill) | Nominated | |
| 2019 | Female Vocalist of the Year | Maren Morris | Nominated | |
| 2020 | Female Artist of the Year | Maren Morris | Won | |
| 2020 | Group of the Year | The Highwomen | Nominated | |
| 2020 | Music Event of the Year | “Fooled Around and Fell in Love” (with Miranda Lambert) | Won | |
| 2020 | Album of the Year | GIRL | Nominated | |
| 2021 | Female Artist of the Year | Maren Morris | Won | |
| 2021 | Group of the Year | The Highwomen | Nominated | |
| 2021 | Single of the Year | "The Bones" | Nominated | |
| 2021 | Song of the Year | "The Bones" | Won | |
| 2021 | Video of the Year | "Better Than We Found It" | Nominated | |
| 2022 | Female Artist of the Year | Maren Morris | Nominated | |

== American Music Awards ==
The American Music Awards is an annual major American music award show by the American Broadcasting Company. Morris has received one award from eight nominations.

| Year | Category | Nominated work | Result | Ref. |
|---|---|---|---|---|
| 2017 | Favorite Female Artist - Country | Maren Morris | Nominated | |
| 2018 | Favorite Female Artist - Country | Maren Morris | Nominated | |
| 2018 | Collaboration of the Year | "The Middle" (with Zedd and Grey) | Nominated | |
| 2019 | Favorite Female Artist - Country | Maren Morris | Nominated | |
| 2020 | Favorite Female Artist - Country | Maren Morris | Won | |
| 2020 | Favorite Song – Country | "The Bones" | Nominated | |
| 2021 | Favorite Female Artist - Country | Maren Morris | Nominated | |
| 2022 | Favorite Female Artist - Country | Maren Morris | Nominated | |

== APRA Music Awards ==
The APRA Music Awards is an annual major Australian ceremony which celebrates excellence in contemporary music, honoring songwriters and publishers who have achieved artistic excellence and outstanding success in their fields. Morris has won twice from three nominations.

| Year | Category | Nominated work | Result | Ref. |
|---|---|---|---|---|
| 2019 | Dance Work of the Year | "The Middle" with (Zedd and Grey) | Won | |
| 2019 | Most Played Australian Work | "The Middle" with (Zedd and Grey) | Won | |
| 2020 | Most Performed Country Work of the Year | "Girl" | Nominated | |

== Astra Awards ==
The Astra Awards, formerly Hollywood Critics Association Awards, is an annual awards ceremony hosted by the Hollywood Creative Alliance, recognize achievements in the entertainment industry. These awards span categories in film, television, and digital media, honoring technical and creative excellence. Morris has been nominated once.

| Year | Category | Nominated work | Result | Ref. |
|---|---|---|---|---|
| 2024 | Best Original Song | "Kiss the Sky" | Nominated | |

== Billboard Music Awards ==
The Billboard Music Awards are honors given out annually by Billboard, a publication covering the music business and a music popularity chart. Morris has won three awards from nine nominations.

| Year | Category | Nominated work | Result | Ref. |
|---|---|---|---|---|
| 2018 | Top Country Female Artist | Maren Morris | Won | |
| 2019 | Top Country Female Artist | Maren Morris | Nominated | |
| 2019 | Top Radio Song | "The Middle" with (Zedd and Grey) | Nominated | |
| 2019 | Top Dance/Electronic Song | "The Middle" with (Zedd and Grey) | Won | |
| 2020 | Top Country Artist | Maren Morris | Nominated | |
| 2020 | Top Female Country Artist | Maren Morris | Won | |
| 2020 | Top Country Album | GIRL | Nominated | |
| 2020 | Top Country Song | "The Bones" | Nominated | |
| 2021 | Top Country Female Artist | Maren Morris | Nominated | |

== Billboard Women in Music ==
The Billboard Women in Music is an annual award ceremony held by Billboard to recognize "women in the music industry who have made significant contributions to the business and who, through their work and continued success, inspire generations of women to take on increasing responsibilities within the field". Morris has been awarded twice, with the Breakthrough Artist Award in 2016, and the Visionary Award in 2024.

| Year | Category | Nominated work | Result | Ref. |
|---|---|---|---|---|
| 2016 | Breakthrough Artist | Herself | Won | |
| 2024 | Visionary Award | Herself | Won | |

== BMI Awards ==
The Broadcast Music, Incorporated (BMI) Awards is an annual award ceremony held annually to honor songwriters. Morris has won a total of eight awards, six from country music, and two from pop music genre fields.

=== BMI Country Awards ===
| Year | Category | Nominated work | Result | Ref. |
|---|---|---|---|---|
| 2017 | Top Country Songs | "My Church" | Won | |
| 2017 | Top Country Songs | "80s Mercedes" | Won | |
| 2018 | Top Country Songs | "I Could Use a Love Song" | Won | |
| 2019 | Top Country Songs | "Rich" | Won | |
| 2020 | Top Country Songs | "Girl" | Won | |
| 2020 | Top Country Songs | "The Bones" | Won | |

=== BMI Pop Awards ===
| Year | Category | Nominated work | Result | Ref. |
|---|---|---|---|---|
| 2021 | Song of the Year | "The Bones" | Won | |
| 2021 | Top Pop Songs | "The Bones" | Won | |

== British Country Music Association Awards ==
The British Country Music Association Awards are held annually to honor national and international success for country music artists familiar to the United Kingdom. Morris has won once out of three nominations.

| Year | Category | Nominated work | Result | Ref. |
|---|---|---|---|---|
| 2016 | International Song of the Year | "My Church" | Nominated | |
| 2019 | International Album of the Year | Girl | Won | |
| 2019 | International Song of the Year | "The Bones" | Nominated | |

== Country Music Association Awards ==
The Country Music Association Awards, also known as CMAs, are presented to country music artists and broadcasters to recognize outstanding achievement in the country music industry. Morris has won five awards out of twenty-five nominations.

| Year | Category | Nominated work | Result | Ref. |
|---|---|---|---|---|
| 2016 | New Artist of the Year | Maren Morris | Won | |
| 2016 | Female Vocalist of the Year | Maren Morris | Nominated | |
| 2016 | Album of the Year | Hero | Nominated | |
| 2016 | Song of the Year | "My Church" | Nominated | |
| 2016 | Single of the Year | "My Church" | Nominated | |
| 2017 | Female Vocalist of the Year | Maren Morris | Nominated | |
| 2017 | Musical Event of the Year | "Craving You" (with Thomas Rhett) | Nominated | |
| 2017 | Music Video of the Year | "Craving You" (with Thomas Rhett) | Nominated | |
| 2018 | Female Vocalist of the Year | Maren Morris | Nominated | |
| 2018 | Musical Event of the Year | "Dear Hate" (featuring Vince Gill) | Nominated | |
| 2019 | Female Vocalist of the Year | Maren Morris | Nominated | |
| 2019 | Album of the Year | Girl | Won | |
| 2019 | Song of the Year | "Girl" | Nominated | |
| 2019 | Single of the Year | "Girl" | Nominated | |
| 2019 | Music Video of the Year | "Girl" | Nominated | |
| 2019 | Musical Event of the Year | "All My Favorite People" (featuring Brothers Osborne) | Nominated | |
| 2020 | Female Vocalist of the Year | Maren Morris | Won | |
| 2020 | Song of the Year | "The Bones" | Won | |
| 2020 | Single of the Year | "The Bones" | Won | |
| 2020 | Musical Event of the Year | "The Bones" (with Hozier) | Nominated | |
| 2020 | Musical Event of the Year | "Fooled Around and Fell in Love" (with Miranda Lambert) | Nominated | |
| 2021 | Female Vocalist of the Year | Maren Morris | Nominated | |
| 2021 | Music Video of the Year | "Chasing After You" (with Ryan Hurd) | Nominated | |
| 2021 | Musical Event of the Year | "Chasing After You" (with Ryan Hurd) | Nominated | |
| 2022 | Album of the Year | Humble Quest | Nominated | |

== CMT Music Awards ==
The CMT Music Awards is an annual ceremony dedicated exclusively to honor country music videos. Morris has received fourteen nominations.

| Year | Category | Nominated work | Result | Ref. |
|---|---|---|---|---|
| 2017 | Female Video of the Year | "80s Mercedes" | Nominated | |
| 2017 | Performance of the Year | "80s Mercedes" (with Alicia Keys on CMT Crossroads) | Nominated | |
| 2018 | Collaborative Video of the Year | “Craving You” (with Thomas Rhett) | Nominated | |
| 2018 | Female Video of the Year | “I Could Use a Love Song” | Nominated | |
| 2019 | Video of the Year | “Girl” | Nominated | |
| 2019 | Female Video of the Year | “Girl” | Nominated | |
| 2019 | Performance of the Year | “(You Make Me Feel Like) A Natural Woman " (with Brandi Carlile) | Nominated | |
| 2020 | Group Video of the Year | "Crowded Table" (as a member of The Highwomen) | Nominated | |
| 2021 | Female Video of the Year | "To Hell & Back" | Nominated | |
| 2021 | Collaborative Video of the Year | "Chasing After You" (with Ryan Hurd) | Nominated | |
| 2021 | Best Family Feature | "Chasing After You" (with Ryan Hurd) | Nominated | |
| 2022 | Video of the Year | "Circles Around This Town" | Nominated | |
| 2022 | Female Video of the Year | "Circles Around This Town" | Nominated | |
| 2023 | Female Video of the Year | "Humble Quest" | Nominated | |

== Critics' Choice Awards ==
The Critics' Choice Awards is an awards show presented annually by the American-Canadian Critics Choice Association (CCA) to honor the finest in cinematic achievement. Morris has received one nomination for her work as a songwriter of "Kiss the Sky" for the movie The Wild Robot.

| Year | Category | Nominated work | Result | Ref. |
|---|---|---|---|---|
| 2025 | Best Song | "Kiss the Sky" for The Wild Robot | Nominated | |

== Electronic Dance Music Awards ==
The Electronic Dance Music Awards (also known as the EDMAs) is an annual music award show focusing on electronic dance music. Morris has received two nominations.

| Year | Category | Nominated work | Result | Ref. |
|---|---|---|---|---|
| 2019 | Best Remix in Trap | "The Middle" (KAYVIAN remix) [with Zedd & Grey] | Nominated | |
| 2019 | Best Mashup | "The Middle" (with Zedd & Grey) vs Calvin Harris' "Feel So Close" (Dramos remix) | Nominated | |

== GLAAD Media Awards ==
The GLAAD Media Award is an annual award ceremony that honors films, television shows, video games, musicians and works of journalism that fairly, accurately and inclusively represent the LGBT community and issues relevant to the community. Morris received the Excellence in Media Award for her advocacy promoting acceptance of the LGBTQ community within the country music genre, since the beginning of her career.

| Year | Category | Nominated work | Result | Ref. |
|---|---|---|---|---|
| 2023 | Excellence in Media | Maren Morris | Won | |

Note: Stephen Daw, journalist of Billboard won Outstanding Print Article for his piece "As Drag Bans Proliferate, Maren Morris Goes Deep With Drag's Biggest Stars on Why the Show Must Go On" at the 35th GLAAD Media Awards.

== Golden Globe Awards ==
The Golden Globe Awards is an annual award ceremony to honor excellence in both international film and television. Morris has received one nomination for her work as a songwriter of "Kiss the Sky" for the movie The Wild Robot.

| Year | Category | Nominated work | Result | Ref. |
|---|---|---|---|---|
| 2025 | Best Original Song | "Kiss the Sky" for The Wild Robot | Nominated | |

== Grammy Awards ==
The Grammy Awards, are awards presented by the Recording Academy of the United States to recognize outstanding achievements in the music industry. They are regarded by many as the most prestigious and significant awards in the music industry worldwide. Morris has won one award from seventeen nominations.

| Year | Category | Nominated work | Result | Ref. |
|---|---|---|---|---|
| 2017 | Best New Artist | Maren Morris | Nominated | |
| 2017 | Best Country Album | Hero | Nominated | |
| 2017 | Best Country Solo Performance | "My Church" | Won | |
| 2017 | Best Country Song | "My Church" | Nominated | |
| 2018 | Best Country Solo Performance | "I Could Use a Love Song" | Nominated | |
| 2019 | Record of the Year | "The Middle" with (Zedd and Grey) | Nominated | |
| 2019 | Best Pop Duo/Group Performance | "The Middle" with (Zedd and Grey) | Nominated | |
| 2019 | Best Country Solo Performance | "Mona Lisas and Mad Hatters" | Nominated | |
| 2019 | Best Country Song | "Dear Hate" (featuring Vince Gill) | Nominated | |
| 2019 | Best Country Duo/Group Performance | "Dear Hate" (featuring Vince Gill) | Nominated | |
| 2020 | Best Country Duo/Group Performance | "Common" (featuring Brandi Carlile) | Nominated | |
| 2021 | Best Country Song | "The Bones" | Nominated | |
| 2022 | Best Country Duo/Group Performance | "Chasing After You" (with Ryan Hurd) | Nominated | |
| 2022 | Best Country Song | "Better Than We Found It" | Nominated | |
| 2023 | Best Country Album | Humble Quest | Nominated | |
| 2023 | Best Country Song | "Circles Around This Town" | Nominated | |
| 2023 | Best Country Solo Performance | "Circles Around This Town" | Nominated | |

== Hollywood Music In Media Awards ==
The Hollywood Music in Media Awards (HMMA) is an award organization honoring original music (Song and Score) in all forms visual media including film, TV, video games, trailers, commercial advertisements, documentaries, music videos and special programs. Morris has been awarded once.

| Year | Category | Nominated work | Result | Ref. |
|---|---|---|---|---|
| 2024 | Best Original Song - Animated Film | "Kiss the Sky" for The Wild Robot | Won | |

== iHeartRadio Music Awards ==
The iHeartRadio Music Awards is a music awards show that celebrates music heard throughout the year across iHeartMedia radio stations nationwide and on iHeartRadio, iHeartMedia's digital music platform. Morris has won three times out of eleven nominations.

| Year | Category | Nominated work | Result | Ref. |
|---|---|---|---|---|
| 2017 | Best New Country Artist | Maren Morris | Nominated | |
| 2019 | Song of the Year | "The Middle" (with Zedd and Grey) | Won | |
| 2019 | Best Collaboration | "The Middle" (with Zedd and Grey) | Nominated | |
| 2019 | Dance Song of the Year | "The Middle" (with Zedd and Grey) | Won | |
| 2019 | Country Song of the Year | "Rich" | Nominated | |
| 2020 | Best Lyrics | "The Bones" | Nominated | |
| 2020 | Best Remix | "The Bones" (with Hozier) | Nominated | |
| 2020 | Best Cover Song | "Fooled Around and Fell in Love" | Nominated | |
| 2020 | Country Song of the Year | "Girl" | Nominated | |
| 2021 | Country Artist of the Year | Maren Morris | Nominated | |
| 2021 | Country Song of the Year | "The Bones" | Won | |

== iHeartRadio Titanium Awards ==
The iHeartRadio Titanium Awards are awarded to an artist when their song reaches 1 Billion Spins across iHeartRadio Stations. Morris has been awarded twice.

| Year | Nominated work | Category | Result | Ref. |
|---|---|---|---|---|
| 2018 | "The Middle" (with Zedd & Grey) | 1 Billion Total Audience Spins on iHeartRadio Stations | Won | |
| 2020 | "The Bones" | 1 Billion Total Audience Spins on iHeartRadio Stations | Won | |

== iHeartRadio Much Music Video Awards ==
The iHeart Radio Much Music Video Awards (also known as iHeart Radio MMVAs) were an annual awards show that honoured the year's best music videos. Morris received two nominations.

| Year | Category | Nominated work | Result | Ref. |
|---|---|---|---|---|
| 2018 | Best Collaboration | "The Middle" (with Zedd and Grey) | Nominated | |
| 2018 | Song of the Summer | "The Middle" (with Zedd and Grey) | Nominated | |

== Iowa Film Critics Association Awards ==
The Iowa Film Critics Association Awards (IFCA) recognize the best films of the year. Morris has been awarded once.

| Year | Category | Nominated work | Result | Ref. |
|---|---|---|---|---|
| 2024 | Best Original Song | "Kiss the Sky" from The Wild Robot | Won | |

== Kids' Choice Awards ==
The Kids Choice Awards is an American annual award ceremony show produced by Nickelodeon. Morris has received one nomination.

| Year | Category | Nominated work | Result | Ref. |
|---|---|---|---|---|
| 2025 | Favorite Song from a Movie | "Kiss the Sky" from The Wild Robot | Nominated | |

== MTV Video Music Awards ==
The MTV Video Music Awards (also known as VMAs) are an annual fan-voted award show started in 1984. Morris has received one nomination.

| Year | Category | Nominated work | Result | Ref. |
|---|---|---|---|---|
| 2019 | Best Power Anthem | "Girl" | Nominated | |

== Music City Film Critics Association Awards ==
The Music City Film Critics Association Awards (MCFCA) recognize the best films of the year. Morris has been awarded once.

| Year | Category | Nominated work | Result | Ref. |
|---|---|---|---|---|
| 2025 | Best Original Song | "Kiss the Sky" from The Wild Robot | Won | |

== New Mexico Film Critics Awards ==
The New Mexico Film Critics Association Awards honors the best in film since 2016. Morris has been awarded once.

| Year | Category | Nominated work | Result | Ref. |
|---|---|---|---|---|
| 2024 | Best Original Song | "Kiss the Sky" from The Wild Robot | Won | |

== New Music Awards ==
The New Music Awards are honors given annually in music to both recording artists and radio stations by New Music Weekly magazine, a publication encompassing music charts within the music industry. Morris has received one nomination.

| Year | Category | Nominated work | Result | Ref. |
|---|---|---|---|---|
| 2024 | Country Female Artist of the Year | Maren Morris | Nominated | |

== North Carolina Film Critics Association Awards ==
The North Carolina Film Critics Association Awards (NCFCA) represents the best in film of the year. Morris has received one nomination.

| Year | Category | Nominated work | Result | Ref. |
|---|---|---|---|---|
| 2025 | Best Original Song | "Kiss the Sky" from The Wild Robot | Nominated | |

== People's Choice Awards ==
The People's Choice Awards is an American awards show recognizing the people and the work of popular culture. Morris has received one nomination.

| Year | Category | Nominated work | Result | Ref. |
|---|---|---|---|---|
| 2019 | Country Artist of 2019 | Maren Morris | Nominated | |

== Radio Disney Music Awards ==
The Radio Disney Music Awards honor the most popular and played artists for the previous years. Morris has won one award from six nominations.

| Year | Category | Nominated work | Result | Ref. |
|---|---|---|---|---|
| 2017 | Best New Country Artist | Maren Morris | Won | |
| 2017 | Favorite Country Song | "80s Mercedes" | Nominated | |
| 2018 | Song of the Year | "The Middle" (with Zedd and Grey) | Nominated | |
| 2018 | Best Dance Track | "The Middle" (with Zedd and Grey) | Nominated | |
| 2018 | Best Collaboration | "The Middle" (with Zedd and Grey) | Nominated | |
| 2018 | Country Favorite Artist | Maren Morris | Nominated | |

== Satellite Awards ==
The Satellite Awards are annual awards given by the International Press Academy that are commonly noted in entertainment industry journals and blogs. Morris has received one nomination.

| Year | Category | Nominated work | Result | Ref. |
|---|---|---|---|---|
| 2025 | Best Original Song | "Kiss the Sky" from The Wild Robot | Nominated | |

== Teen Choice Awards ==
The Teen Choice Awards is an annual show that honors the years biggest achievements in music, movies, sports, television, fashion and more. Morris has received five nominations.

| Year | Category | Nominated work | Result | Ref. |
|---|---|---|---|---|
| 2017 | Choice Country Song | "Craving You" (with Thomas Rhett) | Nominated | |
| 2018 | Choice Music: Country Artist | Maren Morris | Nominated | |
| 2018 | Choice Music: Collaboration | "The Middle" (with Zedd and Grey) | Nominated | |
| 2018 | Choice Music: Electronic/Dance Song | "The Middle" (with Zedd and Grey) | Nominated | |
| 2019 | Choice Country Song | "Girl" | Nominated | |

== Texas Music Project ==
The Texas Music Project is a nonprofit organization which provides access to music education programs for young people across the Lone Star State. Morris was named Honorary Chairman of Texas Music Project in 2018.

| Year | Category | Nominated work | Result | Ref. |
|---|---|---|---|---|
| 2018 | Chairman of Texas Music Project | Maren Morris | Honored | |

== Las Vegas Film Critics Society Awards ==
The Las Vegas Film Critics Society (LVFCS) is a film festival which rewards the best in film of the year. Morris has received one nomination.

| Year | Category | Nominated work | Result | Ref. |
|---|---|---|---|---|
| 2024 | Best Song | "Kiss the Sky" from The Wild Robot | Nominated | |

== Variety Hitmakers Awards ==
The Variety Hitmakers Awards is an annual award ceremony presented by Variety, which recognize "the artists, labels, executives, producers, publishers, sound mixers, engineers, managers and marketing mavens behind the year’s most consumed songs." Morris has been awarded twice by the magazine.

| Year | Category | Nominated work | Result | Ref. |
|---|---|---|---|---|
| 2020 | Crossover Artist Award | Maren Morris | Won | |
| 2023 | Changemaker of the Year Award | Maren Morris | Won | |

== Other accolades ==
=== Listicles ===
Name of publisher, name of listicle, placement result, and year (s) listed
| Publisher | Listicle | Year | Result | Ref. |
|---|---|---|---|---|
| AllMusic | The 200 Best Albums of the 2010s | 2020 | Listed (Hero) | |
| American Songwriter | The Top 24 Albums of 2022 | 2022 | Listed (Humble Quest) | |
| Albumism | The 100 Best Albums of 2022 | 2022 | 16th (Humble Quest) | |
| Billboard | The Top 50 Albums of 2016 | 2016 | 9th (Hero) | |
| Billboard | Songs of the Summer | 2018 | 5th ("The Middle") | |
| Billboard | Top Country Artists of the 2010s | 2019 | 47th | |
| Billboard | The 50 Best Albums of 2019 | 2019 | 26th (Girl) | |
| Billboard | The 100 Greatest Albums of the 2010s | 2019 | 64th (Hero) | |
| Billboard | Songs of the Summer | 2020 | 13th ("The Bones") | |
| Billboard | Top Country Songwriters | 2020 | 3rd | |
| Billboard | The 100 Greatest Country Artists of All Time | 2024 | 99th | |
| Billboard | Top Hot Dance/Electronic Songs of 2024 | 2024 | 91st ("42") | |
| Billboard | Top Hot Country Songs of the 21st Century | 2025 | 10th ("The Bones") | |
| Billboard | Top Country Albums of the 21st Century | 2025 | 89th (Girl) | |
| Billboard | Top Country Artists of the 21st Century | 2025 | 58th | |
| Cowboys and Indians | Best Female Country Singers | 2023 | Listed | |
| Entertainment Weekly | The Best Country Albums of 2016 | 2016 | 5th (Hero) | |
| Esquire | The 25 Best Albums of 2022 | 2022 | Listed (Humble Quest) | |
| Forbes | 30 Under 30 | 2018 | Listed | |
| Guinness World Records | Most first-day and first-week streams for a Country Album by a Female Artist on Amazon | 2022 | 1st (Humble Quest) | |
| Guinness World Records | Most streams for a Country Song debut by a Female Artist on Amazon | 2022 | 1st ("Circles Around This Town") | |
| Good Morning America | The 50 Best Albums of 2022 | 2022 | 48th (Humble Quest) | |
| Holler | The 50 Most Influential Women in Country Music | 2024 | 40th | |
| Out100 | Most Impactful and Influential LGBTQ+ People of 2024 | 2024 | Listed | |
| Rolling Stone | The 40 Best Country Albums of 2016 | 2016 | 1st (Hero) | |
| Rolling Stone | The 50 Best Albums of 2016 | 2016 | 13th (Hero) | |
| Rolling Stone | 20 Years of Country Hits by Women | 2019 | Listed ("Girl") | |
| Rolling Stone | The 250 Greatest Albums of the 21st Century | 2025 | 207th (Hero) | |
| USA Today | The Best Country Music Duets of All Time | 2024 | Listed (with Vince Gill) | |
| Variety | The 10 Best Albums of 2016 | 2016 | 7th (Hero) | |
| Wide Open Country | The 25 Best Country Songs of 2017 | 2017 | Listed ("Dear Hate") | |
| Wide Open Country | 5 Country Stars That Were Wickedly Talented Teens | 2017 | Listed | |
| Wide Open Country | 10 Rare Country Music CDs That are Worth Good Money | 2017 | Listed (Walk On) | |
| Wide Open Country | 10 Country Stars Who Have No Time for Internet Trolls | 2017 | Listed | |
| Wide Open Country | 10 of the Best Country Music Videos of 2017 (So Far) | 2017 | 1st ("Craving You") | |
| Wide Open Country | 10 of the Best Country Music Videos of 2017 (So Far) | 2017 | 8th ("I Could Use a Love Song") | |
| Wide Open Country | The Best Songs of 2018 (So Far) | 2018 | Listed ("The Middle") | |
| Wide Open Country | The 25 Best Country Songs About the Moon | 2018 | Listed ("I'll Be the Moon") | |
| Wide Open Country | The 20 Best Country Albums of 2019 | 2019 | Listed (Girl) | |
| Wide Open Country | The 20 Country Songs All Pop Lovers Should Listen To | 2021 | Listed ("The Middle") | |
| Wide Open Country | The 20 Country Songs All Pop Lovers Should Listen To | 2021 | Listed ("The Bones") | |
| Wide Open Country | 15 Country and Americana Songs About Female Empowerment | 2022 | Listed ("Girl") | |
| Wide Open Country | 12 Country Stars You Should Definitely Follow on TikTok | 2022 | Listed | |
| Wide Open Country | 20 Country Stars Who Are Outspoken LGBTQ+ Allies | 2022 | Listed | |
| Wide Open Country | The 25 Best Country Songs of 2022 | 2022 | 1st ("Circles Around This Town") | |
| Wide Open Country | 12 Country Road Trip Songs For Long Summer Drives | 2023 | 4th ("80s Mercedes") | |
| Wide Open Country | The 50 Best Country Love Songs of All Time | 2024 | 28th ("The Bones") | |
