= Alon Isocianu =

- Born: Alon Isocianu; Hadera, Israel
- Occupation: Music video director
- Years active: 2008 - present

Alon Isocianu (born in Hadera, Israel) is a Canadian music video and commercial director and visual artist. He has helmed music videos for a variety of notable international artists including Kelly Clarkson, Maren Morris, Pentatonix, Lights, Billy Talent, Finger Eleven and Shawn Hook. Alon is most known for his very stylized, VFX & Design heavy videos. As a designer and creative director he has been responsible for the opening title sequences of Netflix's Tokyo Trial (miniseries) and BET's In Contempt.

He is represented by Reprobates for music videos in the US. In Canada, he is represented by reactiv, a creative studio which he also co-owns.

== Select videography ==
- 2020 - Pentatonix - "Happy Now"
- 2020 - Good Kid - "Down With The King"
- 2017 - Shawn Hook "Never Let Me Let You Go"
- 2017 - Superfruit - "GUY.EXE"
- 2017 - Superfruit - "Future Friends"
- 2017 - Superfruit - "Imaginary Parties"
- 2017 - Maren Morris - "I Could Use a Love Song"
- 2017 - Serena Ryder - "Electric Love"
- 2016 - Ria Mae - "Ooh Love"
- 2016 - Maren Morris - "80s Mercedes"
- 2016 - Billy Talent - "Afraid of Heights"
- 2016 - Ria Mae - "Gold"
- 2016 - Shawn Hook - "Relapse"
- 2015 - Kelly Clarkson - "Piece by Piece"
- 2015 - Pentatonix - "Can't Sleep Love"
- 2015 - Kelly Clarkson - "Invincible"
- 2015 - Finger Eleven - "Wolves And Doors"
- 2015 - Shawn Hook "Sound Of Your Heart"
- 2014 - Lights "Up We Go"
- 2014 - Meaghan Smith - "Have A Heart"
- 2014 - The Angry Kids feat. Belle Humble - "Battle (It's Beautiful)"
- 2014 - Andee - "Never Gone"
- 2013 - Billy Talent - "Show Me The Way"
- 2013 - Billy Talent - "Runnin' Across The Tracks"
- 2013 - Heaven's Basement - "Lights Out In London"
- 2013 - Thousand Foot Krutch - "War Of Change"
- 2013 - Skillet - "American Noise"
- 2013 - Skillet - "Sick Of It"
- 2012 - Victoria Duffield - "Break My Heart"
- 2012 - Victoria Duffield - "Feel"
- 2012 - Heaven's Basement - "Nothing Left To Lose"
- 2012 - Kerli - "Zero Gravity"
- 2012 - Cory Lee - "Bounce On It"
- 2011 - Finger Eleven - "Whatever Doesn't Kill Me"
- 2011 - Victoria Duffield - "Shut Up and Dance"
- 2011 - Candy Coated Killahz - "Neon Black"
- 2011 - The Balconies - "Kill Count"
- 2010 - HotKid - "Yours and Mine"
- 2008 - Ubiquitous Synergy Seeker - "Hollowpoint Sniper Hyperbole"

== Awards and nominations ==
- 2018 Nominated - CMT Awards "Female Video Of The Year" (for Maren Morris - "I Could Use A Love Song")
- 2016 Nominated - iHeartRadio Much MMVA "Pop Video Of The Year" (for Shawn Hook - "Relapse")
- 2015 Winner - East Coast Music Award for "Best Video" (for Meaghan Smith "Have A Heart")
- 2015 Nominee - Berlin Music Video Award for "Best Visual Effects" (for The Angry Kids "Battle")
- 2012 Nominated - MuchMusic MMVA "Pop Video Of The Year" (for Victoria Duffield - "Shut Up & Dance")
- 2011 Nominated - MuchMusic MMVA "Post Production Of The Year" (for Candy Coated Killahz - "Neon Black")
- 2008 Winner - Cravefest Music Video "Best Music Video" (electronic/dance/world unsigned category for Hexes & Oh's video "H-H-Highschool").
- 2008 Winner - Cravefest Music Video for "Best Direction/Production" (for Hexes & Oh's video - "H-H-Highschool")
- 2007 Winner - Cravefest Music Video Award for "Best Production" (for The Sweet Homewreckers' "Wild America")
- 2007 Winner - Cravefest Music Video Award for "Best Video" music video (for The Sweet Homewreckers' "Wild America")
- 2007 Winner - CHUM/CityTV Award (For video body of work, including "Catherine Deneuve" video for Kelly & The Kellygirls)
