= Maren Morris (EP) =

EP by Maren Morris
- Released: August 2015
- Length: 17:59
- Label: Columbia Nashville
- Producer: Maren Morris; Busbee; Brad Hill

Maren Morris chronology
Maren Morris (2015)	Hero (2016)

Maren Morris is the debut extended play (EP) by American singer Maren Morris. It was self-released in August 2015, and later released through Columbia Nashville on November 6. The EP marked Morris's major-label debut, incorporating influences from country, pop, rock, and hip-hop. Following Maren Morris's initial self-release, it attracted significant attention on Spotify, leading Morris to sign with Columbia Nashville and helping launch her mainstream breakthrough with the single "My Church".

== Background ==
Before releasing her major-label debut EP, Morris had begun performing professionally at age 14, independently released three studio albums, and established herself as a songwriter for artists including Tim McGraw and Kelly Clarkson. She was also writing alongside musicians including Kacey Musgraves and Brothers Osborne.

== Composition ==
Discussing the project, Morris said she "never really set out to make a country record or a pop record", explaining instead that she simply "wanted to make it [hers]". The EP combines elements of rock, pop, hip-hop, and country.

== Release ==
In August 2015, Morris self-released five songs as a self-titled EP on Spotify. The EP garnered 2.5 million streams on the platform in a month, and its three songs appeared on the Spotify's US and Global "Viral 50" chart. It led Morris sign to Columbia Nashville in September that year, and they re-released the EP on November 6. The track "My Church" gained more than one million streams on Spotify.

== Critical reception ==
Professional ratings
Review scores
Source	Rating
AllMusic	3.5/5 stars

Mark Deming of AllMusic felt that Morris adopted various genres in Maren Morris such as pop, country, hip-hop, and rock, which "reflects her bold and confident personality".

== Track listing ==
All tracks were produced by Morris and Busbee, except where noted.

Maren Morris track listing
No.	Title	Writer(s)	Producer(s)	Length
1.	"My Church"	Maren Morris; Busbee		3:17
2.	"80s Mercedes"	Morris; Busbee		3:31
3.	"Drunk Girls Don't Cry"	Morris; Barry Dean; Luke Laird	Morris; Busbee; Brad Hill	3:32
4.	"I Wish I Was"	Morris; Hemby; Ryan Hurd	Morris; Hill	4:00
5.	"Company You Keep"	Morris; Laird; Shane McAnally	Morris; Busbee; Hill	3:37
Total length:				17:59

== Charts ==
Chart performance
Chart (2015)	Peak position
US Billboard 200	96
US Top Country Albums (Billboard)	22
US Heatseekers Albums (Billboard)	1
