= Circles Around This Town =

Single by Maren Morris

from the album Humble Quest
- Released: January 7, 2022
- Genre: Country
- Length: 3:15
- Label: Columbia Nashville
- Songwriters: Ryan Hurd; Julia Michaels; Maren Morris; Jimmy Robbins
- Producer: Greg Kurstin

Maren Morris singles chronology
"Bigger Man" (2021)	"Circles Around This Town" (2022)	"Make You Say" (2022)

Music video
- "Circles Arouns This Town" on YouTube

"Circles Around This Town" is a song by American singer Maren Morris. It was written by Morris, along with her then–husband Ryan Hurd, Julia Michaels, and Jimmy Robbins. It was released on January 7, 2022, as the lead single from Morris's third studio album Humble Quest. The song received positive reviews from critics, earning two nominations at the 65th Annual Grammy Awards for Best Country Song and Best Country Solo Performance.

== Background and writing ==
Maren Morris had first reached her commercial breakthrough in 2016 with the single "My Church". The song helped her attain a recording contract and a major label album that spawned further country hits. She followed it with several more commercially-successful singles, along with major industry awards. Morris wrote "Circles Around This Town" in preparation for her next studio album. It was composed with Ryan Hurd and Julia Michaels during the fall 2020 during a "deeply uninspired" period, according to Morris. It was among her first times co-writing in person since the start of the COVID-19 pandemic. According to Morris, she had struggled writing material virtually due to the lack of places being open.

The song's concept is based on Morris's journey to country success, describing her path of moving to Nashville, Tennessee and signing a recording contract. "I hope that when listeners hear it, they can hear a bit of themselves in that story, even though it is mine," she told CMT. The track was recorded with producer Greg Kurstin. "I needed to make this record to pull me out of the weird boredom, depression that I think every human being on this planet has had during the last couple of years," she explained of its recording process.

== Critical reception ==
"Circles Around This Town" has received positive reviews from critics. Jon Freeman of Rolling Stone praised its production: "'Circles Around This Town' moves along with the kind of ambling groove that’s been a big part of Morris' sound—unhurried and bolstered by a grunge-lite guitar riff." Billy Dukes highlighted the album's writing in his review: "Much like she did with her debut single, Morris takes us back to the front seat of her car for creative inspiration. It's as relatable now as it was five years ago."

Jessica Nicholson by Billboard wrote that "the song embodies a crunchier, more rootsy vibe than other recent fare" finding similarities with "My Church" and "80s Mercedes". Pitchfork's Sam Sodomsky also finds Morris's search for earliest sonorities in the song, pointing out that "Morris moved away from the glossier style, [...] taking influence from singer-songwriters like Patty Griffin and Carole King".

== Music video ==
The music video for "Circles Around This Town" was directed by Harper Smith. It drew inspiration from the videos of 1990s music artists. According to Morris, she appreciated the aesthetic of the decade's videos. "I've always been so inspired by the industrial, blown out colors of music videos from the '90s, so [director] Harper Smith and I wanted the aesthetics of this video to reflect that grainy, devil-may-care attitude of all my females heroes from that era: Sheryl, Fiona, Alanis." The video features an appearance from Reba McEntire who can be heard in a television advertisement. The video premiered the same day of the single's release.

== Release and chart performance ==
"Circles Around This Town" was released as a single on January 7, 2022, via Columbia Nashville. Following its release the song was the most added single to country music radio in the first month of 2022. It also broke Amazon's record for "most streams for a country song debut by a female artist", according to Music Row magazine. It also debuted at the number one spot on Pandora's country chart. It debuted in the top 30 of Billboard's Country Airplay chart in January 2022. As of August 2026, it is her last top ten country hit.

== Personnel ==
- Maren Morris – vocals, composer, lyricist
- Julia Michaels – background vocals, composer, lyricist
- Jimmy Robbins – composer, lyricist, overdub engineer
- Ryan Hurd – background vocals, composer, lyricist
- Greg Kurstin – producer, acoustic guitar, bass, drums, electric guitar, percussion, recording engineer
- Bennett Lewis – mandolin
- Rich Hinman – steel guitar
- Randy Merrill – mastering engineer
- Serban Ghenea – mixing engineer
- Julian Burg – recording engineer
- Bryce Bordone – assistant engineer
- Matt Tuggle – assistant engineer

== Accolades ==
Year	Ceremony	Award	Result	Ref.
2022	CMT Music Awards	Female Video of the Year	Nominated	
2023	Grammy Awards	Best Country Song	Nominated	
2023	Grammy Awards	Best Country Solo Performance	Nominated	

== Charts ==
=== Weekly charts ===
Weekly chart performance for "Circles Around This Town"
Chart (2022)	Peak position
Canada Hot 100 (Billboard)	71
Canada Country (Billboard)	7
New Zealand Hot Singles (RMNZ)	30
US Billboard Hot 100	52
US Country Airplay (Billboard)	9
US Hot Country Songs (Billboard)	9

=== Year-end charts ===
2022 year-end chart performance for "Circles Around This Town"
Chart (2022)	Position
US Billboard Hot 100	100
US Country Airplay (Billboard)	31
US Hot Country Songs (Billboard)	25

== Certifications ==
Certifications for "Circles Around This Town"
Region	Certification	Certified units/sales
Canada (Music Canada)	Gold	40,000^{‡}
United States (RIAA)	Gold	500,000^{‡}
^{‡} Sales+streaming figures based on certification alone.

== Release history ==
Release history for "Circles Around This Town"
Region	Date	Format	Label	Ref.
Various	January 7, 2022	Digital download; streaming	Columbia Nashville	
United States	January 10, 2022	Country radio	Columbia Nashville	
