= Nervous =

Nervous may refer to:

- Nervousness
- Nervous system, a network of cells in an animal's body that coordinates movement and the senses
  - Nervous tissue, the cells of the nervous system that work in aggregate to transmit signals

== Music ==
- "Nervous" (Gene Summers song), 1958; covered by several performers
- "Nervous" (Gavin James song), 2016
- "Nervous" (Shawn Mendes song), 2018
- "Nervous" (Maren Morris song), 2022
- "Nervous", a song by Blackbear from Help, 2015
- "Nervous", a song by K.Flay from Solutions, 2019
- "Nervous", a song by L Devine, 2018
- "Nervous", a song by Nick Jonas from Spaceman, 2021
- "Nervous", a song by the Drums from Brutalism, 2019
- "Nervous", a song by X Ambassadors from VHS, 2015
- Nervous Records, a UK record label
- Nervous Records (US), a US record label

== See also ==
- "Nervousness", a song by the Gigolo Aunts from Tales from the Vinegar Side
- Nervous Norvus (1912–1968), the performing name of Jimmy Drake
- Nervous shark, a species of requiem shark
