= Background Music =

Background music is a mode of musical performance chosen to affect behavioral and emotional responses.

Background Music may refer to:

- Background Music (album), the 2001 debut album by the band Give Up the Ghost
- "Background Music" (song), by Maren Morris from her 2022 album Humble Quest
- "Background Music", a song by Thomas Rhett from his 2015 album Tangled Up
- Background Score, in film or television
