= I Can't Love You Anymore =

I Can't Love You Anymore may refer to:

- "I Can't Love You Anymore" (Maren Morris song), a 2022 song by Maren Morris
- "I Can't Love You Anymore" (Ella Langley and Morgan Wallen song), a 2026 song by Ella Langley and Morgan Wallen
