= Make You Say =

Single by Zedd, Maren Morris and Beauz
- Released: 19 August 2022
- Recorded: 2018
- Genre: Electropop; dance-pop
- Length: 3:26
- Label: Interscope
- Songwriters: Anton Zaslavski; Bernie Yang; Charlie Puth; Jacob Kasher Hindlin; Johan Yang; Maren Morris
- Producers: Beauz; Zedd

Zedd singles chronology
"Follow" (2022)	"Make You Say" (2022)	"Out of Time" (2024)

Maren Morris singles chronology
"Circles Around This Town" (2022)	"Make You Say" (2022)	"I Can't Love You Anymore" (2022)

Music video
- "Make You Say" on YouTube

"Make You Say" is a song by German record producer singer Zedd, American singer Maren Morris, and American group Beauz. It was released as a single on 19 August 2022, through Interscope Records. The song marked the trio's first collaboration and reunited Zedd and Morris following their 2018 single "The Middle". Developed over several years, it is rooted in electropop and dance-pop productions, and was promoted through a music video produced as part of Apple's "Made on iPad" campaign. The song charted at number 20 on the US Bubbling Under Hot 100 chart.

== Background and development ==
Originally conceived as an instrumental, "Make You Say" began taking shape in 2018 while Zedd was working with the American production duo Beauz. Although several toplines were attempted, he felt they did not fit the track and chose to wait until he found the right collaborator. Zedd later co-wrote the topline with Charlie Puth, but as he was never intended to perform it, Zedd approached Morris because of their previous collaboration on "The Middle", calling her voice "phenomenal". After she recorded a demo, Zedd traveled to Nashville to record the final vocals with her in the same studio where they had recorded "The Middle". Morris described the experience as "major déjà vu" and "a little spooky" since it reunited the pair with the same studio and production team four years later.

According to Zedd, recording "Make You Say" was easier than "The Middle" as they had already established a creative partnership. Morris described the sessions as "more of a collaboration", having rewritten parts of the lyrics from her own perspective and helped write the bridge and ending. Zedd credited her contributions with giving the song "a whole new level" and convincing him to keep its final section. Morris also described the song as having "such a vibey melody" and said filming the music video was "a first for [her]" due to its choreography and animation.

== Composition ==
"Make You Say" is an electropop and dance-pop song featuring buoyant production. Its lyrics depict the narrator telling a former partner how much they will miss her after the relationship ends. Comparing the song to "The Middle", Morris described "Make You Say" as "more of a dancy, blissed-out bop", adding that she did not want to approach the collaboration by asking, "How do we outdo ourselves?". Agreeing on this, Zedd stated that he originally aimed to retain the song's broad pop appeal.

Writing for Vulture, Justin Curto described "Make You Say" as a "bubbly love song", praising Morris's "soulful vocals" and its "playful drop" as well suited to the end of summer.

== Promotion and release ==
Ahead of its release, Zedd and Morris teased "Make You Say" on social media. On 13 August 2022, he posted a photograph of the pair with the caption, "Should we do it again?", to which she replied, "Round 2?". Morris later shared a 14-second preview of the song on TikTok. On 15 August, they announced the single and revealed its cover artwork, confirming that it would be released on 19 August. Beauz also shared the announcement on social media. On 26 October, Zedd and Morris performed "Make You Say" on The Tonight Show Starring Jimmy Fallon.

== Music video ==
Depicting the same break-up through three different scenarios, the accompanying music video was produced as part of Apple's "Made on iPad" campaign using the animation app FlipaClip. During filming, Zedd continued revising the song, prompting minor reshoots after changing parts of the arrangement, while Morris learned choreography for the production.

Throughout the video, animated elements—including tears, waves, flames, and Morris's silhouette—interact with the live-action footage to reflect the emotions of a break-up. By the conclusion, the visuals transition entirely into animation, depicting Morris dancing through a psychedelic landscape as she comes to accept the end of the relationship.

== Critical reception ==
In a mixed review, Pitchfork's Shaad D'Souza unfavorably compared "Make You Say" with "The Middle". He argued that the song replaces the earlier track's distinctive production with more conventional EDM elements and wrote that Morris's vocal performance loses the "grit" that characterised her earlier work, concluding that "Make You Say" was "middling".

== Personnel ==
Credits were adapted from Tidal.

- Maren Morris – lead vocals, background vocals, songwriter
- Zedd – producer, vocal producer, mixing engineer, programmer, songwriter
- Bernie Yang – producer, programmer, songwriter
- Johan Yang – producer, programmer, songwriter
- Charlie Puth – songwriter
- Jacob Kasher Hindlin – songwriter
- Dave Rene – A&R
- Ryan Shanahan – engineer, mixing engineer
- Mike Marsh – mastering engineer

== Charts ==
Weekly chart performance
Chart (2022)	Peak position
New Zealand Hot Singles (RMNZ)	25
US Bubbling Under Hot 100 (Billboard)	20
