= I Can't Love You Anymore (Maren Morris song) =

Single by Maren Morris

from the album Humble Quest
- Written: January 2021
- Released: September 26, 2022
- Length: 2:50
- Label: Sony
- Songwriters: Greg Kurstin; Maren Morris; Ryan Hurd
- Producer: Greg Kurstin

Maren Morris singles chronology
"Make You Say" (2022)	"I Can't Love You Anymore" (2022)	"Texas" (2023)

Music video
- "I Can't Love You Anymore" on YouTube

"I Can't Love You Anymore" is a song by American singer Maren Morris. Following its initial release as a promotional single from her third studio album, Humble Quest (2022), on September 13, 2022, it was later serviced to US country radio as the album's second single on September 26. The song was written by Morris with her then-husband Ryan Hurd and Greg Kurstin, and was inspired by a minor argument between the couple before a songwriting session. Melinda Newman of Billboard magazine gave a positive review, with praise directed toward its country sound and affectionate portrayal of married life.

== Background and release ==
Morris wrote "I Can't Love You Anymore" with her husband Ryan Hurd and Greg Kurstin during a songwriting session at Kurstin's home in Hawaii in January 2021. According to her, she and Hurd had been "bickering about something" earlier that morning before Hurd suggested the title, "I can't love you any more than I do now", which she said "lightened the mood". Morris described the songwriting session as "couples therapy" for the pair.

Serving as a promotional single from Morris's third studio album, Humble Quest (2022), "I Can't Love You Anymore" was released on September 13, 2022. It was serviced to US country radio on September 26 that year, becoming the album's second single.

== Composition ==
"I Can't Love You Anymore" was written by Morris, Hurd, and Greg Kurstin, with production by Kurstin. Morris performs the lead vocals, while Hurd provides background vocals. Kurstin also plays acoustic guitar, bass, drums, electric guitar, percussion, and piano, in addition to serving as a recording engineer. Bennett Lewis contributed dobro, and Rich Hinman played steel guitar. The song was mixed by Serban Ghenea, mastered by Randy Merrill, and recorded by Kurstin and Julian Burg, with Bryce Bordone and Matt Tuggle serving as assistant engineers.

"I Can't Love You Anymore" is built around a repetitive chorus repeating its title phrase, contrasted with verses featuring more vivid imagery and wordplay. Addressed to Hurd, the lyrics reference their relationship while reflecting on arguments, compromise, and lasting commitment. Morris said she deliberately kept the chorus simple while making the verses "really get colorful with the language" and "a little more edgy". She later revised part of the chorus to reduce its repetition before recording the final vocal.

== Promotion ==
On April 11, 2022, Morris and Hurd performed "I Can't Love You Anymore" at the 2022 CMT Music Awards. She also performed the song at Austin City Limits on February 11, 2023, which was premiered exclusively by People magazine.

== Critical reception ==
Reviewing Humble Quest for Billboard, Melinda Newman described "I Can't Love You Anymore" as a "testament to enduring love". She also identified it as "the most twangy song on the album", highlighting its acoustic guitar arrangement and playful lyrics addressed to Morris's husband.

== Personnel ==
Credits were adapted from Tidal.

- Maren Morris – lead vocals, songwriter
- Ryan Hurd – background vocals, songwriter
- Greg Kurstin – producer, acoustic guitar, bass, drums, electric guitar, percussion, piano, recording engineer, songwriter
- Bennett Lewis – dobro
- Rich Hinman – steel guitar
- Serban Ghenea – mixing engineer
- Randy Merrill – mastering engineer
- Julian Burg – recording engineer
- Bryce Bordone – assistant engineer
- Matt Tuggle – assistant engineer

== Charts ==
Weekly chart performance
Chart (2022–2023)	Peak position
US Country Airplay (Billboard)	53
