= Background Music (song) =

Promotional single by Maren Morris

from the album Humble Quest
- Released: February 11, 2022
- Length: 3:35
- Label: Sony
- Songwriters: Jimmy Robbins; Laura Veltz; Maren Morris
- Producer: Greg Kurstin

Maren Morris promotional singles chronology
"You All Over Me" (2021)	"Background Music" (2022)	"Nervous" (2022)

Music video
- "Background Music" on YouTube

"Background Music" is a song by American singer Maren Morris. It was released on February 11, 2022, as the first promotional single of her third studio album, Humble Quest (2022). Written by Morris, Laura Veltz, and Jimmy Robbins, the mid-tempo song combines elements of R&B and country while exploring themes of love, mortality, and legacy. It was promoted with a performance on NPR Music's Tiny Desk Concert.

== Background and release ==
Ahead of its release, on February 4, 2022, Morris teased "Background Music" on her social media by posting a photograph alongside the lyric, "Not everybody gets to leave a souvenir". She also shared the song's full chorus on TikTok, joking, "Is a full chorus a leak?". According to Morris, the song is about "the beauty of the temporary"; although "the romanticism of eternity sounds nice", she prefers the idea of appreciating things because they are "not entitled to" us "in perpetuity".

Co-writer Laura Veltz said "Background Music" grew out of conversations about "the passing of time", mortality, and what people leave behind. She described "Not everybody gets to leave a souvenir" as her favorite lyric, calling it "the most true statement" and saying the writing session was the first time she, Morris, and Jimmy Robbins "collectively made ourselves cry".

== Composition ==
Co-written by Veltz and Robbins, a mid-tempo song "Background Music" combines elements of R&B and country. It lyrically reflects on love, mortality, and legacy; addressed to Morris's husband Ryan Hurd, the song expresses a promise to love him for the rest of their lives while contemplating how they will be remembered after their deaths.

== Promotion and reception ==
Morris performed "Background Music" at NPR Music's Tiny Desk Concert, held in her hometown Nashville, Tennessee. Writing for Billboard, Melinda Newman described the song as a "tender waltz" that explores the fleeting nature of time and love alongside the enduring quality of art. Newman also noted that it finds comfort in the idea that, although its subjects may one day be forgotten, the music they create will endure.

== Personnel ==
Credits were adapted from Tidal.

- Maren Morris – lead vocals, songwriter
- Greg Kurstin – producer, recording engineer, acoustic guitar, bass, drums, electric guitar, keyboards
- Jimmy Robbins – songwriter
- Laura Veltz – songwriter
- Julian Burg – recording engineer
- Serban Ghenea – mixing engineer
- Randy Merrill – mastering engineer
- Bryce Bordone – assistant engineer
- Matt Tuggle – assistant engineer
