= Nervous (Maren Morris song) =

Promotional single by Maren Morris

from the album Humble Quest
- Released: March 11, 2022
- Length: 2:56
- Label: Sony
- Songwriters: Jimmy Robbins; Maren Morris; Natalie Hemby
- Producer: Greg Kurstin

Maren Morris promotional singles chronology
| "Background Music" (2022) | "Nervous" (2022) |

Audio video
- "Nervous" on YouTube

"Nervous" is a song by American singer Maren Morris. It was released on March 11, 2022, as the second promotional single of her third studio album, Humble Quest (2022). Written by Morris, Jimmy Robbins, and Natalie Hemby, the mid-tempo song combines elements of country, alternative rock, pop, and grunge rock.

== Background and release ==
Morris wrote "Nervous" with Natalie Hemby and Jimmy Robbins after Hemby brought the song's title to the session. She said they intentionally avoided making the production and vocals "too slick", instead leaning into "this really sexual, empowering vibe". Morris also credited Hemby with inspiring the song's vivid imagery and said she "took the training wheels off" vocally by belting the song. Discussing the song's sound, Morris said she does not think in terms of genre, adding that "[her] vocal and [her] lyrics" determine "what the compass is on each song's influence". She cited "Nervous" as an example, saying she would not describe herself as "officially a country artist".

== Composition ==
Co-written by Morris, Robbins, and Hemby, the mid-tempo track "Nervous" blends country songwriting with elements of alternative rock, pop, and grunge rock. Its lyrics describe the emotional vulnerability and attraction the narrator experiences in a romantic relationship. According to Billboard's Tom Roland, the song explores themes of "psychosexual passion" and emotional sensitivity.

== Personnel ==
Credits were adapted from Tidal.

- Maren Morris – lead vocals, songwriter
- Greg Kurstin – producer, recording engineer, acoustic guitar, bass, drums, electric guitar, keyboards, percussion
- Jimmy Robbins – songwriter, overdub engineer
- Natalie Hemby – songwriter
- Julian Burg – recording engineer
- Serban Ghenea – mixing engineer
- Randy Merrill – mastering engineer
- Bryce Bordone – assistant engineer
- Matt Tuggle – assistant engineer

== Charts ==
Weekly chart performance
| Chart (2020) | Peak position |
|---|---|
| US Hot Country Songs (Billboard) | 32 |
