= GLAAD Excellence in Media Award =

The GLAAD Excellence in Media Award is a special GLAAD Media Award presented annually by the Gay & Lesbian Alliance Against Defamation at the GLAAD Media Awards ceremony held in New York City. It is presented to public figures in media and entertainment who, through their work, have increased the visibility and understanding of the LGBT community. In 2023, it was named in honor of Barbara Gittings.

== List of recipients ==
- 1996 – Barbara Walters
- 1998 – Bob Weinstein, Harvey Weinstein
- 2001 – Vanessa Redgrave
- 2002 – Glenn Close
- 2003 – Diane Sawyer
- 2004 – Julianne Moore
- 2005 – Billy Crystal
- 2006 – Amanda McKeon
- 2007 – Patti LaBelle
- 2008 – Judy Shepard
- 2009 – Tyra Banks
- 2010 – Joy Behar
- 2011 – Russell Simmons
- 2015 – Kelly Ripa
- 2016 – Robert De Niro
- 2017 – Debra Messing
- 2018 – Ava DuVernay
- 2022 – Judith Light
- 2023 – Maren Morris, Los Angeles Blade and The Washington Blade
- 2024 – Jennifer Hudson
- 2025 – Q.Digital
