= Rich (Maren Morris song) =

Single by Maren Morris

from the album Hero
- Released: February 12, 2018
- Genre: Country; reggae; hip hop
- Length: 3:28
- Label: Columbia Nashville
- Songwriters: Maren Morris; Jessie Jo Dillon; Laura Veltz
- Producers: Busbee; Maren Morris

Maren Morris singles chronology
"The Middle" (2018)	"Rich" (2018)	"Seeing Blind" (2018)

Music video
- "Rich" on YouTube

"Rich" is a song by American singer Maren Morris for her major-label debut studio album, Hero (2016). Morris co-wrote the song with Jessie Jo Dillon and Laura Veltz, and co-produced the track with Busbee. It was released to American country radio on February 12, 2018, through Columbia Nashville as the album's fourth and final single.

== Composition ==
"Rich" blends elements of country music with reggae and hip hop for a sound that "transcends classification." The song features "laid-back, breezy" vocals in the verses and a "singalong" chorus. Lyrically, the song details ways that a man has done Morris wrong, framed by hypothetical dollar values for these infractions that would result in Morris being rich. According to critics, Morris's delivery expresses "hip-hop bravado" and a "sly wit" as she toys with unconventional rhymes.

== Release and promotion ==
On January 22, 2018, "Rich" was announced as the album's final single and was made available to radio through the Daily Play MPE service. It was released on February 12. According to Morris, the choice was influenced by positive fan reception to the song, noting that it was "the first time we've really let fans pick the single." The announcement came days after news of the release of her Zedd collaboration, "The Middle", which was promoted concurrently to pop formats and internationally. "Rich" officially impacted country radio on February 12, 2018.

== Music video ==
The music video was directed by TK McKamy and Produced by Joel Hartz and premiered on CMT, GAC, CMT Music & VEVO in 2018.

== Critical reception ==
In a review of Hero, Jon Caramanica of the New York Times wrote that the song was positioned as "CMT's bid for Song of the Summer" due to its strong hook and crossover potential. Chuck Dauphin of Billboard wrote that "Rich" blends humor with "more than just a little" truth, which he called "a sign of her deep intelligence as a composer." Brittney McKenna of Rolling Stone called "Rich" the highlight of Hero and wrote that it is "a genre-defying amalgam of what makes today's country music interesting: a little profanity, a lot of swagger and catchy hooks for days."

=== Accolades ===
Best-of lists
Publication	Rank	List
Billboard	3	Maren Morris' 10 Best Songs
Rolling Stone	6	25 Best Country Songs of 2016

== Lyrical changes ==
On September 19, 2024, when Morris performed the song at the Bourbon & Beyond music festival, she removed the Diddy reference from the lyric “Me and Diddy drippin’ diamonds like Marilyn” of the song and replaced it with a reference to Dolly Parton, following his recent arrest.

== Commercial performance ==
"Rich" debuted at number 50 on the Billboard Country Airplay chart dated February 24, 2018 and was the week's highest debut. On the week dated October 6, the song debuted at number 96 on the Billboard Hot 100 and peaked at number 62 the week dated December 1, remaining on the chart for eight weeks. The song has sold 159,000 copies in the United States as of December 2018.

== Charts ==
=== Weekly charts ===
Chart (2018)	Peak position
Canada Country (Billboard)	2
US Billboard Hot 100	62
US Country Airplay (Billboard)	4
US Hot Country Songs (Billboard)	8

=== Year-end charts ===
Chart (2018)	Position
US Country Airplay (Billboard)	35
US Hot Country Songs (Billboard)	44

== Certifications ==
Region	Certification	Certified units/sales
Canada (Music Canada)	Gold	40,000^{‡}
United States (RIAA)	Platinum	1,000,000^{‡}
^{‡} Sales+streaming figures based on certification alone.
