= Humble Quest =

Studio album by Maren Morris
- Released: March 25, 2022
- Genre: Country pop
- Length: 37:28
- Label: Columbia Nashville
- Producer: Greg Kurstin

Maren Morris chronology
Maren Morris Live from Chicago (2020)	Humble Quest (2022)	Intermission (2024)

Singles from Humble Quest
- 1. "Circles Around This Town" Released: January 7, 2022; 2. "I Can't Love You Anymore" Released: September 26, 2022

Humble Quest is the third studio album by American singer and songwriter Maren Morris. The album was released on March 25, 2022, through Columbia Nashville. The album earned three nominations at the 65th Annual Grammy Awards, including for Best Country Album, while the lead single "Circles Around This Town" was nominated for Best Country Song and Best Country Solo Performance.

== Composition and themes ==
Morris is a co-writer on all eleven tracks, collaborating with Sarah Aarons, Julia Michaels, Ryan Hurd, Natalie Hemby, Hillary Lindsey, Lori McKenna and Liz Rose. Production was handled by Greg Kurstin. In an interview by NPR, Morris explained the meaning and title of the project:

"I always thought that was such an interesting word, because it does mean that you're grounded and you don't have a big head about something – but I think that for me, over the last two years, that word has changed. I think it means you're the closest to your compass that you've ever been. It's not for public consumption of how relatable you are. [...] I think taking that power back with that word is why I wrote the song "Humble Quest" – how it's going to be an ongoing conversation and journey and will probably never end. And I'm okay with that. We're all just awkwardly feeling our way through this weird world."

The song "What Would This World Do" is a tribute to Michael Busbee, the producer who worked on each of Morris’ previous records and died from brain cancer in 2019.

== Release and promotion ==
The album's lead single "Circles Around This Town" was released on January 7, 2022. "I Can't Love You Anymore" was released as the album's second single on September 26, 2022.

On November 4, 2022, Morris released a companion album, Humble Quest: In Rare Form, featuring stripped-back versions of seven of the album's tracks.

== Reception ==
Professional ratings
Aggregate scores
Source	Rating
Metacritic	81/100
Review scores
Source	Rating
AllMusic	4/5 stars
Entertainment Weekly	B+
Pitchfork	8.0/10
Riff Magazine	8/10
Rolling Stone	3.5/5 stars
Sputnikmusic	3/5

Sam Sodomsky by Pitchfork defined the album "creatively adventurous" pointing out that "the gentle approach of Humble Quest feels antithetical to the dominating trends of today’s pop music", because in the album "Morris sounds mostly pleased to be herself". Writing for Consequence Mary Siroky find out that it is "a more organic record than its predecessor; [...] attributes both to the no-pressure timeline while writing the tracks and the distance from Nashville" and that the album "offers chances for longtime listeners to enjoy some of the things for which Morris has become so beloved" as of "authenticity, massive vocals, and a bit of lyrical playfulness". Billboard wrote that the production is "intimacy permeates the often subtle" witch let the "listener into different corners of her world" becoming "her most inviting work".

== Accolades ==
Year	Ceremony	Award	Result	Ref.
2022	CMA Awards	Album of the Year	Nominated	
2023	Grammy Awards	Best Country Album	Nominated	

== Track listing ==
Humble Quest track listing
No.	Title	Writer(s)	Length
1.	"Circles Around This Town"	Maren Morris; Jimmy Robbins; Julia Michaels; Ryan Hurd	3:15
2.	"The Furthest Thing"	Morris; Hurd; Greg Kurstin	3:53
3.	"I Can't Love You Anymore"	Morris; Hurd; Kurstin	2:49
4.	"Humble Quest"	Morris; Robbins; Laura Veltz	3:24
5.	"Background Music"	Morris; Robbins; Veltz	3:34
6.	"Nervous"	Morris; Robbins; Natalie Hemby	2:55
7.	"Tall Guys"	Morris; Hemby; Aaron Raitiere	2:43
8.	"Detour"	Morris; Kurstin; Veltz; Sarah Aarons	4:07
9.	"Hummingbird"	Morris; Hillary Lindsey; Lori McKenna; Liz Rose	3:19
10.	"Good Friends"	Morris; Kurstin; Hemby	3:28
11.	"What Would This World Do?"	Morris; Hurd; Jon Green	4:01
Total length:			37:28

== Personnel ==
Musicians

- Rich Hinman – pedal steel guitar
- Ryan Hurd – background vocals
- Greg Kurstin – acoustic guitar, bass guitar, drums, electric guitar, Fender Rhodes, Hammond organ, keyboards, percussion, piano, Wurlitzer
- Bennett Lewis – Dobro, mandolin
- Julia Michaels – background vocals on "Circles Around This Town"
- Maren Morris – lead vocals, background vocals

Technical

- Greg Kurstin – production, engineering
- Randy Merrill – mastering
- Serban Ghenea – mixing
- Julian Burg – engineering
- Jimmy Robbins – engineering
- Matt Tuggle – engineering
- Alberto Vaz – engineering
- Bryce Bordone – mix engineering

Visuals

- Harper Smith – creative direction, package design, photography

== Commercial success ==
Humble Quest makes the Guinness World Records for most first-day and first-week streams for a country album by a female artist on Amazon Music.

== Charts ==
Chart performance for Humble Quest
Chart (2022)	Peak position
Canadian Albums (Billboard)	60
Scottish Albums (Official Charts)	28
UK Country Albums (Official Charts)	3
UK Album Downloads (Official Charts)	24
US Billboard 200	21
US Top Country Albums (Billboard)	2
