= The Middle (Zedd, Maren Morris and Grey song) =

2018 single by Zedd, Maren Morris, and Grey

Single by Zedd, Maren Morris, and Grey
- Released: 23 January 2018
- Genre: Dance-pop
- Length: 3:04
- Label: Interscope
- Songwriters: Jordan Johnson; Anton Zaslavski; Sarah Aarons; Kyle Trewartha; Stefan Johnson; Michael Trewartha; Marcus Lomax
- Producers: Zedd; Grey; The Monsters and the Strangerz

Zedd singles chronology
"Get Low" (2017)	"The Middle" (2018)	"Stay" (covered by Riri) (2018)

Maren Morris singles chronology
"Craving You" (2017)	"The Middle" (2018)	"Rich" (2018)

Grey singles chronology
"I Miss You" (2017)	"The Middle" (2018)	"Want You Back" (2019)

Music video
- "The Middle" on YouTube

"The Middle" is a song by Russian-German record producer Zedd, American country music singer Maren Morris, and American musical duo Grey. It was written by Sarah Aarons, The Monsters and the Strangerz, Grey and Zedd with production handled by the latter three. The song was released commercially for digital download and streaming on 23 January 2018 by Interscope Records. It reached number one in Singapore and the top ten in the US, the UK and several other countries. It was nominated for Record of the Year, Song of the Year, and Best Pop Duo/Group Performance at the 61st Annual Grammy Awards.

== Background and development ==
=== Release ===
The song was first revealed in an accompanying interview of Zedd's cover shot for Billboard, published on 10 August 2017. Zedd played interviewer Chris Martins unreleased material in a studio, one of which was "The Middle", which featured co-writer Sarah Aarons as a demo singer.

On 11 January 2018, Zedd teased the song on social media, saying: "Hey guys, it's that time again. I wanted to show you a preview to my brand new song. Check it out," after which he played a short snippet of the song. The collaboration was officially announced via social media on 19 January 2018, along with the single artwork, which Zedd teased a day earlier without a title on it.

=== Collaboration ===
Zedd explained in a press release that they "worked really hard on this record to get it just right". He also opened up about the opportunity to work with both collaborators, saying that working with Maren Morris was "super fun because she is clearly an amazing singer and very talented musician", and that he loves working with Grey because they strive to "make the best music possible".

Morris added: "Zedd was so great to work with and so easy-going, it felt like we'd been working together for years. The sound is reflective of my many influences as an artist – a little bit country, little pop, little R&B, relatable, emotional and catchy as hell. There are no limits with this song and I can't wait to see how the fans react." She revealed in a statement that she recorded her vocal for the song with Zedd in Nashville "several weeks ago" before the song's release. Grey admitted that they faced a few obstacles during production, but they "kept fighting for it" because the song was special.

=== Vocal demos ===
Demi Lovato, Camila Cabello, Anne-Marie, Carly Rae Jepsen, Tove Lo, Bishop Briggs, Bebe Rexha, Lauren Jauregui, Daya, Charli XCX, Elle King, Elley Duhé and Lennon Stella all recorded demos of the song before Morris' version was selected.

Stefan Johnson, one-fifth of production team The Monsters and the Strangerz, stated that "it was a super long process." Jordan Johnson of the same team added: "We never lost the feeling for that song. Even a year later, I, as a creator hadn't gotten tired of it. It was special."

The first iteration of the song (before Zedd and Grey were attached) was intended to be a single for Lovato (who had released a song with the same name on her 2008 album Don't Forget), but she passed after deciding the song was "too pop" and opted to release "Sorry Not Sorry" instead. Once Zedd and Grey were brought on board, Cabello's version was selected but she pulled out two weeks prior to the song's release in order to focus on promoting "Havana". After Cabello backed out, Anne-Marie's version was chosen but she had to back out due to conflicts stemming from the release of "Friends". After plans to release Anne-Marie's version fell through, the production team discovered that Morris had recorded a version but that it was never reviewed when initially submitted for consideration. Once the production team heard Morris' version, it was selected for the final cut.

Rexha's demo leaked online in 2018, Cabello's demo leaked in 2020 while Lovato's, XCX's and Briggs' demos leaked in 2021. Sarah Aarons' original demo leaked online in 2022, including the demo of her second rendition have also leaked in 2023. Anne-Marie's full demo leaked online in 2023.

== Critical reception ==
Kat Bein of Billboard opined that the song is "relatively sparse with cute, lively flourishes", writing that it has "definite sonic similarities" to Zedd's previous song "Stay". Rolling Stone's Brittney McKenna deemed the song "an infectious earworm" in which Morris "strays from her country roots". She felt that the "Nineties R&B-indebted, vocoder-driven chorus" recalls the sound of "Stay", and that Morris "deftly occupies the new, poppy space". Hugh McIntyre of Fuse found Morris' appearance on the track surprising, "considering the genres she primarily works in", as he praised Morris for "supplying vocals perfectly". He felt that it "leans a lot more pop than electro", which makes the song more appealing to a broader variety of listeners. Regarding the song "an easy-to-love electronic smash" and "a slightly reductive mix" of "Stay" and "Starving", he noted that it is "not entirely original" due to its "reminiscence of what the musicians have delivered before". Similarly, Madeline Roth of MTV News called the song "a poppy earworm" and a combination of "Stay" and "Starving", which is "catchy as hell and practically destined for radio domination". Mike Nied of Idolator wrote that the song "blends elements of country and EDM" and praised Morris for providing "impassioned vocals". Billy Dukes of Taste of Country described the song as "an unlikely combination of EDM, '90s pop and modern country music".

== Music video ==
The song's music video, directed by Dave Meyers, was premiered via Target's commercial space during the 60th Annual Grammy Awards. On 25 April, Zedd released a vertical video on YouTube. The dancing was choreographed by Nadine "Hi-Hat" Ruffin, with 50 dancers featured including Lele Pons, Jade Chynoweth, and Willdabeast Adams. More than 400 extras worked on the video.

== Live performances ==
On 28 April 2018, Zedd and Maren Morris performed the song live for the first time at the Omnia nightclub in Las Vegas. On 20 May 2018, all three artists performed the song at the 2018 Billboard Music Awards. Morris performed the song with Taylor Swift at the Arlington stop of Swift's Reputation Stadium Tour on 5 October 2018. On 26 October 2019, Jess Moskaluke and The Hunter Brothers performed the song at the opening ceremonies of the 2019 NHL Heritage Classic in Regina, Saskatchewan, located roughly midway between the home cities of the participating Calgary Flames and Winnipeg Jets along the Trans-Canada Highway.

== Awards and nominations ==
Year	Organization	Award	Result
2018	Radio Disney Music Awards	Song of the Year	Nominated
2018	Radio Disney Music Awards	Best Dance Track	Nominated
2018	Radio Disney Music Awards	Best Collaboration	Nominated
2018	Teen Choice Awards	Choice Collaboration	Nominated
2018	Teen Choice Awards	Choice Electronic/Dance Song	Nominated
2018	American Music Awards	Collaboration of the Year	Nominated
2019	Grammy Awards	Record of the Year	Nominated
2019	Grammy Awards	Song of the Year	Nominated
2019	Grammy Awards	Best Pop Duo/Group Performance	Nominated
2019	iHeartRadio Music Awards	Song of the Year	Won
2019	iHeartRadio Music Awards	Best Collaboration	Nominated
2019	iHeartRadio Music Awards	Dance Song of the Year	Won
2019	APRA Music Awards	Most Played Australian Work	Won
2019	APRA Music Awards	Dance Work of the Year	Won

== Commercial performance ==
The song reached No. 5 on Billboard Hot 100. As of February 2019, it had sold 771,000 copies in the United States. In January 2021, "The Middle" surpassed 1 billion streams on Spotify, the first song to do so for all three artists.

== Track listings ==
- Digital download
1. "The Middle" – 3:04
- CD single
1. "The Middle" – 3:05
2. "The Middle" (instrumental) – 3:02
- Digital download - Remixes
1. "The Middle (Marc Benjamin Remix)" - 3:45
2. "The Middle (Bougenvilla Remix)" - 3:54
3. "The Middle (Curbi Remix)" - 4:11
4. "The Middle (UNKWN Remix)" - 3:01
5. "The Middle (Maliboux Remix)" - 3:53

== Personnel ==
Credits adapted from Tidal.

- Zedd – production, mixing
- Grey – production, mixing
- The Monsters and the Strangerz – production
- Tom Norris – mixing

== Charts ==
=== Weekly charts ===
Weekly chart performance for "The Middle"
Chart (2018–2019)	Peak position
Australia (ARIA)	7
Austria (Ö3 Austria Top 40)	12
Belgium (Ultratop 50 Flanders)	8
Belgium Dance (Ultratop Flanders)	5
Belgium (Ultratop 50 Wallonia)	20
Belgium Dance (Ultratop Wallonia)	1
Brazil (Crowley Charts)	92
Canada Hot 100 (Billboard)	6
Canada AC (Billboard)	1
Canada CHR/Top 40 (Billboard)	1
Canada Hot AC (Billboard)	1
Colombia (National-Report)	34
Czech Republic Airplay (ČNS IFPI)	4
Czech Republic Singles Digital (ČNS IFPI)	8
Denmark (Tracklisten)	20
France (SNEP)	54
Germany (GfK)	15
Germany Dance (Official German Charts)	3
Hungary (Rádiós Top 40)	19
Hungary (Single Top 40)	8
Ireland (IRMA)	7
Italy (FIMI)	42
Japan Hot 100 (Billboard)	50
Malaysia (RIM)	3
Mexico Airplay (Billboard)	11
Netherlands (Dutch Top 40)	2
Netherlands (Single Top 100)	7
New Zealand (Recorded Music NZ)	8
Nicaragua (Monitor Latino)	13
Norway (VG-lista)	10
Portugal (AFP)	19
Scottish Singles Sales (Official Charts)	8
Singapore (RIAS)	1
Slovakia Airplay (ČNS IFPI)	46
Slovakia Singles Digital (ČNS IFPI)	15
Slovenia (SloTop50)	18
Spain (Promusicae)	70
Sweden (Sverigetopplistan)	19
Switzerland (Schweizer Hitparade)	27
UK Singles (Official Charts)	7
US Billboard Hot 100	5
US Adult Contemporary (Billboard)	1
US Adult Pop Airplay (Billboard)	1
US Dance Club Songs (Billboard)	17
US Hot Dance/Electronic Songs (Billboard)	1
US Pop Airplay (Billboard)	1
US Radio Songs (Billboard)	1
US Rhythmic Airplay (Billboard)	18
Venezuela English (Record Report)	1

=== Year-end charts ===
2018 year-end chart performance for "The Middle"
Chart (2018)	Position
Australia (ARIA)	15
Austria (Ö3 Austria Top 40)	34
Belgium (Ultratop Flanders)	24
Belgium (Ultratop Wallonia)	97
Canada (Canadian Hot 100)	12
Denmark (Tracklisten)	47
France (SNEP)	155
Germany (Official German Charts)	49
Hungary (Rádiós Top 40)	67
Iceland (Plötutíóindi)	22
Ireland (IRMA)	21
Italy (FIMI)	80
Japan Hot Overseas (Billboard Japan)	6
Netherlands (Dutch Top 40)	6
Netherlands (Single Top 100)	27
New Zealand (Recorded Music NZ)	21
Portugal (AFP)	55
Romania (Airplay 100)	89
Slovenia (SloTop50)	46
Sweden (Sverigetopplistan)	59
Switzerland (Schweizer Hitparade)	68
UK Singles (Official Charts Company)	35
US Billboard Hot 100	8
US Radio Songs (Billboard)	2
US Adult Contemporary (Billboard)	5
US Adult Top 40 (Billboard)	3
US Hot Dance/Electronic Songs (Billboard)	1
US Mainstream Top 40 (Billboard)	2

2019 year-end chart performance for "The Middle"
Chart (2019)	Position
US Adult Contemporary (Billboard)	4
US Hot Dance/Electronic Songs (Billboard)	5

=== Decade-end charts ===
2010s-end chart performance for "The Middle"
Chart (2010–2019)	Position
US Hot Dance/Electronic Songs (Billboard)	3

== Certifications ==
Certifications for "The Middle"
Region	Certification	Certified units/sales
Australia (ARIA)	10× Platinum	700,000^{‡}
Austria (IFPI Austria)	Platinum	30,000^{‡}
Belgium (BRMA)	Platinum	20,000^{‡}
Brazil (Pro-Música Brasil)	2× Diamond	320,000^{‡}
Canada (Music Canada)	9× Platinum	720,000^{‡}
Denmark (IFPI Danmark)	Platinum	90,000^{‡}
France (SNEP)	Platinum	200,000^{‡}
Germany (BVMI)	Gold	200,000^{‡}
Italy (FIMI)	Platinum	50,000^{‡}
Mexico (AMPROFON)	Platinum+Gold	90,000^{‡}
New Zealand (RMNZ)	5× Platinum	150,000^{‡}
Poland (ZPAV)	Platinum	20,000^{‡}
Portugal (AFP)	Platinum	10,000^{‡}
Spain (Promusicae)	Platinum	60,000^{‡}
United Kingdom (BPI)	2× Platinum	1,200,000^{‡}
United States (RIAA)	6× Platinum	6,000,000^{‡}
Streaming
Japan (RIAJ)	Gold	50,000,000^{†}
Sweden (GLF)	Gold	4,000,000^{†}
^{‡} Sales+streaming figures based on certification alone.^{†} Streaming-only figures based on certification alone.

== Release history ==
Release dates for "The Middle"
Region	Date	Format	Label	Ref.
Various	23 January 2018	Digital download; streaming	Interscope	
United States	30 January 2018	Contemporary hit radio	Interscope	
Germany	16 March 2018	CD single	Interscope	

== See also ==
- List of number-one songs of 2018 (Singapore)
- List of number-one adult contemporary singles of 2018 (U.S.)
- List of Billboard Mainstream Top 40 number-one songs of 2018
- List of highest-certified singles in Australia
