= I Could Use a Love Song =

Single by Maren Morris

from the album Hero
- Released: March 27, 2017
- Genre: Country
- Length: 3:15
- Label: Columbia Nashville
- Songwriters: Maren Morris; Jimmy Robbins; Laura Veltz
- Producers: Busbee; Maren Morris

Maren Morris singles chronology
"80s Mercedes" (2016)	"I Could Use a Love Song" (2017)	"Craving You" (2017)

Music video
- "I Could Use a Love Song" on YouTube

"I Could Use a Love Song" is a song by American singer Maren Morris for her debut studio album, Hero (2016). Morris wrote the song with Jimmy Robbins and Laura Veltz, and co-produced the track with busbee. It was released to North American country radio on March 27, 2017, through Columbia Nashville as the album's third single. A song about heartbreak and finding redemption through love, it garnered positive reviews from critics.

"I Could Use a Love Song" reached number one on the US Country Airplay chart, giving Morris her second number-one single, and her first as a solo artist. It also peaked at numbers seven and 56 on both the US Hot Country Songs and Billboard Hot 100 charts, respectively. The song was certified Platinum and has sold 206,000 copies as of December 2017. It achieved similar chart success in Canada, reaching number 14 on the Country chart and garnering a Platinum certification from Music Canada, denoting sales of over 80,000 units in that country.

== Content ==
"I Could Use a Love Song" is a "no frills heartbreak song" that finds the narrator becoming jaded towards love. Despite having been burned by previous relationships, Morris remains optimistic and believes that a love song can restore her faith in finding love.

== Background and release ==
"I Could Use a Love Song" was announced as the album's third single on February 24, 2017. The song was made available to country radio on March 13, but did not officially impact the format until March 27, 2017.

== Critical reception ==
Billy Dukes of Taste of Country reviewed the song favorably. He wrote that "I Could Use a Love Song" is "more immediately accessible than her previous two radio hits," and praised Morris for expressing a new side to her artistry.

=== Accolades ===
Year	Association	Category	Result
2018	Grammy Awards	Best Country Solo Performance	Nominated

== Music video ==
The music video of the song was released on May 6, 2017, and starred Shelley Hennig and Garrett Hines as the couple.

== Commercial performance ==
"I Could Use a Love Song" debuted at number 56 on the US Country Airplay chart dated April 1, 2017 and was the week's highest-debuting single. On the week dated September 2, the song debuted at number 97 on the US Billboard Hot 100 before dropping to number 100 the week of September 9, and left the week after. The track reappeared on the chart dated September 23 at number 92 and reached number 56 the week of January 20, 2018 before leaving the chart completely, remaining there for twenty-one weeks. It has sold 206,000 copies in the United States as of December 2017. It peaked at number one on the Country Airplay chart dated January 20, giving Morris her second number one single and her first as a solo artist.

== Charts ==
=== Weekly charts ===
Chart (2017–2018)	Peak position
Canada Country (Billboard)	14
US Billboard Hot 100	56
US Country Airplay (Billboard)	1
US Hot Country Songs (Billboard)	7

=== Year-end charts ===
Chart (2017)	Position
Canada Country (Billboard)	31
US Country Airplay (Billboard)	44
US Hot Country Songs (Billboard)	25

Chart (2018)	Position
US Country Airplay (Billboard)	51
US Hot Country Songs (Billboard)	70

== Certifications ==
Region	Certification	Certified units/sales
Canada (Music Canada)	Platinum	80,000^{‡}
United States (RIAA)	Platinum	1,000,000^{‡}
^{‡} Sales+streaming figures based on certification alone.

== Release history ==
Region	Date	Format	Label	Ref.
Canada	March 27, 2017	Country radio	Sony Music Canada	
United States	March 27, 2017	Country radio	Columbia Nashville	
