= Hero (Maren Morris album) =

- Standard cover

Studio album by Maren Morris
- Released: June 3, 2016
- Recorded: 2015–2016
- Studios: Sunset Sound (Los Angeles, California); Grand Victor Sound; Blackbird; Eastside; The Tzudio; Jane's Place; Hill; Sound Emporium (Nashville, Tennessee); Azteca Market (Glassell Park, California); Lula Recording (New York); Sound of Sterloid (Encino, California); The Birdhouse (Glendale, California)
- Genres: Country; pop
- Length: 37:49
- Label: Columbia Nashville
- Producers: Busbee; Ian Fitchuk; Brad Hill; Maren Morris; Brett Tyler

Maren Morris chronology
Maren Morris (2015)	Hero (2016)	Girl (2019)

Singles from Hero
- 1. "My Church" Released: January 19, 2016; 2. "80s Mercedes" Released: June 27, 2016; 3. "I Could Use a Love Song" Released: March 27, 2017; 4. "Rich" Released: February 12, 2018

Singles from Hero: A Second Wind
- 1. "Sugar (Original Demo)" Released: June 3, 2026; 2. "Hard Liquor and Soft Rock" Released: June 5, 2026

Hero (stylized in all caps) is the major-label debut studio album by American singer Maren Morris. It was released on June 3, 2016, through Columbia Nashville, marking her first release on the label. The album peaked at number five on the US Billboard 200 and was nominated for Best Country Album at the 59th Annual Grammy Awards.

== Background and packaging ==
Before signing a major-label recording contract, Morris spent nearly a decade releasing independent albums after beginning her recording career at age 15. During that period, she also established herself as a songwriter, with Kelly Clarkson and Tim McGraw among the artists who recorded her compositions.

In August 2015, Morris self-released five songs as a self-titled extended play (EP), Maren Morris, on Spotify. It garnered 2.5 million streams on the platform in a month, and its three songs appeared on the Spotify's US and Global "Viral 50" chart. The EP's success attracted the interests from various record labels, which led Morris eventually sign to Columbia Nashville in September that year. The label then re-released the EP on November 6, with "My Church" as the lead single.

The success of "My Church" was followed by the release of Morris's major-label debut and fourth overall studio album release, Hero. All tracks from the self-titled EP are included on the album, with "Company You Keep" included on the deluxe edition. The additional songs in the album were co-written with Chris DeStefano, Natalie Hemby, Shane McAnally, and others. Morris has writing credits on all the songs in the album.

== Release and promotion ==
"My Church" was released on January 19, 2016, as the Hero's lead single. She released its music video a week later. A commercial success, it reached number 5 on the US Hot Country Songs and number 50 on the US Billboard Hot 100. Nominated for Best Country Song, it won Best Country Solo Performance at the 59th Annual Grammy Awards. The album's second single "80s Mercedes" was serviced to country radio on June 27, with the accompanying music video released on August 8. It reached numbers 74 and 11 on the Hot 100 and Hot Country Songs charts, respectively.

Hero's third single, "I Could Use a Love Song", became available on March 13, 2017, later impacted radio on March 27. It peaked at number 56 on the Hot 100, while reaching at number 7 on the Hot Country Songs. "Rich" was released February 12, 2018, as the album's fourth single. Morris embarked on the Hero Tour in 2017, in support of her album.

A deluxe edition of the album was released on March 17, 2017, which features the songs "Bummin' Cigarettes", "Space" and "Company You Keep". Hero's tenth anniversary edition was released on June 26, 2026, through Legacy Recordings, to digital and physical. Titled Hero: A Second Wind, it features the tracks created during the recording sessions of Hero—"We Can't Be Friends" and "Hard Liquor and Soft Rock"—as well as a demo version of "Sugar" (released on June 3), "Company You Keep," "I Wish I Was", and "Drunk Girls Don't Cry". "Hard Liquor and Soft Rock" followed on June 5.

== Critical reception ==
Professional ratings
Review scores
Source	Rating
AllMusic	5/5 stars
PopMatters	7/10
Spin	7/10
Sputnikmusic	4.5/5

Stephen Thomas Erlewine of AllMusic praised Morris's inventiveness and how she "skillfully slides between styles, blurring distinctions between genre and eras". Erlewine felt that Hero "belongs to the digital era but it's the songs – smart, sharp, and hooky – that make this a great modern pop album, regardless of genre." Jon Caramanica of The New York Times considered the album an outstanding country music debut, and "perhaps the canniest country record in recent memory." Caramanica thought Morris an "astute synthesizer" of various styles, and found the album to be "both utterly of its moment and also savvy enough to indicate how the future might sound." He also noted the profanity in some of the songs that Morris used "fluently, casually, and effectively, which is to say, you hardly notice at all as she's breaking what may be country's last remaining taboo." Sounds Like Nashville referred to Morris' songwriting talent, powerful vocals and eclectic music style that made Hero one of the most unique and enjoyable releases of 2016.

=== Accolades ===
Awards and nominations
Year	Association	Category	Result
2016	CMA Awards	Album of the Year	Nominated
2016	CMA Awards	New Artist of the Year	Won
2017	Grammy Awards	Best Country Album	Nominated
2017	ACM Awards	Album of the Year	Nominated

Year-end lists
Publication	Rank	List
AllMusic	N/A	Best Albums of 2016
American Songwriter	40	Top 50 Albums of 2016
AOL	7	Best Albums of 2016
Billboard	9	50 Best Albums of 2016
Entertainment Weekly	5	The Best Country Albums of 2016
NPR	36	50 Best Albums of 2016
People	10	The 10 Best Albums of 2016
Rolling Stone	1	40 Best Country Albums of 2016
Rolling Stone	13	50 Best Albums of 2016
Spin	47	The 50 Best Albums of 2016
Stereogum	12	The 20 Best Country Albums of 2016
Variety	7	The 10 Best Albums of 2016
Vice	44	The 100 Best Albums of 2016
Wired	N/A	Best Albums of 2016

== Commercial performance ==
In the United States, Hero debuted at number five on the Billboard 200 chart with 45,000 equivalent album units; the album sold 37,000 copies in pure sales, with the remainder of its unit total reflecting the album's streaming and track equivalent album units. It also debuted at number one on the Top Country Albums chart. As of April 2019, the album has sold 313,100 copies in the United States. On July 17, 2019, the album was certified platinum by the Recording Industry Association of America (RIAA) for combined sales and album-equivalent units of over a million units.

== Track listing ==
All tracks were produced by Morris and Busbee.

Standard track listing
No.	Title	Writer(s)	Producer(s)	Length
1.	"Sugar"	Maren Morris; Brett Tyler; Laura Veltz		3:09
2.	"Rich"	Morris; Veltz; Jessie Jo Dillon		3:28
3.	"My Church"	Morris; Busbee		3:17
4.	"I Could Use a Love Song"	Morris; Veltz; Jimmy Robbins		3:15
5.	"80s Mercedes"	Morris; Busbee		3:31
6.	"Drunk Girls Don't Cry"	Morris; Barry Dean; Luke Laird	Morris; Busbee; Brad Hill	3:32
7.	"How It's Done"	Morris; Busbee; Natalie Hemby		3:25
8.	"Just Another Thing"	Morris; Matt Dragstrem; Shane McAnally		2:58
9.	"I Wish I Was"	Morris; Hemby; Ryan Hurd	Morris; Hill	4:00
10.	"Second Wind"	Morris; McAnally; Chris DeStefano		3:19
11.	"Once"	Morris; Busbee		3:53
Total length:				37:49

Deluxe track listing
No.	Title	Writer(s)	Producer(s)	Length
12.	"Bummin' Cigarettes"	Morris; Ian Fitchuk; Heather Morgan	Morris; Fitchuk	3:07
13.	"Company You Keep"	Morris; Laird; McAnally	Morris; Busbee; Hill	3:37
14.	"Space"	Morris; Tyler; Veltz	Morris; Tyler	3:09
Total length:				47:40

Hero: A Second Wind track listing
No.	Title	Writer(s)	Producer(s)	Length
15.	"We Can't Be Friends"
16.	"Hard Liquor and Soft Rock"	Morris; Busbee; Hemby	Morris; Jon Green	2:40
17.	"Sugar" (original demo)	Morris; Veltz; Tyler	Hill	3:11
18.	"Company You Keep" (original demo)
19.	"I Wish I Was" (original demo)
20.	"Drunk Girls Don't Cry" (original demo)

=== Notes ===
- "Second Wind" was originally recorded by Kelly Clarkson and included on the deluxe edition of her 2015 album, Piece by Piece.

== Credits and personnel ==
Credits were adapted from the deluxe edition's liner notes.

=== Locations ===
==== Recording ====
- Sunset Sound; Los Angeles, California
- Grand Victor Sound; Nashville, Tennessee
- Blackbird Studios; Nashville, Tennessee
- Azteca Market; Glassell Park, California
- Eastside Studio; Nashville, Tennessee
- Lula Recording; New York
- The Tzudio; Nashville, Tennessee
- Jane's Place; Nashville, Tennessee
- Sound of Sterloid; Encino, California
- Hill Studios; Nashville, Tennessee
- Sound Emporium; Nashville, Tennessee
- The Birdhouse; Glendale, California

==== Mixing ====
- Azteca Market; Glassell Park, California
- Eastside Studio; Nashville, Tennessee
- Lula Recording; New York

==== Mastering ====
- Gateway Mastering and DVD; Portland, Maine

=== Musicians ===
- Rich Brinsfield – bass guitar
- Busbee – percussion, programming, bass guitar, keyboards, piano, Hammond B-3 organ, Wurlitzer, synthesizer, acoustic guitar, electric guitar
- Eric Darken – percussion
- Johnny Duke – electric guitar
- Fred Eltringham – drums
- Ian Fitchuk – drums, programming, bass guitar, keyboards, piano, Hammond B-3 organ, Wurlitzer, acoustic guitar, whistling, background vocals
- Joe Fox – electric guitar
- Natalie Hemby – background vocals
- Brad Hill – programming, crowd noise, background vocals
- Ryan Hurd – background vocals
- Mason Levy – programming
- Hayley McLean – electric guitar
- Carl Miner – acoustic guitar, banjo, bouzouki
- Heather Morgan – background vocals
- Maren Morris – lead vocals, background vocals
- John Osborne – electric guitar
- Aaron Sterling – drums, percussion
- Dave Thomson – background vocals
- Mark Trussell – electric guitar
- Brett Tyler – programming, bass guitar, keyboards, electric guitar, background vocals
- Laura Veltz – background vocals
- Derek Wells – acoustic guitar, electric guitar, mandolin

=== Choir singers ===
- The McCrary Sisters (Regina McCrary, Deborah McCrary, Alfreda McCrary, Allen McCrary, Beverly McCrary)

=== Technical ===
- Austin Atwood – digital editing
- Adam Ayan – mastering
- Jeff Balding – recording, engineer
- Busbee – producer (all tracks except 9, 12, 14), recording, mixing
- Dave Clauss – recording, mixing
- Eric Darken – recording
- Zach DeWall – assistant engineer
- Ian Fitchuk – producer (track 12), recording
- Kenley Flynn – production assistant (track 14 only)
- Brad Hill – production (tracks 6, 9, 13), recording
- Scott Johnson – production assistant
- Jordan Lehning – digital editing
- Amanda Miller – assistant engineer
- Maren Morris – producer
- Ernesto Olivera – assistant, drum recording assistant
- Juan Sevilla – assistant engineer
- Aaron Sterling – recording
- Morgan Stratton – drum recording assistant
- Brett Tyler – producer (track 14), recording
- Derek Wells – recording
- Brian David Willis – digital editing

== Charts ==
=== Weekly charts ===
Weekly chart performance
Chart (2016–2017)	Peak position
Australian Albums (ARIA)	69
Australian Country Albums (ARIA)	6
Canadian Albums (Billboard)	14
Scottish Albums (Official Charts)	36
UK Albums (Official Charts)	65
US Billboard 200	5
US Top Country Albums (Billboard)	1

=== Year-end charts ===
2016 year-end chart performance
Chart (2016)	Position
US Billboard 200	145
US Top Country Albums (Billboard)	21

2017 year-end chart performance
Chart (2017)	Position
US Billboard 200	106
US Top Country Albums (Billboard)	16

2018 year-end chart performance
Chart (2018)	Position
US Top Country Albums (Billboard)	32

2019 year-end chart performance
Chart (2019)	Position
US Top Country Albums (Billboard)	51

== Certifications ==
Certifications and sales
Region	Certification	Certified units/sales
Canada (Music Canada)	Gold	40,000^{‡}
United States (RIAA)	Platinum	1,000,000^{‡}
^{‡} Sales+streaming figures based on certification alone.
