= My Church =

2016 single by Maren Morris

Single by Maren Morris

from the album Hero
- Released: January 19, 2016
- Genre: Country pop
- Length: 3:17
- Label: Columbia Nashville
- Songwriters: Maren Morris; Busbee
- Producers: Busbee; Maren Morris

Maren Morris singles chronology
"My Church" (2016)	"80s Mercedes" (2016)

Music video
- "My Church" on YouTube

"My Church" is the debut single by American singer Maren Morris. It was released on January 19, 2016, as the lead single from her first studio album, Hero (2016). Morris co-wrote and -produced the song with Busbee. The song won the award for Best Country Solo Performance and was nominated for Best Country Song at the 59th Annual Grammy Awards.

== Composition ==
A country pop song, "My Church" is used figuratively to describe the sanctuary that Morris feels in her car when she plays music on the Highway FM radio while driving. It refers to listening to country icons like Johnny Cash and Hank Williams and is about "the simple joy that comes with turning up the volume, rolling down the windows and singing along to the radio at 65 miles an hour." She compares the experience to a church revival, saying, "Yeah, I guess that's my church." She co-wrote and co-produced the single with Busbee.

The song is composed in the key of A major in a 4/4 time signature with a "shuffle" tempo of approximately 76 beats per minute. It follows the chord pattern A-D-A-E-A twice. Morris' vocals range from E_{3} to C♯_{5}.

== Music video ==
The music video was premiered in January 2016. It shows Morris driving an early 1970s Mercedes Sedan, and picking up various passengers along the way. The man on the motorcycle is played by the actor Oryan Landa.

== Commercial performance ==
"My Church" entered the US Country Airplay chart at number 59. It first entered the Hot Country Songs chart at number 38 for the week of January 30, 2016, selling 6,000 copies that week. It entered the Billboard Hot 100 chart two weeks later and reached number one on the Country Digital Songs chart in another four weeks. In the US, the song had sold over 974,000 digital copies by July 2017.

== Critical reception ==
Billy Dukes of Taste of Country rated the song as a "Critic's Pick", writing that "She's a mix of Amy Winehouse, Little Big Town and pulp fiction. Beautiful images and ideas swirl around lo-fi instrumentation... A little sweetness seeps through during this soulful, blues-influenced jam".

Rolling Stone named "My Church" one of the 30 best songs of the first half of 2016. "Some keep the Sabbath going to church. Breakout Nashville star Maren Morris keeps it blazing down the freeway listening to classic country radio – with Hank Williams delivering the sermon and Johnny Cash leading the choir. Honoring tradition, this joyous popwise stomper keeps it moving forward." In 2024, the publication also ranked "My Church" at #93 on its 200 Greatest Country Songs of All Time.

Billboard ranked "My Church" at number 15 on its "100 Best Pop Songs of 2016" list. "Talk about finding your religion: On this undeniable singalong, country’s hottest newcome[r] of 2016 takes us to church via this love letter to driving with the windows down, while country radio preaches to your solo choir. Fittingly, it navigated Billboard’s Country Airplay chart for 22 weeks, even earning Maren Morris a trip to the top 10. Not a bad blessing for your first major-label single." In Village Voice's annual Pazz & Jop mass critics poll of the year's best in music in 2016, "My Church" was ranked at number 29, tied with Rihanna's "Kiss It Better" and The Weeknd's "Starboy".

=== Accolades ===
Year	Association	Category	Result
2016	CMA Awards	Best New Artist	Won
2016	CMA Awards	Single of the Year	Nominated
2016	British Country Music Association Awards	International Song of the Year	Nominated
2017	Grammy Awards	Best Country Solo Performance	Won
2017	Grammy Awards	Best Country Song	Nominated
2017	ACM Awards	Single Record of the Year	Nominated

== Charts ==
=== Weekly charts ===
Chart (2016)	Peak position
Canada Hot 100 (Billboard)	64
Canada Country (Billboard)	3
Scotland Singles (OCC)	43
UK Singles Downloads (OCC)	70
US Billboard Hot 100	50
US Country Airplay (Billboard)	9
US Hot Country Songs (Billboard)	5

=== Year-end charts ===
Chart (2016)	Position
US Country Airplay (Billboard)	38
US Hot Country Songs (Billboard)	8

== Certifications ==
Region	Certification	Certified units/sales
Canada (Music Canada)	2× Platinum	160,000^{‡}
New Zealand (RMNZ)	Gold	15,000^{‡}
United Kingdom (BPI)	Silver	200,000^{‡}
United States (RIAA)	2× Platinum	2,000,000^{‡} / 974,000
^{‡} Sales+streaming figures based on certification alone.
