= 80s Mercedes =

Single by Maren Morris

from the album Hero
- Released: June 27, 2016
- Length: 3:31
- Label: Columbia Nashville
- Songwriters: Maren Morris; Busbee
- Producers: Busbee; Maren Morris

Maren Morris singles chronology
"My Church" (2016)	"80s Mercedes" (2016)	"I Could Use a Love Song" (2017)

Music video
- "80s Mercedes" on YouTube

"80s Mercedes" is a song by American singer Maren Morris. It was released on June 27, 2016, as the second single from her debut studio album, Hero (2016). She co-wrote and co-produced the song with Busbee during a session where they traded ideas about its title and the numerous influences from that era. The accompanying music video for the song was directed by Alon Isocianu.

In the United States, "80s Mercedes" peaked at numbers 11, 12, and 74 on the Hot Country Songs, Country Airplay, and Billboard Hot 100, respectively. The song was certified Gold by the Recording Industry Association of America (RIAA) and has sold 236,000 units in the country as of January 2017. It also reached at number 17 on the Canada Country chart, receiving a Gold certification from Music Canada—denoting sales of 40,000 units in that country.

== Background ==
According to Morris, the inspiration for the song came from a conversation with Audra Mae, who used the phrase "80s Mercedes" in their conversation and she thought it would be a good title for a song. She mentioned the idea to Busbee at their song-writing session, and Busbee started asking Morris questions for possible directions on the writing. One of those questions was: "What year were you born?". Morris answered 1990, and Busbee then came out with the line: "I'm a '90s baby in my '80s Mercedes" which became the hook for the song. The song has some influences from 1980s songs, and contains an oblique reference to Don Henley's song "The Boys of Summer".

== Release and music video ==
"80s Mercedes" was released on June 27, 2016, as the second single from Morris's debut studio album, Hero (2016). Its music video, directed by Alon Isocianu and premiered in August, features a 1980s era Mercedes Benz 380 SL vehicle.

== Commercial performance ==
In the United States, "80s Mercedes" has reached number 11 on the US Hot Country Songs chart. It entered the Country Airplay chart at number 53, and has since reached number 12. The song also debuted at number 91 on the US Billboard Hot 100 and number 17 on Canada Country charts for the week of November 25, 2016. "80s Mercedes" has sold 236,000 copies as of January 2017.

== Critical reception ==
"80s Mercedes" was placed at number 38 on Rolling Stone's "50 Best Songs of 2016", stating: "The Nashville breakout star is writing cooler car songs than anyone else these days – she's a 'Nineties baby in an Eighties Mercedes', blasting Hank Williams and Johnny Cash on her radio."

=== Accolades ===
Year	Association	Category	Result
2017	Radio Disney Music Awards	Favorite Country Song	Nominated
2017	CMT Music Awards	Female Video of the Year	Nominated
2017	CMT Music Awards	Performance of the Year (with Alicia Keys on CMT Crossroads)	Nominated

== Charts ==
=== Weekly charts ===
Chart (2016–2017)	Peak position
Canada Country (Billboard)	17
US Billboard Hot 100	74
US Country Airplay (Billboard)	12
US Hot Country Songs (Billboard)	11

=== Year-end charts ===
Chart (2016)	Position
US Hot Country Songs (Billboard)	60
Chart (2017)	Position
US Hot Country Songs (Billboard)	69

== Certifications ==
Region	Certification	Certified units/sales
Canada (Music Canada)	Platinum	80,000^{‡}
United States (RIAA)	Platinum	1,000,000^{‡} / 236,000
^{‡} Sales+streaming figures based on certification alone.
