= Maren Morris =

American country singer and songwriter (born 1990)

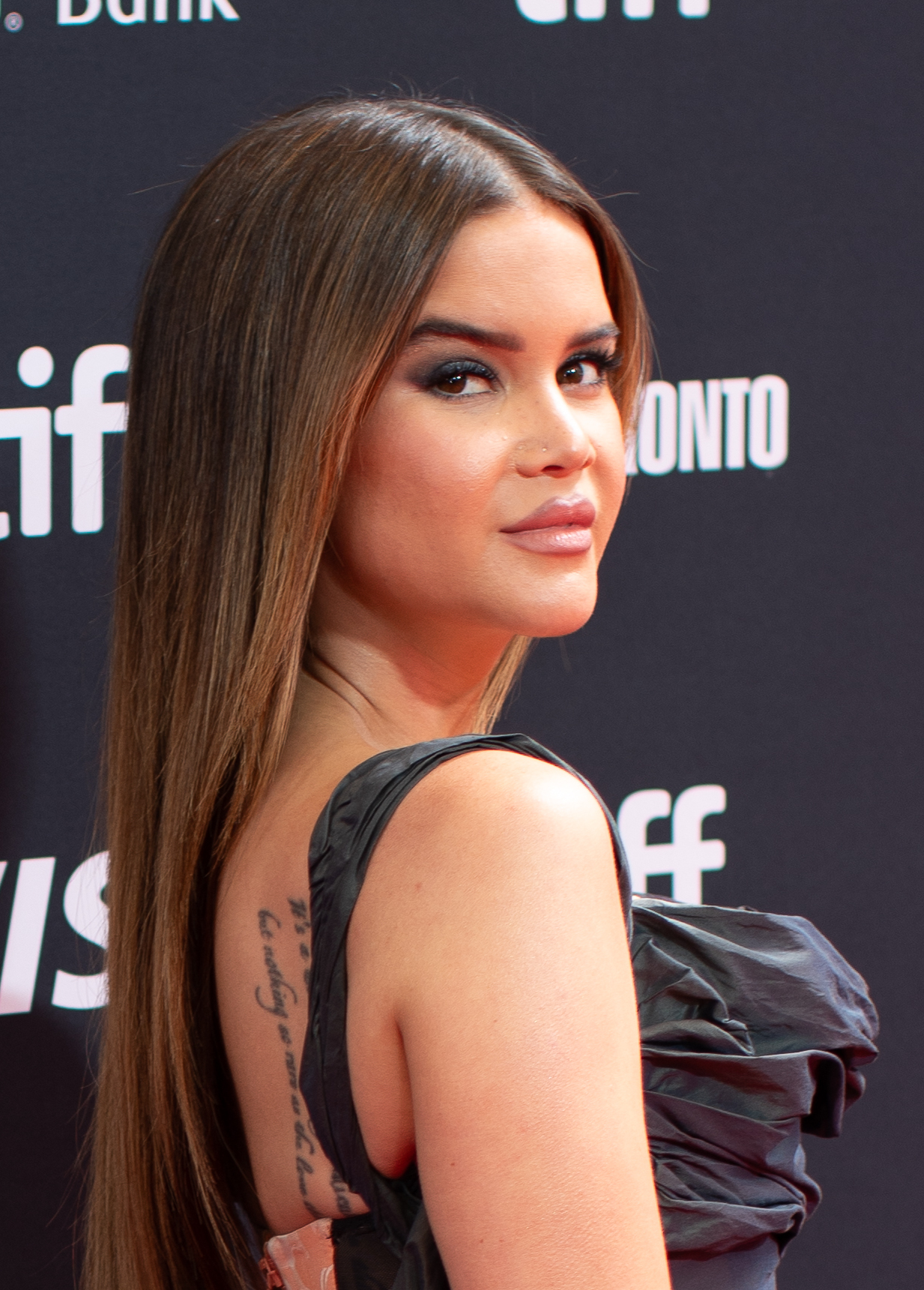
- Morris in 2024
- Born: Maren Larae Morris; April 10, 1990 (age 36); Arlington, Texas, US
- Education: University of North Texas
- Occupations: Singer; songwriter
- Years active: 2002–present
- Spouse: Ryan Hurd (m. 2018; div. 2024)
- Children: 1
- Awards: Full list
- Musical career
- Genres: Country; country pop; pop; R&B
- Instruments: Vocals; guitar
- Labels: Mozzi Bozzi; Smith; Columbia Nashville; Columbia
- Member of: The Highwomen
- Website: marenmorris.com

Maren Larae Morris (born April 10, 1990) is an American singer and songwriter. Her music has been described as country pop incorporating elements of R&B, hip-hop, and rock. Her accolades include a Grammy Award, an American Music Award, five Country Music Association Awards, and five Academy of Country Music Awards.

Morris's debut single, "My Church", from her major-label debut studio album, Hero (2016), became her breakout single at country radio and was followed by the commercially successful songs "80s Mercedes", "I Could Use a Love Song", and "Rich". In 2018, she was featured on the song "The Middle", written by Grey and Zedd, which reached the top ten in various countries.

Her second studio album, titled Girl, followed in 2019; it included number one US Country Airplay single "Girl" and number one Hot Country single "The Bones". Morris's third studio album, Humble Quest (2022), earned her a Guinness World Records for most first-day and first-week streams for a country album by a female artist on Amazon Music. Dreamsicle was released as her fourth studio album in 2025, failing to enter the both US Billboard 200 and Top Country Albums charts.

In addition to her solo work, Morris has recorded as a member of the Highwomen. She had two albums certified for sales certifications in North America and has scored three number one songs on the Country Airplay chart as well as eight top ten songs on the Hot Country Songs chart. In 2018, Morris was featured in Forbes's 30 Under 30 list. Out magazine recognized her as one of the most impactful and influential LGBTQ artists of 2024, and she was included on the Billboard Decade-End of the top 50 most successful Country Artists of the 2010s. In 2024, she was included on the Billboard list of the 100 Greatest Country Artists of All Time.

== Early life and education ==
Maren Larae Morris was born on April 10, 1990, in Arlington, Texas to Scott and Kellie Morris, who met at a bar in Dallas where they both worked. Morris was named after actress Maren Jensen, whose name Kellie came across while watching Battlestar Galactica. She has a sister, Karsen, who is 3 years younger. Morris's parents owned the Maren Karsen Aveda Hair Salon, and Morris spent much of her childhood at the salon. She later worked there as a front desk clerk and guest coordinator. In elementary school, she participated in the school choir, performed theater, and played soccer. In the early 1990s, her mother's uncle, who was gay, died of AIDS and Morris's parents' values of equality later led to her being a supporter of LGBTQ+ rights.

When Morris was around nine years old, at a party at her house for salon employees, she performed a karaoke version of "Blue" by LeAnn Rimes, who she idolized, at which time her parents discovered that she could sing. In September 2000, aged 11, one of Morris's first performances was at Johnnie High's, a country music talent show similar in style to the Grand Ole Opry. From that moment, Morris realized that "this [singing] is my calling". When she was 12, her father bought her an acoustic Ibanez guitar and taught her a few chords, which inspired her to start writing songs. She went to James Bowie High School in Arlington where she continued to play soccer, graduating in 2008. Her favorite classes were creative writing and art.

== Career ==
=== 2002–2015: Career beginnings in Texas, move to Nashville, and songwriting ===
Morris started touring her home state of Texas when she was 11 years old. Her father acted as her roadie, manager, and booking agent. Morris often performed in bars and clubs in Dallas and Fort Worth. She considered music to be her "weekend job". In 2005, Morris was one of several high school students from across the country selected to attend a Grammy Awards camp sponsored by the Grammy Foundation. She took her first plane trip alone to attend the camp, where she met David Foster, Paul Williams, and Jimmy Jam. That year, at the age of 15, Morris released her debut studio album titled Walk On, released on the independent Mozzi Bozzi label and containing ten tracks of mostly self written material. The record was financed by her parents who "literally sold the furniture out of the house" to pay for its recording and release, according to her mother. Smith Music released Morris's second studio album in 2007, titled All That It Takes, which also contained mostly self-composed tracks.

In her late teens, Morris auditioned for American Idol, America's Got Talent, The Voice, and Nashville Star and was rejected from each. Years later, Morris felt vindicated when her songs were used by contestants performing on American Idol. In 2010, Morris enrolled at the University of North Texas but left after one semester. Morris also joined a teen band called They Were Stars, with whom she played keyboards and provided harmony vocals. In 2011, the Mozzi Bozzi label released her third studio disc titled Live Wire.

Kacey Musgraves, whom Morris had met on the Texas music scene and lived in Nashville, encouraged Morris to also move to Nashville. After saving a few thousand dollars, in 2013, at 22 years old, Morris packed a U-Haul trailer and moved to Nashville. Morris spent her first year in Nashville networking and meeting other writers. She was introduced to Carla Wallace, co-owner of Big Yellow Dog Music, a music publisher. Impressed by her songwriting, Wallace signed her to a four-year songwriting contract with the company. She began co-writing material with other songwriters, and her material was soon recorded by several country artists. Tim McGraw recorded "Last Turn Home" for his 2014 album Sundown Heaven Town. During a writing session for the song, she met future husband Ryan Hurd. "Second Wind" was recorded by Kelly Clarkson for her 2015 album Piece by Piece. Some of her material was more personal, and Morris was encouraged by Wallace to start recording music herself. After listening to the demo recording of "My Church", which she wrote in March 2015, Morris realized she wanted to sing the song herself. It was also around this time that she met record producer Busbee, who produced the song.

=== 2016–2017: Breakthrough with Hero ===
Morris self-released five songs on eponymous extended play (EP), Maren Morris, via Spotify in August 2015. The songs gained 2.5 million streams on Spotify in a month, with three songs appearing on Spotify's US and Global "Viral 50" chart. The success of Morris's EP attracted the interest of major labels, and she was signed to Columbia Nashville, an imprint of Sony Music Nashville, in September. The label re-released the five-song EP in November, and "My Church" was issued as the lead single. The EP charted at number 22 on the US Top Country Albums chart and number one on the Top Heatseekers chart.

"My Church" peaked at number five on the US Hot Country Songs, number nine on the US Country Airplay, and number three on the Canada Country charts. In January 2018, Morris won Best Country Solo Performance for the song at the 60th Annual Grammy Awards. Her first Columbia Nashville album was released in June 2016, titled Hero. In the United States, it reached number five on the Billboard 200, and number one on the Top Country Albums chart. Joe Caramanica of The New York Times called Hero "both utterly of its moment and also savvy enough to indicate how the future might sound". Hero included three additional singles: "80's Mercedes", "I Could Use a Love Song" and "Rich". With the exception of "80's Mercedes", the singles reached the top ten of the Billboard country charts between 2016 and 2018.

Morris embarked on a tour, Ripcord World Tour, with Keith Urban in 2016. This was followed by the headlining Hero tour in 2017. A deluxe edition of Hero was released in March 2017, featuring three new recordings. She also provided vocals to Thomas Rhett's "Craving You", released in April 2017. Morris was also featured on Niall Horan's song "Seeing Blind", released in June 2018 and opened for Horan on his Flicker World Tour in 2018. In response to the 2017 Las Vegas shooting, Morris released "Dear Hate", a song she had written and recorded with Vince Gill, with all proceeds from the track going to the Music City Cares Fund. Morris earned Best New Artist accolade from the Country Music Association and several more Grammy nominations.

=== 2018–2019: Pop crossover, collaborations and continued country success ===
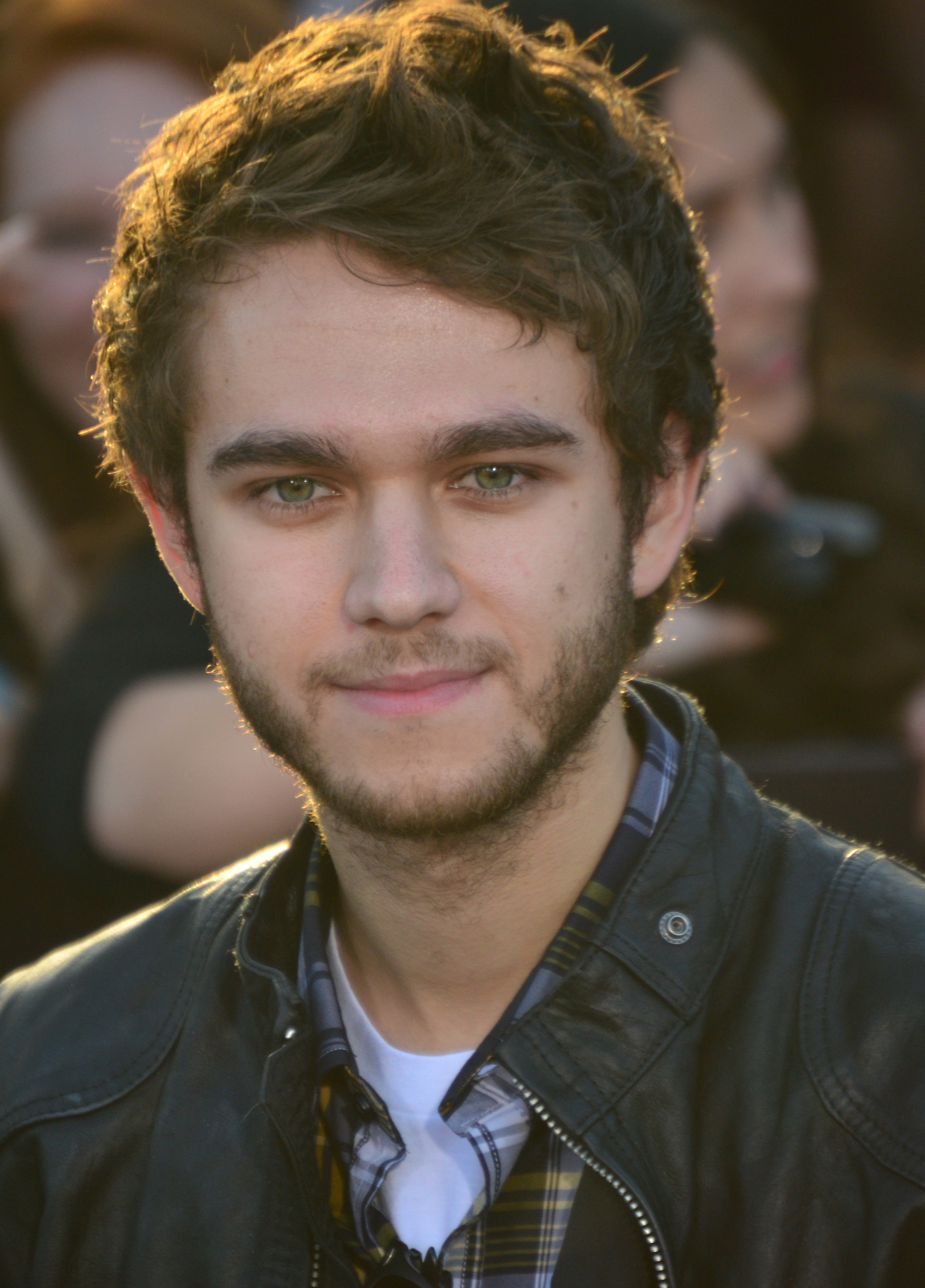
Maren Morris was a featured vocalist on Zedd's 2018 single "The Middle".

Morris was chosen by Zedd and Grey to provide the lead vocals for their pop single "The Middle", released in January 2018. The track became her breakout pop crossover single and expanded her audience. "The Middle" peaked at number five on the US Billboard Hot 100. Taylor Weatherby of Billboard commented that the song "may have drawn the roadmap for a reliable new path to crossover success." On October 5, 2018, Morris performed as a special guest during Taylor Swift's Reputation Stadium Tour in Arlington, Texas, performing "The Middle" with Swift.

Morris's next studio album Girl was released on March 8, 2019. According to Morris, the songs reflected her own experiences as a young woman while also highlighting the experiences of other women her age. Rolling Stone rated the album three and a half stars, calling it "where Morris makes her pop move". It topped the Billboard country albums chart and the reached the top five of the Billboard 200. She embarked on Girl: The World Tour in 2019. Its lead single of the same name reached the number one spot on the US Country Airplay chart and number eight on the US Country Songs chart. It was followed by the second single "The Bones", which topped both the Country Airplay and Country Songs charts in 2020. A duet version with Hozier became her second crossover pop hit, peaking at number 12 on the Hot 100 and number one on the adult contemporary chart. Girl won Album of the Year at the 2019 Country Music Association Awards.

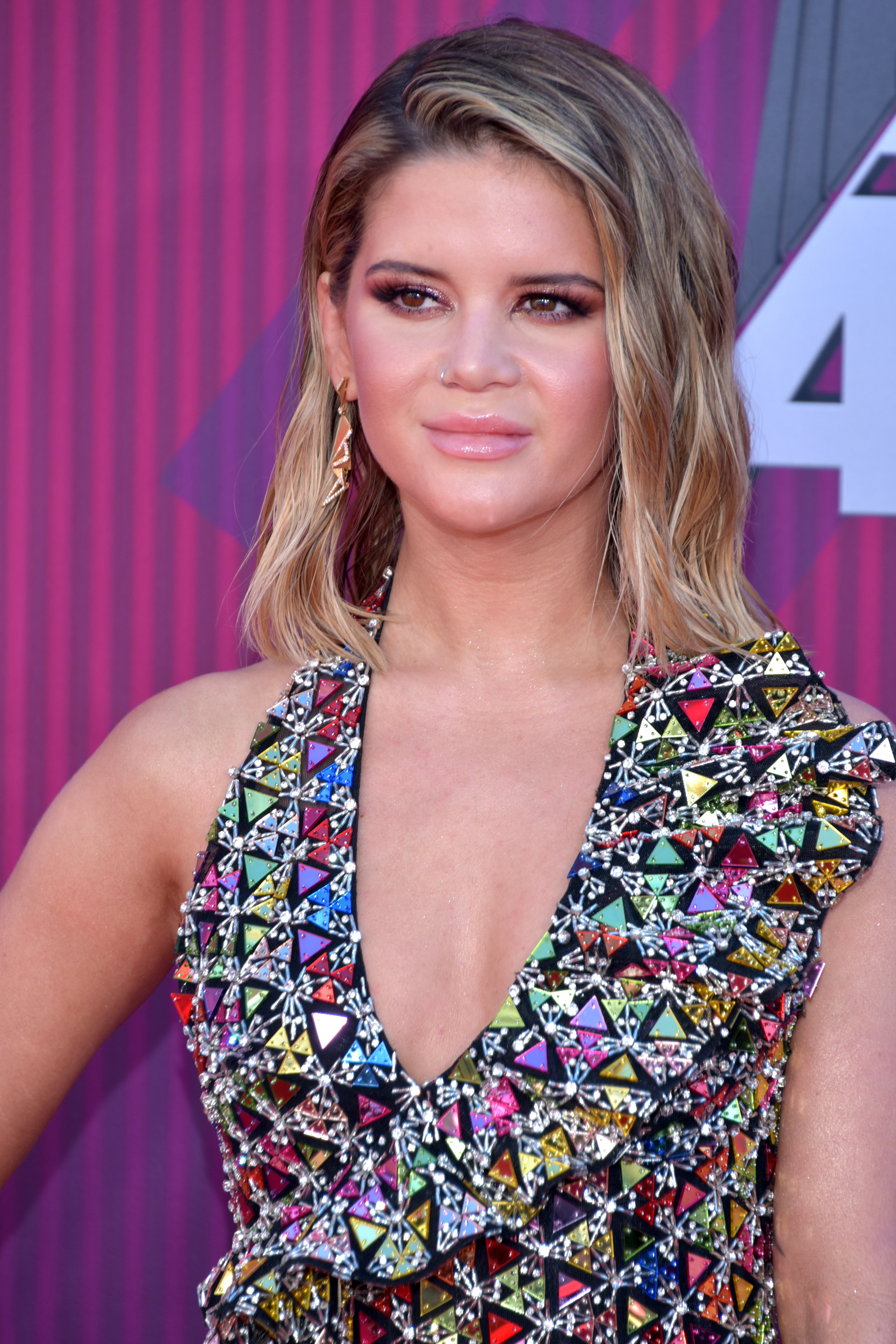
Morris in 2019

In March 2019, Morris formed a group with Brandi Carlile, Amanda Shires and Natalie Hemby called The Highwomen (in reference to The Highwaymen) and began recording with producer Dave Cobb. The Highwomen made their live debut in April 2019 at Loretta Lynn's 87th birthday concert performing "It Wasn't God Who Made Honky Tonk Angels". "Redesigning Women" was released in July 2019 as the first single from the group's self-titled debut album, The Highwomen, which was released in September 2019. The album had a top-ten debut on the US Billboard 200 and number one on the Country Chart. Busbee died in September 2019.

In 2020, Morris herself won Female Vocalist of the Year at the Country Music Association Awards and Female Artist of the Year at the Academy of Country Music Awards in both 2020 and 2021.

=== 2021–2023: Humble Quest and The Bridge ===
Morris collaborated with husband Ryan Hurd on the single "Chasing After You", released in February 2021. The song reached the top five on the Billboard country charts. She was the featured guest vocalist on John Mayer's single "Last Train Home", released in June 2021, and appeared on "Why You No Love Me" and "Shot In The Dark" on his album Sob Rock, released in July 2021. In January 2022, Morris released "Circles Around This Town". It was followed by the release of her next studio album Humble Quest in March 2022, produced by Greg Kurstin. GQ magazine described its sound as a "return from glittery pop to her stripped-down country origins". Humble Quest debuted at number two on the Billboard country albums chart and number 21 on the Billboard 200. Morris also embarked on its accompanying tour, titled Humble Quest Tour, which began on March 8 at Houston Rodeo and concluded on December 2 at Bridgestone Arena.

Morris reunited with Zedd for their second collaboration, titled "Make You Say", alongside Beauz, released in August 2022. In September 2023, she announced her departure from the country music industry. She told the Los Angeles Times that the reason for her decision is because she has "said everything" she has wanted to say. That month, Columbia released an extended play titled The Bridge. The EP contains the tracks "The Tree" and "Get the Hell Out of Here". Greg Kurstin and Jack Antonoff alternated as producers on these songs.

=== 2024–present: The Wild Robot and Dreamsicle ===
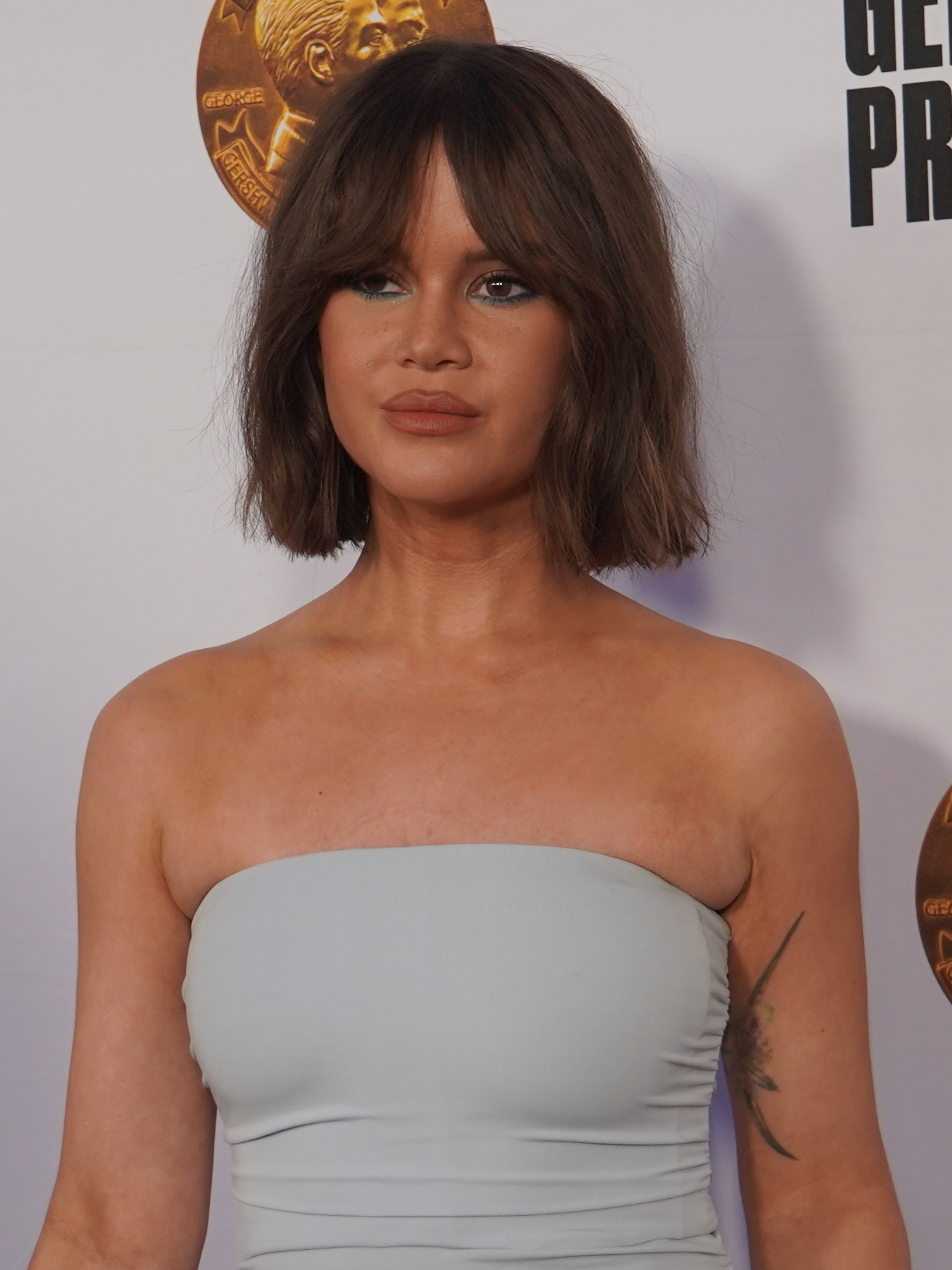
Morris in 2024

In February 2024, Morris released her version of Billy Idol's 1981 single "Dancing with Myself", a partnership with the mobile app Visible for their Singles Awareness Day campaign. To celebrate the fifth anniversary of Girl, she performed the RSVP Redux Tour from May 29 to June 11. Featuring Betty Who as a supporting act, the tour included shows beginning at San Francisco on May 29 and concluding at Sandpoint on July 31. In August, she performed her 2020 song "Better Than We Found It" at the 2024 Democratic National Convention in Chicago. That month, her soundtrack single "Kiss the Sky" was released; it was included in the DreamWorks Animation film The Wild Robot (2024), along with her song "Even When I'm Not". "Kiss the Sky" was met with critical acclaim, earning Morris her first nominations at the Golden Globe Awards, Critics Choice Awards, Satellite Awards, and among others. It was also short listed for Best Original Song at the 97th Academy Awards, though it was ultimately not nominated. Her fifth EP, Intermission, was also released, which features five new tracks including a collaboration single with Julia Michaels, "Cut!". In October, she issued a single "People Still Show Up", stating that she "just wanted to put out something vibey and fun". In November, Billboard named Morris the 99th Greatest Country Artist of All-Time.

In January 2025, Morris released her second collaboration with Michaels, titled "Scissors". Four months later, her fourth studio album, Dreamsicle, was released; it contains all five tracks from Intermission, including the singles "People Still Show Up", "Carry Me Through", and "Bed No Breakfast". Following the release of the album, Billboard's Andrew Unterberger characterized Morris as pursuing "a full pop reinvention", highlighting her earlier crossover success with "The Middle" and "The Bones" while questioning whether she would achieve the same level of mainstream pop stardom with her new direction. She performed the Dreamsicle World Tour from November 3 to 20 across the United Kingdom and Europe.

== Artistry ==
Morris's music is primarily country and country pop with elements of pop, R&B, hip-hop, and rock. Writers and critics commented that Morris's first two Columbia albums combined country with R&B and hip hop musical styles. Stephen Thomas Erlewine of AllMusic found that Hero included "R&B influences" that "twists the rhymes" and "[rides] the beat" while "undercutting her boasts with sly wit". Jewly Hight of Billboard described Hero as "a signifier of country-pop's fluidity and a creative process that resembles the track-building of pop, R&B and hip-hop." The Hartford Courant praised Girl for incorporating similar styles: "If a lot of male country singers dabble with hip-hop in ways that sometimes feel stilted, Morris brings straight-up elements of '90s R&B to the album on songs like the bedroom-centric 'RSVP'."

When reviewing Girl, Jon Caramanica described her voice as "versatile" in the way it can move between both the country and pop genres. In 2019, Chris Richards of The Washington Post described Morris as having "the best voice of any country singer working today". Richards further explained, "Listen to her jump in and out of her lyrics and you'll hear a sophistication that feels like something metaphysical."

In an interview with NPR in 2022, Morris was asked about whether she still identified with the country music genre and responded: "even though I live in Nashville and I'm from Texas and I feel like my songwriting at its core is country, I think you can hear a lot of different influences when you've heard any of my records." Other writers have agreed, including Erlewine: "Morris's music was grounded in country -- prior to striking gold as a performer, she was a professional songwriter in Nashville -- but she also incorporated elements of pop, R&B, hip-hop, and rock, creating a distinctive, stylish hybrid that had wide appeal outside her chosen genre."

Morris has cited various artists of different genres as influences on her career, including Katy Perry, Coldplay, Linda Ronstadt, Dolly Parton, Taylor Swift, Chaka Khan, and Hank Williams.

== Advocacy ==
In March 2026, Morris was among a group of celebrities who signed an open letter demanding the "immediate closure" of the Dilley Immigration Processing Center in Texas.

=== Issues with the country music industry ===
Morris has been an advocate for making the country genre more equitable for fellow artists. She has commented on the inequalities particularly between white and black artists in the genre. In her 2020 Country Music Association Awards acceptance speech, Morris named several black artists who helped make the award possible including Mickey Guyton, Linda Martell, and Brittney Spencer. In early 2021, Morris spoke out against country artist Morgan Wallen when a video surfaced of him using the N-word, a racial slur. Morris said that she and her son received death threats after her comments on the incident.

In August 2022, Morris and other country music singers including Cassadee Pope criticized Brittany Aldean, wife of singer Jason Aldean, as transphobic after Aldean published an Instagram in which she said "I'd really like to thank my parents for not changing my gender when I went through my tomboy phase". Morris referred to Aldean as "Insurrection Barbie" and a "Karen". Tucker Carlson referred to Morris as a "lunatic country music person" on Fox News Channel; in response, Morris sold T-shirts through her website featuring the phrase "lunatic country music person" and the telephone number of the Trans Lifeline, with proceeds from sales of the shirts donated to GLAAD. In September, she partnered with GLAAD to design a new T-shirt in honor of Spirit Day. In October, Jason Aldean mentioned Morris at his concert in Nashville, and waited as his crowd booed Morris's name. In November, Morris only briefly attended the Country Music Association Awards despite being nominated, saying that she did not feel comfortable going.

Morris told Los Angeles Times in September 2023, that she planned to leave the country music industry. She cited the country music industry's unwillingness to reckon with issues of misogyny and racism, as well as its reluctance to support artists from minority groups, as her reasons for doing so. Lee Greenwood criticized Morris for insulting country music and patriotism, saying that country music is by definition about patriotism.

=== Fundraising ===
In 2017, Morris started the Heroes Fund, which raises money for music education in public schools. Through the program, which was funded by fees paid by fans for "meet and greet" events at her concerts, Morris donated $70,000 to the music and drama departments of East Nashville Magnet High School. In August, Morris joined several country artists for a concert that raised $450,000 for Together: Feeding Nashville to address food security in the Nashville area.

In April 2021, during the COVID-19 pandemic, Morris was one of several artists that performed at a virtual fundraiser at which Shein donated $300,000 to the NAACP Legal Defense and Educational Fund, Together We Rise, and Ecologi. In September 2022, Morris raised over $100,000 for transgender rights after Tucker Carlson called her a "lunatic country music person" on his show.

=== Recognition for activism ===
Morris's actions to distance herself from the country music industry were described as "powerful" by an opinion piece in CNN. Joe Coscarelli of The New York Times described her as a "risk-taker", while Out depicted her as a "groundbreaker" and "innovator". She was named the Changemaker of the Year in 2023 by Variety, and to the 2024 Women in Music Visionary list by Billboard. In May 2023, GLAAD awarded Morris with its Excellence in Media Award for promoting acceptance of the LGBTQ community within the country music genre throughout her career.

Artists that have supported or spoken highly about Morris's activism include: The Chicks, Laura Veltz, Joy Oladokun, Meghan Linsey, Victoria Shaw, Brothers Osborne, Brittney Spencer, Jessie Murph, Carly Pearce, Niall Horan, Keith Urban, Hozier, Lady A, Sam Hunt, Kelsea Ballerini, Jason Isbell, Brandi Carlile, Zedd, Vince Gill, Elton John, and Taylor Swift.

== Personal life ==
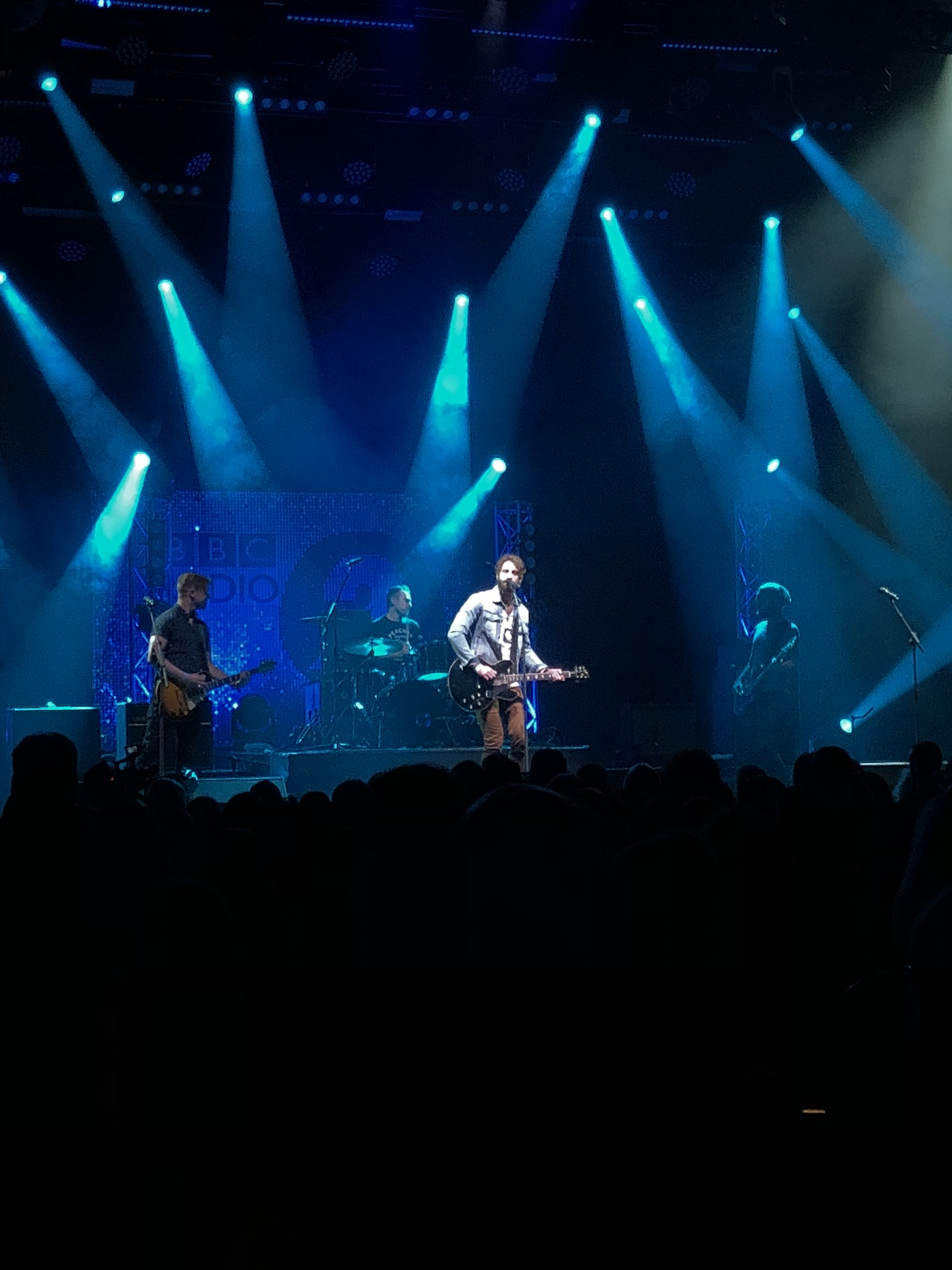
Ryan Hurd, Morris's ex-husband, performing at C2C (Country to Country) in the UK, March 2018

Morris met fellow country singer-songwriter Ryan Hurd while co-writing "Last Turn Home" for Tim McGraw. In December 2015, the pair began dating; they announced their engagement in July 2017. They got married on March 24, 2018, in Nashville. Their son was born in March 2020. Morris experienced some health issues during childbirth, requiring an emergency C-section. After the birth of her son, she was diagnosed with postpartum depression. She filed for divorce in October 2023; a divorce settlement was reached in January 2024. She lives 5 minutes away from her ex-husband and they still meet for dinner regularly.

Morris came out as bisexual on June 9, 2024, saying that it was her greatest accomplishment of that year. She then began dating women. In July 2026, reports emerged that she and fellow singer Cassadee Pope had appeared to publicly confirm a romantic relationship after sharing affectionate posts on social media.

== Discography ==
- Hero (2016)
- Girl (2019)
- Humble Quest (2022)
- Dreamsicle (2025)

== Filmography ==
List of film and television appearances
Title	Year	Role	Notes	Ref.
CMT Crossroads	2016, 2023	Herself	Episode: "Maren Morris & Alicia Keys" on December 2 Episode: "Maren Morris & Hozier" on September 22	
NCIS: New Orleans	2017	Herself	Episode: "Pandora's Box, Part II"	
Sesame Street	2020	Herself	Episode: "Last Draw"	
Jimmy Kimmel Live!	2021	Guest host	Guest host for two episodes	
RuPaul's Drag Race	2023	Guest judge	Episode: "All Queens Go to Heaven"	
RuPaul's Drag Race: Untucked	2023	Herself	Episode: "Untucked - All Queens Go To Heaven"	
The Late Show with Stephen Colbert	2024	Herself	Episode: April 9, 2024, Stephen and Maren sing The National Anthem	
Sheriff Country	2026	Hazel	Episode: "Compromised"	
Dancing with the Stars	2026	Herself	Season 35; guest performer	

== Bibliography ==
- Addie Ant Goes On an Adventure (2024)
- Beatrix Butterfly Wings It for Once (2025)

== Achievements ==
Morris has won a series of awards for her work as a music artist. It includes five accolades from the Academy of Country Music, five from the Country Music Association, and one from the Grammy Awards.

In 2018, Forbes listed Morris in their 30 Under 30 list. She was also included on the Billboard Decade-End of the top 50 most successful Country Artists of the 2010s.

== Tours ==
=== Headlining ===
- The Hero Tour (2017)
- Girl: The World Tour (2019)
- Humble Quest Tour (2022)
- RSVP Redux Tour (2024)
- The Dreamsicle World Tour (2025–2026)

=== Opening act ===
- Ripcord World Tour (2016) (with Keith Urban)
- 15 in a 30 Tour (2017) (with Sam Hunt)
- Flicker World Tour (2018) (with Niall Horan)
- Roadside Bars & Pink Guitars Tour (2019) (with Miranda Lambert)
- The Chicks Tour (2023) (with the Chicks)
- 2024 North American Summer Tour (2024) (with Maroon 5)

== See also ==
- LGBTQ representation in country music
