= Maren Morris discography =

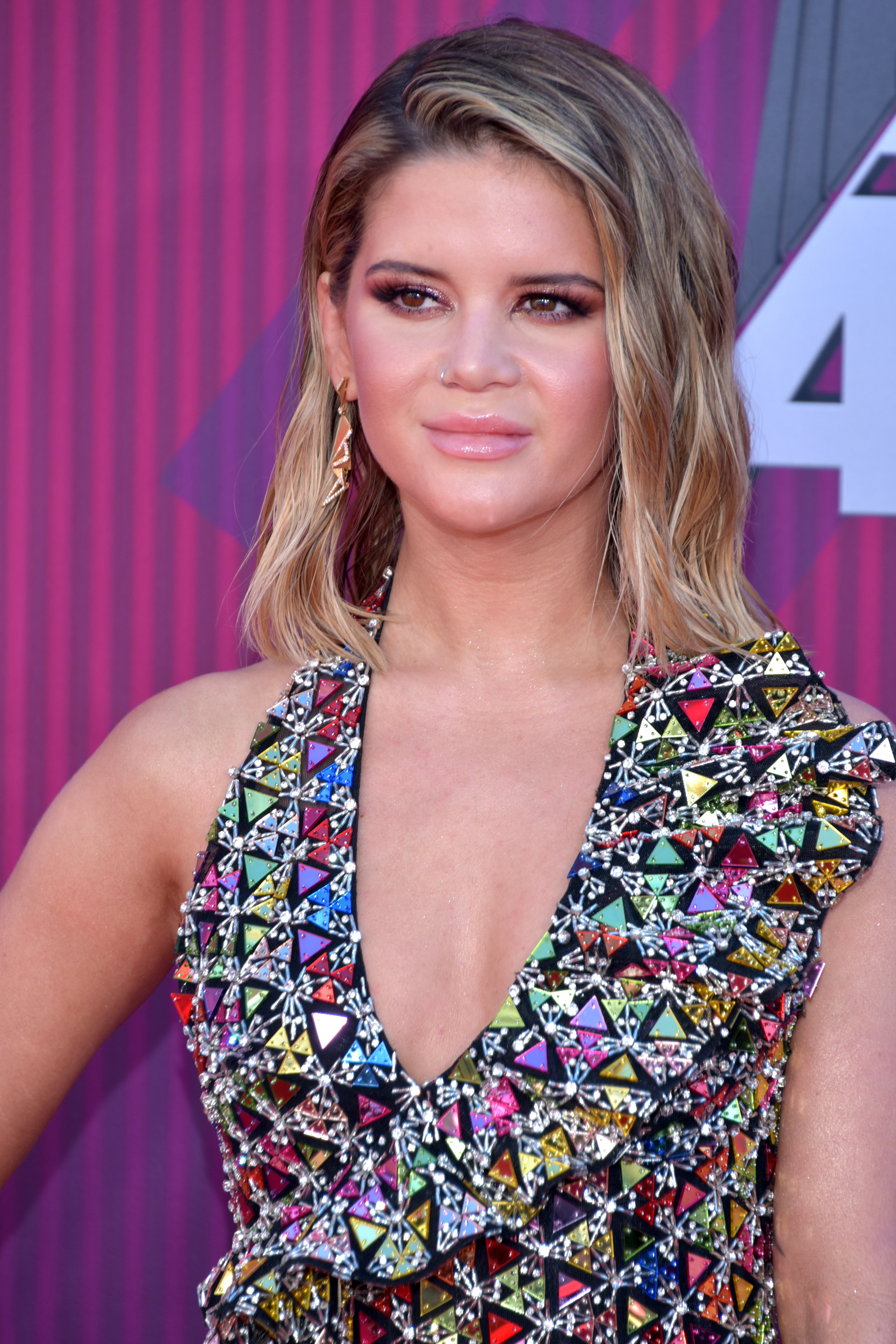
- Morris at the 2019 iHeartRadio Music Awards
- Studio albums: 7
- EPs: 5
- Singles: 30
- Music videos: 28
- Promotional singles: 10
- Other charted songs: 9
- Album appearances: 7

American singer-songwriter Maren Morris has released seven studio albums, five extended plays (EPs), thirty singles, ten promotional singles, twenty-eight music videos and has appeared on seven albums. Her first three studio offerings were issued on independent labels, beginning with 2005's Walk On. It was followed by If That's All It Takes (2007) and Live Wire (2011).

In 2016, Morris's song "My Church" was her first to reach the top ten of the North American country singles charts. It prompted a recording contract from Columbia Nashville, which resulted in her first major label album titled Hero (2016). The disc reached the top five of the Billboard 200 and topped the Billboard country albums charts. The album spawned three more singles including the top ten songs "I Could Use a Love Song" and "Rich".

In 2018, Morris collaborated with Zedd and Grey on a track called "The Middle". The song became a top ten pop single internationally. She followed with 2019's Girl. The album also topped the Billboard country chart and reached the Billboard 200 top five. Its title track and "The Bones" both became number one country songs.

In 2021, Morris joined Ryan Hurd on the duet "Chasing After You". She previously teamed with Thomas Rhett, Niall Horan and Sheryl Crow for collaborative single releases. In 2022, Morris released the single "Circles Around This Town" which reached the top ten of the North American country charts. It was included on her sixth studio effort titled Humble Quest. Released in March 2022, Humble Quest peaked at number two on the Billboard country albums chart and number 21 on the Billboard 200.

== Studio albums ==
List of albums, with selected chart positions and certifications, showing other relevant details
Title	Album details	Peak chart positions						Certifications
Title	Album details	US	US Cou.	AUS	CAN	SCO	UK	Certifications
Walk On	Released: June 14, 2005; Label: Mozzi Bozzi; Formats: CD	—	—	—	—	—	—	
All That It Takes	Released: October 22, 2007; Label: Mozzi Bozzi/Smith; Formats: CD	—	—	—	—	—	—	
Live Wire	Released: 2011; Label: Mozzi Bozzi; Formats: CD	—	—	—	—	—	—	
Hero	Released: June 3, 2016; Label: Columbia Nashville; Formats: CD, LP, music download	5	1	69	14	36	65	RIAA: Platinum; MC: Gold
Girl	Released: March 8, 2019; Label: Columbia Nashville; Formats: CD, LP, music download	4	1	29	14	22	72	RIAA: Gold; MC: Platinum; RMNZ: Gold
Humble Quest	Released: March 25, 2022; Label: Columbia Nashville; Formats: CD, LP, music download	21	2	—	60	28	—	
Dreamsicle	Released: May 9, 2025; Label: Columbia; Formats: CD, LP, music download	— (Note: Dreamsicle did not enter the Billboard 200, but peaked at number 28 on the Billboard Top Album Sales chart.)	—	—	—	18	— (Note: Dreamsicle did not enter the Official UK Albums Chart, but peaked at number 26 on the UK Official Albums Sales Chart.)	
"—" denotes a recording that did not chart or was not released in that territory.

== Extended plays ==
List of EPs, with selected chart positions, showing other relevant details
Title	Album details	Peak chart positions		
Title	Album details	US	US Cou.	US Heat
Maren Morris	Released: August 2015; Label: Columbia Nashville; Formats: CD, music download	96	22	1
Maren Morris: Reimagined	Released: May 31, 2019; Label: Columbia Nashville; Formats: Music download	—	—	—
Maren Morris Live from Chicago	Released: May 8, 2020; Label: Columbia Nashville; Formats: Music download	—	—	—
The Bridge	Released: September 15, 2023; Label: Columbia; Formats: Music download	—	—	—
Intermission	Released: August 2, 2024; Label: Columbia; Formats: Music download	—	—	—
"—" denotes a recording that did not chart or was not released in that territory.

== Singles ==
=== As lead artist ===
List of singles as lead artist, with selected chart positions and certifications, showing other relevant details
Title	Year	Peak chart positions										Certifications	Album
Title	Year	US	US Cou. Songs	US Cou. Air.	AUS	CAN	CAN Cou.	IRE	NZ	SCO	UK	Certifications	Album
"My Church"	2016	50	5	9	—	64	3	—	—	43	— (Note: "My Church" did not enter the Official UK Top 100 Chart, but peaked at number 70 on both the Official Singles Downloads Chart Top 100 and in the Official Singles Sales Chart Top 100)	RIAA: 2× Platinum; BPI: Silver; MC: 2× Platinum; RMNZ: Gold	Hero
"80s Mercedes"	2016	74	11	12	—	—	17	—	—	—	—	RIAA: Platinum; MC: Platinum	Hero
"I Could Use a Love Song"	2017	56	7	1	—	—	14	—	—	—	—	RIAA: Platinum; MC: Platinum	Hero
"The Middle" (with Zedd and Grey)	2018	5	—	—	7	6	—	7	8	8	7	RIAA: 6× Platinum; ARIA: 10× Platinum; BPI: 2× Platinum; MC: 9× Platinum; RMNZ: 5× Platinum	Non-album single
"Rich"	2018	62	8	4	—	—	2	—	—	—	—	RIAA: Platinum; MC: Gold	Hero
"Seeing Blind" (with Niall Horan)	2018	—	—	—	—	—	—	68	—	—	—	ARIA: Gold; RMNZ: Gold	Flicker
"Girl"	2019	44	8	1	—	84	5	—	—	—	—	RIAA: Platinum; MC: 2× Platinum	Girl
"The Bones" (solo or with Hozier)	2019	12	1	1	—	45	1	63	— (Note: "The Bones" did not enter the NZ Top 40 Singles Chart, but peaked at number 24 on the NZ Hot Singles Chart.)	—	—	RIAA: 4× Platinum; ARIA: Gold; BPI: Gold; MC: 7× Platinum; RMNZ: 2× Platinum	Girl
"To Hell & Back"	2020	—	35	32	—	—	48	—	—	—	—		Girl
"Chasing After You" (with Ryan Hurd)	2021	23	3	2	—	61	5	—	—	—	—	RIAA: 2× Platinum	Pelago
"Bigger Man" (with Joy Oladokun)	2021	—	—	—	—	—	—	—	—	—	—		In Defense of My Own Happiness
"Circles Around This Town"	2022	52	9	9	—	76	7	—	— (Note: "Circles Around This Town" did not enter the NZ Top 40 Singles Chart, but peaked at number 30 on the NZ Hot Singles Chart.)	—	—	RIAA: Gold; MC: Gold	Humble Quest
"Make You Say" (with Zedd and Beauz)	2022	— (Note: "Make You Say" did not enter the Billboard Hot 100, but peaked at number 20 on the Bubbling Under Hot 100 extension chart.)	—	—	—	—	—	—	— (Note: "Make You Say" did not enter the NZ Top 40 Singles Chart, but peaked at number 25 on the NZ Hot Singles Chart.)	—	—		Non-album single
"I Can't Love You Anymore"	2022	—	—	53	—	—	—	—	—	—	—		Humble Quest
"42" (with Diplo)	2023	— (Note: "42" did not enter the Billboard Hot 100, but peaked at number 14 on the Hot Dance/Electronic Songs chart.)	—	—	—	—	—	—	—	—	—		Non-album singles
"Dancing with Myself"	2024	—	—	—	—	—	—	—	—	—	—		Non-album singles
"Cut!" (featuring Julia Michaels)	2024	—	—	—	—	—	—	—	— (Note: "Cut!" did not enter the NZ Top 40 Singles Chart, but peaked at number 15 on the NZ Hot Singles Chart.)	—	—		Intermission (Note: Those songs were later included in Dreamsicle.)
"I Hope I Never Fall in Love"	2024	—	—	—	—	—	—	—	—	—	—		Intermission
"Kiss the Sky"	2024	—	—	—	—	—	—	—	—	—	—		The Wild Robot (Original Motion Picture Soundtrack)
"People Still Show Up"	2024	—	—	—	—	—	—	—	—	—	—		Non-album single (Note: The track was later included in Dreamsicle.)
"Scissors" (with Julia Michaels)	2025	—	—	—	—	—	—	—	— (Note: "Scissors" did not enter the NZ Top 40 Singles Chart, but peaked at number 39 on the NZ Hot Singles Chart.)	—	—		Second Self
"Carry Me Through"	2025	—	—	—	—	—	—	—	—	—	—		Dreamsicle
"Bed No Breakfast"	2025	—	—	—	—	—	—	—	—	—	—		Dreamsicle
"Welcome to the End"	2025	—	—	—	—	—	—	—	—	—	—		Non album single
"Be a Bitch"	2025	—	—	—	—	—	—	—	—	—	—		Dreamsicle (Deluxe)
"Beat the Devil"	2025	—	—	—	—	—	—	—	—	—	—		Sheriff Country
"Parachute"	2026	—	—	—	—	—	—	—	—	—	—		Sheriff Country
"Goodbye to You" (with Michelle Branch)	2026	—	—	—	—	—	—	—	—	—	—		Everywhere and Back Again (EP)
"—" denotes a recording that did not chart or was not released in that territory.

=== As featured artist ===
List of singles as featured artist, with selected chart positions and certifications, showing other relevant details
Title	Year	Peak chart positions					Certifications	Album
Title	Year	US	US Cou. Songs	US Cou. Air.	CAN	CAN Cou.	Certifications	Album
"Craving You" (Thomas Rhett featuring Maren Morris)	2017	39	3	1	61	1	RIAA: 3× Platinum; ARIA: Gold	Life Changes
"Prove You Wrong" (Sheryl Crow featuring Stevie Nicks and Maren Morris)	2019	—	—	33	—	—		Threads
"Line by Line" (JP Saxe featuring Maren Morris)	2021	—	—	—	96	—	MC: Gold	Dangerous Levels of Introspection
"Texas" (Jessie Murph featuring Maren Morris)	2023	—	48	—	—	—	MC: Gold	Non-album single
"Some Things I'll Never Know" (Teddy Swims featuring Maren Morris)	2023	—	—	—	—	—	BPI: Silver; MC: Platinum; RMNZ: Gold	I've Tried Everything but Therapy (Part 1)
"Highway Queen" (Mt. Joy featuring Maren Morris)	2024	—	—	—	—	—		Hope We Have Fun
"—" denotes a recording that did not chart or was not released in that territory.

=== Promotional singles ===
List of promotional singles, with selected chart positions, showing other relevant details
Title	Year	Peak chart positions						Album
Title	Year	US	US Cou. Songs	US Cou. Air.	US Dig. Sales	CAN	CAN Cou.	Album
"Dear Hate" (featuring Vince Gill)	2017	91	18	29	13	—	39	Non-album promotional single
"Common" (featuring Brandi Carlile)	2019	—	47	—	—	—	—	Girl
"Kingdom of One"	2019	—	—	—	—	—	—	For the Throne: Music Inspired by the HBO Series Game of Thrones
"Just for Now"	2020	—	40	—	—	—	—	Girl
"Better Than We Found It"	2020	—	40	—	39	—	—	Non-album promotional single
"You All Over Me" (Taylor Swift featuring Maren Morris) (Note: Alternate versions of the title include "You All Over Me (from the Vault)" and "You All Over Me (Taylor's Version) (From the Vault)".)	2021	51	6	—	5	29	—	Fearless (Taylor's Version)
"Background Music"	2022	—	—	—	—	—	—	Humble Quest
"Nervous"	2022	—	32	—	—	—	—	Humble Quest
"—" denotes a recording that did not chart or was not released in that territory.

== Other charted songs ==
List of singles, with selected chart positions, showing other relevant details
Title	Year	Peak chart positions		Certifications	Album
Title	Year	US	US Cou. Songs	Certifications	Album
"I'll Be the Moon" (Dierks Bentley featuring Maren Morris)	2016	—	40		Black
"Once"	2017	—	37		Hero
"When You Believe" (Pentatonix featuring Maren Morris)	2018	— (Note: "When You Believe" did not enter the Billboard Hot 100, but peaked at number 25 on the Bubbling Under Hot 100 extension chart.)	—		Christmas Is Here!
"A Song for Everything"	2019	—	37		Girl
"All My Favorite People" (featuring Brothers Osborne)	2019	—	46	MC: Gold	Girl
"Way Too Pretty for Prison" (Miranda Lambert featuring Maren Morris)	2019	— (Note: "Way Too Pretty for Prison" did not enter the Billboard Hot 100, but peaked at number 46 on the Hot Digital Songs component chart.)	—		Wildcard
"Fooled Around and Fell in Love" (Miranda Lambert featuring Maren Morris, Ashley McBryde, Tenille Townes, Caylee Hammack, and Elle King)	2019	— (Note: "Fooled Around and Fell in Love" did not enter the Billboard Hot 100, but peaked at number 25 on the Hot Digital Songs component chart.)	47		—N/a
"—" denotes a recording that did not chart or was not released in that territory.

== Other album appearances ==
List of non-single guest appearances, with other performing artists, showing year released and album name
Title	Year	Other artist(s)	Album	Ref.
"Wild Frontier"	2016	—N/a	2016 Nominees: Original Songwriter Demos	
"Mona Lisas and Mad Hatters"	2018	—N/a	Restoration: Reimagining the Songs of Elton John and Bernie Taupin	
"The Bones"	2020	Hozier	One World: Together at Home	
"I Save Me"	2021	Diane Warren	The Cave Sessions, Vol. 1	
"Empty Cups"	2022	Amanda Shires	Take It Like a Man	
"Even When I'm Not"	2024	—N/a	The Wild Robot (Original Motion Picture Soundtrack)	

== Music videos ==
List of music videos, showing year released and director
Title	Year	Director(s)	Ref.
"My Church"	2016	Rachel McDonald	
"80s Mercedes"	2016	Alon Isocianu	
"Once" (Live from RCA)	2016	Justin Key	
"Craving You" (with Thomas Rhett)	2017	TK McKamy	
"I Could Use a Love Song"	2017	Alon Isocianu	
"The Middle" (with Zedd and Grey)	2018	Dave Meyers	
"Rich"	2018	Ken Fox	
"Girl"	2019	Jim Shea	
"The Bones"	2019	Alex Ferrari	
"Better Than We Found It"	2020	Gabrielle Woodland	
"Line by Line" (with JP Saxe)	2021	Nick Leopold	
"Chasing After You" (with Ryan Hurd)	2021	TK McKamy	
"Circles Around This Town"	2022	Harper Smith	
"Make You Say" (with Zedd and Beauz)	2022	Colin Read	
"The Tree"	2023	Jason Lester	
"Get the Hell Out of Here"	2023	Jason Lester	
"Texas" (with Jessie Murph)	2023	Nicki Fletcher & Mason Allen	
"Dancing With Myself"	2024	Mehdi Zollo	
"Kiss the Sky"	2024	Chris Sanders	
"Scissors" (with Julia Michaels)	2025	Blythe Thomas	
"Carry Me Through"	2025	Alexa King Stone & Stephen Kinigopoulos	
"Bed No Breakfast"	2025	Blythe Thomas	
"Too Good"	2025	Blythe Thomas	
"Holy Smoke"	2025	Unknown	
"Dreamsicle"	2025	Blythe Thomas	
"Grand Bouquet"	2025	Unknown	
"Lemonade"	2025	Blythe Thomas	
"Cry in the Car"	2025	Blythe Thomas	
"Goodbye to You" (with Michelle Branch)	2026	Jason Lester	
