= Maren Morris Live from Chicago =

EP and live album by Maren Morris
- Released: May 8, 2020
- Recorded: March 9, 2019
- Venue: Riviera Theatre (Chicago, Illinois)
- Label: Sony Nashville

Maren Morris chronology
Maren Morris: Reimagined (2019)	Maren Morris Live from Chicago (2020)	Humble Quest (2022)

Maren Morris Live from Chicago is third extended play (EP) by American singer and songwriter Maren Morris. It was released on May 8, 2020, via Sony Music Nashville. Recorded during the opening night of the Girl: The World Tour, the EP captures live performances from Morris's March 9, 2019, concert at the Riviera Theatre in Chicago.

Released after the tour was interrupted by the COVID-19 pandemic, Maren Morris Live from Chicago was intended to give fans a live concert experience while in-person performances were suspended. It features four songs from her second studio album, Girl (2019), including the singles "Girl" and "The Bones".

== Background ==
Morris first garnered commercial success with her 2016 single "My Church", which became a top ten country song. In the singles and albums that followed, she mixed country music with pop, R&B and rock that helped bring crossover success to her career. In 2019, her second studio album was released, titled Girl, and was followed by a corresponding world tour.

The material included on Maren Morris Live from Chicago was taken from the opening night of her world tour. Recorded at the Riviera Theatre in Chicago, Illinois on March 9, 2019, the project was chosen to be released as an alternative to her concerts being cancelled due to the COVID-19 pandemic. Morris wrote in a statement: "Feeling so nostalgic for shows lately so here's a few tracks from opening night of GIRL: The World Tour."

== Release ==
A total of four tracks (all recorded live) comprised the extended play. It included the title track from Girl and Morris's crossover pop single "The Bones". It also featured two additional tracks that were first included on Girl: "Common" and "A Song for Everything". The EP was livestreamed globally through Amazon Music's Facebook page on March 9, 2019, and it was released through Sony Music Nashville on May 8, 2020.

== Track listing ==
Maren Morris Live from Chicago track listing
No.	Title	Length
1.	"Girl"	4:13
2.	"A Song for Everything"	3:18
3.	"Common"	4:08
4.	"The Bones"	3:24

== Release history ==
Release history and formats
Region	Date	Format	Label	Ref.
North America	May 8, 2020	Digital download	Sony Music Nashville	
