= Maren Morris: Reimagined =

- Apple Music exclusive cover

EP (re-recording) by Maren Morris
- Released: May 31, 2019
- Studio: RCA Studio A (Nashville, Tennessee)
- Genre: Acoustic; country
- Length: 10:47
- Label: Sony
- Producer: Dave Cobb

Maren Morris chronology
Girl (2019)	Maren Morris: Reimagined (2019)	Maren Morris Live from Chicago (2020)

Alternative cover
- 2020 cover (Note: The EP became available in all streaming platforms in 2020, using a different cover art.)

Maren Morris: Reimagined is the second extended play (EP) by American artist Maren Morris. It was released on May 31, 2019, through Sony Music Entertainment. The EP consists of three tracks which were produced by Dave Cobb. The project was a re–working of Morris's most popular singles cut in an acoustic style. It premiered exclusively through Apple Music with an accompanying video that highlighted the recording process.

== Background and content ==
Morris reached her breakthrough with songs that were grounded in the genre of country music, but also fused elements of R&B, pop and rock. The balance helped bring Morris crossover success with songs like "The Middle" and "The Bones". She collaborated in 2019 with producer Dave Cobb to remake her material in an acoustic fashion. "I think the mark of a good song is you can rearrange it up and it still is a very defining song. Dave you know, his production is so rootsy and very soulful and Americana and he just understands that sound so intensely," she explained. Maren Morris: Reimagined was recorded in Nashville, Tennessee at RCA Studio B.

Maren Morris: Reimagined contained a total of three songs. All three songs were previously re–recorded and had been commercially–successful singles for Morris in her career: "Girl", "The Bones" and "The Middle". Taste of Country described the tracks in detail in their description of the EP: "'Girl' is infused with a more roots sound, while 'The Middle' still has a pop vibe as the melody is created with piano, bass and a cajon beatbox. The integrity of 'The Bones' remains intact, with acoustic guitar accompanying Morris as she soulfully sings the lyrics." The EP was released through Apple Music on May 31, 2019. It was issued via Sony Music Nashville with a companion video. The film showed clips of the recording process, with excerpts of Cobb and Morris in the studio.

== Track listing ==
Maren Morris: Reimagined track listing
No.	Title	Length
1.	"Girl" (acoustic)	3:52
2.	"The Middle" (acoustic)	3:18
3.	"The Bones"	3:37

Maren Morris: Reimagined Video extra
No.	Title	Length
1.	"Maren Morris: Reimagined"	10:00

== Release history ==
List of release dates and formats
Region	Date	Format	Label	Ref.
North America	May 31, 2019	Digital download; streaming	Sony Music Nashville	
