= Better Than We Found It =

Promotional single by Maren Morris
- Released: October 2, 2020
- Length: 3:17
- Label: Sony
- Songwriters: Jessie Jo Dillon; Jimmy Robbins; Laura Veltz; Maren Morris
- Producer: Greg Kurstin

Maren Morris promotional singles chronology
| "Just for Now" (2020) | "Better Than We Found It" (2020) | "You All Over Me" (2021) |

Music video
- "Better Than We Found It" on YouTube

"Better Than We Found It" is a song by American singer Maren Morris. It was released on October 2, 2020, as a promotional single. Written by Morris, Jessie Jo Dillon, Jimmy Robbins, and Laura Veltz, while produced by Greg Kurstin, the song was inspired by the Black Lives Matter movement and serves as a "protest song" addressing racial injustice and social division.

"Better Than We Found It" was promoted through televised performances and an accompanying music video featuring footage of Black Lives Matter protests. Reaching at number 40 on the US Hot Country Songs chart, the song was praised by critics for its political message. "Better Than We Found It" received a nomination for Video of the Year at the Academy of Country Music Awards.

== Background and release ==
Before releasing "Better Than We Found It", Morris publicly supported the Black Lives Matter (BLM) movement. Responding to Mickey Guyton's criticism of country artists who remained silent on racism, she wrote that many viewed speaking out as "polarizing" or "political", adding that it was "100% [...] not". According to Morris, she wrote "Better Than We Found It" to express "exactly how [she felt] right now", which came together quickly. She described it as "a protest song" and called protesting "the most American thing", citing Bob Dylan and Nina Simone as influences. Morris also said she wanted to write a song that carried "weight but also had hope" at a time when the world was in "a perpetual mourning period". "Better Than We Found It" was released on October 2, 2020, in solidarity with the Black Lives Matter protests that took place across the United States.

== Theme and composition ==
"Better Than We Found It" was written by Morris, Jessie Jo Dillon, Jimmy Robbins, and Laura Veltz, while Greg Kurstin produced it. Its lyrics question how history will judge people's responses to contemporary social issues, asking whether they will "do nothing about it" or "leave this world better than we found it".

Morris said she did not begin her career intending to become "an activist", but that witnessing inequality within country music made it impossible to "shut your eyes again". She viewed "Better Than We Found It" as an extension of her increasingly outspoken stance on racial inequality and other social issues.

== Promotion and music video ==
On January 4, 2021, Morris performed "Better Than We Found It" on The Late Show with Stephen Colbert ahead of the Georgia Senate runoff elections. She also performed the song at the Democratic National Convention in Chicago on August 21, 2024, to support Kamala Harris's for her presidential campaign.

The accompanying music video was directed by Gabrielle Woodland. It intersperses footage of Black Lives Matter protests with profiles of Nashville residents who have experienced discrimination, harassment, or police brutality, including DREAMer and mariachi singer Gustavo Flores and the family of Daniel Hambrick, who was fatally shot by a Nashville police officer in 2018. The video concludes with Morris reading a letter to her and husband Ryan Hurd's newborn son, in which she acknowledges the state of the world and promises to "do better" for his generation.

== Critical reception ==
Jon Caramanica of The New York Times wrote that, although "Better Than We Found It" could initially be heard as a song about "the kind of paean to faith and neighborliness and good acts", its references to xenophobia, political silence, and "blue-clad wolves" make its political message unmistakable. NME's Kyann-Sian Williams described it as a "powerful protest song", writing that Morris uses the track to support the Black Lives Matter movement while presenting its message as one that extends beyond race and calls for a "better world". "Better Than We Found It" was nominated for Video of the Year at the Academy of Country Music Awards.

== Personnel ==
Credits were adapted from Tidal.

- Maren Morris – lead vocals, songwriter
- Greg Kurstin – producer, mixing engineer, recording engineer, bass, drums, electric guitar, harmonica, percussion, piano
- Jessie Jo Dillon – songwriter
- Jimmy Robbins – songwriter, acoustic guitar, overdub engineer, vocal engineer
- Laura Veltz – songwriter
- Julian Burg – recording engineer
- Randy Merrill – mastering engineer

== Charts ==
Weekly chart performance
| Chart (2020) | Peak position |
|---|---|
| US Hot Country Songs (Billboard) | 40 |
