= Girl: The World Tour =

2019 concert tour by Maren Morris

- Tour by Maren Morris
- Associated album: Girl
- Start date: March 9, 2019
- End date: November 16, 2019
- Legs: 5
- No. of shows: 47 in North America; 12 in Europe; 6 in Oceania; 65 total

Maren Morris concert chronology
- The Hero Tour (2017); Girl: The World Tour (2019); Humble Quest Tour (2022)

Girl: The World Tour was the second concert tour by American singer Maren Morris in support of her second major label studio album, Girl (2019). The tour began on March 9, 2019, at Riviera Theatre in Chicago and concluded on November 16, 2019, at The Armory in Minneapolis.

== Development ==
Maren Morris announced the tour on January 17, 2019, a day prior to the release of "Girl". The tour was set to visit North America, Europe and Oceania. Maren also brought out Cassadee Pope & RaeLynn to open for her on select dates. Recently Morris extended the tour by adding music festival appearances and additional dates with Kassi Ashton & Hailey Whitters.

== Critical reception ==
Reviewing the opening show in Chicago, The Early Registration wrote that Morris called "her own shots" and "cooking up own flavor". Dave Paulson of Tennessean described the show as a "pocket-sized arena spectacle". Jeremy Burchard of Taste Of Country stated that Morris found the "strike to balance" between "burgeoning superstar" and "humble songwriter" during her show in Nashville. Katie Boudreau of 303 Magazine praised Morris' stage presence and vocal power, and stated that Morris delivered a "knockout" performance. Reviewing the show in Los Angeles, Chris Willman of Variety noted "Make Out with Me" and "RSVP" performances as "the most theatrical" and "arguably best", called her "the next JoJo".

== Set list ==
The set list is representative of the concert on March 19, 2019. It does not represent all concerts for the duration of the tour.

1. "Girl"
2. "The Feels"
3. "80s Mercedes"
4. "A Song for Everything"
5. "Common"
6. "To Hell & Back"
7. "All My Favorite People" (with Cassadee Pope)
8. "I Could Use a Love Song"
9. "Make Out with Me"
10. "Gold Love"
11. "Flavor"
12. "Great Ones"
13. "Once"
14. "Rich"
15. "RSVP"
16. "The Bones"
17. "My Church"

Encore

18. "Shade"
19. "The Middle"

Notes:

- During the show in Nashville, Brandi Carlile joined Morris to perform "Common", Miranda Lambert and Natalie Hemby joined her to perform "Virginia Bluebell" and "I Wish I Was". The trio along with Cassadee Pope also joined her during "My Church".
- During the show in Los Angeles, JoJo joined Morris to perform "Common" and a cover of "Too Little Too Late".
- During the European leg of the tour, RaeLynn joined Morris to perform "All My Favorite People".

== Tour dates ==
List of concerts, showing date, city, country, venue, and opening acts.
Date	City	Country	Venue	Opening acts
Leg 1 — North America
March 9, 2019	Chicago	United States	Riviera Theatre	Cassadee Pope
March 13, 2019	Nashville	United States	Ryman Auditorium	Cassadee Pope
March 15, 2019	Kansas City	United States	Arvest Bank Theatre	Cassadee Pope
March 16, 2019	Oklahoma City	United States	The Criterion	Cassadee Pope
March 18, 2019	Denver	United States	Fillmore Auditorium	Cassadee Pope
March 19, 2019	Salt Lake City	United States	The Union	Cassadee Pope
March 21, 2019	Portland	United States	Crystal Ballroom	Cassadee Pope
March 23, 2019	Seattle	United States	Showbox SoDo	Cassadee Pope
March 26, 2019	San Francisco	United States	SF Masonic Auditorium	Cassadee Pope
March 28, 2019	Anaheim	United States	House of Blues	Cassadee Pope
March 30, 2019	Los Angeles	United States	The Wiltern	Cassadee Pope
April 4, 2019 (Note: The concert on April 4, 2019 at Fort Lauderdale Beach Park in Fort Lauderdale, Florida is part of Rock the Ocean's Tortuga Music Festival.)	Fort Lauderdale	United States	Fort Lauderdale Beach Park	—
April 11, 2019	Atlanta	United States	Coca-Cola Roxy	RaeLynn
April 18, 2019	Houston	United States	Revention Music Center	RaeLynn
April 19, 2019	Dallas	United States	The Bomb Factory	RaeLynn
April 20, 2019	New Braunfels	United States	Whitewater Amphitheatre	RaeLynn
April 25, 2019	Pittsburgh	United States	Stage AE	RaeLynn
April 26, 2019	Philadelphia	United States	The Fillmore Philadelphia	RaeLynn
April 27, 2019	Boston	United States	House of Blues	RaeLynn
May 2, 2019	Washington, D.C.	United States	The Anthem	RaeLynn
May 3, 2019	Brooklyn	United States	Brooklyn Steel	RaeLynn
May 4, 2019	New York City	United States	Terminal 5	RaeLynn
May 9, 2019	St. Louis	United States	The Pageant	RaeLynn
May 10, 2019	Indianapolis	United States	Egyptian Room	RaeLynn
May 11, 2019	Detroit	United States	The Fillmore Detroit	RaeLynn
Leg 2 — Europe
May 17, 2019	Berlin	Germany	Columbia	RaeLynn
May 18, 2019	Cologne	Germany	Kantine	RaeLynn
May 19, 2019	Zürich	Switzerland	Mascotte	RaeLynn
May 21, 2019	Hamburg	Germany	Gruenspan	RaeLynn
May 22, 2019	Amsterdam	Netherlands	Paradiso	RaeLynn
May 24, 2019	Dublin	Ireland	The Academy	RaeLynn
May 25, 2019	Leeds	England	O_{2} Academy Leeds	RaeLynn
May 26, 2019	Glasgow	Scotland	O_{2} Academy Glasgow	RaeLynn
May 27, 2019	Manchester	England	Albert Hall	RaeLynn
May 29, 2019	Bristol	England	O_{2} Academy Bristol	RaeLynn
May 30, 2019	Birmingham	England	O_{2} Academy Birmingham	RaeLynn
May 31, 2019	London	England	Royal Albert Hall	RaeLynn
Leg 3 — North America
June 9, 2019 (Note: The concert on June 9, 2019 at Nissan Stadium in Nashville, Tennessee is part of CMA Music Festival.)	Nashville	United States	Nissan Stadium	—
June 15, 2019 (Note: The concert on June 15, 2019 at Great Stage Park in Manchester, Tennessee is part of Bonnaroo Music Festival.)	Manchester	United States	Great Stage Park	—
June 21, 2019 (Note: The concert on June 21, 2019 at Huntington Bank Pavilion in Chicago, Illinois is part of LakeShake Festival.)	Chicago	United States	Huntington Bank Pavilion	—
July 19, 2019 (Note: The concert on July 19, 2019 at Brooklyn Trails Campground at Michigan International Speedway in Brooklyn, Michigan is part of Faster Horses.)	Brooklyn	United States	Brooklyn Trails Campground	—
July 20, 2019 (Note: The concert on July 20, 2019 at Country Jam Festival Grounds in Eau Claire, Wisconsin is part of Country Jam USA.)	Eau Claire	United States	Country Jam Festival Grounds	—
August 2, 2019 (Note: The concert on August 2, 2019 at Festival Grounds in Merritt, Canada is part of Rockin' River Music Fest.)	Merritt	Canada	Festival Grounds	—
August 3, 2019 (Note: The concert on August 3, 2019 at Lake Cowichan in Cowichan Valley, Canada is part of Sunfest Country Music Festival.)	Cowichan Valley	Canada	Lake Cowichan	—
August 4, 2019 (Note: The concert on August 4, 2019 at Gorge Amphitheatre in George, Washington is part of Watershed Music Festival.)	George	United States	Gorge Amphitheatre	—
August 10, 2019 (Note: The concert on August 10, 2019 at Burl's Creek Event Grounds in Oro-Medonte, Canada is part of Boots and Hearts Music Festival.)	Oro-Medonte	Canada	Burl's Creek Event Grounds	—
Leg 4 — Oceania
August 16, 2019	Auckland	New Zealand	Logan Campbell Centre	—
August 17, 2019	Christchurch	New Zealand	Christchurch Town Hall	—
August 19, 2019	Brisbane	Australia	Brisbane City Hall	—
August 21, 2019	Melbourne	Australia	Forum Theatre	—
August 22, 2019	Sydney	Australia	Enmore Theatre	—
August 23, 2019	Canberra	Australia	UC Refectory	—
Leg 5 — North America
August 30, 2019 (Note: The concert on August 30, 2019 at Heartland Events Center in Grand Island, Nebraska is part of Nebraska State Fair.)	Grand Island	United States	Heartland Events Center	—
August 31, 2019 (Note: The concert on August 31, 2019 at Festival Grounds in Buena Vista, Colorado is part of Seven Peaks Festival.)	Buena Vista	United States	Festival Grounds	—
September 5, 2019	Wallingford	United States	Toyota Oakdale Theatre	Kassi Ashton; Hailey Whitters
September 7, 2019	Philadelphia	United States	The Met Philadelphia	Kassi Ashton; Hailey Whitters
September 9, 2019	New York City	United States	Radio City Music Hall	Kassi Ashton; Hailey Whitters
September 12, 2019	Mesa	United States	Mesa Amphitheatre	Kassi Ashton; Hailey Whitters
September 13, 2019 (Note: The concert on September 13, 2019 at Del Mar Fairgrounds in Del Mar, California is part of Kaaboo Del Mar Festival.)	Del Mar	United States	Del Mar Fairgrounds	—
September 14, 2019	Los Angeles	United States	Greek Theatre	Kassi Ashton; Hailey Whitters
September 20, 2019	San Luis Obispo	United States	Avila Beach Golf Resort	Kassi Ashton; Hailey Whitters
September 26, 2019	Des Moines	United States	Des Moines Water Works Park	Kassi Ashton; Hailey Whitters
October 18, 2019	Nashville	United States	Ascend Amphitheater	Kassi Ashton; Hailey Whitters
November 15, 2019	Milwaukee	United States	Eagles Ballroom	Hailey Whitters; Tenille Townes
November 16, 2019	Minneapolis	United States	The Armory	Hailey Whitters; Tenille Townes
