= List of Billboard Adult Contemporary number ones of 2020 =

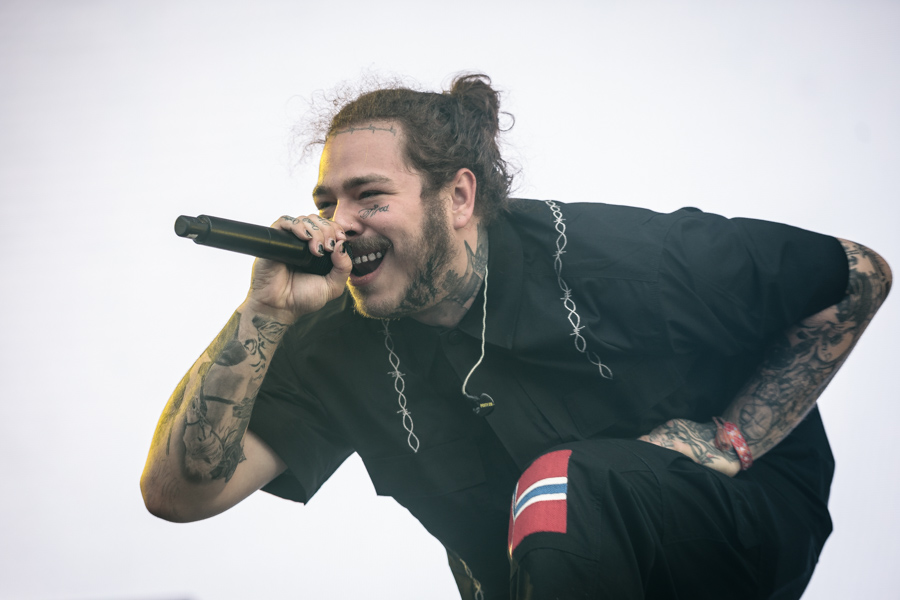
Post Malone's song "Circles" reached number one in early August in its 41st week on the chart, the second-longest climb to the top in the chart's history.

Adult Contemporary is a chart published by Billboard ranking the top-performing songs in the United States in the adult contemporary music (AC) market, based on weekly airplay data from radio stations compiled by Nielsen Broadcast Data Systems.

In the issue of Billboard dated January 4, "Sucker" by the Jonas Brothers returned to the top spot, displacing another of the group's songs, "Like It's Christmas", which was the final chart-topper of 2019. "Sucker" had spent 11 weeks atop the chart in the fall of 2019 and added a further six weeks to its total in 2020 before being displaced by "Someone You Loved" by Lewis Capaldi. The Scottish singer's track spent five weeks in the top spot to add to the single week it spent at number one in the previous year.

In late March, pop-rock band Maroon 5's song "Memories" reached number one, a position which it went on to hold for 20 weeks before it was replaced by "Circles" by rapper Post Malone in early August. In the issue of Billboard dated August 22, British singer Harry Styles gained his first AC number one with "Adore You", and two weeks later Maren Morris topped the chart for the first time in her own right with "The Bones"; she had previously reached number one as a featured vocalist on "The Middle" in collaboration with Zedd and Grey. In the issue of Billboard dated November 7, Canadian singer The Weeknd achieved his first Adult Contemporary number one with "Blinding Lights", which remained atop the chart for five consecutive weeks. The final AC number one of the year was a new version of the 1940s Christmas song "White Christmas" by Meghan Trainor featuring Seth MacFarlane; it was the first chart-topper for actor/singer MacFarlane. The song continued a trend of Christmas-themed tracks topping the AC chart in December, reflecting the fact that adult contemporary radio stations usually switch to playing exclusively festive songs in the period leading up to the holiday.

== Chart history ==
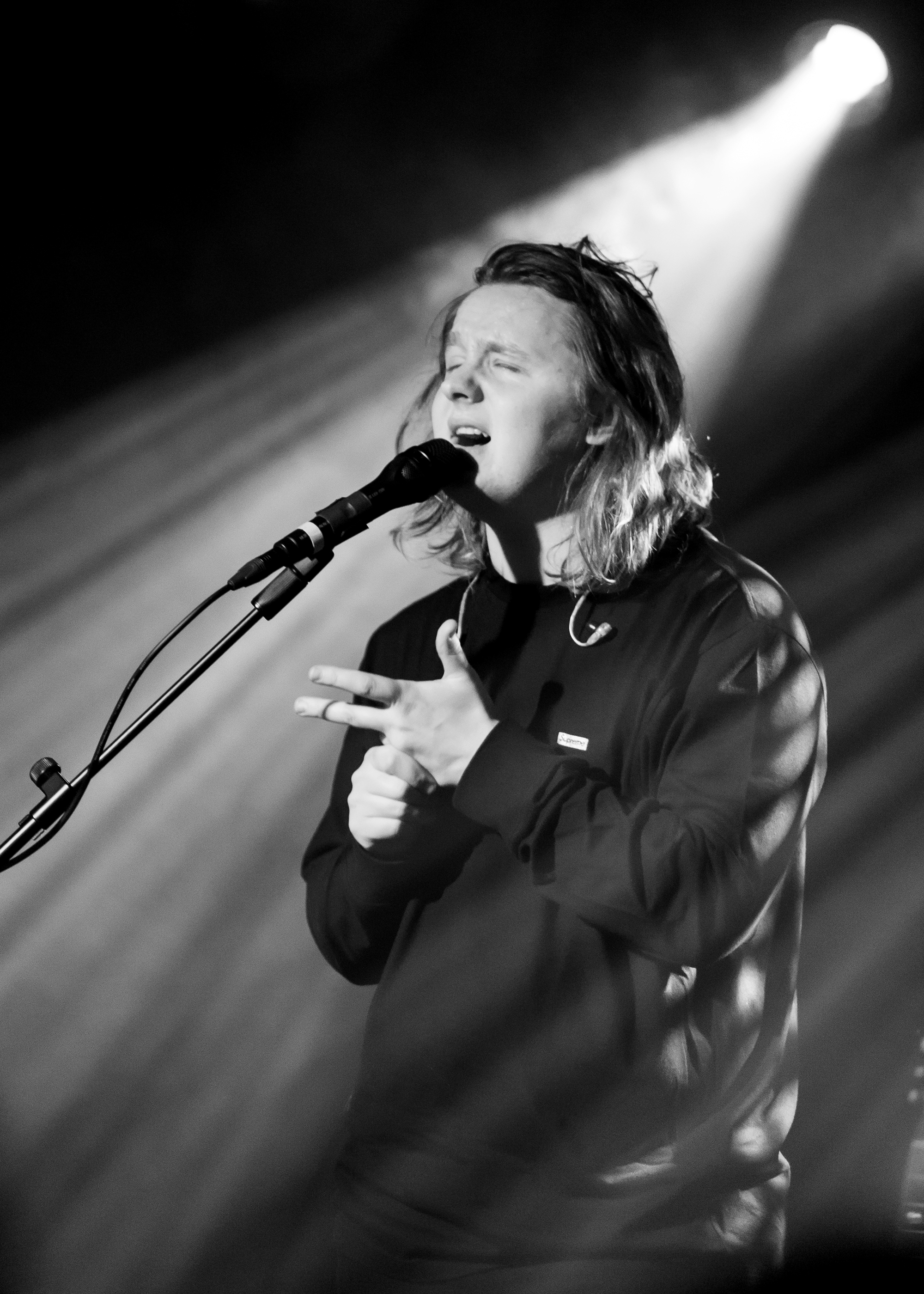
Scottish singer Lewis Capaldi spent five weeks at number one with his song "Someone You Loved". It had previously spent one week at number one in December 2019.

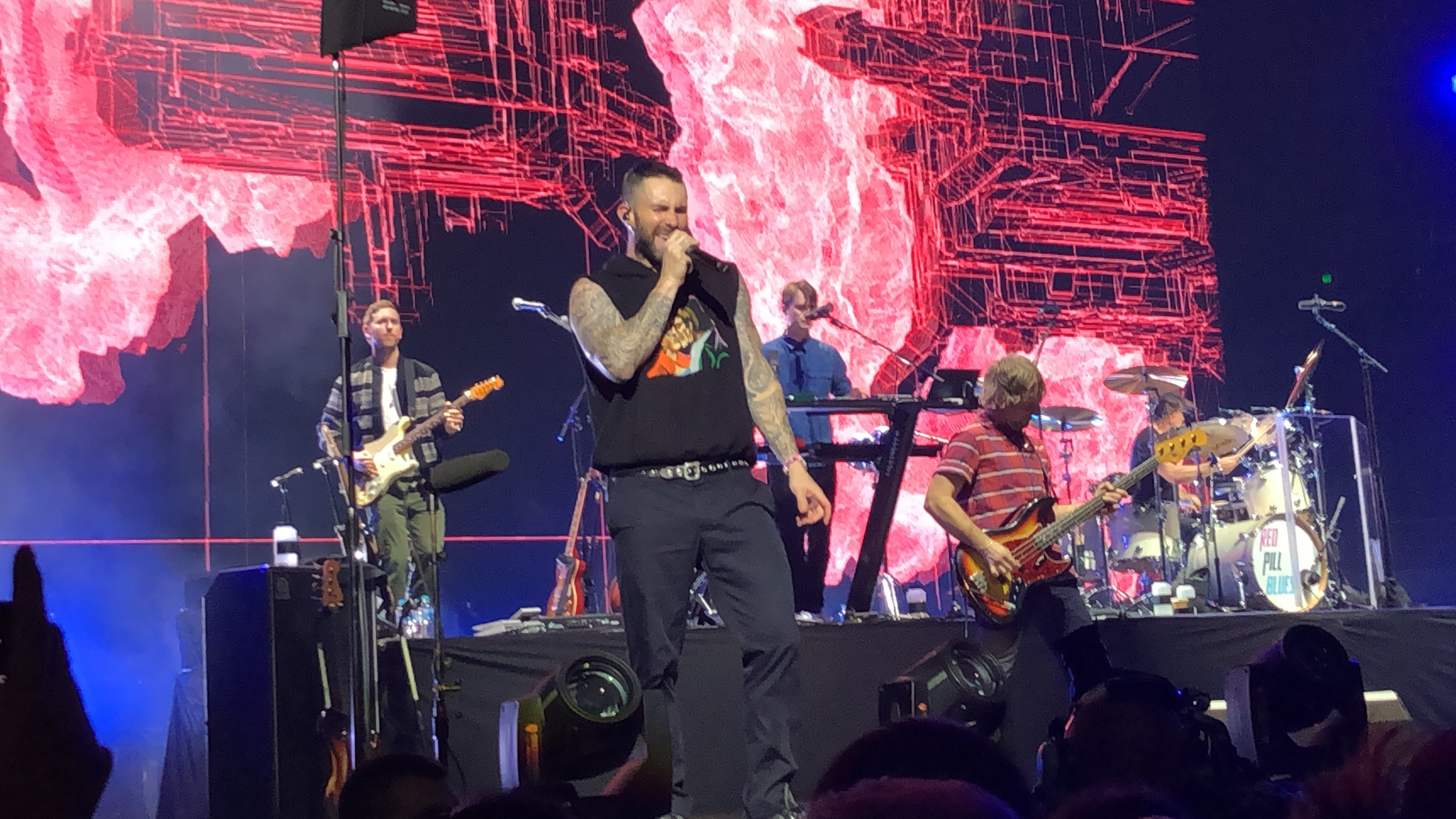
Pop-rock band Maroon 5's song "Memories" held the number one position for 20 weeks.

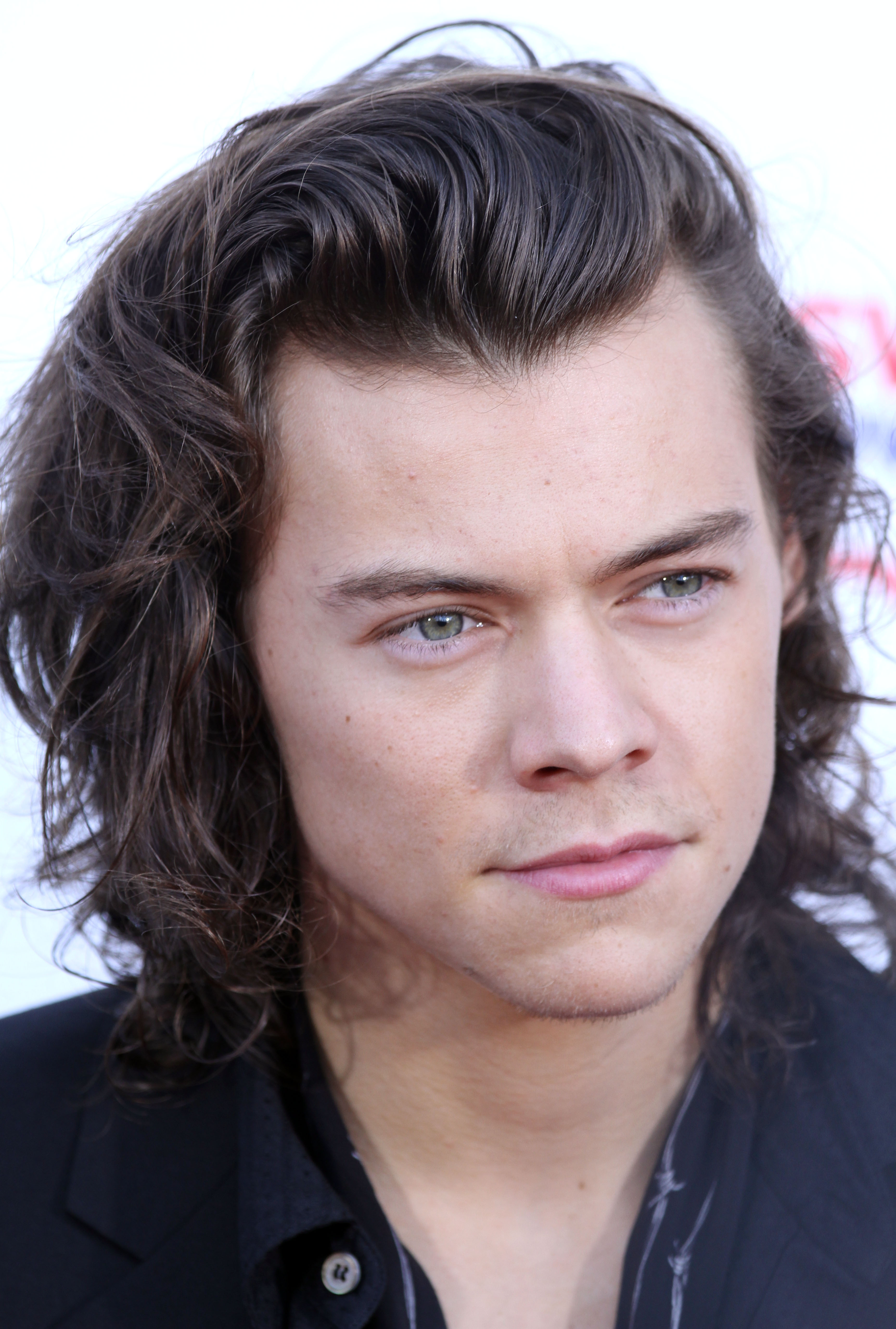
British singer Harry Styles's song "Adore You" spent two weeks at number one in August and returned to the top spot in September for eight weeks.

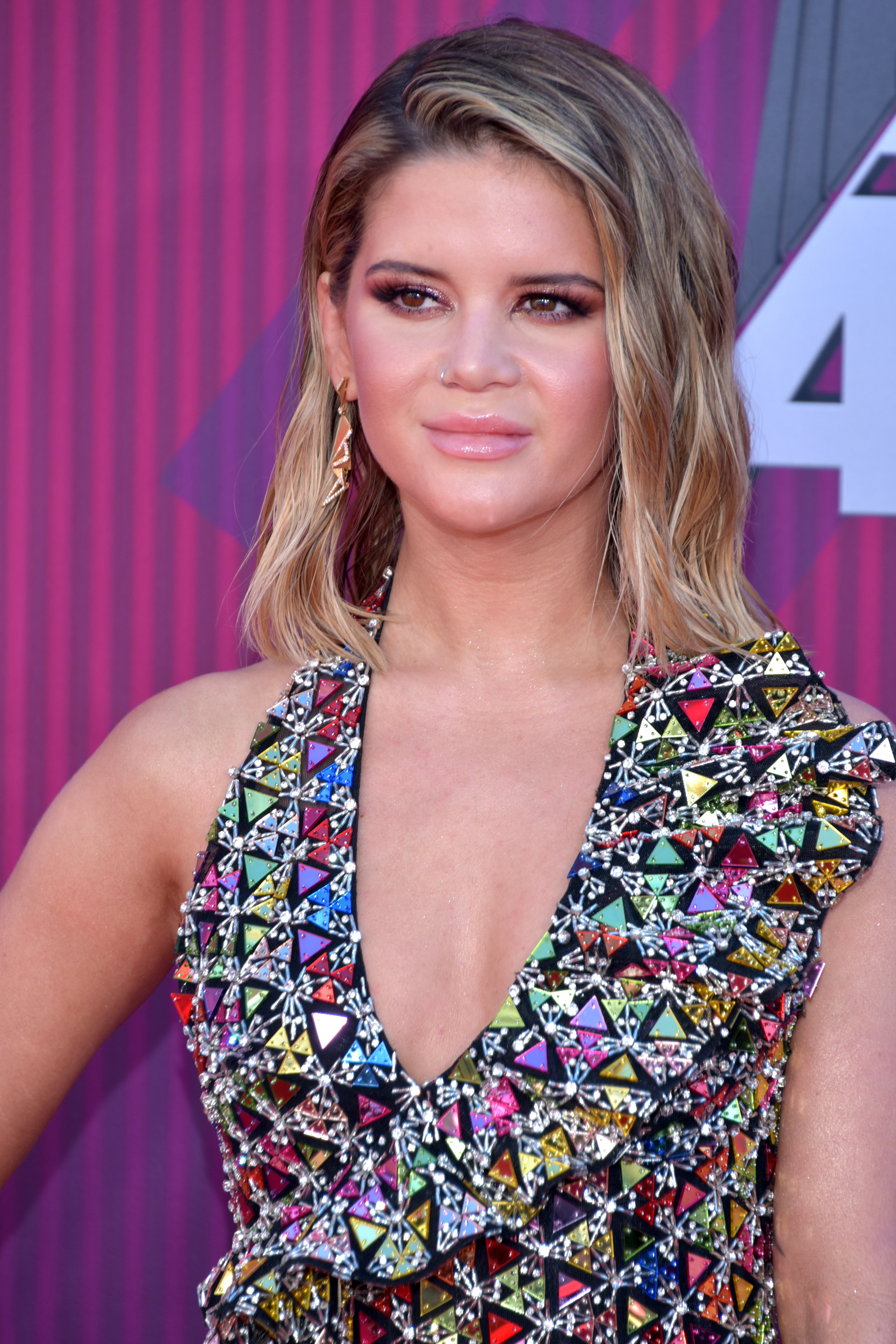
Country singer Maren Morris's song "The Bones" reached number one in early September.

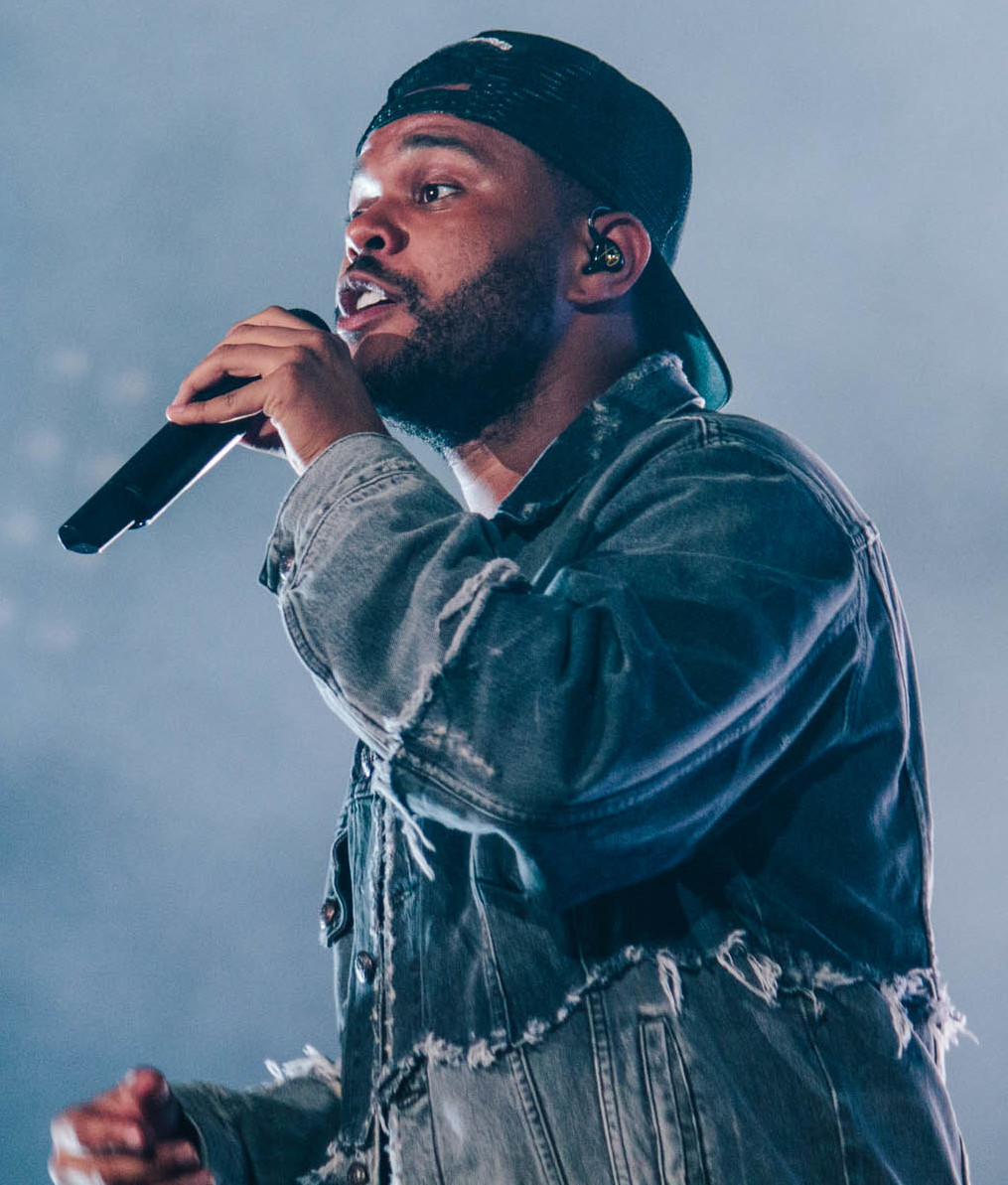
Canadian singer The Weeknd achieved his first Adult Contemporary number one with "Blinding Lights", which led for five consecutive weeks.

Key
†	Indicates best-performing AC song of 2020

Issue date	Title	Artist(s)	Ref.
January 4	"Sucker"	Jonas Brothers	
January 11	"Sucker"	Jonas Brothers	
January 18	"Sucker"	Jonas Brothers	
January 25	"Sucker"	Jonas Brothers	
February 1	"Sucker"	Jonas Brothers	
February 8	"Sucker"	Jonas Brothers	
February 15	"Someone You Loved"	Lewis Capaldi	
February 22	"Someone You Loved"	Lewis Capaldi	
February 29	"Someone You Loved"	Lewis Capaldi	
March 7	"Someone You Loved"	Lewis Capaldi	
March 14	"Someone You Loved"	Lewis Capaldi	
March 21	"Memories" †	Maroon 5	
March 28	"Memories" †	Maroon 5	
April 4	"Memories" †	Maroon 5	
April 11	"Memories" †	Maroon 5	
April 18	"Memories" †	Maroon 5	
April 25	"Memories" †	Maroon 5	
May 2	"Memories" †	Maroon 5	
May 9	"Memories" †	Maroon 5	
May 16	"Memories" †	Maroon 5	
May 23	"Memories" †	Maroon 5	
May 30	"Memories" †	Maroon 5	
June 6	"Memories" †	Maroon 5	
June 13	"Memories" †	Maroon 5	
June 20	"Memories" †	Maroon 5	
June 27	"Memories" †	Maroon 5	
July 4	"Memories" †	Maroon 5	
July 11	"Memories" †	Maroon 5	
July 18	"Memories" †	Maroon 5	
July 25	"Memories" †	Maroon 5	
August 1	"Memories" †	Maroon 5	
August 8	"Circles"	Post Malone	
August 15	"Circles"	Post Malone	
August 22	"Adore You"	Harry Styles	
August 29	"Adore You"	Harry Styles	
September 5	"The Bones"	Maren Morris	
September 12	"Adore You"	Harry Styles	
September 19	"Adore You"	Harry Styles	
September 26	"Adore You"	Harry Styles	
October 3	"Adore You"	Harry Styles	
October 10	"Adore You"	Harry Styles	
October 17	"Adore You"	Harry Styles	
October 24	"Adore You"	Harry Styles	
October 31	"Adore You"	Harry Styles	
November 7	"Blinding Lights"	The Weeknd	
November 14	"Blinding Lights"	The Weeknd	
November 21	"Blinding Lights"	The Weeknd	
November 28	"Blinding Lights"	The Weeknd	
December 5	"Blinding Lights"	The Weeknd	
December 12	"White Christmas"	Meghan Trainor featuring Seth MacFarlane	
December 19	"White Christmas"	Meghan Trainor featuring Seth MacFarlane	
December 26	"White Christmas"	Meghan Trainor featuring Seth MacFarlane	

== See also ==
- 2020 in American music
