= To a T (song) =

2018 song by Ryan Hurd

Single by Ryan Hurd

from the album Pelago
- Released: September 1, 2018
- Genre: Country
- Length: 2:58
- Label: RCA Nashville
- Songwriters: Laura Veltz; Nathan Spicer; Ryan Hurd
- Producers: Dann Huff; Aaron Eshuis

Ryan Hurd singles chronology
"Diamonds or Twine" (2018)	"To a T" (2018)	"Every Other Memory" (2020)

Music video
- "To a T" on YouTube

"To a T" is a song recorded by American country music singer Ryan Hurd. It was released on September 1, 2018, as the lead single from his EP Platonic. Hurd's wife Maren Morris sings the harmony vocals. Hurd, Laura Veltz and Nathan Spicer are the song's writers.

== Background ==
Hurd told PopCulture.com that "'To a T' is a love song, but it's like a sexy love song." He added, "the song title's double meaning are knowing someone 'To a T' and getting them into just a t-shirt is intentional."

== Music video ==
The music video was released on February 15, 2019. It about real love and real people play every stage of a relationship from new beginnings to a senior couple dancing in the kitchen.

== Commercial performance ==
As of January 2020, the song has sold 61,000 copies in US.

The song reached No. 23 on the Hot Country Songs chart, becoming Hurd's first entry.

== Charts ==
=== Weekly charts ===
Chart (2018–2020)	Peak position
Canada Country (Billboard)	43
US Bubbling Under Hot 100 (Billboard)	3
US Country Airplay (Billboard)	22
US Hot Country Songs (Billboard)	23

=== Year-end charts ===
Chart (2019)	Position
US Hot Country Songs (Billboard)	62
Chart (2020)	Position
US Hot Country Songs (Billboard)	81

== Certifications ==
Region	Certification	Certified units/sales
Canada (Music Canada)	Gold	40,000^{‡}
United States (RIAA)	Platinum	1,000,000^{‡}
^{‡} Sales+streaming figures based on certification alone.
