= Just for Now (Maren Morris song) =

Promotional single by Maren Morris

from the album Girl
- Written: 2016
- Released: June 12, 2020
- Genre: Indie rock
- Length: 4:00
- Label: Columbia
- Songwriters: Busbee; Maren Morris; Ryan Hurd
- Producers: Busbee; Ryan Hurd

Maren Morris promotional singles chronology
"Kingdom of One" (2019)	"Just for Now" (2020)	"Better Than We Found It" (2020)

Lyric video
- "Just for Now" on YouTube

"Just for Now" is a song by American singer and songwriter Maren Morris. It was released on June 12, 2020, as the second promotional single of Morris's second studio album, Girl (2019). Originally written during the recording sessions for her previous studio album, Hero (2016), the song was later completed and released as one of two bonus tracks added to the streaming edition of Girl. Produced by Ryan Hurd and Busbee, "Just for Now" is an indie rock song whose lyrics emphasize embracing the present rather than dwelling on an uncertain future.

== Background and release ==
More than a year after the release of her second studio album, Girl (2019), Morris issued "Just for Now" alongside "Takes Two" as two newly recorded tracks added to the album's streaming edition. The song was released June 12, 2020.

== Composition ==
Morris wrote "Just for Now" with Ryan Hurd and Busbee during the recording sessions for her debut major-label studio album, Hero (2016). It is an indie rock-tuned power ballad featuring prominent guitar instrumentation. Lyrically, the song encourages living in the present rather than worrying about the future, with Morris reassuring her partner that they do not have to "be the answer to a question that's gonna change [her] life".

== Personnel ==
Credits were adapted from Tidal.

- Maren Morris – vocals, songwriter, producer
- Busbee – producer, songwriter
- Ryan Hurd – songwriter

== Charts ==
Weekly chart performance
Chart (2020)	Peak position
US Hot Country Songs (Billboard)	40
