= Pick You Up (album) =

Studio album by Sheryl Crow
- Released: October 9, 2026
- Length: 25:01
- Labels: Old Green Barn Productions Inc; Thirty Tigers
- Producers: Sheryl Crow; Jeff Trott

Sheryl Crow chronology
Evolution (2024)	Pick You Up (2026)

Singles from Pick You Up
- 1. "Freedom Bus" Released: August 15, 2026; 2. "Freight Train" Released: September 17, 2026

Pick You Up is the thirteenth studio album by the American singer-songwriter Sheryl Crow. It was released on October 9, 2026, under Crow's own imprint Old Green Barn Productions Inc, with distribution handled by Thirty Tigers.

== Background and recording ==
Crow co-wrote the seven songs that comprise Pick You Up with her longtime collaborator Jeff Trott. In a press release, Crow described the album's songs as "a commentary on being human and wanting connection". The album's artwork features the painting The Elephant Who Forgot the Ocean by Tyson Grumm. After Crow saw the artwork at an auction and subsequently purchased it, she contacted Grumm to obtain permission to use it as the album artwork, in which he then agreed to allow Crow to do so.

In an interview with Billboard, Crow revealed that she initially intended Pick You Up to be a six-song EP with "Freedom Bus" excluded from the track listing before it was expanded to a full-length album after the song was completed due to the song's lyricism encapsulating Crow's feelings at the time of the state of the world.

== Promotion ==
The album's lead single, "Freedom Bus", was released in tandem with the announcement of the album on August 15, 2026. Crow released the second single, "Freight Train" on September 17, 2026 to positive reviews.

The album was BBC Radio 2's Album of The Week for the week of October 12, 2026.

The vinyl edition of the album will be released November 20, 2026.

== Track listing ==
All tracks are written by Sheryl Crow and Jeff Trott.

Pick You Up track listing
No.	Title	Length
1.	"Freight Train"	3:49
2.	"Perfect"	3:02
3.	"Pick You Up"	2:54
4.	"Flat Earth"	3:31
5.	"I've Got Your Number"	3:16
6.	"Heaven Help Us"	3:46
7.	"Freedom Bus" (featuring Jesse Welles)	4:43
Total length:		25:01

== Personnel ==
Credits are adapted from Tidal.

- Sheryl Crow – lead vocals, production (all tracks); background vocals (tracks 1–6), acoustic guitar (1–4, 6, 7), bass guitar (1–4, 6), electric piano (4, 5)
- Jeff Trott – production (all tracks), acoustic guitar (1–6), electric guitar (1–3, 5, 6), keyboards (1, 2, 4, 6), background vocals (1, 2, 7), claves (3), slide guitar (5, 7)
- Alberto Vaz – engineering, mixing
- Jordan Reed – engineering
- Nathan Dantzler – mastering
- Tim Smith – background vocals
- Fred Eltringham – drums (1–3, 5, 6), background vocals (7)
- Russ Pahl – guitars (1, 2, 6)
- Jennifer Gunderman – piano (2); background vocals, organ (7)
- Audley Freed – electric guitar (3, 4), background vocals (7)
- Andrew Petroff – bass guitar (5)
- Patrick Warren – music arrangement (6)
- Daphne Chen – viola, violin (6)
- Jesse Welles – background vocals (7)
- Robert Kearns – background vocals (7)
- Greg Phillinganes – keyboards (7)

== Charts ==
Chart performance for Pick You Up
Chart (2026)	Peak position
Japanese Digital Albums (Oricon)	80
Japanese Download Albums (Billboard Japan)	62
UK Album Downloads (Official Charts)	22
UK Americana Albums (Official Charts)	32
