= Evolution (Sheryl Crow album) =

Studio album by Sheryl Crow
- Released: March 29, 2024
- Studios: Phantom Studios (Gallatin, Tennessee); Multiview Studios (Los Angeles, California); Old Green Barn (Nashville, Tennessee)
- Genres: Country rock; Americana
- Length: 41:02
- Label: Big Machine
- Producers: Mike Elizondo; Sheryl Crow; John Shanks

Sheryl Crow chronology
Threads (2019)	Evolution (2024)	Pick You Up (2026)

Singles from Evolution
- 1. "Alarm Clock" Released: November 3, 2023; 2. "Evolution" Released: January 12, 2024; 3. "Do It Again" Released: February 9, 2024; 4. "Digging in the Dirt" Released: March 8, 2024

Evolution is the twelfth studio album by American singer-songwriter Sheryl Crow. It was released on March 29, 2024, through Big Machine, her second and final release with the label. It was her first studio album in five years, and was announced after she was inducted into the Rock and Roll Hall of Fame in November 2023.

The album received mostly positive reviews from critics, but was a commercial failure and peaked at number 90 on the UK Albums Chart, her lowest-charting album to date and did not enter the Billboard 200 U.S. charts.

== Background ==
Crow announced the album on November 3, 2023, which came as a surprise since she had previously stated her intentions to not release another album following 2019's Threads. The news arrived just ahead of her induction into the Rock and Roll Hall of Fame that same day. Crow explained that music and lyrics on the album stem from "sitting in the quiet and writing from a deep soul place". The creation process started by Crow recording a couple of demos which she then sent to producer Mike Elizondo. Songs "just kept flowing" out of her and it would soon be obvious that "this was going to be an album". Following the release of Threads four years prior, she announced that she would never make another record because there would be "no point to it". However, in creating Evolution, she found that the music comes from her soul. Crow said that she hoped "whoever hears this record can feel that".

== Commercial performance ==
In the United States, Evolution peaked at number 24 on the US Billboard Album Sales Chart.

In the United Kingdom, the album peaked at number 90 on the UK Official Albums Chart, and number 6 on the UK Album Downloads Chart.

== Critical reception ==
Professional ratings
Aggregate scores
Source	Rating
Metacritic	73/100
Review scores
Source	Rating
Louder	3/5 stars
i	2.0/5 stars
AllMusic	4/5 stars
Glide Magazine	Positive
Riff Magazine	7/10 stars
Clash	8/10 stars
Rolling Stone	8/10 stars
Pitchfork	6/10 stars

Evolution received generally positive reviews from music critics. Giving the album an 8/10, Emma Harrison of Clash Magazine calls Evolution a "soul-searching and liberating surprise return from the Grammy-award winner." Vera Maksymiuk of Riff Magazine says the album "is at its core authentically Sheryl Crow, with an elevated artistic vision and concept to match." Jeremy Lukens of Glide Magazine, conceding that "Crow's artistic peak was from 1992-2002," claims that Evolution's "blending of new territory with Crow's signature sound has enough music to satisfy the fans."

Multiple reviewers, however, criticized the album for sounding too familiar. Pat Carty of Louder, who rated the album 3 stars out of 5, says the album "becomes a bit by-numbers" following the opening four songs. Ed Power of i says the album is "too bland to leave an impression" and that "Music has moved on in the last 30 years - but Crow is still in the same disposable groove." Claire Shaffer of Pitchfork rated the album a 6/10 and says that Crow's "new album sometimes makes her singular appeal feel generic."

== Track listing ==
Evolution – Deluxe version
No.	Title	Writer(s)	Length
1.	"Alarm Clock"	Sheryl Crow; Mike Elizondo; Emily Weisband	2:54
2.	"Digging in the Dirt" (featuring Peter Gabriel)	Peter Gabriel	5:24
3.	"Do It Again"	Crow; John Shanks	4:13
4.	"Love Life"	Crow; Elizondo; Weisband	5:13
5.	"You Can't Change the Weather"	Crow; Jeff Trott	4:03
6.	"Evolution"	Crow	4:26
7.	"Where?"	Crow; Bill Bottrell	3:53
8.	"Don't Walk Away"	Crow	4:22
9.	"Broken Record"	Crow	3:07
10.	"Waiting in the Wings"	Crow; Elizondo; Ilsey Juber	3:27
Total length:			41:02

Note

- The standard edition omits "Digging in the Dirt".

== Personnel ==
Musicians

- Sheryl Crow – lead vocals (all tracks), background vocals (tracks 1, 3–7, 9, 10), acoustic guitar (3, 4, 9), Wurlitzer electric piano (3, 5, 9), harp (3); clapping, keyboards (4); piano (8)
- Mike Elizondo – keyboards (tracks 1, 2, 5–10), bass (1, 2, 4–7, 9, 10), drum programming (1, 2, 5, 6, 9, 10), electric guitar (1, 2, 9, 10), background vocals (4, 9), clapping (4), acoustic guitar (6), percussion (7)
- Wendy Melvoin – electric guitar (tracks 2, 4)
- Keefus Ciancia – keyboards (tracks 2, 4)
- Peter Gabriel – lead vocals (track 2)
- E Rounds – drums, percussion (track 2)
- Lisa Coleman – Hammond B3 (track 2)
- Fred Eltringham – drums (tracks 3, 6, 10), percussion (3, 6, 7)
- John Shanks – acoustic guitar, background vocals, electric guitar, synth pads (track 3)
- Tim Smith – acoustic guitar, background vocals, bass, electric guitar (track 3)
- Jeff Trott – electric guitar (track 3)
- Justin Francis – tenor guitar (track 3)
- Terence F. Clark – drums (tracks 4, 5, 9), percussion (4, 5); background vocals, clapping (4)
- Max Townsley – acoustic guitar (track 5)
- Tom Morello – electric guitar (track 6)
- Rob Moose – viola, violin (tracks 6–8)
- Bill Bottrell – acoustic guitar (track 7)
- Alex Wilder – background vocals (track 9)
- Erica Block – background vocals (track 9)

Technical

- Mike Elizondo – production (tracks 1, 2, 4–10)
- John Shanks – production (track 3)
- Sheryl Crow – production (track 3)
- Chris Gehringer – mastering
- Adam Hawkins – mixing
- Justin Francis – engineering
- Jaime Sickora – engineering (track 2)
- Katie May – engineering (track 2)
- Alberto Vaz – engineering (track 3)
- Bradley Giroux – engineering (track 3)
- Rob Moose – engineering, string arrangement (tracks 6–8)
- Alex Wilder – engineering assistance
- Erica Block – engineering assistance

== Charts ==
Chart performance for Evolution
Chart (2024)	Peak position
Australian Digital Albums (ARIA)	5
Australian Physical Albums (ARIA)	55
Austrian Albums (Ö3 Austria)	70
Belgian Albums (Ultratop Flanders)	93
Belgian Albums (Ultratop Wallonia)	112
German Albums (Offizielle Top 100)	67
Scottish Albums (Official Charts)	6
Swiss Albums (Schweizer Hitparade)	9
UK Albums (Official Charts)	90
UK Americana Albums (Official Charts)	3
US Top Album Sales (Billboard)	24
