= To Hell & Back (song) =

2020 single by Maren Morris

Single by Maren Morris

from the album Girl
- Released: March 30, 2020
- Genre: Country pop
- Length: 3:11
- Label: Columbia Nashville
- Songwriters: Maren Morris; Jessie Jo Dillon; Laura Veltz
- Producers: Maren Morris; Busbee

Maren Morris singles chronology
| "Prove You Wrong" (2019) | "To Hell & Back" (2020) | "Line by Line" (2021) |

Music video
- "To Hell & Back" on YouTube

"To Hell & Back" is a song by American singer Maren Morris. It was released on March 30, 2020, as the third single from her second studio album, Girl. Morris wrote the song along with Jessie Jo Dillon and Laura Veltz.

== Release and content ==
Released on March 30, 2020, "To Hell and Back" is an acceptance song about loving a person for their entire journey—not just what they appear to be in the here and now. Simultaneously is also a love letter to her husband, Ryan Hurd.

== Live performance ==
On September 16, 2020, Morris performed "To Hell & Back" during the 2020 ACM Awards at Nashville's Ryman Auditorium. On October 21, Morris and Brandi Carlile performed it at the 2020 CMT Music Awards.

== Charts ==
=== Weekly charts ===
| Chart (2020–2021) | Peak position |
|---|---|
| Canada Country (Billboard) | 48 |
| US Country Airplay (Billboard) | 32 |
| US Hot Country Songs (Billboard) | 35 |

=== Year-end charts ===
| Chart (2020) | Position |
|---|---|
| US Hot Country Songs (Billboard) | 87 |
