= Killing of Daniel Hambrick =

2018 police shooting in Tennessee

On July 26, 2018, Daniel Edward Hambrick, a 25 year old African-American was shot and killed by officer Andrew Delke of the Nashville, Tennessee police department.

Hambrick was shot as he was running away from Delke after allegedly pointing a gun at the officer. Delke was searching for a white Chevrolet Impala which he had attempted to pull over earlier that day. He saw a white car which he thought was the Impala, so he pulled alongside it. It was at this time that Hambrick began to run away while carrying a handgun. Delke then pursued Hambrick and gave him commands to drop the weapon. Hambrick refused to drop the weapon, Delke then fired four times with three of the shots striking Hembrick. He was hit in the back of the head, back, and left torso. Hambrick died shortly after the shooting.

Delke was placed on "routine administrative leave," and the Tennessee Bureau of Investigation (TBI) began investigating the shooting. There was no body camera, nor dash camera footage of the shooting.

== Criminal homicide charge ==
On Sept. 27, District Attorney Glenn Funk's office filed a criminal homicide charge against Delke. Delke's lead defense attorney said that his client would plead not guilty, because he was acting in self defense.

Prosecutors rejected the self defense argument and said Delke had broken the law by opening fire on a man whose back was turned. The arrest warrant notes that Delke stopped running during the chase, and shot at Hambrick while he was running away.

The officer's arrest warrant provided new details from the TBI investigation into the lead-up to the shooting. Agents found that Delke continued following the car even after learning it wasn't stolen "to see if he could develop a reason to stop the Impala," according to the warrant.

== Preliminary hearings ==
During preliminary hearings between Jan. 4 and Jan. 7, Delke's interview with the TBI were made public, including an excerpt where he said he “had absolutely no choice” when he shot and killed Hambrick.

“I said to myself, ‘If I don’t shoot him right now, I’m gonna die. So that’s what I did,’” Delke said.

Delke told investigators that, at one point during the foot chase, he saw Hambrick turn to look at him and point a gun in his direction. Delke said he told Hambrick to drop the gun or he would shoot.

Video released by the Nashville district attorney's office showed Hambrick running away as Officer Delke fatally shot him. The surveillance video, obtained by the Tennessee Bureau of Investigation from a nearby school, appeared to contradict the self defense claim, and failed to confirm that Hambrick pointed a gun at Officer Delke while running away from him.

== Grand jury indictment for first-degree murder ==
On Jan. 18, 2019: A Nashville grand jury indicted Delke on a first-degree murder charge. Delke at the time was the first Nashville officer ever to be charged after an on-duty shooting.

== Hambrick family lawsuit ==
In March 2019, Hambrick's family sued the city and Delke for $30 million, saying racism on the force led to Hambrick's death. The suit says the police department created a "culture of fear, violence, racism and impunity" that Delke "internalized" at the police training academy and on the job. That culture, the lawsuit states, led to Hambrick's death. 2 years later, in March 2021, the Hambrick family reached a settlement, and Metro Council approved Nashville's $2.25 million payment to settle the Hambrick family's wrongful death lawsuit.

== Plea deal ==
In July 2021, Delke reached a deal with prosecutors just days before jury selection was to begin. Officer Delke pleaded guilty to voluntary manslaughter. He was sentenced to three years in prison. He was set to go before the Tennessee parole board in January 2022, but waived his hearing as part of his plea agreement.

Andrew Delke was released from prison on October 27, 2022.
