= Kingdom of One =

Promotional single by Maren Morris

from the album For the Throne: Music Inspired by the HBO Series Game of Thrones
- Released: April 26, 2019
- Length: 3:35
- Label: Columbia
- Songwriters: Eric Frederic; Maren Morris; Sam Harris; Nate Mercereau; Wayne Hector
- Producer: Ricky Reed

Maren Morris promotional singles chronology
"Common" (2019)	"Kingdom of One" (2019)	"Just for Now" (2020)

Lyric video
- "Kingdom of One" on YouTube

"Kingdom of One" is a song by American singer and songwriter Maren Morris. It was released on April 26, 2019, as a promotional single of For the Throne: Music Inspired by the HBO Series Game of Thrones (2019). Produced by Ricky Reed, the song was written by Morris with Reed, Nate Mercereau, Sam Harris, and Wayne Hector. Inspired by the world of Game of Thrones, "Kingdom of One" incorporates dark, atmospheric production and lyrics reflecting the series' themes of power, conflict, and resilience.

== Background and release ==
"Kingdom of One" was released as part of For the Throne, a soundtrack album inspired by the eighth and final season of Game of Thrones. Announced by Home Box Office (HBO) and Columbia Records in April 2019, the project marked HBO's first collaboration with a major record label on a soundtrack and featured original songs by artists including SZA, Ellie Goulding, the Weeknd, and Morris.

Ahead of the song's release, Morris promoted "Kingdom of One" on social media, writing that she had "channeled [her] inner Daenerys Targaryen" while recording it and encouraging fans to let the song "take you there" in anticipation of Game of Thrones. The song was released on April 12, 2019.

== Composition ==
Built around a descending minor-key acoustic guitar progression, "Kingdom of One" features lyrics inspired by the imagery and themes of Game of Thrones. The song gradually builds in intensity toward its chorus, where Morris delivers the defiant refrain, "So you wanna play God? / Come on / Is that all you got? / Come on". It also references Depeche Mode's 1989 song "Personal Jesus" with the lyric, "Reach out and touch your faith."

== Critical reception ==
Writing for Texas Monthly, Dan Solomon praised "Kingdom of One" as a "reverb-drenched, minor-key exploration of the loneliness" found in the world of Game of Thrones. He also viewed the song as "a bit of a flex" from Morris, arguing that she successfully stepped outside her country and pop "comfort zones" while sounding equally convincing in a darker musical style.

== Personnel ==
Credits were adapted from Tidal.

- Maren Morris – vocals, songwriter
- Ricky Reed – producer, songwriter, (Note: Credited as Eric Frederic) executive producer, mixing
- Nate Mercereau – songwriter, guitar
- Sam Harris – songwriter
- Wayne Hector – songwriter
- D. B. Weiss – executive producer
- David Benioff – executive producer
- Ethan Shumaker – recording engineer
- Nathan Spicer – recording engineer
