= Prove You Wrong (song) =

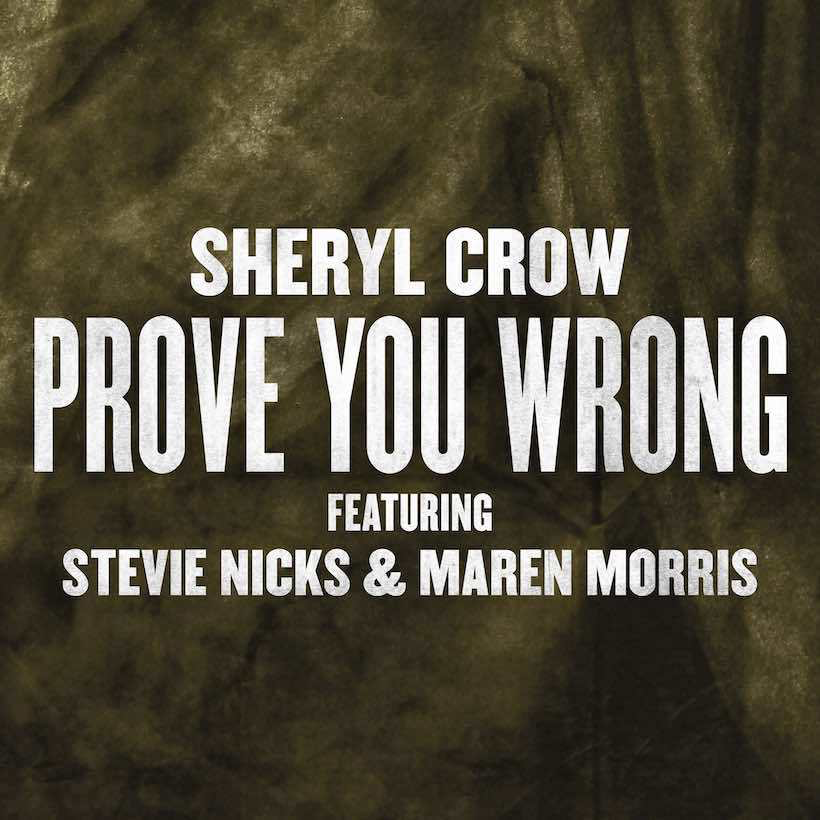

Single by Sheryl Crow featuring Stevie Nicks and Maren Morris

from the album Threads
- Released: June 5, 2019
- Length: 3:41
- Label: Big Machine
- Songwriters: Al Anderson; Leslie Satcher; Sheryl Crow
- Producer: Steve Jordan

Sheryl Crow singles chronology
"Redemption Day" (2019)	"Prove You Wrong" (2019)	"Tell Me When It's Over" (2019)

Stevie Nicks singles chronology
"Borrowed" (2018)	"Prove You Wrong" (2019)	"Edge of Midnight" (Midnight Sky remix) (2020)

Maren Morris singles chronology
"The Bones" (2019)	"Prove You Wrong" (2019)	"To Hell & Back" (2020)

Lyric video
- "Prove You Wrong" on YouTube

"Prove You Wrong" is a song by American singer Sheryl Crow featuring Stevie Nicks and Maren Morris. It was released on June 5, 2019, as the third single of Crow's eleventh studio album, Threads (2019). A midtempo song centered on female empowerment themes, it features guest vocal contributions from Morris and Nicks alongside instrumentation by Joe Walsh, Vince Gill, and Waddy Wachtel.

== Background and release ==
"Prove You Wrong" was released as the third single of Crow's eleventh studio album, Threads (2019), following "Live Wire" and "Redemption Day". An accompanying lyric video was unveiled on the same day. Crow said she invited Morris to join herself and Stevie Nicks on the song because she believed Morris belonged in their "club" of "strong female rockers who tell it like it is". According to Crow, "Prove You Wrong" originated during the making of Threads, a project she began by inviting artists who had inspired her throughout her career to collaborate. After Nicks agreed to record the song, Crow decided to "pay it forward" by inviting Morris, whom she described as "a really tough, but super sweet, great songwriter, great musician", adding that she believed Morris was "going to be around for a long time". Crow said that bringing Nicks and Morris together ultimately led to the creation of "Prove You Wrong".

== Composition ==
Morris performs the bridge, while Nicks contributes vocals toward the song's conclusion. In addition to guest vocals from them, "Prove You Wrong" features contributions from Joe Walsh, Vince Gill, and Waddy Wachtel. The song was written by Crow, Al Anderson, and Leslie Satcher, and produced by Steve Jordan. Jordan also played bass guitar and drums, while Wachtel contributed acoustic and electric guitar and Walsh and Gill played electric guitar. The song was recorded by Dave O'Donnell and Niko Bolas, mixed by Justin Niebank, digitally edited by Lars Fox, and mastered by Greg Calbi and Steve Fallone. Pam Wertheimer served as production coordinator.

A midtempo song, it is built around a singalong melody. The lyrics are driven by themes of female empowerment, depicting the narrator dismissing a former partner's objections and affirming her decision to move on, declaring, "It wouldn't take much to prove you wrong / I got my mind made up and my high heels on".

== Live performances ==
Crow performed "Prove You Wrong" at the 2019 CMT Music Awards with Morris, and at the Ryman Auditorium in Nashville during the first of her two September 2019 concerts with Morris and Natalie Hemby.

== Personnel ==
Credits were adapted from Tidal.

- Sheryl Crow – lead vocals, songwriter
- Maren Morris – featured vocals
- Stevie Nicks – featured vocals
- Steve Jordan – producer, bass guitar, drums
- Al Anderson – songwriter
- Leslie Satcher – songwriter
- Waddy Wachtel – acoustic guitar, electric guitar
- Joe Walsh – electric guitar
- Vince Gill – electric guitar
- Justin Niebank – mixing engineer
- Greg Calbi – mastering engineer
- Steve Fallone – mastering engineer
- Dave O'Donnell – recording engineer
- Niko Bolas – recording engineer
- Lars Fox – digital editing engineer
- Pam Wertheimer – production coordinator

== Charts ==
Weekly chart performance
Chart (2019)	Peak position
US Country Airplay (Billboard)	33
