= Pelago (album) =

Studio album by Ryan Hurd
- Released: October 15, 2021
- Genre: Country
- Length: 38:46 (standard version); 51:32 (streaming version)
- Label: RCA Nashville
- Producer: Aaron Eshuis (all tracks); Teddy Reimer (track 3); Jesse Frasure (track 9)

Ryan Hurd chronology
EOM EP (2020)	Pelago (2021)	Midwest Rock & Roll (2025)

Singles from Pelago
- 1. "Chasing After You" Released: February 12, 2021; 2. "Pass It On" Released: February 22, 2022

Pelago is the debut studio album by American country music artist Ryan Hurd. It was released on October 15, 2021, via Arista Nashville. Its lead single, "Chasing After You", is certified Platinum by the RIAA.

== Content ==
The album's release was preceded by the single "Chasing After You" with Maren Morris. The song reached number two on the Country Airplay chart, giving Hurd his first top five single on the chart. "Pass It On" was released as the album's second single on February 22, 2022. Hurd co-wrote all but one of the album's tracks. "Tab with My Name on It" was previously recorded by Dallas Smith on his 2016 album, Side Effects.

== Critical reception ==
Nicole Piering of Country Swag wrote that with Hurd "having co-written ten of the album’s eleven tracks, Pelago truly continues" his "introduction as both a brilliant songwriter and an incredibly talented artist" and that "while it would be easy for Ryan Hurd to make a living as a writer, evidenced by his ever-growing and impressive body of work, he’s even more magical as an artist." Stephen Thomas Erlewine of AllMusic similarly wrote that the album "is filled with easy melodies, gilded surfaces, and soft R&B rhythms, a warm setting that allows Hurd to sound empathetic yet masculine."

== Commercial performance ==
Pelago debuted at number 11 on the Top Country Albums chart, and peaked at number 71 on the Billboard 200.

== Track listing ==
Pelago — CD/digital download versions
No.	Title	Writer(s)	Length
1.	"Pass It On"	Ryan Hurd; Michael Hardy; Maren Morris; Jordan Schmidt	2:59
2.	"Coast"	Hurd; Aaron Eshuis	3:50
3.	"Chasing After You" (with Maren Morris)	Brinley Addington; Jerry Flowers	3:27
4.	"June, July, August"	Hurd; Zach Crowell; Chase McGill	3:01
5.	"Palm Trees in Ohio"	Hurd; Joe Clemmons; Eshuis	3:35
6.	"If I Had Two Hearts"	Hurd; Randy Montana; Will Weatherly	3:29
7.	"Tab with My Name on It"	Hurd; Eshuis; Joey Hyde	4:18
8.	"What Are You Drinking"	Hurd; Andy Albert; Troy Cartwright; Eshuis	3:24
9.	"Hell Is an Island"	Hurd; Eshuis; Shane McAnally; Matt McGinn	3:19
10.	"The Knife or the Hatchet"	Hurd; Jimmy Robbins; Laura Veltz	3:34
11.	"I Never Said I'm Sorry"	Hurd; Clemmons; Eshuis	3:50

Pelago — Streaming-exclusive bonus tracks
No.	Title	Writer(s)	Length
12.	"Platonic"	Hurd; McGinn; Nathan Spicer; Ryan Beaver	2:32
13.	"Every Other Memory"	Hurd; Cole Taylor; Spicer	3:39
14.	"To a T"	Hurd; Veltz; Spicer	2:58
15.	"Diamonds or Twine"	Hurd; Veltz; Mark Trussell	3:31

== Personnel ==
Tracks 1–11 adapted from Pelago liner notes. Tracks 12–15 adapted from Spotify.

=== Musicians ===
- Ryan Hurd — lead/background vocals
- Phil Lawson — drums/percussion
- Tony Lucido — bass
- Ilya Toshinsky — acoustic guitar, dobro, ukulele
- Aaron Eshuis — acoustic guitar, electric guitar, keyboards, programming, background vocals
- Matthew McGinn — acoustic guitar, electric guitar, keyboards, programming, background vocals
- Joe Clemmons — acoustic guitar
- Derek Wells — electric guitar
- Teddy Reimer — guitars, synth, programming
- Dave Cohen — keyboards
- Jesse Frasure — synth, programming
- Justin Niebank — programming
- Jason Saenz — trumpet
- Charlie Judge — strings
- Jun Iwasaki — violin
- David Davidson — violin
- Dave Angell — violin
- Alicia Enstrom — violin
- Kristin Wilkinson — viola
- Monisa Angell — viola
- Kevin Bate — cello
- Carole Rabinowitz — cello
- Katie Ohh — background vocals
- Maren Morris — duet vocals (track 3), background vocals
- Ben Caver — background vocals
- Michael Hardy — background vocals

=== Technical ===
- Aaron Eshuis — producer (all tracks), digital editing
- Teddy Reimer — producer (track 3)
- Jesse Frasure — producer (track 9)
- Dann Huff — producer (tracks 12 and 14)
- Mark Trussell — producer (track 15)
- Chris Small — digital editing
- Mike Stankiewicz — digital editing
- Manny Marroquin — mixing
- Nathan Dantzler — mastering
- Mike Griffith — production coordinator

== Charts ==
=== Weekly charts ===
Chart (2021)	Peak position
US Billboard 200	71
US Top Country Albums (Billboard)	11

=== Year-end charts ===
Chart (2022)	Position
US Top Country Albums (Billboard)	48
