= Chasing After You =

Single by Ryan Hurd and Maren Morris

from the album Pelago
- Released: February 12, 2021
- Length: 3:27
- Label: RCA Nashville
- Songwriters: Brinley Addington; Jerry Flowers
- Producers: Teddy Reimer; Aaron Eshuis

Ryan Hurd singles chronology
"Every Other Memory" (2020)	"Chasing After You" (2021)	"Pass It On" (2022)

Maren Morris singles chronology
"Line by Line" (2021)	"Chasing After You" (2021)	"Bigger Man" (2021)

Music video
- "Chasing After You" on YouTube

"Chasing After You" is a song by American singers Ryan Hurd and Maren Morris. It was released on February 12, 2021, as the lead single from Hurd's debut studio album, Pelago. The song was written by Brinley Addington and Jerry Flowers and produced by Teddy Reimer and Aaron Eshuis. It peaked at number two on the Country Airplay chart that November.

== Background ==
Hurd said in a statement: "This is the first time we've gotten to do an actual duet together. It feels like the timing is really perfect and it's a full circle moment to get to make music together in this way."

== Content ==
"Chasing After You" is the couple's first duet, with the lyrics telling a love story between Hurd and Morris.

== Charts ==
=== Weekly charts ===
Weekly chart performance for "Chasing After You"
Chart (2021)	Peak position
Canada Hot 100 (Billboard)	61
Canada Country (Billboard)	5
Global 200 (Billboard)	118
New Zealand Hot Singles (RMNZ)	39
US Billboard Hot 100	23
US Country Airplay (Billboard)	2
US Hot Country Songs (Billboard)	3

=== Year-end charts ===
Year-end chart performance for "Chasing After You"
Chart (2021)	Position
US Billboard Hot 100	61
US Country Airplay (Billboard)	38
US Hot Country Songs (Billboard)	7

2022 year-end chart performance for "Chasing After You"
Chart (2022)	Position
US Hot Country Songs (Billboard)	79

== Certifications ==
Region	Certification	Certified units/sales
United States (RIAA)	2× Platinum	2,000,000^{‡}
^{‡} Sales+streaming figures based on certification alone.
