= Dear Hate =

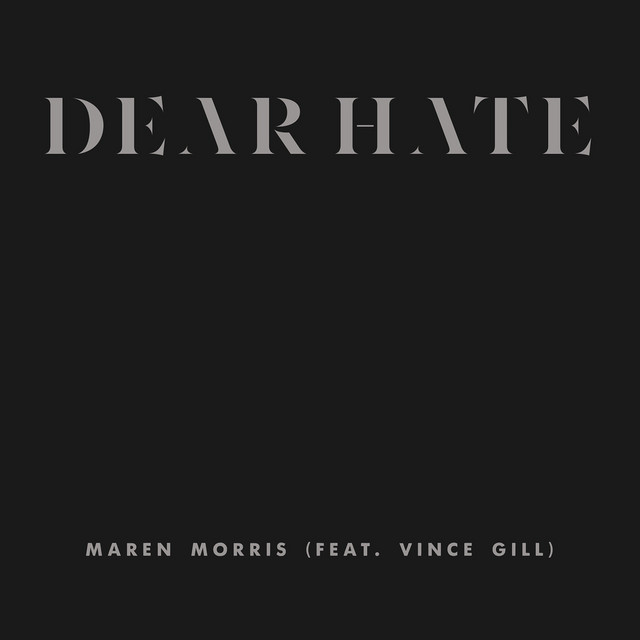

Promotional single by Maren Morris and Vince Gill
- Released: October 4, 2017
- Genre: Country
- Length: 3:41
- Label: Columbia
- Songwriters: David Hodges; Tom Douglas; Maren Morris
- Producers: Brad Hill; Maren Morris

Maren Morris promotional singles chronology
"Dear Hate" (2017)	"Common" (2019)

Audio video
- "Dear Hate" on YouTube

"Dear Hate" is a song by American country music singers Maren Morris and Vince Gill. Morris released the song in 2017 as a response to the 2017 Las Vegas shooting.

== History ==
Maren Morris released "Dear Hate" on October 4, 2017, in response to the 2017 Las Vegas shooting. All proceeds from the single were donated to the Music City Cares fund.

Brittney McKenna of NPR's blog Songs We Love wrote that the " song functions as an epistolary conversation with hatred itself, introducing hate as a figure 'on the news today' with the ability to 'poison any mind.'" She contrasted the message with Eric Church's "Kill a Word" and Tim McGraw's "Humble and Kind".

The song was nominated in 2019 for a Grammy Award for Best Country Duo/Group Performance.

== Chart performance ==
Weekly chart performance for "Dear Hate"
Chart (2017)	Peak position
Canada Country (Billboard)	39
US Billboard Hot 100	91
US Country Airplay (Billboard)	29
US Hot Country Songs (Billboard)	18
