= Threads (Sheryl Crow album) =

Studio album by Sheryl Crow
- Released: August 30, 2019
- Recorded: 2016–2019
- Studio: Arlyn (Austin, Texas); Capitol (Los Angeles, California); Chicago Recording Company (Chicago, Illinois); Old Green Barn (Nashville, Tennessee); Sphere (Burbank, California); Village Recorders (Los Angeles, California; Studio D Recording (Sausalito, California)
- Genre: Heartland rock; country rock; folk rock; blues rock; Americana
- Length: 74:45
- Label: Big Machine
- Producer: Steve Jordan; Sheryl Crow; Jeff Trott

Sheryl Crow chronology
Be Myself (2017)	Threads (2019)	Evolution (2024)

Singles from Threads
- 1. "Redemption Day" Released: April 21, 2019; 2. "Live Wire" Released: May 24, 2019; 3. "Prove You Wrong" Released: June 5, 2019; 4. "Still the Good Old Days" Released: June 14, 2019; 5. "Everything Is Broken" Released: July 12, 2019; 6. "Tell Me When It's Over" Released: August 2, 2019; 7. "Story of Everything" Released: August 23, 2019

Threads is the eleventh studio album by American singer-songwriter Sheryl Crow. The album was released on August 30, 2019, by Big Machine Records. Threads is a collaborative album featuring many of Crow's musical friends, heroes and newer artists. Crow had initially stated that Threads would possibly be her final album to instead focus on releasing individual tracks; however, this statement was retracted in 2023 upon the announcement of her following album Evolution (2024). The album reached number 30 on the Billboard 200 albums chart in the US.

== Promotion ==
While promoting her 2018 UK tour, Crow released "Wouldn't Wanna Be Like You" featuring St. Vincent and revealed that the duets project will possibly be her final album, citing the impossibility of releasing something that could follow up such a gathering of artists. She added that she will continue to write and tour and will potentially release short-form music akin to extended plays.

"Redemption Day" was released as the album's lead single on April 21, 2019. First appearing on Crow's self-titled second album in 1996, the Threads version of the song features Johnny Cash, who had recorded a cover of the song for his 2010 posthumous release American VI: Ain't No Grave.

On May 22, 2019, "Live Wire", a blues-inspired track featuring Bonnie Raitt and Mavis Staples, was released on Entertainment Weekly. Crow, Raitt and Staples subsequently performed the song on The Ellen DeGeneres Show.

"Prove You Wrong", featuring Crow's long-time friend Stevie Nicks and rising country star Maren Morris, was released on June 5, 2019. Crow joined Morris onstage at the 2019 CMT Music Awards to perform the song.

On June 14, 2019, Crow released the rock track "Still the Good Old Days" featuring Joe Walsh. She performed the song that night on The Graham Norton Show.

On June 28, 2019, Crow promoted Threads by performing "Prove You Wrong" and "Still the Good Old Days" during her set on the Pyramid Stage at the Glastonbury Festival.

"Everything Is Broken", a roots rock Bob Dylan cover featuring Jason Isbell was released on July 12, 2019. On September 10, 2019, Crow was joined by Isbell on The Tonight Show With Jimmy Fallon where the pair performed the track live for the first time.

On August 2, 2019, "Tell Me When It's Over", a bluesy breakup song was released which was co-written and features backing vocals by Chris Stapleton. On September 20, 2019, Crow and Stapleton performed the song on The Tonight Show.

The funk-infused track "Story of Everything" that includes a rap by Chuck D, guitar playing by Gary Clark Jr. and vocals by Andra Day was released on August 23, 2019, and focuses on the current state of America, in particular, the racial issues that still divide the country.

== Commercial performance ==
Threads debuted on Billboard's Top Country Albums at No. 2 with 15,000 equivalent album units, of which 14,000 are in traditional sales. The album had sold 49,200 pure copies in the United States as of March 2020.

== Track listing ==
The official track listing for the album was announced on June 14, 2019. Crow wrote or co-wrote all twelve of the album's original tracks, as well as "Redemption Day", which had previously appeared on her 1996 release Sheryl Crow. Additionally, the album includes four covers.

No.	Title	Writer(s)	Collaborators	Length
1.	"Prove You Wrong"	Sheryl Crow, Al Anderson, Leslie Satcher	Stevie Nicks and Maren Morris	3:41
2.	"Live Wire"	Crow, Jeff Trott	Bonnie Raitt and Mavis Staples	5:09
3.	"Tell Me When It's Over"	Crow, Stapleton	Chris Stapleton	4:56
4.	"Story of Everything"	Crow, Steve Jordan, Carlton Ridenhour	Chuck D, Andra Day and Gary Clark Jr.	6:22
5.	"Beware of Darkness"	George Harrison	Eric Clapton, Sting and Brandi Carlile	3:38
6.	"Redemption Day"	Crow	Johnny Cash	4:46
7.	"Cross Creek Road"	Crow, Trott	Neil Young and Lukas Nelson (digital/physical) or Margo Price (vinyl) and Don Henley (backing vocals)	4:46
8.	"Everything Is Broken"	Bob Dylan	Jason Isbell	4:32
9.	"The Worst"	Mick Jagger, Keith Richards	Keith Richards	2:38
10.	"Lonely Alone"	Crow, Shane McAnally	Willie Nelson	4:37
11.	"Border Lord"	Stephen Bruton, Donnie Fritts, Kristofferson, Terry Paul	Kris Kristofferson	4:42
12.	"Still the Good Old Days"	Crow, Walsh	Joe Walsh	5:17
13.	"Wouldn't Want to Be Like You"	Crow, Trott	St. Vincent	3:35
14.	"Don't"	Crow	Lucius	4:06
15.	"Nobody's Perfect"	Crow, Trott	Emmylou Harris	4:43
16.	"Flying Blind"	Crow, Stapleton	James Taylor	3:41
17.	"For the Sake of Love"	Crow	Vince Gill	3:34
Total length:				1:14:43

== Charts ==
=== Weekly charts ===
Chart (2019)	Peak position
Australian Albums (ARIA)	73
Australian Country Albums (ARIA)	3
Austrian Albums (Ö3 Austria)	34
Belgian Albums (Ultratop Flanders)	39
Belgian Albums (Ultratop Wallonia)	38
Canadian Albums (Billboard)	31
Dutch Albums (Album Top 100)	67
French Albums (SNEP)	165
German Albums (Offizielle Top 100)	25
Japanese Albums (Oricon)	59
Scottish Albums (OCC)	6
Swiss Albums (Schweizer Hitparade)	9
UK Albums (OCC)	10
UK Country Albums (OCC)	1
US Billboard 200	30
US Top Country Albums (Billboard)	2

=== Year-end charts ===
Chart (2019)	Position
US Top Country Albums (Billboard)	99
