= Girl (Maren Morris album) =

2019 studio album by Maren Morris

Studio album by Maren Morris
- Released: March 8, 2019
- Recorded: 2017–2019
- Studios: Sound Emporium (Nashville, Tennessee); Echo (Los Angeles, California)
- Genre: Country pop
- Length: 46:59
- Label: Columbia Nashville
- Producers: Busbee; Maren Morris; Greg Kurstin

Maren Morris chronology
Hero (2016)	Girl (2019)	Maren Morris: Reimagined (2019)

Singles from Girl
- 1. "Girl" Released: January 18, 2019; 2. "The Bones" Released: May 20, 2019; 3. "To Hell & Back" Released: March 30, 2020

Girl (stylized in all caps) is the second studio album by American country music singer Maren Morris. It was released on March 8, 2019, through Columbia Nashville. Preceded by the lead single "Girl", the album's pre-order became available alongside the promotional single "Common", featuring Brandi Carlile, on February 8. It was later nominated for Best Country Duo/Group Performance at the 62nd Annual Grammy Awards, while the album's second single "The Bones" was nominated for Best Country Song at the 63rd Annual Grammy Awards. Morris embarked on the Girl: The World Tour in support of the album.

== Release and promotion ==
Morris teased the lead single of Girl on January 16, 2019. Its title was "Girl", serving as the album's title track; the song was released a day later. On February 8, Columbia Records released the album's first promotional single, "Common", featuring Brandi Carlile. The collaboration was nominated for Best Country Duo/Group Performance at the 62nd Annual Grammy Awards. "The Bones" was released as the second single on February 22; it was sent to the radio stations on August 26. The song's music video was directed by her husband, Ryan Hurd. It peaked at number 12 on the Billboard Hot 100, being Morris' highest charting solo single to date. The track also charted at number one on the Country Airplay chart of February 2020; it became her fourth number one in the chart. It additionally spent 19 weeks atop the Hot Country Songs chart, ranking as the second-longest-running number-one by an unaccompanied solo female artist in the chart's history. At the 63rd Annual Grammy Awards, "The Bones" received a nomination for Best Country Song. In March 2020, she released "To Hell & Back" as the third single from the album.

In support of the album, Morris embarked on the Girl: The World Tour, which began on March 9 and concluded on November 16, 2019.

== Critical reception ==
Professional ratings
Aggregate scores
Source	Rating
Metacritic	66/100
Review scores
Source	Rating
AllMusic	3.5/5 stars
Exclaim!	8/10
The Guardian	2/5 stars
The New York Times	50/100
Paste	7.1/10
Pitchfork	6.3/10
Rolling Stone	3.5/5 stars
Variety	88/100

Girl received generally positive reviews from music critics. At Metacritic, which assigns a normalized rating out of 100 to reviews from mainstream critics, the album received an average score of 66, based on 8 reviews.

Several critics praised Morris' vocal growth, confidence, and increased clarity as an artist. Melissa Novacaska of Exclaim! wrote that "what's impressive about Girl though is how strong Morris's vocals have grown, along with the maturity and uniqueness of each song", and argued that the album was "not a sophomore slump, but rather an album worth investing in". Writing for AllMusic, Stephen Thomas Erlewine described the record as "bright, shiny, and big". He noted its "pan-cultural pop" approach and polished production, while presenting Morris as an assured and accessible artist, even as he felt its songwriting left "less room for interpretation" than its execution. Ellen Johnson of Paste characterized Girl as an earnest and polished country-pop album that remains "down-to-earth", positioning it as an antithesis to contemporary "country-rap" trends and portraying Morris as a self-aware and strategically confident artist.

Other reviewers focused on the album's genre identity and its departure from Morris' earlier work. Writing for Variety, Chris Willman argued that Girl is "far country-er than anything that appeared on Hero", while also situating the album within a "post-Spotify world where kids don't look at genre classifications". Willman contrasted Girl with its predecessor; he described Hero as a "mostly cheerful-sounding heartbreak album", whereas Girl is "across-the-board cheerful", drawing parallels to Kacey Musgraves' stylistic shift on Golden Hour while noting that Morris' album embraces a more unabashedly Top 40 approach. Rob Sheffield of Rolling Stone wrote that fans drawn to her "scrappy attitude" on Hero might be put off by Girl's "happy midtempo love songs", concluding that "the liveliest moments come when she gets out of line". Katherine from Pitchfork argued that while Morris proves herself to be "a powerhouse talent", much of Girl feels like "stifling repertoire", and it excels across multiple styles without fully committing to any single one and questions the artistic identity Morris ultimately seeks to inhabit.

Laura Snapes of The Guardian contended that Girl avoids both "gutsy grandstanding" and overt pop spectacle; Snapes criticized what she described as unconvincing "biographical sincerity" and the underutilization of Morris' "compellingly hardbitten voice" on material, which strays from fractured romance narratives.

=== Awards and nominations ===
List of awards and nominations
Year	Organization	Category	Result	Ref.
2019	Country Music Association Awards	Album of the Year	Won	
2020	Academy of Country Music Awards	Album of the Year	Nominated	
2020	Billboard Music Awards	Top Country Album	Nominated	

== Commercial performance ==
Girl debuted and peaked at number four on the US Billboard 200 with 46,000 album-equivalent units, of which 25,000 were pure album sales in its first week. It is Morris' second US top-five album. The album broke the record for the largest streaming week ever for a country studio album by a woman, with approximately 24 million streams in its first week. On February 26, 2020, the album was certified gold by the Recording Industry Association of America (RIAA) for combined sales and album-equivalent units of over 500,000 units. The album has sold 91,000 in traditional albums, and has earned at least 636,000 equivalent album units as of April 2020.

== Track listing ==
Standard edition
No.	Title	Writer(s)	Producer(s)	Length
1.	"Girl"	Maren Morris; Greg Kurstin; Sarah Aarons	Kurstin	4:10
2.	"The Feels"	Morris; Jimmy Robbins; Laura Veltz	Morris; busbee	3:07
3.	"All My Favorite People" (featuring Brothers Osborne)	Morris; Ryan Hurd; Mikey Reaves	Morris; busbee	3:19
4.	"A Song for Everything"	Morris; Robbins; Veltz	Morris; busbee	3:14
5.	"Common" (featuring Brandi Carlile)	Morris; Kurstin; Aarons	Kurstin	4:05
6.	"Flavor"	Morris; Robbins; Veltz	Morris; busbee	3:16
7.	"Make Out with Me"	Morris; Julian Bunetta; John Ryan	Morris; busbee	2:16
8.	"Gold Love"	Morris; busbee	Morris; busbee	3:23
9.	"Great Ones"	Morris; Hurd; Reaves	Morris; busbee	3:41
10.	"RSVP"	Morris; Natalie Hemby; Jon Randall; Mark Trussell	Morris; busbee	3:34
11.	"To Hell & Back"	Morris; Jessie Jo Dillon; Veltz	Morris; busbee	3:15
12.	"The Bones"	Morris; Robbins; Veltz	Kurstin	3:17
13.	"Good Woman"	Morris; Kathleen Edwards; Ian Fitchuk	Morris; busbee	3:31
14.	"Shade"	Morris; Hemby; Tyler Johnson	Morris; busbee	2:51
Total length:				46:59

2020 rerelease
No.	Title	Writer(s)	Producer(s)	Length
15.	"Just for Now"	Morris; busbee	Morris; busbee	4:00
16.	"Takes Two"	Morris; Aarons; Kurstin	Morris; Kurstin	3:33
Total length:				54:32

== Credits and personnel ==
Credits were adapted from the liner notes.

Recording locations

- Sound Emporium; Nashville, Tennessee (2–4, 6–11, 13–14)
- Echo Studio; Los Angeles, California (1, 5, 12)

Musicians

- Charlie Bisharat – violin
- Jacob Braun – cello
- busbee – percussion, programming, bass guitar, keyboards, piano, Hammond B-3 organ, synthesizer, electric guitar
- Brandi Carlile – duet vocals (track 5)
- Kathleen Edwards – background vocals (track 13)
- Alma Fernandez – viola
- Ian Fitchuk – piano, Hammond B-3 organ, synthesizer, percussion
- Natalie Hemby – background vocals (track 14)
- Ryan Hurd – background vocals (tracks 3, 9, 12)
- Greg Kurstin – drums, percussion, bass guitar, piano, keyboards, synthesizer, organ, omnichord
- Songa Lee – violin
- Rob Moose – violin, viola, octave viola
- Maren Morris – lead vocals, background vocals
- John Osborne – electric guitar
- T.J. Osborne – duet vocals (track 3)
- Aaron Sterling – drums, percussion, programming
- Laura Veltz – background vocals (tracks 4, 11, 12)
- Patrick Warren – string arrangement (tracks 7, 13)
- Derek Wells – acoustic guitar, electric guitar, mandolin
- Ben West – Hammond B-3 organ, synthesizer

Technical

- Julian Burg – recording
- busbee – producer (all tracks except 1, 5, 12), recording, mixing
- Maren Morris – producer (all tracks except 1, 5, 12)
- Dave Clauss – digital editing, recording, mixing
- Michael Freeman – assistant engineer
- Mike "Frog" Griffith – production coordination
- Greg Kurstin – producer (tracks 1, 5, 12), recording, mixing
- Rachel Kurstin – production coordination
- Randy Merrill – mastering
- Rob Moose – recording
- Maren Morris – producer
- Zack Pancoast – assistant engineer
- Alex Pasco – recording
- Nathan Spicer – recording
- Mark "Spike" Stent – mixing
- Matt Tuggle – production assistant (track 5)
- Brian David Willis – digital editing

Imagery

- Marwa Bashir – hair
- Samuel Burgess-Johnson – Maren Morris font design
- Joseph Cassell – styling
- Tracy Fleaner – creative director
- Nicki Fletcher – cover design
- Jamie Nelson – photography
- Lorrie Turk – makeup

== Charts ==
=== Weekly charts ===
Chart (2019)	Peak position
Australian Albums (ARIA)	29
Canadian Albums (Billboard)	14
Scottish Albums (Official Charts)	22
UK Albums (Official Charts)	72
US Billboard 200	4
US Top Country Albums (Billboard)	1
US Digital Albums (Billboard)	2
US Top Album Sales (Billboard)	2

=== Year-end charts ===
Chart (2019)	Position
US Billboard 200	105
US Top Country Albums (Billboard)	10
Chart (2020)	Position
US Billboard 200	83
US Top Country Albums (Billboard)	7
Chart (2021)	Position
US Top Country Albums (Billboard)	52

== Certifications ==
Region	Certification	Certified units/sales
Canada (Music Canada)	Platinum	80,000^{‡}
New Zealand (RMNZ)	Gold	7,500^{‡}
United States (RIAA)	Gold	636,000
^{‡} Sales+streaming figures based on certification alone.

== Release history ==
Region	Date	Format	Label	Ref.
Various	March 8, 2019	Digital download; streaming	Columbia Nashville	
