= Line by Line (song) =

Single by JP Saxe featuring Maren Morris

from the album Dangerous Levels of Introspection
- Released: January 13, 2021
- Length: 3:28
- Label: Arista
- Songwriters: JP Saxe; Jimmy Robbins; Maren Morris; Ryan Marrone
- Producer: Ryan Marrone

JP Saxe singles chronology
"Kissin' in the Cold" (2020)	"Line by Line" (2021)	"Like That" (2021)

Maren Morris singles chronology
"To Hell & Back" (2020)	"Line by Line" (2021)	"Chasing After You" (2021)

Music video
- "Line by Line" on YouTube

"Line by Line" is a song by Canadian singer JP Saxe featuring American singer Maren Morris. It was released on January 13, 2021, as the third single of Saxe's debut studio album, Dangerous Levels of Introspection (2021). The collaboration came after Saxe publicly expressed his admiration for Morris's songwriting on social media, leading the pair to write the song together.

"Line by Line" explores the relationship between an artist and their muse, with Saxe and Morris reflecting on the limitations of songwriting as a means of expressing love. A love ballad, it features the pair harmonising throughout its chorus and was accompanied by a music video upon release.

== Background ==
Saxe said he had wanted to work with Morris "for a long time" because of her reputation as a songwriter. After expressing his admiration for her on Twitter, Morris responded that she enjoyed his music as well. The two subsequently met in the studio, where they wrote "Line by Line" during their second day of writing together. Morris recalled that writing with Saxe was "the most fluid, inspiring session", praising him as "a lyrical faucet", and said they completed and recorded the song in about an hour.

Saxe described "Line by Line" as a reflection on the limitations of songwriting; he explained that while songwriters try to "bottle up a feeling into a song", life's "biggest feelings" are too "complicated" and "messy" to be fully captured. Saxe said it recognises that "one song just isn't enough" but embraces the desire to "keep writing, futilely and lovingly, anyway". Morris said the song—describing it as "a promise" that she would "never be done writing" about her muse because he "can't be summed up in one song"—explores the relationship between an artist and their muse.

Speaking to Apple Music's Zane Lowe, Saxe noted that both he and Morris were in relationships with fellow songwriters, which allowed them to make their "best attempt" at expressing "how big love can be" through the song. Morris similarly felt that their shared experiences made "Line by Line" "something that only [they] could write", describing it as "a love song about a song".

== Composition ==
"Line by Line" was written by Saxe, Morris, Jimmy Robbins, and Ryan Marrone, and produced by Marrone. Saxe and Morris perform the lead vocals, while Saxe and Robbins play guitar. Marrone also contributed synthesiser and served as a recording engineer alongside Robbins, who additionally acted as assistant producer. Aaron Sterling played drums. The song was mixed by Josh Gudwin, mastered by Joe LaPorta, and assisted by engineer Dylan Waterhouse.

"Line by Line" is a love ballad that finds inspiration in a romantic partner. Saxe and Morris harmonise throughout the chorus, where Morris sings "I'll be writing about you for the rest of my life".

== Release and promotion ==
Morris first teased "Line by Line" via her Twitter account on September 3, 2020, stating that she was writing it with Saxe for "all week". On January 11, 2021, Saxe confirmed the release date of the song, and it was released two days later via Arista Records. The accompanying music video for "Line by Line" was unveiled along with the song's release. On June 29, Saxe and Morris performed the song at the 2021 CMT Music Awards.

== Personnel ==
Credits were adapted from Tidal.

- JP Saxe – lead vocals, guitar, songwriter
- Maren Morris – lead vocals, songwriter
- Ryan Marrone – producer, songwriter, synthesiser, recording engineer
- Jimmy Robbins – songwriter, assistant producer, guitar, recording engineer
- Aaron Sterling – drums
- Josh Gudwin – mixing engineer
- Joe LaPorta – mastering engineer
- Dylan Waterhouse – assistant engineer

== Charts ==
Weekly chart performance
Chart (2021)	Peak position
Canada Hot 100 (Billboard)	96
