= Common (song) =

Promotional single by Maren Morris featuring Brandi Carlile

from the album Girl
- Released: February 8, 2019
- Length: 4:06
- Label: Columbia
- Songwriters: Greg Kurstin; Maren Morris; Sarah Aarons
- Producer: Greg Kurstin

Maren Morris promotional singles chronology
| "Dear Hate" (2017) | "Common" (2019) | "Kingdom of One" (2019) |

Audio video
- "Common" on YouTube

"Common" is a song by American singers Maren Morris and Brandi Carlile, who appears as a featured artist. It was released on February 8, 2019, as the first promotional single of Morris's second studio album, Girl (2019). Written by Morris, Greg Kurstin, and Sarah Aarons, the song is a pop-influenced track that addresses shared humanity and social division through a duet between Morris and Carlile. "Common" was praised by critics for its message and vocal performances, reaching at number 49 on the US Hot Country Songs chart. The song was promoted with live performances and a behind-the-scenes video documenting its recording.

== Background and release ==
"Common" was written by Morris, Greg Kurstin, and Sarah Aarons during a songwriting session in Los Angeles. After returning home, Morris decided to invite Brandi Carlile to record the song as a duet after receiving a letter and a copy of Carlile's album By the Way, I Forgive You. Carlile recorded her vocals separately with Kurstin in Los Angeles while Morris joined the session via FaceTime. The track was released on February 8, 2019, serving as the fifth track of Morris's second studio album, Girl.

Morris said "Common" was released ahead of the 61st Annual Grammy Awards to coincide with the nominations received by herself, Carlile, and Aarons, describing it as "a fun celebration to put this song out for the pre-order of [Girl]".

== Composition ==
"Common" incorporates influences of pop, featuring somber piano sounds with layered vocal harmonies. Lyrically, it balances hopelessness with hope and addresses social division. The lyrics suggest responsibility for resolving that extends to everyone, including those privileged. According to Jon Freeman of Rolling Stone, "Common" pairs sparse synthesizers with an "uplifting" beat as Morris and Carlile alternate verses before joining in the chorus. He wrote that the song takes "a more somber, alienated look at human relations" and concludes by emphasizing the similarities between people.

== Promotion ==
Morris debuted "Common" at Carlile's Girls Just Wanna Weekend festival in Mexico on February 3, 2019. They performed the song for the second time at the Ryman Auditorium in Nashville on March 13. Two days later, a making-of video for "Common" was released; it documents Morris and Carlile recording the duet in the studio before performing it live for the first time at Girls Just Wanna Weekend festival. The video concludes with the two embracing after the performance.

On March 29, Morris and American singer JoJo dueted "Common" on a stage at Wiltern in Los Angeles, Calif. Calling the song "brotherhood-of-man anthem", Variety's Chris Willman noted JoJo's verse as "an unlikely but vocally capable ringer for Carlile". On June 10, Morris performed the track with Carlile at the CMA Music Festival, which held at Nissan Stadium in Nashville Sunday.

== Critical reception ==
Lauryn Snapp of iHeartRadio described "Common" as a "feel-good track". The Boot's Angela Stefano chose the song as one of the five songs essential on Girl, describing them as "especially worthwhile". In a poll held by Taste of Country, the song's video ranked 11th at their Best Country Video of the Week, earning 0.27 percents.

== Personnel ==
Credits were adapted from Tidal.

- Maren Morris – lead vocals, songwriter
- Brandi Carlile – featured vocals
- Greg Kurstin – producer, songwriter, recording engineer, bass, drums, guitar, keyboards, organ, percussion, piano, synthesizer
- Sarah Aarons – songwriter
- Alex Pasco – recording engineer
- Julian Burg – recording engineer
- Matt Tuggle – assistant engineer
- Michael Freeman – assistant engineer
- Mark "Spike" Stent – mixing engineer
- Randy Merrill – mastering engineer
- Jacob Braun – cello
- Alma Fernandez – viola
- Charlie Bisharat – violin
- Songa Lee – violin

== Charts ==
Weekly chart performance
| Chart (2019) | Peak position |
|---|---|
| US Hot Country Songs (Billboard) | 49 |
