= The Bones (song) =

2019 single by Maren Morris

Single by Maren Morris

from the album Girl
- Released: February 22, 2019
- Genre: Pop
- Length: 3:17
- Label: Columbia Nashville
- Songwriters: Maren Morris; Jimmy Robbins; Laura Veltz
- Producer: Greg Kurstin

Maren Morris singles chronology
"Girl" (2019)	"The Bones" (2019)	"Prove You Wrong" (2019)

Hozier singles chronology
"Dinner & Diatribes" (2019)	"The Bones" (remix) (2019)	"Jackboot Jump" (2019)

Alternative cover
- Original cover artwork

Music video
- "The Bones" on YouTube

"The Bones" is a song by American singer Maren Morris. It was released by Columbia Nashville on February 22, 2019, as the second single from her second studio album, Girl (2019). Morris co-wrote the song with Jimmy Robbins and Laura Veltz, while production was handled by Greg Kurstin. It was serviced to hot adult contemporary radio on May 20, 2019.

A sleeper hit, "The Bones" peaked at number 12 on the US Billboard Hot 100 on the following year of its release, spending 52 weeks on the chart. It became the second-most successful country song of 2020 in the United States. The song has also received quadruple platinum certification by the Recording Industry Association of America (RIAA) and septuple platinum certification by Music Canada (MC).

"The Bones" was nominated at the 63rd Grammy Awards for Best Country Song, earning Morris her twelfth nomination. The single won two Country Music Association awards (one for single of the year 2020 and one for song of the year 2020) and one Academy of Country Music award (for song of the year 2021).

== Critical reception ==
Jason Fontelieu of The Diamondback praised the songwriting behind "The Bones" and in a review of its parent album wrote that "despite a clumsy midsection, Girl finishes strong with "The Bones" near the end of the album." Billy Dukes of Taste of Country called the song "a soulful pop anthem with a hint of country thrown in for good measure".

== Commercial performance ==
In the United States, "The Bones" debuted at number 34 on the Hot Country Songs chart dated March 9, 2019, and later debuted at number 57 on the Country Airplay chart dated August 31, after being released to country radio. It then peaked atop the Country Airplay chart on February 15, 2020, becoming Morris's fourth number one single on the chart as well as the first solo song by a female country artist to reach the top 10 of the Billboard Radio Songs chart since Taylor Swift's "You Belong with Me". "The Bones" spent a second week at the top; it became her first multi-week number one single and made her the first solo female artist to chart a multi-week number one since Carrie Underwood's "Blown Away" spent two weeks at the top in late 2012.

Reaching number one in its 53rd week on the Hot Country Songs chart dated March 14, 2020, "The Bones" became Morris's first song to top that chart, as well as making for the second slowest climb to number one on that chart. Furthermore, it made Morris the first solo female artist to top that chart since Kelsea Ballerini's "Peter Pan" in October 2016. On the chart dated May 23, 2020, it charted its 11th week at number one, passing Swift's "We Are Never Ever Getting Back Together", which spent 10 weeks at number one in October 2012, as the longest-lasting number one by a solo female on that chart. It ultimately spent 19 weeks at number one before being replaced by Gabby Barrett's "I Hope", making it the first time since 2011 that two back-to-back solo women topped the Hot Country Songs chart. The song has crossed over to pop and rock radio, becoming Morris's first single to appear on the Adult Alternative Songs chart, where it has peaked at number 17.

Morris's highest charting solo song on the US Billboard Hot 100 so far by peaking at number 12, it also placed at number 9 on the year-end list for 2020, which is the first time that a song had not reached the top 10 of the Hot 100 but instead reached the top 10 of the year-end list since "I Don't Want to Wait" by Paula Cole in 1998. "The Bones" charted for 52 weeks on the Hot 100 as of September 26, 2020, becoming the 74th song to spend at least 52 weeks on the chart.

"The Bones" was certified Gold by the RIAA on July 17, 2019, for 500,000 units in combined sales and streams. The song has sold 195,000 copies in the United States as of March 2020. The song has also been certified 7× Platinum by Music Canada as of July 2022.

== Music video ==
The music video for "The Bones" premiered on August 15, 2019. It was directed by Alex Ferrari and shows footage of Morris while on vacation in Maui, Hawaii with her then-husband, Ryan Hurd, all shot on vintage Super 8 film.

A video for the remix premiered on October 23 and features a time lapse of artist Sydney Clawson drawing both artists on canvas.

== Awards and nominations ==
Year	Organization	Category	Result
2020	iHeartRadio Music Awards	Best Lyrics	Nominated
2020	iHeartRadio Music Awards	Best Remix	Nominated
2020	Country Music Association Awards	Single of the Year	Won
2020	Country Music Association Awards	Song of the Year	Won
2020	Country Music Association Awards	Musical Event of the Year (with Hozier)	Nominated
2020	Billboard Music Awards	Top Country Song	Nominated
2020	British Country Music Association Awards	International Song of the Year	Nominated
2020	American Music Awards	Favorite Song – Country	Nominated
2021	Grammy Awards	Best Country Song	Nominated
2021	Academy of Country Music Awards	Single of the Year	Nominated
2021	Academy of Country Music Awards	Song of the Year	Won

== Charts ==
=== Weekly charts ===
Chart (2019–2020)	Peak position
Canada Hot 100 (Billboard)	45
Canada AC (Billboard)	4
Canada CHR/Top 40 (Billboard)	5
Canada Hot AC (Billboard)	28
Canada Country (Billboard)	1
Iceland (Tónlistinn)	26
Ireland (IRMA)	63
Lithuania (AGATA)	60
US Billboard Hot 100	12
US Adult Alternative Airplay (Billboard)	17
US Adult Contemporary (Billboard)	1
US Adult Pop Airplay (Billboard)	1
US Hot Country Songs (Billboard)	1
US Country Airplay (Billboard)	1
US Pop Airplay (Billboard)	13
US Rolling Stone Top 100	23

=== Year-end charts ===
Chart (2019)	Position
US Adult Top 40 (Billboard)	27
US Hot Country Songs (Billboard)	25

Chart (2020)	Position
US Billboard Hot 100	9
US Adult Contemporary (Billboard)	4
US Adult Top 40 (Billboard)	7
US Country Airplay (Billboard)	20
US Hot Country Songs (Billboard)	2
US Mainstream Top 40 (Billboard)	42

Chart (2021)	Position
US Adult Contemporary (Billboard)	44

== Certifications ==
Region	Certification	Certified units/sales
Australia (ARIA)	Gold	35,000^{‡}
Canada (Music Canada)	7× Platinum	560,000^{‡}
New Zealand (RMNZ)	2× Platinum	60,000^{‡}
United Kingdom (BPI)	Gold	400,000^{‡}
United States (RIAA)	4× Platinum	4,000,000^{‡}
^{‡} Sales+streaming figures based on certification alone.

== Release history ==
Region	Date	Format	Version	Label	Ref.
Various	February 22, 2019	Digital download; streaming	Original	Sony Music	
United States	May 20, 2019	Hot adult contemporary	Original	Columbia Records	
United States	August 26, 2019	Country radio	Original	Columbia Nashville	
Various	September 20, 2019	Digital download; streaming	Dave Audé remix	Sony Music	
Various	October 4, 2019	Digital download; streaming	Hozier remix	Sony Music	
United Kingdom	June 26, 2020	Hot adult contemporary	Hozier remix	Sony Music	

== See also ==
- List of Billboard Adult Contemporary number ones of 2020
