= Girl (Maren Morris song) =

2019 single by Maren Morris

Single by Maren Morris

from the album Girl
- Released: January 18, 2019
- Genre: Country pop
- Length: 4:10
- Label: Columbia Nashville
- Songwriters: Maren Morris; Greg Kurstin; Sarah Aarons
- Producer: Greg Kurstin

Maren Morris singles chronology
"Seeing Blind" (2018)	"Girl" (2019)	"The Bones" (2019)

Music video
- "Girl" on YouTube

"Girl" is a song American singer Maren Morris for her album of the same name. Morris co-wrote the song with Sarah Aarons and its producer Greg Kurstin. It was released to American country radio on January 18, 2019, through Columbia Nashville as the album's first single. The song has been certified platinum in the United States and double platinum in Canada.

== Music video ==
The music video for "Girl" was directed by Dave Meyers and premiered on CMT, Great American Country, and Vevo in January 2019. It begins and ends with Morris giving a spoken-word monologue about what it means to be a girl, and is interspersed with footage of Morris performing on stage, and various anonymous women going through hardships in life, as well Morris being critiqued by male music executive.

== Commercial performance ==
"Girl" reached a peak of number one on the US Country Airplay chart dated August 3, 2019. It is her third single to reach the top of the Country Airplay chart and was the first solo female song to lead the chart in over a year, since Kelsea Ballerini's "Legends" in February 2018. The following week, it fell to number 13.

"Girl" was certified Gold by the Recording Industry Association of America (RIAA) on July 17, 2019, and Platinum later the same year on October 10 for one million units in combined sales and streams. It has sold 155,000 copies in the United States as of December 2019.

== Credits and personnel ==
Credits were adapted from Tidal.

- Maren Morris – vocals, backing vocals, songwriter
- Greg Kurstin – producer, songwriter, drums
- Sarah Aarons – songwriter

== Charts ==
=== Weekly charts ===
Chart (2019)	Peak position
Canada Hot 100 (Billboard)	84
Canada Country (Billboard)	5
US Billboard Hot 100	44
US Country Airplay (Billboard)	1
US Hot Country Songs (Billboard)	8
US Rolling Stone Top 100	70

=== Year-end charts ===
Chart (2019)	Position
US Country Airplay (Billboard)	26
US Hot Country Songs (Billboard)	16
US Rolling Stone Top 100	96

== Certifications ==
Region	Certification	Certified units/sales
Canada (Music Canada)	2× Platinum	160,000^{‡}
United States (RIAA)	Platinum	1,000,000^{‡} / 155,000
^{‡} Sales+streaming figures based on certification alone.

== Release history ==
Region	Date	Format	Label	Ref.
Various	January 18, 2019	Digital download; streaming	Columbia Nashville	
