= Ryan Hurd =

American country singer (born 1986)

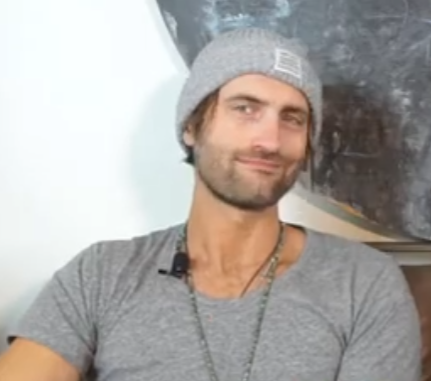
- Hurd in 2019
- Born: Ryan James Hurd; November 2, 1986 (age 40); Chicago, Illinois, U.S.
- Occupations: Singer; songwriter
- Years active: 2016–present
- Spouse: Maren Morris (m. 2018; div. 2024)
- Children: 1
- Musical career
- Genre: Country
- Instruments: Vocals; guitar
- Labels: Sony Music Nashville; Arista Nashville; Big Machine
- Website: ryanhurd.com

Ryan James Hurd (born November 2, 1986) is an American country music singer and songwriter. In addition to writing number one singles for Blake Shelton, Lady A, and Luke Bryan, Hurd has recorded for Sony Music Nashville.

== Career ==
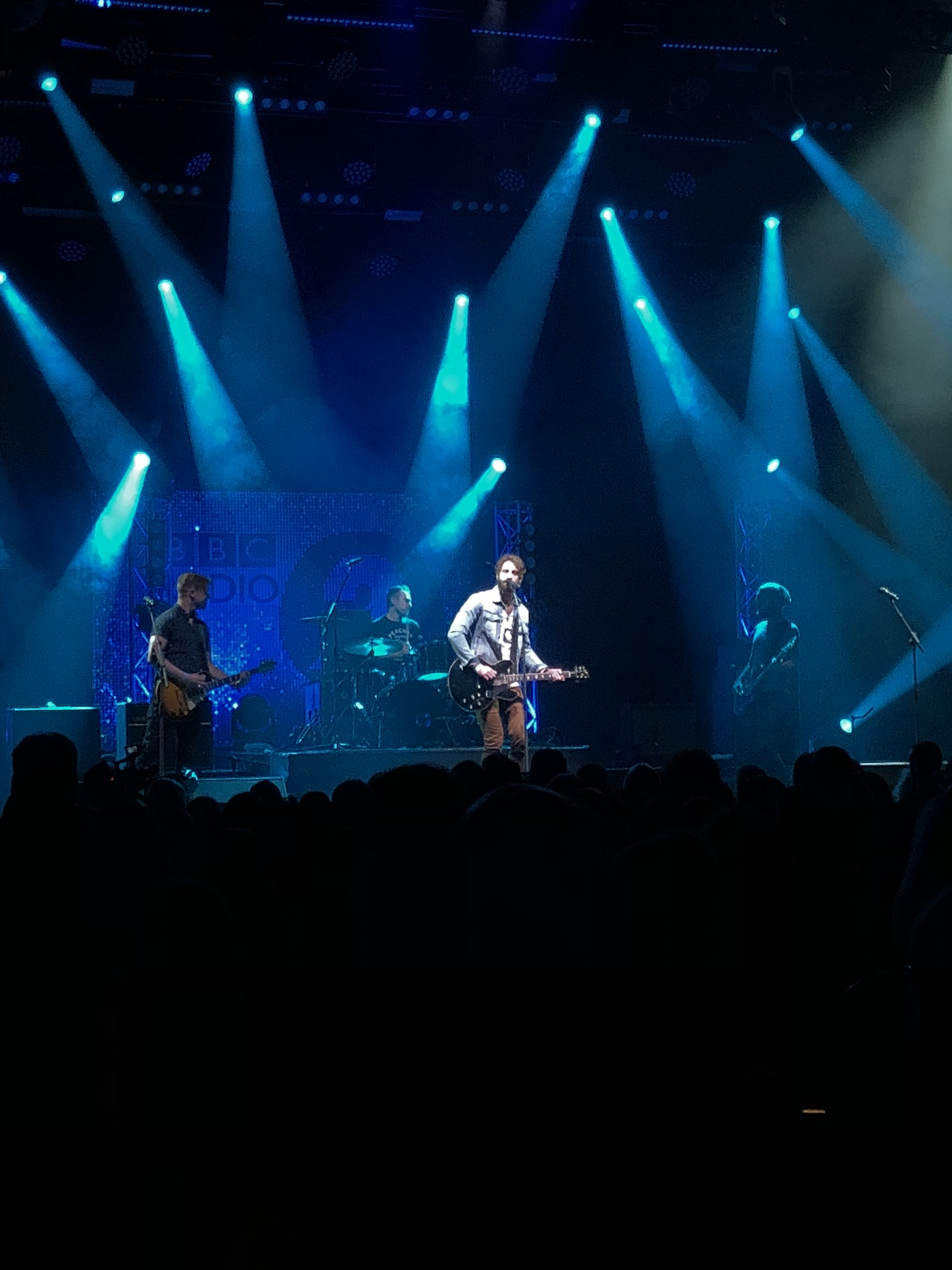
Hurd performing at C2C (Country to Country) in Nashville, 2018

Hurd was born in Chicago and grew up in Kalamazoo, Michigan before moving to Nashville. He met his future wife Maren Morris while writing the ballad “Last Turn Home” for Tim McGraw.

In 2014, Hurd co-wrote the song "Intoxicated" with the band Hinder, the song was released as the third single from their 2015 album When the Smoke Clears and debuted #8 on the US Active Rock Chart. In 2015, he wrote "Lonely Tonight", a No 1 Country Airplay single for Blake Shelton and Ashley Monroe.

Hurd signed with Sony Music Nashville in 2017 to release a forthcoming debut album. His debut single from his self-titled debut EP, "We Do Us" has received over 2 million streams on Spotify. He was featured on Rolling Stone Country's "Artists You Need to Know" list. and CMT named him one of their "Listen Up" Artists of 2016. He has also toured with Chase Rice, Thomas Rhett, Florida Georgia Line, and Morris. Hurd's debut single was "Love in a Bar". In January 2020, Hurd embarked on a tour in support of his Platonic EP with Adam Doleac and Niko Moon.

In 2021, Hurd released his most successful single, "Chasing After You", the first duet he recorded with his wife Maren Morris. The song is his first top 10 hit on the country charts and reached No. 23 on the Hot 100. The song is the lead single from his album Pelago, which was released on October 15, 2021. In early 2024 Hurd covered Taylor Swift’s "Now That We Don’t Talk" noting his admiration for her songwriting.

== Personal life ==
Hurd and Maren Morris were married on March 24, 2018 in Nashville. On March 23, 2020, Morris gave birth to their son. The couple separated in October 2023, with Morris filing for divorce. In January 2024, the couple reached a divorce settlement.

== Discography ==
=== Studio albums ===
List of studio albums, with selected chart positions, showing relevant details
| Title | Album details | Peak chart positions | |
| Title | Album details | US Country | US |
|---|---|---|---|
| Pelago | Released: October 15, 2021; Label: Sony Music Nashville; Formats: CD, download, streaming | 11 | 71 |
| Midwest Rock & Roll | Released: March 21, 2025; Label: Hurd Jamz Records and Tapes; Formats: CD, download, streaming | — | — |

=== Extended plays ===
| Title | Details |
|---|---|
| Panorama | Release date: August 11, 2015; Reissue date: July 19, 2019; Label: Sony Nashville |
| Ryan Hurd | Release date: April 7, 2017; Label: Sony Nashville |
| Platonic | Release date: September 20, 2019; Label: Sony Nashville |
| EOM EP | Release date: June 26, 2020; Label: Sony Nashville |

=== Singles ===
| Year | Single | Peak chart positions | | | | | Sales | Certifications | Album |
| Year | Single | US | US Country | US Country Airplay | CAN Country | NZ Hot | Sales | Certifications | Album |
| 2016 | "We Do Us" | — | — | — | — | — | | | Ryan Hurd |
| 2016 | "Love in a Bar" | — | — | 50 | — | — | | | Ryan Hurd |
| 2016 | "City Girl" | — | — | — | — | — | | | Ryan Hurd |
| 2016 | "Hold You Back" | — | — | — | — | — | | | Ryan Hurd |
| 2018 | "Diamonds or Twine" | — | 22 | — | — | — | | | Pelago |
| 2019 | "To a T" | — | 23 | 22 | 43 | — | US: 61,000 | RIAA: Platinum; MC: Gold | Pelago |
| 2020 | "Every Other Memory" | — | — | 49 | — | — | | | Pelago |
| 2021 | "Chasing After You" (with Maren Morris) | 23 | 3 | 2 | 5 | 39 | | RIAA: 2× Platinum | Pelago |
| 2021 | "Coast" | — | — | — | — | — | | | Pelago |
| 2021 | "June, July, August" | — | — | — | — | — | | | Pelago |
| 2021 | "What Are You Drinking" | — | — | — | — | — | | | Pelago |
| 2022 | "Pass It On" | — | — | 54 | — | — | | | Pelago |
| 2024 | "Breakdown" (with Carly Pearce) | — | — | — | — | — | | | Petty Country: A Country Music Celebration of Tom Petty |
| 2024 | "Lights Out" (with Carter Faith) | — | — | — | — | — | | | Non-album single |
| 2024 | "Midwest Rock & Roll" | — | — | — | — | — | | | Midwest Rock & Roll |
| 2024 | "Go to Bed Sober" (with Sasha Alex Sloan) | — | — | — | — | — | | | Midwest Rock & Roll |
| 2024 | "This Party Sucks" | — | — | — | — | — | | | Midwest Rock & Roll |
| 2024 | "Die for It" | — | — | — | — | — | | | Midwest Rock & Roll |
| 2025 | "Can't Say No" (with Colbie Caillat) | — | — | — | — | — | | | Non-album singles |
| 2025 | "Vindicated" | — | — | — | — | — | | | Non-album singles |
"—" denotes releases that did not chart

=== Music videos ===
| Year | Video | Director | Ref. |
|---|---|---|---|
| 2017 | "Love in a Bar" | Joseph Llanes | |
| 2018 | "Diamonds or Twine" | Alex Ferrari | |
| 2019 | "To a T" | | |
| 2020 | "Every Other Memory" | Blythe Thomas | |
| 2021 | "Chasing After You" (with Maren Morris) | TK McKamy | |
| 2022 | "What Are You Drinking" | | |
