= Laura Veltz =

American songwriter

- Born: Laura Jeanne Veltz
- Origin: New York City, U.S.
- Genre: Country
- Occupations: Songwriter; musician
- Instruments: Vocals; rhythm guitar; accordion; percussion
- Years active: 1996–present

Laura Jeanne Veltz is an American songwriter and musician. She previously was the vocalist and multi-instrumentalist of family pop-rock group Cecilia. She was nominated for the first ever Grammy Award for Songwriter of the Year at the 65th Annual Grammy Awards for her work on releases by Maren Morris, Demi Lovato and Ingrid Andress.

== Early life and career ==
Laura Veltz started her music career as a vocalist and multi-instrumentalist of her family pop-rock group Cecilia in 1996 to 2006. After the group split up, in 2008, she moved to Nashville, Tennessee to pursue her career as a songwriter, lured by Kye Fleming and Mark D. Sanders. She started her songwriting career in Nashville by writing with country music group Edens Edge on their debut self-titled album.

In 2020, Veltz was nominated for her first Grammy Award in the category of Best Country Song for writing Dan + Shay's "Speechless".

== Songwriting discography ==
Title	Year	Artist(s)	Album
"Slow Motion"	2011	Edens Edge	Edens Edge (EP)
"Skinny Dippin'"	2012	Edens Edge	Edens Edge (album)
"Who Am I Drinking Tonight?"	2012	Edens Edge	Edens Edge (album)
"Liar"	2012	Edens Edge	Edens Edge (album)
"Cherry Pie"	2012	Edens Edge	Edens Edge (album)
"What I Love About Your Love"	2012	Jana Kramer	Jana Kramer
"Drunk Last Night"	2013	Eli Young Band	10,000 Towns
"Lonely Eyes"	2013	Chris Young	A.M.
"For a Boy"	2015	RaeLynn	Non-album single
"Livin' Ain't Killed Me Yet"	2015	Reba McEntire	Love Somebody
"Love You Hate You Miss You"	2016	Levi Hummon	Levi Hummon
"Sugar"	2016	Maren Morris	Hero
"Rich"	2016	Maren Morris	Hero
"I Could Use a Love Song"	2016	Maren Morris	Hero
"Space"	2016	Maren Morris	Hero
"Piano"	2016	Cassadee Pope	Summer
"We Do Us"	2017	Ryan Hurd	Ryan Hurd
"We Went to the Beach"	2017	Little Big Town	The Breaker
"Never Again"	2017	Eli Young Band	Fingerprints
"Once"	2017	Eli Young Band	Fingerprints
"Legacy"	2017	The Cadillac Three	Legacy
"Color"	2017	Carly Pearce	Every Little Thing
"To a T"	2018	Ryan Hurd	Platonic
"Weed, Whiskey and Willie"	2018	Brothers Osborne	Port Saint Joe
"There's a Girl"	2018	Trent Harmon	You Got 'Em All
"Her"	2018	Trent Harmon	You Got 'Em All
"On Paper"	2018	Trent Harmon	You Got 'Em All
"My Somebody"	2018	Trent Harmon	You Got 'Em All
"Keeping Score" (featuring Kelly Clarkson)	2018	Dan + Shay	Dan + Shay
"Speechless"	2018	Dan + Shay	Dan + Shay
"One Way"	2018	Dierks Bentley	The Mountain
"Live Forever"	2018	Kane Brown	Experiment
"Second to Last"	2018	Devin Dawson	Dark Horse
"Diamonds or Twine"	2019	Ryan Hurd	To a T
"Y'all People - Dedicated to the 'CoJo Nation'"	2019	Cody Johnson	Ain't Nothin' to It
"The Feels"	2019	Maren Morris	Girl
"A Song for Everything"	2019	Maren Morris	Girl
"Flavor"	2019	Maren Morris	Girl
"To Hell & Back"	2019	Maren Morris	Girl
"The Bones"	2019	Maren Morris	Girl
"That's on Me"	2019	Jake Owen	Greetings from... Jake
"In It"	2019	Jake Owen	Greetings from... Jake
"24/7/365"	2019	MacKenzie Porter	Non-album single
"What If I Never Get Over You"	2019	Lady A	Ocean
"What I'm Leaving For"	2019	Lady A	Ocean
"Underwater"	2019	Lady A	Ocean
"Mississippi to Me"	2019	Ryan Hurd	Panorama
"Half Hoping"	2019	Ryan Hurd	Platonic
"Old Soul"	2019	The Highwomen	The Highwomen
"Woman Like Her"	2020	Eric Paslay	Nice Guy
"Trying on Rings"	2020	Maddie & Tae	The Way It Feels
"Write a Book"	2020	Maddie & Tae	The Way It Feels
"New Dog Old Tricks"	2020	Maddie & Tae	The Way It Feels
"Preciatcha"	2020	Caylee Hammack	If It Wasn't for You
"Halfway Home"	2020	Carly Pearce	Carly Pearce
"Heart's Going Out of Its Mind"	2020	Carly Pearce	Carly Pearce
"Woman Down"	2020	Carly Pearce	Carly Pearce
"I Dare You"	2020	Kelly Clarkson	Non-album single
"Never Have I Ever"	2020	Danielle Bradbery	In Between: The Collection
"When This Is Over" (featuring Tauren Wells, Rita Wilson & The Oak Ridge Boys)	2020	Jimmie Allen	Bettie James
"Body Language of a Breakup"	2020	Lindsay Ell	Heart Theory
"Sheryl Crow"	2020	Tim McGraw	Here on Earth
"Better than We Found It"	2020	Maren Morris	Non-album single
"The Knife or the Hatchet"	2021	Ryan Hurd	Pelago
"What a Song Can Do"	2021	Lady A	What a Song Can Do
"Bucket List"	2021	Mitchell Tenpenny	Midtown Diaries
"Whatever Forever Is"	2021	Devin Dawson	The Pink Slip
"It's 'Cause I Am"	2021	Callista Clark	Real to Me
"Real To Me"	2021	Callista Clark	Real to Me
"Woman You Got"	2021	Maddie & Tae	Through the Madness, Vol. 1
"Heaven Right Now"	2021	Thomas Rhett	Country Again: Side A
"Bigger Man" (with Maren Morris)	2021	Joy Oladokun	In Defense of My Own Happiness
"Dream Girl"	2021	Idina Menzel	Cinderella
"Indigo"	2021	Mickey Guyton	Remember Her Name
"The Dreaming"	2021	Monsta X	The Dreaming
"Get You"	2021	Shawn Austin	Planes Don't Wait
"Lucky for Me"	2022	Eli Young Band	Love Talking
"Humble Quest"	2022	Maren Morris	Humble Quest
"Background Music"	2022	Maren Morris	Humble Quest
"Detour"	2022	Maren Morris	Humble Quest
"Pain"	2022	Ingrid Andress	Good Person
"Freak" (featuring Yungblud)	2022	Demi Lovato	Holy Fvck
"Skin of My Teeth"	2022	Demi Lovato	Holy Fvck
"Substance"	2022	Demi Lovato	Holy Fvck
"Eat Me" (featuring Royal & the Serpent)	2022	Demi Lovato	Holy Fvck
"Holy Fvck"	2022	Demi Lovato	Holy Fvck
"29"	2022	Demi Lovato	Holy Fvck
"Happy Ending"	2022	Demi Lovato	Holy Fvck
"Heaven"	2022	Demi Lovato	Holy Fvck
"Wasted"	2022	Demi Lovato	Holy Fvck
"Come Together"	2022	Demi Lovato	Holy Fvck
"Dead Friends"	2022	Demi Lovato	Holy Fvck
"Feed"	2022	Demi Lovato	Holy Fvck
"4 Ever 4 Me"	2022	Demi Lovato	Holy Fvck
"Spurs"	2022	Madeline Edwards	Crashlanded
"Heavy"	2022	Madeline Edwards	Crashlanded
"Mama, Dolly, Jesus"	2022	Madeline Edwards	Crashlanded
"Playground"	2022	Madeline Edwards	Crashlanded
"These Tears"	2022	Maddie & Tae	Through the Madness Vol. 2
"Antsy"	2022	Upsahl	Sagittarius
"Another Round"	2023	Reyna Roberts	Non-album single
"Still Alive"	2023	Demi Lovato	Scream VI
"Hey Little Mama"	2023	Morgan Evans	Life Upside Down
"ONE NATION UNDERDOGS"	2023	Royal & the Serpent	RAT TRAP 1: the blueprint
"Swine"	2023	Demi Lovato	Non-album single
"Make Me Hate Me"	2023	Idina Menzel	Drama Queen
"Good Time Getting There"	2023	Dallas Smith	Dallas Smith
"Get the Hell Out of Here"	2023	Maren Morris	The Bridge
"The Tree"	2023	Maren Morris	The Bridge
"Once A Year"	2023	Ingrid Andress	Non-album single
"Diamond"	2023	Callista Clark	TBA
"Attention"	2024	Georgia Webster	SIGNS
"Good On You"	2024	Priscilla Block	PB2
"So Do I"	2024	Tenille Arts	To Be Honest
"Consume"	2024	The Warning	Keep Me Fed
"High Road" (featuring Jessie Murph)	2024	Koe Wetzel	9 Lives
"Love Lies"	2024	Jessie Murph	That Ain't No Man That's the Devil
"Someone In This Room" (featuring Bailey Zimmerman)	2024	Jessie Murph	That Ain't No Man That's the Devil
"Bang Bang (The Ballad of Amy Fisher)"	2024	Jessie Murph	That Ain't No Man That's the Devil
"Leave Me Too"	2025	Josh Ross	Later Tonight

== Awards and nominations ==
=== Grammy Awards ===
Year	Category	Nominated work	Result	Ref.
2020	Best Country Song	"Speechless" (Shared with Dan + Shay and Jordan Reynolds)	Nominated	
2021	Best Country Song	"The Bones" (Shared with Maren Morris and Jimmy Robbins)	Nominated	
2022	Best Country Song	"Better than We Found It" (Shared with Maren Morris, Jimmy Robbins and Jessie Jo Dillon)	Nominated	
2023	Songwriter of the Year, Non-Classical	"Background Music", "Feed", "Humble Quest", "Pain", "29"	Nominated	

=== Academy of Country Music Awards ===
Year	Category	Nominated work	Result	Ref.
2021	Song of the Year	"The Bones" (Shared with Maren Morris and Jimmy Robbins)	Won	

=== Country Music Association Awards ===
Year	Category	Nominated work	Result	Ref.
2020	Song of the Year	"The Bones" (Shared with Maren Morris and Jimmy Robbins)	Won	
