= Edens Edge (EP) =

Edens Edge — EP

EP by Edens Edge
- Released: May 24, 2011
- Genre: Country
- Length: 17:01
- Label: Big Machine
- Producer: Mark Bright

Edens Edge chronology
Edens Edge — EP (2011)	Edens Edge (2012)

Edens Edge EP is a five-song extended play released from country music group Edens Edge. The extended play is the group's first release on Big Machine Records. It was released on May 24, 2011, and peaked at No. 43 on the Top Heatseekers chart. It features their debut single, "Amen", which was a Top 20 hit on the Hot Country Songs charts.

All songs from the EP except for "Slow Motion" later appeared on the band's self-titled debut album.

== Track listing ==
No.	Title	Writer(s)	Length
1.	"Amen"	Skip Black, Hannah Blaylock, Catt Gravitt, Gerald O'Brien	3:48
2.	"Swingin' Door"	Ashley Monroe, Brett James, Terry Clayton	3:41
3.	"Feels So Real"	Hillary Lindsey, Tia Sillers, Angelo Petraglia	4:10
4.	"Slow Motion"	Dean Berner, Laura Veltz, Don Rollins, Kye Fleming	3:16
5.	"Christ Alone"	Steve Smith	2:46
Total length:			17:01

== Chart performance ==
Chart (2011)	Peak position
US Billboard 200	51
US Top Country Albums (Billboard)	9
US Heatseekers Albums (Billboard)	43
