= You Got 'Em All =

Studio album by Trent Harmon
- Released: May 18, 2018
- Recorded: 2016–2018
- Studios: Ocean Way, Nashville; Sienna, Nashville; The Robbins Nest, Nashville; ZStudio, Nashville; EastWest, Hollywood
- Genre: Country
- Length: 36:56
- Label: Big Machine
- Producers: Scott Borchetta; Julian Raymond; Jimmy Robbins

Trent Harmon chronology
| Trent Harmon (2016) | You Got 'Em All (2018) |

Singles from You Got 'Em All
- 1. "There's a Girl" Released: June 23, 2016; 2. "You Got 'Em All" Released: February 8, 2018

You Got 'Em All is the debut studio album by American singer-songwriter Trent Harmon. It was released on May 18, 2018, by Big Machine Records. The album includes the singles "There's a Girl" and "You Got 'Em All".

== Content ==
Two singles have been released from the disc: "There's a Girl" was issued in June 2016, and reached peaks of numbers 27 and 18 on Hot Country Songs and Country Airplay, respectively. The title track is the second single, and was sent to radio in February 2018. Jimmy Robbins served as the main producer of the disc.

Harmon wrote eight of the eleven songs on the disc, including the title track, which was inspired by a woman with whom Harmon was romantically involved.

== Critical reception ==
Professional ratings
Review scores
| Source | Rating |
|---|---|
| AllMusic | 2.5/5 stars |

Rating it an "A", Markos Papadatos of Digital Journal wrote that "Overall, Trent Harmon will melt your heart with his new studio effort You Got 'Em All. Each song on this project has its own identity. "

== Commercial reception ==
The album debuted at No. 2 on Billboard's Heatseekers, No. 34 on Country, No. 60 on Top Album Sales. It has sold 4,500 copies in the United States as of June 2018.

== Track listing ==
| No. | Title | Writer(s) | Length |
|---|---|---|---|
| 1. | "You Got 'Em All" | Trent Harmon; Justin Ebach; Jordan Minton | 3:32 |
| 2. | "There's a Girl" | Harmon; Jimmy Robbins; Laura Veltz | 3:35 |
| 3. | "Hold On" | Jim Beavers; Chris Stapleton | 3:19 |
| 4. | "Her" | Harmon; Robbins; Veltz | 3:36 |
| 5. | "First Five Minutes" | Harmon; Paul DiGiovanni; Adam Hambrick | 2:46 |
| 6. | "Money's on You" | Harmon; Ebach; Josh Thompson | 3:39 |
| 7. | "'Cause I Do" | HarmonJosh Kerr; Nick Wayne | 3:11 |
| 8. | "On Paper" | Harmon; Robbins; Veltz | 3:07 |
| 9. | "My Somebody" | Harmon; Robbins; Veltz | 3:26 |
| 10. | "Falling" (Remix) | Dallas Davidson; Brett James; Keith Urban | 3:17 |
| 11. | "Chandelier" | Sia Furler; Jesse Shatkin | 3:35 |
| Total length: | | | 36:56 |

== Personnel ==
Adapted from the album liner notes.

Vocals

- Savannah Church – background vocals
- Trent Harmon – lead vocals
- Jimmy Robbins – background vocals
- Laura Veltz – background vocals

Musicians

- Tom Bukovac – acoustic guitar, electric guitar
- David Davidson – violin
- George Doering – acoustic guitar, banjo, mandolin
- David Dorn – keyboards
- Dan Fornero – trumpet
- Dan Higgins – tenor sax
- Sean Hurley – bass
- Victor Indrizzo – drums
- Charlie Judge – keyboards
- Nick Lane – trombone
- Carl Miner – acoustic guitar
- Jamie Muhoberac – keyboards
- Emily Nelson – cello
- Nir Z – drums, percussion
- Danny Rader – acoustic guitar
- Jimmy Robbins – acoustic guitar, electric guitar, bass, keyboards, percussion
- Joel Peskin – baritone sax
- Tim Pierce – acoustic guitar
- Bennett Salvay – keyboard
- Jimmie Lee Sloas – bass
- Ilya Toshinsky – acoustic guitar
- Derek Wells – electric guitar, banjo, mandolin
- Kristin Wilkinson – strings, violin, viola

Production

- Tim Brennan – record engineering assistance
- Scott Borchetta – executive production
- Adam Chagnon – additional engineering
- Bryan Cook – record engineering
- Ben Fowler – record engineering
- Serban Ghenea – mixing
- Mike Griffith – production coordination
- John Hanes – engineering for mixing
- Tim Heitz – programming
- David Huff – programming
- Ted Jensen – mastering
- Allison Jones – A&R
- Nik Karpen – mixing assistance
- Laurel Kittleson – production coordination
- Chris Lord-Alge – mixing
- Randy Merrill – mastering
- Nir Z – record engineering, digital editing
- Julian Raymond – production
- Kyle Richards – record engineering assistance
- Jimmy Robbins – production, record engineering, mixing, digital editing, programming
- Tyler Shields – record engineering assistance
- Janice Soled – production coordination
- Brianna Steinitz – production coordination
- Howard Willing – mixing
- Ryan Young – record engineering assistance

== Charts ==
| Year | Single | Peak chart positions | |
| Year | Single | US Country | US Country Airplay |
|---|---|---|---|
| 2016 | "There's a Girl" | 27 | 18 |
| 2018 | "You Got 'Em All" | — | 39 |
