= It's 'Cause I Am =

Single by Callista Clark

from the album Real to Me: The Way I Feel
- Released: March 29, 2021
- Genre: Country
- Length: 2:47
- Label: Big Machine
- Songwriters: Callista Clark; Cameron Jaymes; Laura Veltz
- Producer: Nathan Chapman

Callista Clark singles chronology
"It's 'Cause I Am" (2021)	"Gave It Back Broken" (2022)

Music video
- "It's 'Cause I Am" on YouTube

"It's 'Cause I Am" is a song by American country music singer Callista Clark. It was released on March 29, 2021, as lead single from her debut studio album, Real to Me: The Way I Feel. Clark wrote the song, along with Cameron Jaymes and Laura Veltz. "It's 'Cause I Am" was produced by Nathan Chapman.

== Background ==
Real to Me, Callista Clark's debut EP, was released on February 12, 2021, with the impact date for "It's 'Cause I Am" to country radio set for March 29, 2021. "It's 'Cause I Am" was written on December 16, 2019 in Nashville by Clark, Cameron Jaymes and Laura Veltz at Jaymes' backyard studio "The Garden Shed". Clark told Taste of Country that the track was "about someone telling you that you can't do something", and that "it's always been a special song to me, and it's the one song that I thought people my age could really relate to". In an interview with Sounds Like Nashville, Clark said that she wrote the song after an encounter with a man in a Starbucks who saw her with a guitar and said "pfft, good luck", with Clark saying the song was addressed to "anybody who made me feel small or less than I was", and it was her way of "putting them back in their place a little and boosting my confidence".

== Critical reception ==
Forbes' Rianna Turner called "It's Cause I Am" an "unapologetic declaration of confidence", comparing it to other "empowering country woman hits" such as "Man! I Feel Like a Woman!" and "Girl". In a piece for Billboard, Tom Roland said that the song's "staggered phrasing, the rock-edged chords and the confident conclusion" were similar to a Bonnie Raitt song, and that Clark's timbre is "older than her chronological age", comparing it to LeAnn Rimes in the 1990s.

== Commercial performance ==
Released to US country radio as a single on March 29, 2021, the song first appeared on the Billboard Country Airplay chart at number 60, on the chart dated for April 3, 2021. The song has since risen to a peak of number 20 on that chart. Clark claimed on June 8, 2021, that the song had received one million streams on Spotify. As of June 10, 2021, Spotify's artist page for Clark lists "It's 'Cause I Am" as having 1,060,021 streams.

== Music video ==
A music video for "It's 'Cause I Am" was released on June 4, 2021, directed by Audrey Ellis Fox. Clark said of the video that "I couldn’t be more excited to release my first music video! This is the kind of thing I’ve always dreamed about. Being on set and watching it come to life was surreal."

== Credits and personnel ==
- Callista Clark − lead vocals, background vocals, composition, lyrics
- Nathan Chapman − production, acoustic guitar, bass guitar, electric guitar, mixing
- Cameron Jaymes − composition, lyrics
- Laura Veltz − composition, lyrics
- Aaron Sterling − drums
- Kevin Kadish − electric guitar
- Brian David Willis − engineer
- Dave Cohen − keyboards
- Ted Jensen − mastering engineer
- Jeff Balding − recording engineer

== Charts ==
Chart performance for "It's 'Cause I Am"
Chart (2021–2022)	Peak position
Canada Country (Billboard)	43
US Country Airplay (Billboard)	20
US Hot Country Songs (Billboard)	30

== Release history ==
Release dates and formats for "It's 'Cause I Am"
Region	Date	Format	Label(s)	Ref.
United States	March 29, 2021	Country radio	Big Machine	
