= Edens Edge (album) =

Studio album by Edens Edge
- Released: June 12, 2012
- Genre: Country
- Length: 37:25
- Label: Big Machine
- Producers: Mark Bright; Dann Huff; Edens Edge

Edens Edge chronology
Edens Edge (2011)	Edens Edge (2012)

Singles from Edens Edge
- 1. "Amen" Released: March 28, 2011; 2. "Too Good to Be True" Released: April 9, 2012

Professional ratings
Review scores
Source	Rating
Allmusic	3/5 stars

Edens Edge is the self-titled debut album of the American country music group Edens Edge. It was released on June 12, 2012, via Big Machine Records. Its first single, "Amen," was released in March 2011. It includes four of the five songs from their debut EP. The second single, "Too Good to Be True," was released April 2012. Mark Bright and Dann Huff produced the album.

In June 2012, the album was re-released as a deluxe edition exclusive to Cracker Barrel Old Country Store, featuring three bonus tracks, produced by the band members themselves.

== Track listing ==
No.	Title	Writer(s)	Length
1.	"Amen"	Skip Black, Hannah Blaylock, Catt Gravitt, Gerald O'Brien	3:48
2.	"Swingin' Door"	Terry Clayton, Brett James, Ashley Monroe	3:41
3.	"Skinny Dippin'"	Dean Berner, Laura Veltz, Vince Melamed	3:44
4.	"Too Good to Be True"	Gordie Sampson, Hillary Lindsey, Troy Verges	3:17
5.	"Last Supper"	Blaylock, Gravitt, Danny Myrick	3:33
6.	"Feels So Real"	Lindsey, Tia Sillers, Angelo Petraglia	4:08
7.	"Who Am I Drinking Tonight?"	Blaylock, Veltz	3:40
8.	"Liar"	Andy Stochansky, Veltz	3:30
9.	"Cherry Pie"	Berner, Melamed, Veltz	5:11
10.	"Christ Alone"	Steve Smith	2:53

Cracker Barrel Deluxe Edition Bonus Tracks
No.	Title	Writer(s)	Length
11.	"Roots"	Green, Gravitt, Black	3:00
12.	"Little Bird"	Berner	3:25
13.	"Wherever I Go"	Blaylock, Joy Williams, Myrick, Jennifer Schott	3:21

== Personnel ==
From Edens Edge Cracker Barrel deluxe edition liner notes.

=== Edens Edge ===
- Hannah Blaylock – lead vocals
- Dean Berner – Dobro, acoustic guitar, lap steel guitar, ganjo, background vocals
- Cherrill Green – banjo, bouzouki, acoustic guitar, mandolin, background vocals

=== Additional musicians ===
- Bruce Bouton – steel guitar
- Nick Buda – drums
- Tom Bukovac – electric guitar, piano
- J.T. Corenflos – electric guitar
- Stuart Duncan – fiddle
- Lester Estelle – drums on "Roots", "Little Bird", and "Wherever I Go"
- Shannon Forrest – drums
- Mark Hill – bass guitar
- Dann Huff – electric guitar
- Charlie Judge – keyboards
- Jerry McPherson – electric guitar
- Mike Rojas – keyboards
- Jimmie Lee Sloas – bass guitar
- Ilya Toshinsky – banjo, Dobro, acoustic guitar, electric guitar, resonator guitar
- Mark Trussell – acoustic guitar on "Roots", "Little Bird", and "Wherever I Go"

=== Technical ===
- Mark Bright – production (tracks 1, 2, 5, 6)
- Edens Edge – production (tracks 11–13)
- Dann Huff – production (tracks 3, 4, 7, 8–10)

== Charts ==
=== Weekly charts ===
Chart (2012)	Peak position
US Billboard 200	51
US Top Country Albums (Billboard)	9

=== Year-end charts ===
Chart (2012)	Position
US Top Country Albums (Billboard)	69

=== Singles ===
Year	Single	Peak chart positions	
Year	Single	US Country	US
2011	"Amen"	18	83
2012	"Too Good to Be True"	27	—
"—" denotes releases that did not chart
