= Too Good to Be True (Edens Edge song) =

Single by Edens Edge

from the album Edens Edge
- Released: April 9, 2012
- Genre: Country
- Length: 3:17
- Label: Big Machine
- Songwriters: Gordie Sampson; Hillary Lindsey; Troy Verges
- Producer: Dann Huff

Edens Edge singles chronology
"Amen" (2011)	"Too Good to Be True" (2012)

"Too Good to Be True" is a song written by Gordie Sampson, Hillary Lindsey and Troy Verges, and recorded by American country music group Edens Edge. It was released in April 2012 as the second single from their debut album Edens Edge.

This was Edens Edge's last single on Big Machine Records and remains their last single to be released as of 2013.

== Critical reception ==
Bobby Peacock of Roughstock gave it 4½ stars out of 5, saying that it "is slick but not overdone or bombastic" and has "interesting similes and metaphors". It received 4 out of 5 stars from Billy Dukes of Taste of Country, who thought that the song's storyline was similar to other songs such as "Good Girl" by Carrie Underwood, but said that "the production is top-notch".

== Music video ==
The music video was directed by Peter Zavadil and premiered in June 2012.

== Chart performance ==
Chart (2012)	Peak position
US Hot Country Songs (Billboard)	27

=== Year-end charts ===
Chart (2012)	Position
US Country Songs (Billboard)	94
