= Cecilia (band) =

American pop-rock band

- Origin: New York City, New York
- Genres: Rock, pop
- Years active: 1999–2006
- Label: Atlantic (2001–2002)
- Past members: Allison Veltz; Drew Veltz; Jeannie Veltz; Ken Veltz; Laura Veltz; Kevin "KJ" Jacoby; Lee Solomon

Cecilia was a pop-rock band based in New York. The band was from the Washington, D.C. area, then later moved to Astoria, Queens. While not a religious group, the band chose the name Cecilia from Saint Cecilia, patron saint of music and of the blind. The band released one album as the Veltz Family.

== History ==
The band was formed by the members of the Veltz family, then living in Vienna, Virginia, in 1998 when Allison, Drew and Laura Vettz began performing songs written by their father, Kenneth Veltz, at local venues. The acoustic trio played local open mic gigs with Drew playing guitar for his sisters. The group moved to New York in 2000. That same year they recorded Live at Zig's at two live performances in August, which was released in 2001. After a string of temporary bassists, Cecilia added Kevin Jacoby in late 2000. Cecilia was in negotiations to join Blackbird Records an affiliate of Atlantic Records just before the merger of AOL and Time Warner, which ended Blackbird's affiliation with Atlantic. This led to Cecilia being signed by Atlantic Records in early 2001.

In the aftermath of September 11 the group recorded an EP entitled September in tribute to the firefighters lost. They donated the proceeds from the album sales to firefighter charities and the group devoted much of their work in benefit of firefighters at that time. After disagreements with Atlantic, the group parted ways with the label in the fall of 2002 before recording an album. The EP Off The Record (album) contains demo cuts for that never-recorded album. That same fall the band played a series of acoustic shows in the window of the Manhattan Theatre Source and later released a live album from those performances. In 2004 the band recorded their first complete studio album, This, through the help of fan funding. The band announced in late January 2006 that Kevin Jacoby would be leaving the band. In September, 2006, This was released under the band name the Veltz Family, rather than as Cecilia.

== Music ==
The band's pop music sound is focused around the three-part vocal harmonies provided by lead singers Laura and Allison along with backing vocals by their mother Jeannie, which are reminiscent of the Indigo Girls.

The band's final lineup consisted of:

- Allison Veltz - lead vocal, percussion
- Drew Veltz - lead guitar
- Jeannie Veltz - vocals, percussion
- Ken Veltz - songwriter, drums, guitar, vocals
- Laura Veltz - songwriter, lead vocal, rhythm guitar, accordion, percussion
- Kevin Jacoby - bass

== Discography ==
- 1999 - It Just Doesn't Matter
- 1999 - Kitchen Mix
- 2001 - Live @ Zig's
- 2002 - September
- 2002 - Off The Record
- 2003 - Live @ The Source
- 2006 - This (as The Veltz Family)

== Follow-up ==
- As of 2012 Ken and Jeannie were also in Nashville, still performing as an acoustic duo in small, intimate clubs, house concerts, and listening rooms. In 2011, they sold their property and became traveling musicians.
- Kevin Jacoby (KJ) stayed in New York City and married costume designer Cora Levin. He returned to life as a freelance bass player, appearing live and on recordings with artists including La Mecanica Popular, Ato Essandoh, Chris London, Owen Brown, and Rocky Bryant of Average White Band. In 2017, KJ formed The Oddysy with DJ Johnny Juice of Public Enemy.

== See also ==
- List of sibling groups § Sibling musical groups
