= The Super Mario Bros. Movie (soundtrack) =

The Super Mario Bros. Movie (Original Motion Picture Soundtrack)

Film score by Brian Tyler
- Released: April 7, 2023
- Recorded: October–December 2022
- Studios: Eastwood Scoring Stage, Warner Bros. Studios; Skywalker Sound
- Genre: Film score
- Length: 87:46
- Labels: Back Lot Music; iam8bit
- Producer: Brian Tyler

Brian Tyler chronology
Scream VI (2023)	The Super Mario Bros. Movie (Original Motion Picture Soundtrack) (2023)	Fast X (2023)

Singles from The Super Mario Bros. Movie (Original Motion Picture Soundtrack)
- 1. "Peaches" Released: April 7, 2023

The Super Mario Bros. Movie (Original Motion Picture Soundtrack) is the soundtrack to the 2023 film of the same name, based on Nintendo's Mario video game franchise. The original score for the film is composed by Brian Tyler, who incorporated and remixed the original themes from longtime Mario composer Koji Kondo under his collaboration. According to Tyler, he wanted to "incorporate the music that I heard in that 8-bit form and along the way bring it into the world of a big epic, emotional film score." This resulted in partly original music that referenced several leitmotifs from various Mario games as well as themes from Donkey Kong.

Recording sessions for the film began in October 2022 at the Eastwood Scoring Stage at Warner Bros. and sound mixing happened at Skywalker Sound in California. The album featured most of Tyler's original score along with two songs for the film, which includes "Peaches" performed by Jack Black as Bowser, released as a digital single. The album was released on April 7, 2023, by Back Lot Music, two days after the film. It was also released in CD, vinyl and cassettes via iam8bit.

The score received acclaim from critics, who praised its production and Tyler's use of Kondo's themes.

== Production and composition ==
"This score is big. It's orchestral, it's got choir, and it's got bands, it's got Italian instruments, accordions, live drums, mandolins, and whistling human voices. Also, I'm using eight-bit [sounds]. I'll be playing the drums, and all of a sudden the tom fill is just eight-bit tom fills. It's really eclectic, but at the same time, the goal was that it would work on a level that a score like [John Williams' score for] E.T. [does]. It has a transcendent nature; it is not limited by the polyphony you have on an eight-bit thing. It's not just porting over melodies from a game to a movie. It had to be so much more to capture what this film is."

— Brian Tyler, on the score for The Super Mario Bros. Movie

During an October 2022 Nintendo Direct presentation, Meledandri confirmed that Brian Tyler was set to compose the score for the film, in his first full-fledged animated feature. Tyler worked with longtime Mario composer Koji Kondo to incorporate themes from the video games into the film's score. He further rearranged Kondo's themes as more abstract sounds, that sounded both "retro and off-the-moment" with nods to hip-hop, jazz and 8-bit music. Tyler said, "It was a palate that is unique to Mario [...] This exact combination of instruments would be crazy in another movie. It was a blast."

On mixing the new themes into the old music, Tyler wanted to bring the simplicity of the 8 and 16-bit music as well as multiple Mario themes, including music for Donkey Kong, but with the help of harmony, rhythm and synth music, as all of them had its own signature idea, and while bringing those themes, it needed to be seamless. Tyler referred to John Williams' scores, as "[There's music for] villains, and heroes, and love themes, and our heroes, but at the point at which they're struggling, and all these things that not only tell the narrative story and clarify that, but emotionally clarify everything. [The intention is] that that can go along and seamlessly have sub-themes or antithetical call-and-response themes, where it is referencing something that is from a particular game that has a special meaning with a character that is in that scene."

Tyler's orchestral music pieces help them to propel the film forward, and also suite its characters, especially for Princess Peach as her main theme is "uplifting, light-stepping and sweeping" and also had "the most heroic feel" since Peach had evolved from the damsel-in-distress roots and essentially acts as Mario's tutor throughout the film. The second part of her theme was considered to be "really beautiful and emotional". Songs from Jack Black and Keegan-Michael Key were improvised for the film. The film featured numerous easter eggs of melodies for the characters, as Tyler admitted that "There are retro references sonically, but I thought the movie would require an emotional depth — the hero's journey and all that — that it should rely on instruments that could be more aggressive. But at the same time the melodies are played and it's really cool." His main Mario theme had referenced leitmotifs from Super Mario Bros. 3, Super Mario 64, Super Mario 3D Land and other Mario games.

== Influences ==
The Mario video game designer, Shigeru Miyamoto said that "the goal was to create something instantly catchy that would grab the ear of someone walking through an arcade". He wanted the theme to follow Mario as games evolved, and it can be heard anywhere "People from across generations can enjoy it, and when they hear it, they may be thinking about different games, but the important factor is they recognize the series. I think a lot of people, when they start a new game, want to do something new and different, but at this day and age, I feel very happy and proud that we stuck to our guns and made sure that the core fundamental aspect is something we maintained through all these years."

Tyler's collaboration with Kondo was "relatively close" as he would regularly call upon Kondo to remind him of certain notes or pieces from various Mario games, as he looked on for pieces to interpret. Kondo sent him sample data for music from games, which he thought might be appropriate to work into different scenes, and was confident on Tyler using that to support the music in the film. He and Miyamoto did not give specific instructions to Tyler, except for some cues that were not used appropriately but provide a list of suggestions that would work in the film. Miyamoto admitted that he asked Tyler to add music from Donkey Kong games in the jungle sequences. During the sound mixing of the film at Skywalker Sound, Kondo and Miyamoto responded positively to a fifteen-minute suite of new themes Tyler had created for the film.

== Release ==
The Super Mario Bros. Movie (Original Motion Picture Soundtrack) was released on April 7, 2023, two days after the film's release by Back Lot Music, and Jack Black's song "Peaches" accompanied as the lead single. Lyrical Lemonade released a music video of Jack Black performing "Peaches" on the same day, directed by Cole Bennett. According to Black, it was filmed within a few hours.

In addition to a digital release, the album is also set to be made available in physical formats, through CD, cassette and vinyl. Iam8bit distributed two-disc CDs and LPs, and a 7'' inch vinyl disc of the single "Peaches". The vinyl edition distributed by Iam8bit featured a pink and yellow colored vinyl disc, while the retail edition included red and green discs. These editions will be shipped for the public distribution by the third quarter of 2023 (July–September).

== Reception ==
The music received acclaim from critics. Frank Scheck of The Hollywood Reporter commented that the score cleverly riffs on Kondo's themes, that provided a suitable accompaniment. Zanobard Reviews gave the album a 9 (out of 10), stating: "Overall, Brian Tyler's score for The Super Mario Bros. Movie is like... everything you could possibly want in a score for a Mario movie, and then some". Soundtrack Universe awarded it with a score of four-and-a-half stars out of five: "While the album presentation for Super Mario Bros. Movie does begin to get tedious near the third act, the constant energy and seemingly boundless creativity from Tyler and his team on display makes the nearly ninety minute album breeze by. Add to that the very solid trio of central themes, fantastic orchestrations and intelligent integration of Mario franchise legacy themes and Tyler's efforts are highly commendable."

Filmtracks.com gave the album four stars out of five, closing out its review with: "As a coordination effort, Tyler deserves significant praise for his care and attention to this franchise's music. His new main and Peach themes are worthy additions. The score is wildly out of control and shifts between themes and eras with zeal, but that's the whole point." Music critic Jonathan Broxton summarised the review, saying "Fans of the Super Mario Bros. games, in all its various incarnations, will certainly be the ones who get the most out of this score [...] The action music, especially in the score's final third, is terrifically satisfying, some of the best music of this type he has written in quite some time, and while some of the rapid shifts in tempo and style could prove to be overwhelming for those of a calmer disposition, anyone who has bought into Tyler's previous work in this style will surely find the Super Mario Bros. Movie to be rewarding." Analysing the film's music, The Escapist writer Marty Sliva had mixed reactions. He felt Tyler's score is "at its best when it celebrates Nintendo's history" while criticising the needle drops as "constant bore".

== Track listing ==
All tracks are written by Brian Tyler, except where noted. Original Nintendo themes were written by Koji Kondo and other Nintendo composers.

The Super Mario Bros. Movie (Original Motion Picture Soundtrack) track listing
No.	Title	Length
1.	"Super Mario Bros. Opus (Note: This track includes parts of themes by Koji Kondo, Naoto Kubo, Shiho Fujii, Ryo Nagamatsu, Mahito Yokota, Kazumi Totaka, Naoto Kubo, Asuka Ohta, Hajime Wakai, David Wise, Yukio Kaneoka, Minako Hamano, Masaru Tajima, Shinji Ushiroda, Daisuke Matsuoka, Eveline Novakovic, Grant Kirkhope, Atsuko Asahi, Mahito Yokota, Soyo Oka, Yasunori Mitsuda, Hirokazu Tanaka, and Yoko Shimomura)"	6:42
2.	"Press Start"	2:38
3.	"King of the Koopas"	3:33
4.	"Plumbin' Ain't Easy"	1:16
5.	"It's a Dog Eat Plumber World"	1:15
6.	"Saving Brooklyn"	1:47
7.	"The Warp Pipe"	2:05
8.	"Strange New World"	2:03
9.	"The Darklands"	2:20
10.	"Welcome to the Mushroom Kingdom"	2:18
11.	"2 Player Game"	5:07
12.	"The Mushroom Council"	2:07
13.	"The Plumber and the Peach"	1:21
14.	"Platforming Princess"	1:39
15.	"World 1-1" ( (Note: This track is exclusive to the soundtrack and does not appear in the movie.))	2:34
16.	"The Adventure Begins"	3:04
17.	"Peaches" (written by Jack Black, Aaron Horvath, Eric Osmond, John Spiker and Michael Jelenic; performed by Jack Black)	1:35
18.	"Lost and Crowned"	1:39
19.	"Imprisoned"	2:54
20.	"Courting the Kongs"	2:00
21.	"Drivin' Me Bananas" ( (Note: This track is exclusive to the soundtrack and does not appear in the movie.))	1:20
22.	"Rumble in the Jungle"	3:59
23.	"Karts!"	1:51
24.	"Practice Makes Perfect"	1:00
25.	"Buckle Up"	1:31
26.	"Rainbow Road Rage"	3:31
27.	"Blue Shelled"	2:26
28.	"An Indecent Proposal"	3:24
29.	"The Belly of the Beast"	1:23
30.	"Fighting Tooth and Veil"	3:45
31.	"Tactical Tanooki"	2:22
32.	"Mario Brothers Rap" (written by Haim Saban and Shuki Levy; performed by Ali Dee)	0:58
33.	"Grapple in the Big Apple"	3:40
34.	"Superstars"	1:39
35.	"The Super Mario Brothers"	1:27
36.	"Bonus Level"	1:01
37.	"Level Complete"	2:32
Total length:		87:46

== Additional music ==
Black Hydra composed the music for its official trailer, called "Super Mushroom", based on the Super Mario Bros. theme. The instrumental was released on November 30, 2022, on YouTube. In a March 2023 video, Seth Rogen shared that Donkey Kong is introduced in the film accompanied by the title theme music from Donkey Kong 64, the "DK Rap", composed by Grant Kirkhope & George Andreas. In contrast to the licensed songs that were used in the film, Kirkhope & Andreas did not receive credit for the "DK Rap" in the film's end credits, an oversight the former composer found disappointing. Kirkhope was later told that Nintendo's policy was not to credit composers on music sourced from games that the company owned.

Licensed songs that were included in the film include:

Song title	Author	Additional info
"Battle Without Honor or Humanity"	Tomoyasu Hotei	
"No Sleep till Brooklyn"	Beastie Boys	
"Habanera"	Georges Bizet	From Carmen; performed by Anita Rachvelishvili and Orchestra Sinfonica Nazionale della RAI, conducted by Giacomo Sagripanti
"Attack! Fury Bowser"	Daisuke Matsuoka & James Phillipsen	From Super Mario 3D World + Bowser's Fury
"Holding Out for a Hero"	Jim Steinman, Dean Pitchford	
"Take On Me"	a-ha	
"DK Rap"	Grant Kirkhope, George Andreas & Chris Sutherland (uncredited)	From Donkey Kong 64
"Thunderstruck"	AC/DC	
"Wedding March"	Felix Mendelssohn (uncredited)	
"Mr. Blue Sky"	Electric Light Orchestra	

== Charts ==
Weekly chart performance for The Super Mario Bros. Movie (Original Motion Picture Soundtrack)
Chart (2023)	Peak position
Belgian Albums (Ultratop Wallonia)	106
Japanese Albums (Oricon)	26
Japanese Digital Albums (Oricon)	5
Japanese Hot Albums (Billboard Japan)	22
UK Album Downloads (Official Charts)	14
UK Compilation Albums (Official Charts)	30
UK Soundtrack Albums (Official Charts)	6
US Billboard 200	123

== Release history ==
Release dates and formats for The Super Mario Bros. Movie (Original Motion Picture Soundtrack)
Region	Date	Format(s)	Label	Ref.
Various	April 7, 2023	Digital download; streaming	Back Lot Music	
Various	2023	CD	Iam8bit	
Various	2023	Vinyl	Iam8bit	
Various	2023	Cassette	Iam8bit	
