= Real to Me (EP) =

EP by Callista Clark
- Released: February 12, 2021
- Genre: Country
- Length: 16:47
- Label: Big Machine
- Producer: Nathan Chapman

Callista Clark chronology
Real to Me (2021)	Real to Me: The Way I Feel (2022)

Singles from Real to Me
- 1. "It's 'Cause I Am" Released: March 29, 2021

Real to Me is the debut EP by American country singer Callista Clark, which is produced by Nathan Chapman. The five-track EP was released on February 12, 2021, by Big Machine Records. "It's 'Cause I Am" impacted US country radio on March 29, 2021, as the lead single for the EP.

== Background ==
Clark began writing songs at the age of 11, and was discovered by Big Machine Records after posting a cover of the Creedence Clearwater Revival song "Have You Ever Seen the Rain?" on Facebook, where it received 27 million views. She was signed to Big Machine at the age of 15. The title track on the EP was written by Clark at the age of 15, after she experienced her first breakup. She told Hollywood Life that people had told her that "what I was feeling wasn’t real yet or wasn’t valid yet, just because of how young I was", but that "it felt very real to me!"

== Critical reception ==
Melinda Newman writing for Billboard praised the EP, saying that Clark had "confidence and verve". Markos Papadatos of Digital Journal gave the album 4.5 out of 5 stars, proclaiming that Clark is "poised for stardom", and naming "Don't Need It Anymore" as his personal favourite, stating that it "showcases [Clark's] wide range as a recording artist". Forbes' Rianna Turner noted the influence of Southern church music and "90s and contemporary country radio hits" on the EP, saying that Clark's "mature vocal timbre" and lyrical quality gave the EP a timeless quality.

== Track listing ==
Credits adapted from Tidal. All tracks are produced by Nathan Chapman.

Track listing for Real to Me
No.	Title	Writer(s)	Length
1.	"It's 'Cause I Am"	Callista Clark; Cameron Jaymes; Laura Veltz	2:47
2.	"Heartbreak Song"	Clark; Chris DeStefano; Emily Shackleton; Liz Rose	4:16
3.	"Change My Mind"	Clark; Dan Isbell; Jonathan Singleton	3:09
4.	"Don't Need It Anymore"	Clark; Jaymes; Melissa Peirce	3:19
5.	"Real To Me"	Clark; Casey Robert Brown; Veltz	3:16
Total length:			16:47

== Personnel ==
Credits adapted from AllMusic and Tidal.

- Nathan Chapman - banjo (track 3), acoustic guitar (all tracks), bass guitar (all tracks), electric guitar (tracks 1, 2), steel guitar (track 4), background vocals (track 3)
- Callista Clark - acoustic guitar (track 2), lead vocals (all tracks), background vocals (all tracks)
- Dave Cohen - keyboards (all tracks)
- Kevin Kadish - electric guitar (all tracks)
- Rob McNelley - electric guitar (tracks 4, 5)
- Miles McPherson - drums (tracks 2, 3)
- Aaron Sterling - drums (tracks 1, 4, 5)
- Derek Wells - electric guitar (track 2)
