= Scream VI (soundtrack) =

Scream VI (Music from the Motion Picture)

Soundtrack album by Brian Tyler and Sven Faulconer
- Released: March 10, 2023
- Recorded: 2022–2023
- Genre: Film score
- Length: 95:23
- Label: Paramount Music

Brian Tyler chronology
Chip 'n Dale: Rescue Rangers (2022)	Scream VI (2023)	The Super Mario Bros. Movie (2023)

Sven Faulconer chronology
The Elephant Whisperers (2022)	Scream VI (2023)	Unstable (2023)

Singles from Scream VI (Music from the Motion Picture)
- 1. "Still Alive" Released: March 3, 2023; 2. "In My Head" Released: March 10, 2023

Scream VI (Music from the Motion Picture) is the soundtrack to the 2023 film Scream VI, the sixth instalment in the Scream franchise and the sequel to Scream (2022), directed by Matt Bettinelli-Olpin and Tyler Gillett. Featuring musical score composed by Brian Tyler and Sven Faulconer, the score was released by Paramount Music on March 10, 2023, alongside the film. It was preceded by two singles—"Still Alive" performed by Demi Lovato and "In My Head" by Mike Shinoda and Kailee Morgue.

== Development ==
In December 2022, Brian Tyler returned from the predecessor to score music for Scream VI. The following month, Sven Faulconer was hired to co-compose the music with Tyler, thereby marking his first feature composition. Due to the changes made in the writing and creative decisions, especially Neve Campbell's decision to not reprise her role as Sidney Prescott, the score for the film had new themes composed for the film, excluding Marco Beltrami's themes for the previous films.

== Release ==
American singer Demi Lovato performed "Still Alive", which served as the lead single of the soundtrack, and released on March 3, 2023 by Island Records. The accompanying music video was broadcast on the ABC television series Good Morning America. In February 2023, Linkin Park's Mike Shinoda during an interview with KROQ had revealed that he would be releasing a solo song as part of the Scream VI soundtrack. The aforementioned track has been titled "In My Head", and Kailee Morgue was the featured artist in the song, released on March 10, 2023.

A 6-minute score suite composed by Tyler for the film had been released exclusively on Collider on March 9, 2023. Reviewing for that cue, Matt Villei had felt that it "combines somber and haunting strings along with hints of soft percussion and piano that start slow and builds until it becomes loud and frantic before returning to its slow introduction, adding voices and other sounds to build back towards a frenetic section." Tyler and Faulconer's score was released by Paramount Music on March 10, 2023.

It is the first Scream soundtrack, not to be distributed by Varèse Sarabande which previously released score soundtracks of the predecessors. However, the label had issued a double CD and double LP editions of the album in collaboration with Craft Recordings. The double CD edition featured a 12-page booklet with cast photos from the set which was released on September 1. The vinyl edition consisted of a 180-gram LP records pressed in stab green and black colored variant and a gatefold jacket packaged with an original artwork from illustrator Doaly was released on December 1.

== Reception ==
Filmtracks.com wrote "In making this franchise his own, Tyler has charted a course directly back to his comfort zone." Manuel São Bento of FirstShowing.net commented "Brian Tyler and Sven Falcouner's score feels more complex as it incorporates classic tracks with new music." A reviewer from Flickering Myth wrote "Composer Brian Tyler and Sven Faulconer also do a tremendous job behind-the-scenes, churning out exciting new material while artfully paying homage to Marco Beltrami's contributions from past Scream films." Hollywood.com complimented the score as "mix of original and classic horror movie themes". Writing for Scribe Magazine, Y. Ella commented that "the score by Brian Tyler is suspenseful and keeps you on the edge of your seat. The score keeps that tension in the horror scenes."

== Track listing ==
Scream VI (Music from the Motion Picture)
No.	Title	Length
1.	"Scream VI Suite"	6:15
2.	"Prelude"	0:42
3.	"Something Red"	2:36
4.	"Walk It Off"	1:32
5.	"Warmer Colder"	4:28
6.	"Sam at the Shrink"	2:44
7.	"Sam and Danny"	2:35
8.	"Not Overreacting"	0:47
9.	"Bodega Terror"	2:29
10.	"Stalking the Aisles"	1:17
11.	"Stuck in Town"	2:29
12.	"Last Therapy Session"	1:39
13.	"It's a Franchise"	3:26
14.	"Ghostface History"	1:51
15.	"Sam Is Suspect"	0:47
16.	"The Core Four"	1:51
17.	"Apartment Mayhem"	7:16
18.	"Don't Trust Anyone"	1:09
19.	"Off the Case"	1:00
20.	"The Shrine"	4:35
21.	"Game Recognize Game"	0:45
22.	"Make Your Own Family"	1:32
23.	"No Press Allowed"	0:36
24.	"Tracing the Call"	2:02
25.	"Gale's Apartment"	4:37
26.	"Gale vs Ghostface"	2:42
27.	"Tara's Plan"	2:06
28.	"Two Subways"	5:48
29.	"Kill Box"	1:49
30.	"Trapped"	2:04
31.	"Tara and Chad"	0:52
32.	"Theater Ambush"	2:28
33.	"Standoff"	2:44
34.	"Revelations"	3:57
35.	"The Grand Finale"	3:38
36.	"Revenge"	2:46
37.	"Together"	2:36
38.	"Haunted"	0:32

=== Soundtrack ===
No.	Title	Writer(s)	Length
1.	"Sí o No" (performed by Tatiana Hazel)	Tatiana Hazel Resendiz & Stephen Ponce	2:51
2.	"Picaflor" (performed by Lao Ra and C. Tangana)	C. Tangana (as Anton Alfaro), Kevin Carbo, Lao Ra (as Laura Carvajalino) & Bigram Zayas	2:58
3.	"In My Head" (performed by Mike Shinoda and Kailee Morgue)	Mike Shinoda & Jake Torrey	2:52
4.	"October Passed Me By" (performed by Girl in Red)	Aaron Dessner & Girl in Red (as Marie Ulven Ringheim)	2:46
5.	"Bijoux" (performed by Soap)	Adelie Beaume, Ernesto Rodriguez, Alfredo Rodriguez & Mariano Mendoza	4:23
6.	"Blow the Whistle" (performed by Too Short)	James Phillips, La Marquis Jefferson, Craig Love (as Craig D. Love), Too $hort (as Todd Anthony Shaw) & Lil Jon (as Jonathan Smith)	2:43
7.	"Menthol*" (performed by Jean Dawson featuring Mac DeMarco)	Jean Dawson, Zach Fogarty & Mac DeMarco (as Macbriare DeMarco)	3:07
8.	"Luchini AKA This Is It" (performed by Camp Lo)	Geechi Suede (as Saladine T. Wallace), Sonny Cheeba (as Salahadeen Wilds), David Anthony Willis, Ricky Smith (as Ricky Darnell Smith), Kevin Spencer & Richard Randolph	4:00
9.	"Walkin'" (performed by Denzel Curry)	Denzel Curry, Keith Mansfield & Kal Banx (as Kalon Berry)	4:40
10.	"When the Party's Over" (performed by Billie Eilish)	Finneas O'Connell	3:16
11.	"You Have Stolen My Heart" (performed by Brian Fallon)	Brian Fallon	3:45
12.	"I Am Controlled by Your Love" (performed by Helene Smith)	Willie Clarke & Clarence Reid	3:07
13.	"Red Right Hand" (performed by Nick Cave & The Bad Seeds)	Nick Cave (as Nicholas Edward Cage), Mick Harvey & Thomas Wydler	6:11
14.	"Right Now" (performed by Hugo Basclain)	Hugo Basclain, The Gifted (as Louis Castle & James Bairian)	3:15
15.	"Same Squad" (performed by P-Lo)	P-Lo (as Paulo Ytienza Rodriguez)	2:31
16.	"Still Alive" (performed by Demi Lovato)	Demi Lovato, Mike Shinoda & Laura Veltz	2:58
Total length:			55:31

== See also ==
- Music of the Scream franchise
