= Still Alive (Demi Lovato song) =

2023 single by Demi Lovato

Single by Demi Lovato

from the album Scream VI
- Released: March 3, 2023
- Genre: Pop-punk; pop rock
- Length: 3:05
- Label: DLG Recordings, LLC; Island
- Songwriters: Demi Lovato; Laura Veltz; Mike Shinoda
- Producer: Mike Shinoda

Demi Lovato singles chronology
"29" (2022)	"Still Alive" (2023)	"Heart Attack (Rock Version)" (2023)

Music video
- "Still Alive" on YouTube

"Still Alive" is a song recorded by the American singer Demi Lovato for the soundtrack to the 2023 slasher film Scream VI. She wrote it along with Laura Veltz and Linkin Park's Mike Shinoda, while the latter handled its production. Island Records released the song digitally on March 3, 2023, while Universal Music Group sent it to Italian radio airplay as the lead single from the soundtrack. It marked Lovato's first music release since her return to rock-infused styles with her eighth studio album, Holy Fvck (2022). A pop-punk and pop rock song driven by electric guitars, "Still Alive" contains lyrics about surviving through a living hell.

Upon release, "Still Alive" received positive reviews from music critics and received a nomination at the 2023 MTV Movie & TV Awards for Best Song. Commercially, the single appeared on secondary charts in the Czech Republic, the United Kingdom, and the United States. A horror film-themed music video for "Still Alive", directed by Jensen Noen, premiered on the same date as the single's release. It intersperses scenes from the film with clips of Lovato and a group of friends fighting off Ghostface. The video ends with a confirmation that the entire plot was part of a movie.

== Background and release ==
Demi Lovato returned to pop-punk and rock-infused music with the release of her eighth studio album, Holy Fvck, in August 2022. It became Lovato's eighth consecutive top ten album in the United States, and topped three Billboard charts. In February 2023, fans began to speculate about Lovato's possible involvement in the soundtrack to the slasher film Scream VI (2023). She replied with an eye emoji to a tweet claiming the release of "Still Alive", although without confirming anything. The singer hinted at the song's release after sharing a phone number and a link that led to a Ghostface intro, played by Roger L. Jackson, and a teaser of "Still Alive".

On February 15, 2023, Lovato announced the release of "Still Alive" on social media. She also shared its cover artwork, which shows the singer with a dagger reflecting the image of Ghostface. In a press release, she said: "I couldn't think of a more perfect home for 'Still Alive' than within the Scream universe, I'm a huge fan of the films, so it's an honor to contribute to such an iconic horror franchise". On the following day, Lovato posted an snippet of the song on her TikTok account, and received positive reception from fans. Island Records released "Still Alive" as the lead single from the album on March 3, 2023, while Universal Music Group sent it to Italian radio airplay.

== Composition ==
"Still Alive" has a duration of three minutes and five seconds. Lovato, Laura Veltz, and Linkin Park's co-founder Mike Shinoda wrote the track, while the latter produced it. Shinoda was also in charge of its programming and was the recording engineer. Manny Marroquin and Chris Gehringer served as the mixing engineer and mastering engineer, respectively. Music critics categorized "Still Alive" as a pop-punk and pop rock song that followed Lovato's return to these music styles in 2022. The song incorporates sludge metal guitars, drum patterns, and other characteristics of the genre.

In the lyrics of the track, Lovato expresses about surviving through a living hell. The chorus' lyrics ("Already died a thousand times / Went to hell but I’m back and I’m breathing / Make me bleed while my heart is still beating / Still alive") were compared by Billboard's Lars Brandle to Lovato's 2018 drug overdose, in which she "came very close to losing it all."

== Reception ==
Following the song's release, Adrianne Reece of Elite Daily said that it felt like an outtake track from Holy Fvck. The critic also wrote that the song served as a "sickening reminder" that Lovato belongs in punk rock, described its lyrics as "tantalizing", and said that Lovato showcases her strength throughout the track. Emily Carter of Kerrang! believed that the song was "more of the same" following the singer's previous album. Billboard's Stephen Daw included "Still Alive" on a list of Best Queer Releases of the Week, and described the song as a masterclass, and "an excellent addition" to Lovato's rock catalog. At the 2023 MTV Movie & TV Awards, it received a nomination for the category Best Song; it lost to Taylor Swift's "Carolina" (2022).

Commercially, "Still Alive" appeared on secondary charts in three countries. In the United States, it peaked within the top five on two Billboard digital charts, Alternative Digital Song Sales (at number 2) and Rock Digital Song Sales (at number 4). The song reached number 20 on the Rádio – Top 100 chart in the Czech Republic, and number 55 on the UK Singles Downloads Chart and UK Singles Sales Chart.

== Music video ==
The music video for "Still Alive" premiered on Lovato's Vevo channel on the same date as the single's release. Directed by Jensen Noen, it features cameos by Shinoda and Spencer Charnas of Ice Nine Kills; the latter stated that he was "honoured" to have a cameo in a video for "one of [his] all time favourite movie franchises".

The video starts with Lovato showing up at a hotel with a group of friends. She hands an invitation to a hotel worker, that reads "Do you like scary movies?." Lovato and her friends sit down for a screening of the film. The video also contains scenes taken from the film starring characters portrayed by Sam Carpenter (Melissa Barrera), Tara Carpenter (Jenna Ortega), Mindy Meeks-Martin (Jasmin Savoy Brown), Chad Meeks-Martin (Mason Gooding), Anika Kayoko (Devyn Nekoda), and Gale Weathers (Courteney Cox). The screening stops and the person in charge of it, drops dead and Ghostface appears to attack Lovato and her friends as they try to fight off him and escape. By the end of the video, Lovato manages to finish off the villain and it ends up being that it was all part of the screening.

== Charts ==
Chart performance for "Still Alive"
Chart (2023)	Peak position
Czech Republic Airplay (ČNS IFPI)	20
UK Singles Downloads (OCC)	55
UK Singles Sales (OCC)	55
US Alternative Digital Song Sales (Billboard)	2
US Rock Digital Song Sales (Billboard)	4

== Release history ==
Release dates and format(s) for "Still Alive"
Region	Date	Format(s)	Label	Ref.
Various	March 3, 2023	Digital download; streaming	Island	
Italy	March 3, 2023	Radio airplay	Universal	
