= Peaches (Jack Black song) =

2023 single by Jack Black

Single by Jack Black (credited as Bowser)

from the album The Super Mario Bros. Movie (Original Motion Picture Soundtrack)
- Released: April 7, 2023
- Recorded: 2022
- Genre: Pop; comedy
- Length: 1:35
- Label: Back Lot; iam8bit; Columbia
- Songwriters: Jack Black; Aaron Horvath; Michael Jelenic; Eric Osmond; John Spiker
- Producer: John Spiker

Jack Black singles chronology
"5 Needs" (2020)	"Peaches" (2023)	"Video Games" (2023)

Music videos
- Jack Black – Peaches (Directed by Cole Bennett) on YouTube
- Bowser – Peaches (Official Music Video) on YouTube

"Peaches" is a song by American actor and musician Jack Black from the Nintendo/Illumination film The Super Mario Bros. Movie, in which he voices Bowser. The song was released as a single alongside the soundtrack on April 7, 2023.

== Concept ==
The song is a sentimental ballad in which Bowser, Jack Black's character in The Super Mario Bros. Movie, expresses his love for Princess Peach.

The film's initial draft did not incorporate a musical background for Bowser. Aaron Horvath, one of the film's co-directors, told GameSpot he wanted a musical Bowser, but planned for a more metal track in the vein of Tenacious D. After deciding that it would be boring for Bowser to simply say, "I love Princess Peach", Horvath decided to tell the song through a ballad. The original demo was recorded with Eric Osmond on vocals. Two days later, Black completed the final recording of the song with an original piano track by his pianist.

== Music videos ==
The song received two official music videos. The first one was a live-action music video directed by Cole Bennett, depicting Jack Black wearing a Bowser-inspired costume and playing the song on the piano while in a room with windows overlooking computer-animated landscapes from the film. The video was uploaded by Lyrical Lemonade the same day as the single's release. On the same day, a behind-the-scenes video was posted on Lyrical Lemonade's secondary channel. On April 10, the music video reached No. 2 on YouTube's trending page.

The second video features clips of Bowser performing the song on his piano from the actual film, as well as other clips. It was uploaded by Illumination on April 10, 2023.

Cover versions

On May 5, 2023, American actress and musician Cristina Vee recorded a cover version of "Peaches" rewritten to be sung by Bowsette instead of Bowser and titled "Peaches (Bowsette version)", with the music video featuring Vee herself as Bowsette.

== Reception ==
The song was considered to be the highlight of the film by several critics. Owen Gleiberman of Variety praised Black's performance as Bowser, especially through "Peaches". He compared the song to Meat Loaf's songs on Bat Out of Hell, and further compared Black to Meat Loaf and Tom Jones. Kristin Smith of Plugged In praised the live-action music video, writing, "it's an innocent, silly ballad...with flashy colors and plenty of fun to (they hope) entice viewers to go see The Super Mario Bros. Movie." Comic Book Resources listed the song as the best song from the film, writing, "the best part of the song is Jack Black, who sounds like he's giving the performance of his life as the love-struck Koopa King". In a positive review of the film, Christopher Cruz of Rolling Stone called the song a "hit", expecting it to be "a TikTok staple to the chagrin of parents everywhere." Kristy Puchko of Mashable, who gave the film a generally negative review, wrote, "All my gripes about this movie were silenced during the interludes when Black lets loose in all his rock star might to sing, "Peaches, Peaches, Peaches, Peaches, Peaches," over and over". Reflecting on this and other Bowser scenes in the film, she commented, "…[the] balance of stupid and fun are perfect."

Conversely, Brian Tallerico of RogerEbert.com, a self-described lifelong Mario fan who criticized the film for lacking in creativity, called the song "truly uninspired", opining that "How on Earth a film like this gets a rock talent like half of Tenacious D and doesn't let him unleash a few clever Bowser tunes is one of this film's many mysteries."

== Live performances ==
During the final night of its North American leg of Five Albums. One Night. The World Tour, Black performed the song live on stage in Brooklyn, in which the Jonas Brothers invited him to perform on stage, at the intermission. Black also performed the song as the finale for the Game Awards 10-Year Concert at the Hollywood Bowl.

== Accolades ==
The song was eligible for the Academy Award for Best Original Song at the 96th Academy Awards, but it was not shortlisted. In December 2023, the song became nominated for the Golden Globe Award for Best Original Song for the 81st Golden Globe Awards.

Awards
Award	Year (Note: Indicates the year of ceremony. Each year is linked to the article about the awards held that year, wherever possible.)	Category	Result
Hollywood Music in Media Awards	2023	Best Original Song in an Animated Film	Nominated
Golden Globe Awards	2024	Best Original Song	Nominated
Critics' Choice Movie Awards	2024	Best Song	Nominated

== Commercial performance ==
The song reached number 56 on the US Billboard Hot 100 after debuting at number 83, making it Black's first solo single to chart. The song also reached the top 40 in Australia, the Netherlands, New Zealand, and the United Kingdom.

== Charts ==
Chart performance for "Peaches"
Chart (2023)	Peak position
Australia (ARIA)	91
Canada Hot 100 (Billboard)	52
Global 200 (Billboard)	48
Ireland (IRMA)	41
Netherlands (Single Tip)	4
New Zealand Hot Singles (RMNZ)	13
UK Singles (Official Charts)	28
UK Indie (Official Charts)	3
US Billboard Hot 100	56

== Certifications ==
Region	Certification	Certified units/sales
United States (RIAA)	Platinum	1,000,000^{‡}
^{‡} Sales+streaming figures based on certification alone.
