= There's a Girl =

Single by Trent Harmon

from the album You Got 'Em All
- Released: June 23, 2016
- Recorded: 2016
- Genre: Country
- Length: 3:36
- Label: Big Machine; 19
- Songwriter(s): Trent Harmon; Jimmy Robbins; Laura Veltz
- Producer(s): Jimmy Robbins

Trent Harmon singles chronology
"Falling" (2016)	"There's a Girl" (2016)	"You Got 'em All" (2018)

"There's a Girl" is a song co-written and recorded by American country music artist and American Idol season fifteen winner Trent Harmon. It is the first single from his debut studio album You Got 'Em All. The song was written by Harmon Jimmy Robbins, and Laura Veltz, and was produced by Robbins.

== Background ==
The song was written by Harmon with Jimmy Robbins and Laura Veltz. According to Harmon, the song was inspired by a few different relationships he had. Initially they were writing a sad ballad about a girl whom he had traveled around the southern United States for, but who also broke his heart. However, Harmon decided to change it to an upbeat song, and said: "Let’s just write it happy. Let’s flip all this and kind of make fun of me and make fun of myself for all the stupid stuff I did." The song was released on for sales on June 23, 2016, and to radio on July 18, 2016.

== Commercial performance ==
The song debuted on the Country Digital Songs chart at No. 48, selling 7,000 copies in its first week of release. After it was released to country radio in July 2016, it entered the Country Airplay on chart date of August 6, 2016 at No. 53, and the Hot Country Songs at No. 50 a month later. The song has sold 69,000 copies in the US as of March 2017.

== Music video ==
The video was directed by Roman White and premiered on July 11, 2016. It features Harmon traveling a long way by car, motorcycle and bike, and on foot to see a girl.

== Chart performance ==
=== Weekly charts ===
Chart (2016–2017)	Peak position
US Country Airplay (Billboard)	18
US Hot Country Songs (Billboard)	27

=== Year-end charts ===
Chart (2017)	Position
US Hot Country Songs (Billboard)	74
