= Falling (Trent Harmon song) =

Single by Trent Harmon
- Released: April 6, 2016
- Recorded: 2016
- Genre: Country
- Length: 3:18
- Label: Big Machine Records, 19
- Songwriters: Keith Urban, Dallas Davidson, Brett James
- Producer: Julian Raymond

Trent Harmon singles chronology
"Falling" (2016)	"There's a Girl" (2016)

"Falling" is the debut single by American Idol season fifteen winner Trent Harmon and is also his coronation song from the contest. It was co-written by singer songwriter and American Idol judge Keith Urban with Dallas Davidson and Brett James.

== Background ==
It was co-written by singer songwriter and American Idol judge Keith Urban with Dallas Davidson and Brett James. Urban originally had written the song for himself but was later asked by the producers if the song could be given to Harmon as his potential winner's single. Urban agreed to the suggestion and gave the single Harmon as his coronation song. The single was described as a "bluesy jam which allowed Harmon to show off his falsetto". Harmon first heard the song the day after making Idol's top three. The song was released for sale a day prior to the Grand Final performance night on April 7, 2016.

== Commercial performance ==
"Falling" debuted on the iTunes Top 100 chart at number 48 on April 6, 2016 a day ahead of the Grand Final performance show. After Harmon's debut performance of the song the next day, it climbed up the charts reaching the Top 15; however he was noticeably behind fellow finalist MacKenzie Bourg's single "Roses" which at the time was at number 5. The following day after Harmon was announced as the season fifteen winner of American Idol the single climbed further up the charts peaking at number 3.The single also peaked at number 1 on the iTunes Top 100 pop songs chart. The song also charted in Canada, New Zealand and Australia's iTunes's Top 100 chart. The song debuted at number 48 on the Billboard's Digital Songs chart and at 33 on the Country Singles chart. "Falling" also charted at 4 on the Country Digital Songs chart. The song sold 23,000 copies in its first chart week, based on just two days of sales. It sold a further 28,000 copies the following week, making a total of 52,000 sold.

== Charts ==
Chart (2016)	Peak position
US Digital Song Sales (Billboard)	31
US Bubbling Under Hot 100 (Billboard)	16
US Hot Country Songs (Billboard)	27
