= Amen (Edens Edge song) =

Single by Edens Edge

from the album Edens Edge
- Released: March 28, 2011
- Genre: Country
- Length: 3:48
- Label: Big Machine
- Songwriters: Skip Black; Hannah Blaylock; Catt Gravitt; Gerald O'Brien
- Producer: Mark Bright

Edens Edge singles chronology
"Amen" (2011)	"Too Good to Be True" (2012)

"Amen" is a song written by Skip Black, Hannah Blaylock, Catt Gravitt and Gerald O'Brien, and recorded by American country music group Edens Edge. It was released in March 2011 as their debut single and the first from their self-titled album for Big Machine Records.

== Critical reception ==
Matt Bjorke of Roughstock gave the song three and a half stars out of five, calling it an "immediately likable song with a simple yet memorable chorus and a classic-sounding country melody and vocal." Kevin John Coyne of Country Universe gave the song a B+, writing that the vocals "complement the music nicely, and don’t get in the way of telling the story."

== Music video ==
The music video was directed by Roman White and premiered in May 2011.

== Chart performance ==
"Amen" debuted at number 60 on the U.S. Billboard Hot Country Songs chart for the week of April 9, 2011. It also debuted at number 99 on the U.S. Billboard Hot 100 chart for the week of December 24, 2011.

Chart (2011–2012)	Peak position
US Billboard Hot 100	83
US Hot Country Songs (Billboard)	18

=== Year-end charts ===
Chart (2011)	Position
US Country Songs (Billboard)	83

Chart (2012)	Position
US Country Songs (Billboard)	78
