= Music of the Scream franchise =

Film franchise soundtrack album list

The Scream slasher franchise has generated several soundtrack albums. American composer Marco Beltrami composed the film scores for the first four films in the series and the seventh film, while Brian Tyler has composed the fifth and sixth films with co-composer Sven Faulconer who did the latter. Jeremy Zuckerman who composed the television series based on the film series.

== Scream (1996) ==
The original soundtrack for Scream was released on December 17, 1996, by TVT Records, and features 11 songs and a piece from the film's musical score. Most of the tracks heard are appeared in various scenes in the film, especially the Alice Cooper version of "School's Out" appeared in the film following the closure of Woodsboro high school, but it was replaced with a cover version of the song by The Last Hard Men on the album. An acoustic cover of Blue Öyster Cult's "Don't Fear the Reaper", performed by Gus Black, plays softly in the background while Sidney and Billy discuss their relationship. The song was also one of the few songs featured in John Carpenter's Halloween, a film to which Scream makes repeated homage. The song "Red Right Hand" by Nick Cave and the Bad Seeds, heard in the first film, is also used in Scream 2, Scream 3 and Scream (2022). Nick Cave performs a version of the track written specifically for Scream 3 in that film. An alternate version of the music video "Drop Dead Gorgeous" by Republica, featuring clips from the film, was shown on music networks such as MTV. Although the song can be heard in the film, it is only included in the European edition of the soundtrack album. The song was also used in one of the film's television commercials.

The Scream score by Marco Beltrami was released by Varèse Sarabande on July 14, 1998, on a CD titled "Scream/Scream 2", which also contained tracks from the score of Scream 2. The release consisted of only six tracks—"Sidney's Lament", "Altered Ego", "A Cruel World", "Trouble in Woodsboro", "Chasing Sidney", and "NC-17"—with a runtime of only 12 minutes, compared to over an hour of music made for the film and the more common 30–45 minutes of music found in other original scores. Some reviewers felt the restricted runtime was a result of the high cost of releasing a composer's music commercially, combined with Varèse Sarabande's unwillingness to pay. The track "NC-17" was named after the censorship battles over the film.

== Scream 2 (1997) ==
The original soundtrack for Scream 2 was released November 18, 1997, by Capitol Records, that consisted of 15 songs by various artists from the R&B, rap and rock genres, all but two of which – "One More Chance" and "The Race" – appear in the film. The album spent ten weeks on the Billboard 200, rising as high as #50, performing significantly better than the Scream original soundtrack which never charted, and was certified gold by the Recording Industry Association of America, signifying that the album achieved sales in excess of 500,000 units. Only one song featured in the film did not appear on the album, the original work, "Take Away the Fear", written and performed by Craven's own daughter Jessica Craven and Mike Mancini, which plays on a TV during an early scene in a sorority house involving Sarah Michelle Gellar. The Scream 2 original score was, as in Scream, developed by Marco Beltrami and was released on July 14, 1998, by Varèse Sarabande on a CD which also contained tracks from the score of Scream entitled "Scream/Scream 2". The commercially released score for both films was found to be lacking many pieces heard in either film, consisting of only nine tracks – "Stage Fright Requiem", "Love Turns Sour", "Cici Creepies", "Deputy for a Friend", "Hollow Parting", "Dewpoint/Stabbed", "Hairtrigger Lunatic", "Sundown Search" and "It's Over, Sid" – with a runtime of only 17 minutes, compared to nearly 90 minutes of score developed for the film and the more common 30–45 minutes of music found in other original scores. The release was also found to be missing the track "Cassandra Aria" by Danny Elfman, described by soundtrack-review site Filmtracks as "a frenzied, choral-enhanced three minutes". The length of the released score was considered disappointing with some reviews considering the track omissions the result of the high fees required to be paid to composers in order to release their music commercially. The influence of several other famous composers could be heard in the score including Hans Zimmer, Elliot Goldenthal, Ennio Morricone and Christopher Young. In particular excerpts of the Hans Zimmer's score to Broken Arrow, particularly the tracks "Brothers" and "Secure", featuring guitar work by Duane Eddy, would become a component of the theme tune of the character Dewey Riley.

== Scream 3 (2000) ==
The Scream 3 original soundtrack was released on January 25, 2000, by Wind-up Records featuring 18 songs consisting largely of the metal genre by artists such as System of a Down and Powerman 5000, some of which are represented in the film. The album fared better than its predecessors, spending fourteen weeks on the Billboard 200 and reaching a top rank of #32; it was further certified gold by the Recording Industry Association of America, signifying that the album achieved sales in excess of 500,000 units. The album was released on iTunes on February 1, 2012.

The Scream 3 score was again helmed by Marco Beltrami who employed seven orchestrators and experimented with the recording of instruments in unusual circumstances such as physically and electronically altering the traditional sound of a piano while continuing to include a heavy vocal orchestra in his tracks There was consideration that Beltrami was forced to hire multiple orchestrators to complete the score to meet the film's deadline. Like previous scores in the series, the Scream 3 score was released by Varèse Sarabande on February 29, 2000, with a total length of 33 minutes of music, though the album was again found to be missing certain sections of the score utilized within the film. Beltrami took inspiration from other composers for the score, again incorporating excerpts of the score to Broken Arrow by Hans Zimmer in the track "Sid Wears a Dress". Music guide Allmusic awarded the Scream 3 score 2.5 out of 5.

== Scream 4 (2011) ==
The Scream 4: Original Motion Picture Soundtrack was released on April 12, 2011, by Lakeshore Records. The soundtrack features 12 songs performed by various artists mainly of the rock genre, such as Ida Maria, The Sounds and The Novocaines.

A score soundtrack was also released, on April 19, 2011, by Varèse Sarabande. The Scream 4 score was yet again developed by Marco Beltrami.

== Scream (2022) ==
The Scream (2022) soundtrack consists of 15 songs primarily of the pop, alternative, and hip-hop genres and featuring artists such as Kim Petras, DJ Khaled, and Santigold. The soundtrack received positive reviews, with Joséphine Michele of Screen Rant describing it as matching the tone of the Scream films perfectly while still feeling modern, saying "the movie itself takes heavy inspiration from the first film, but Scream (2022) ups the gore and violence, and the soundtrack brings it into the 2020s."

The fifth film's score soundtrack was released on January 7, 2022, by Varèse Sarabande. The score was developed by Brian Tyler, making it the first film in the franchise with a score that was not created by Marco Beltrami, who composed the score for the previous four films. Tyler had previously worked with Matt Bettinelli-Olpin and Tyler Gillett on Ready or Not.

== Scream VI (2023) ==
Scream VI was scored by Brian Tyler and Sven Faulconer. Tyler returned from the previous installment, and in January 2023, it was announced that Sven Faulconer joined to co-score the film.

== Scream 7 (2026) ==
Scream 7 was scored by Marco Beltrami again, who previously worked on Craven's first four films, has returned to work on the soundtrack. In August 2025, Beltrami shared videos on his Instagram from a recording studio in Budapest, Hungary, where he worked with an orchestra. It is known that the soundtrack will include both completely new compositions and the return of the classic themes of the franchise, including "Sidney's Lament", as well as its orchestral reworking called "Mrs. Evans Lament". The film's score album was released on May 22, 2026 by Lakeshore Records.

== Scream television series ==
Two official soundtrack albums for the Scream television series on MTV have been released. The first season's soundtrack was released on August 14, 2015, under Columbia Records. The second season's soundtrack was released on July 29, 2016, under Island Records. The score soundtrack for the series' first two seasons composed by Jeremy Zuckerman, was released by Lakeshore Records on October 28, 2016.

Scream: Music from Season One
No.	Title	Artist	Length
1.	"Mine"	Phoebe Ryan	3:46
2.	"When I Rule the World"	Liz	3:07
3.	"You're the Best"	Wet	2:57
4.	"Monsters"	Ruelle	3:12
5.	"All the Things Lost"	MS MR	3:14
6.	"Set This Heart on Fire"	machineheart	3:28
7.	"Rescue My Heart"	Liz Longley	3:18
8.	"Star Spangled"	REMMI	3:01
9.	"Spectacular Rival"	George Ezra	4:15
10.	"There's a Ghost"	Fleurie	3:11
Total length:			33:29

Scream: Music from Season Two
No.	Title	Artist	Length
1.	"River"	Bishop Briggs	3:34
2.	"I Took a Pill in Ibiza" (Seeb Remix)	Mike Posner	3:15
3.	"Money"	Poppy	3:10
4.	"One in a Million" (Kant Remix)	Midnight To Monaco	5:50
5.	"Hurts So Good"	Astrid S	3:28
6.	"Breathe" (featuring Neev)	Seeb	3:58
7.	"Make Them Wheels Roll"	Safia	4:05
8.	"In the Arms of a Stranger" (Brian Kierulf Remix)	Mike Posner	3:26
9.	"Figure You Out"	Keke Palmer	3:25
Total length:			34:11
