= Trent Harmon =

American country music singer (born 1990)

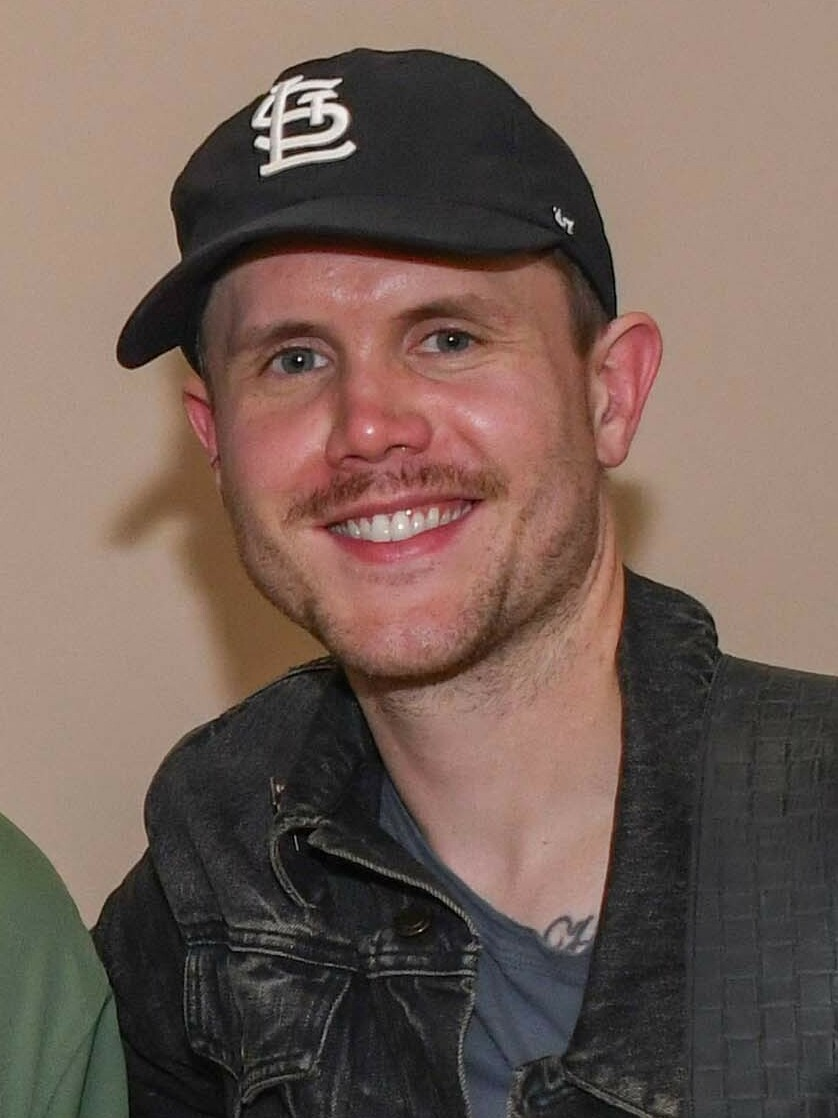
- Harmon in 2022

Background information
- Born: Trenton William Harmon; October 8, 1990 (age 36); Amory, Mississippi, U.S.
- Genres: Country; pop; soul
- Occupations: Singer; songwriter
- Instruments: Vocals; piano; guitar; drums
- Years active: 2016–present
- Labels: Big Machine Records; 19 Recordings

Trenton William Harmon (born October 8, 1990) is an American country music singer who won the fifteenth season of American Idol on April 7, 2016.

== Early life and education ==
Harmon was born in Amory, Mississippi to Cindy and Randy Harmon and is the second cousin of Richard Harmon, who is an actor. His mother taught him to sing "Amazing Grace" when he was five and he grew up singing in church. His family owns a farm and a yard-to-table restaurant, Longhorn, where he was a waiter. He credits his upbringing on the farm and working in the restaurant for his strong work ethic.

Trent Harmon sang and performed in a number of musicals while attending Amory High School. He attended the University of Arkansas at Monticello leading on-campus worship services. He first learned to play the piano and progressed to playing drums and guitar.

== Music career ==
Harmon's first major audition was in May 2014, when a close friend convinced him to try out for The Voice in New Orleans. After singing "Stay with Me" by Sam Smith for a casting director, he was one of 300 open audition contestants chosen to advance from a field of 32,000. The show flew him to Los Angeles and he sang "Jealous" by Nick Jonas. In October 2014 he flew to Los Angeles again for several weeks to be filmed for the show although no judge selected him and his audition did not air. Harmon later said that the rejection prepared him for his 'Idol' phase of his career.

=== American Idol ===
Harmon auditioned for American Idol in Little Rock, Arkansas, in August 2015. He told the judges about growing up on a farm and sang "Unaware", a r&b song by Allen Stone. Harmon was the first r&b singer shown to be accepted by the judges for the season. Later in the season it was revealed that Harmon kept a leather-bound journal writing down every comment and criticism the judges gave him.

During Hollywood week he was encouraged to quit when diagnosed with mono and sequestered in a bathroom for most of that week, to keep the contagious disease from spreading. He impressed the judges in an 'Idol' first when he performed the group round as a soloist. During "Idol Grammy Hits" week Harmon was coached to bring the "strange faces he makes when he sings" under control. Judge Harry Connick Jr. noted that Harmon lost an "exaggerated jaw vibrato" which eventually caused him to temporarily lose his singing voice.

Harmon won the fifteenth season of American Idol on April 7, 2016. His coronation single, "Falling", was written by American Idol judge Keith Urban with Dallas Davidson and Brett James. For winning the title, Harmon received a Ford car and a recording contract with Big Machine Records. La'Porsha Renae was named runner-up. Harmon parted ways with Big Machine in May 2019.

==== Performances ====
Week	Theme	Song(s)	Original artist(s)	Result
Auditions	Contestant's choice	"Unaware"	Allen Stone	Advanced
Hollywood Week	Lines of 10	"Lay Me Down"	Sam Smith	Advanced
Hollywood Week	Group rounds*	"Rather Be"	Clean Bandit ft. Jess Glynne	Advanced
Hollywood Week	Final judgment	"Tiny Dancer"	Elton John	Advanced
Top 24	Contestant's choice	"What Are You Listening To"	Chris Stapleton	Advanced
Top 10	Contestant's choice	"Like I Can"	Sam Smith	Safe
Top 8	Idol Grammy hits	"When a Man Loves a Woman"	Percy Sledge	Safe
Top 6	American Idol all time songbook	"See You Again" (duet with La'Porsha Renae)	Wiz Khalifa and Charlie Puth	Safe
Top 6	American Idol all time songbook	"Stand by Me"	Ben E. King	Safe
Top 5	America's Twitter song choice	"Counting Stars"	OneRepublic	Safe
Top 5	America's Twitter song choice	"Simple Man"	Lynyrd Skynyrd	Safe
Top 4	Classic Rock / Sia	"Sharp Dressed Man"	ZZ Top	Safe
Top 4	Classic Rock / Sia	"Chandelier"	Sia	Safe
Top 3	Hometown dedication	"Tennessee Whiskey"	Chris Stapleton	Safe
Top 3	Scott Borchetta's choice	"Drink You Away"	Justin Timberlake	Safe
Top 3	Judges' choice	"Waiting Game"	Parson James	Safe
Top 2	Winner's single	"Falling"	Trent Harmon	Winner
Top 2	Simon Fuller's choice	"If You Don't Know Me by Now"	Harold Melvin & the Blue Notes	Winner
Top 2	Favorite performance	"Chandelier"	Sia	Winner
Finale	Finale show	"It Takes Two" (duet with La'Porsha Renae)	Marvin Gaye and Kim Weston	Winner
Finale	Winner's song	"Falling"	Trent Harmon	Winner

=== Post-Idol ===
After winning American Idol Harmon was signed by Big Machine Records. His first album has country and indie soul influences. Big Machine's Scott Borchetta said that it would be like a country album Justin Timberlake would make. In a post-show interview Harmon was asked his thoughts on Mississippi's anti-LGBT "Religious Liberty" legislation (HB1523) which allows people and businesses to deny service to LGBT people. He recounted that in the restaurant business, he served whomever walked in the door: "I think that you should treat all people equally and respectfully, and that's what I do, and that's what I'm going to continue to do no matter what law is passed."

In December 2016, Harmon released his self-titled EP which features his Top 30 hit "There's a Girl" and four other tracks. During 2017, Harmon experienced a personal breakup, his record label folding, and its parent company's restructuring leaving his contract in limbo. By the end of 2016, he and BMLG resolved their issues.

In February 2018, Harmon premiered the single "You Got 'Em All", the title track from his debut album, released on May 18, 2018. On September 6, 2019, he and Kathleen Couch married. In February 2021, he released a new single dedicated to her, "She's My Heaven". They welcomed their daughter in 2023.

On May 30, 2025, he released a Christian music EP, Scars & Sins.

== Discography ==
=== Albums ===
Title	Album details	Peak chart positions		Sales
Title	Album details	US Country	US Heat	Sales
You Got 'Em All	Released: May 18, 2018; Format: Compact disc, digital download; Label: Big Machine Label Group	34	2	US: 4,500

=== Extended plays ===
Title	Details
Trent Harmon	Released: December 9, 2016; Format: Digital download; Label: 19 Recordings
Scars & Sins	Released: May 30, 2025; Format: Digital download; Label: Soul Chaser LLC

=== Singles ===
Year	Single	Peak chart positions			Sales	Album
Year	Single	US Country	US Country Airplay	US Bubbling	Sales	Album
2016	"Falling"	27	—	16	US: 52,000	Trent Harmon
2016	"There's a Girl"	27	18	—	US: 69,000	Trent Harmon
2018	"You Got 'Em All"	—	38	—		You Got ‘Em All
2021	"She's My Heaven"	—	—	—		Non-album single

=== Music videos ===
Year	Video	Director
2016	"There's a Girl"	Roman White
2018	"You Got 'Em All"	James King

== See also ==
- List of Idols winners
