= Edens Edge =

American county music band

- Origin: Russellville, Arkansas; United States
- Genres: Country
- Years active: 2006–13
- Labels: Big Machine
- Past members: Hannah Blaylock; Dean Berner; Cherrill Green

Edens Edge was an American country music band founded by Hannah Blaylock (lead vocals), Dean Berner (vocals, guitar, Dobro), and Cherrill Green (vocals, mandolin, banjo, guitar). The band was signed to Big Machine Records, which released their self-titled debut album. It included the singles "Amen" and "Too Good to Be True". The group disbanded in 2013 when Blaylock departed.

== History ==
All three members of Edens Edge are natives of Arkansas. They won a contest sponsored by CMT in 2006, where they met Nashville songwriter Kye Fleming. They moved to Nashville in 2007. The group eventually signed a record deal with Big Machine Records in April 2010, and the trio's debut single, "Amen," was released in April 2011. It has become the group's first Top 20 hit. Their self-titled debut album was released on June 12, 2012. "Too Good to Be True" was released as the album's second and final single on April 9, 2012.

In March 2013, it was announced that Edens Edge had parted ways with Big Machine Records and that member Hannah Blaylock had left the band. Blaylock auditioned for The Voice in 2018 but failed to make a team.

== Discography ==
=== Studio albums ===
Title	Details	Peak chart positions	
Title	Details	US Country	US
Edens Edge	Release date: June 12, 2012; Label: Big Machine Records	9	51

=== EPs ===
Title	Details	Peak positions
Title	Details	US Heat
Edens Edge	Release date: May 24, 2011; Label: Big Machine Records	43

=== Singles ===
Year	Single	Peak chart positions		Album
Year	Single	US Country	US	Album
2011	"Amen"	18	83	Edens Edge
2012	"Too Good to Be True"	27	—	Edens Edge
"—" denotes releases that did not chart

=== Other charted songs ===
Year	Single	Peak positions	Album
Year	Single	US Country	Album
2012	"O Holy Night"	59	The Country Christmas Collection

=== Music videos ===
Year	Title	Director
2011	"Amen"	Roman White
2012	"Too Good to Be True"	Peter Zavadil
