= Callista Clark =

American country singer

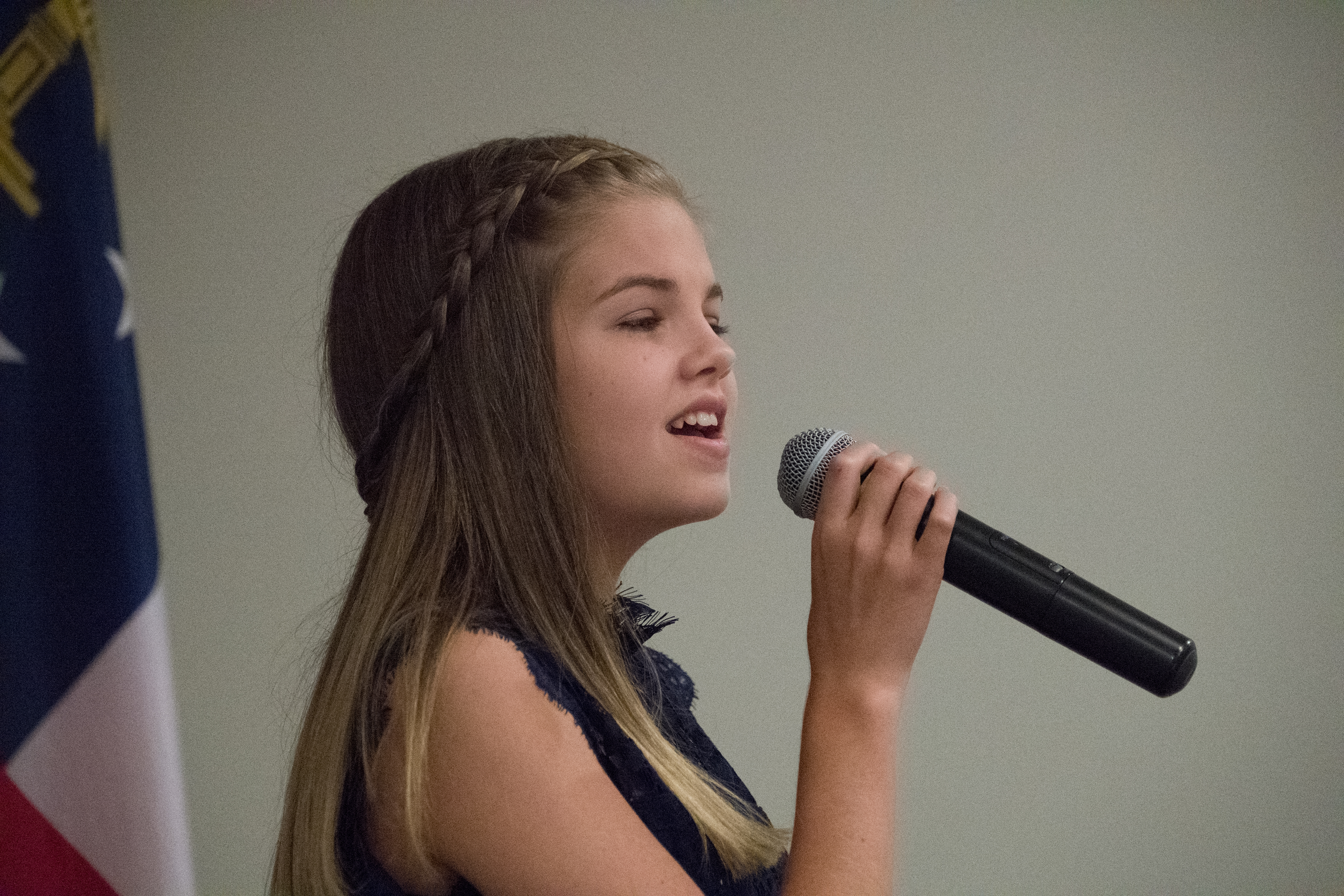
- Callista Clark singing the national anthem at age 13

Background information
- Born: Callista Renee Clark; September 29, 2003 (age 23)
- Origin: Zebulon, Georgia
- Occupation: Country singer
- Years active: 2021–present
- Label: Big Machine
- Website: https://callistaclark.com/

Callista Renee Clark (born September 29, 2003) is an American country music singer from Zebulon, Georgia. She released her debut EP, Real to Me, on February 12, 2021, with the EP's lead single "It's 'Cause I Am" peaking at No. 30 on the Billboard Hot Country Songs chart.

== Early life ==
Callista Clark was born on September 29, 2003. Raised in Zebulon, Georgia, Clark claims she was "singing since I could talk", and that the first place she ever sang was at a church where her grandfather was a pastor. Clark told Songwriter Universe that she learned ukulele at the age of 10, and began playing the guitar at the age of 11, later learning more instruments such as the piano. In an interview with iHeartRadio, Clark said that she wrote her first song at the age of 11, initially as a poem in a school poetry contest, which was called "Wildfire". At the age of 12, Clark performed with Jennifer Nettles at a 4-H event. She gained fame with a cover of Creedence Clearwater Revival's "Have You Ever Seen the Rain? posted on Facebook, which received 29 million views. She signed with Big Machine Records at the age of 15.

== Career ==
Callista Clark released her first EP on February 12, 2021 with Big Machine Records, entitled Real to Me. Clark co-wrote all 5 songs on the EP, which was produced by Nathan Chapman. "It's 'Cause I Am" impacted country radio as the EP's lead single on March 29, 2021. "It's 'Cause I Am" was described by Billboard critic Tom Roland as "mining the clash between others' perception of her outward teen appearance and her inner reality", calling her voice's timbre "older than her chronological age". The song reached as high as 22 on the Billboard Country Airplay chart. In an interview with Country Now on May 19, 2021, Clark said that she had "tons of songs from [the beginning of her career] to where I am now that I'm just dying to put out", hinting towards the possible release of new music. On July 30, 2021, Clark debuted at the Grand Ole Opry. She shared the news on her Instagram page on July 16, writing that "this is an absolute dream come true". Clark will be opening on the majority of dates of Chris Young's Famous Friends tour. On October 14, 2022, Clark released her debut album Real to Me: The Way I Feel.

=== Musical influences ===
Callista Clark has said that, while growing up, she listened to country music from the 1980s and the 1990s, citing artists such as Travis Tritt, Randy Travis and The Judds as inspirations, also mentioning that she was a fan of Ingrid Andress' songwriting and confidence. Clark has named Luke Combs and Thomas Rhett as musicians that she admires, saying that "it would mean the world to me to be successful as a writer of my own songs and even for other artists, just like [Combs and Rhett] do". Clark stated in an interview that she "grew up singing LeAnn Rimes and Taylor Swift songs and admired them in their careers".

== Discography ==
=== Albums ===
| Title | Details |
|---|---|
| Real to Me: The Way I Feel | Released: October 14, 2022; Label: Big Machine; Formats: CD, digital download, streaming |

=== EPs ===
| Title | Details |
|---|---|
| Real to Me | Released: February 12, 2021; Label: Big Machine; Formats: CD, digital download, streaming |

=== Singles ===
| Title | Year | Peak chart positions | | | Album |
| Title | Year | US Country Songs | US Country Airplay | CAN Country | Album |
|---|---|---|---|---|---|
| "It's 'Cause I Am" | 2021 | 30 | 20 | 43 | Real to Me: The Way I Feel |
| "Gave It Back Broken" | 2022 | — | — | — | Real to Me: The Way I Feel |
