= Dreamsicle (album) =

Studio album by Maren Morris
- Released: May 9, 2025
- Length: 43:27
- Label: Columbia
- Producers: Jack Antonoff; Evan Blair; Joel Little; Naomi McPherson; The Monsters & Strangerz; Maren Morris; Greg Kurstin; Jimmy Robbins; John Ryan

Maren Morris chronology
Intermission (2024)	Dreamsicle (2025)

Singles from Dreamsicle
- 1. "Carry Me Through" Released: March 27, 2025; 2. "Bed No Breakfast" Released: April 18, 2025

Singles from Dreamsicle (Deluxe)
- 1. "Be a Bitch" Released: July 25, 2025

Dreamsicle (stylized as D R E A M S I C L E) is the fourth studio album from American singer and songwriter Maren Morris. It was released on May 9, 2025, by Columbia Records. The album was preceded by the release of an extended play titled Intermission (2024) and spawned two singles: "Carry Me Through" and "Bed No Breakfast"; "Be a Bitch" was released as the single from the album's deluxe edition.

== Background and context ==
Dreamsicle marks Morris's first album in three years since the release of her previous studio album, Humble Quest (2022). During those years, Morris had to deal with some serious professional and personal life struggles. In 2022, Morris got in a highly public feud with fellow country singer Jason Aldean, and his wife Brittany, which began after Morris called out Brittany for using her social media platform to make transphobic remarks. Brittany then did an interview on Fox News with Tucker Carlson who labeled Morris as a "Lunatic Country Music Person" on national television for defending trans rights. At the same time, Morris become subject of intense media scrutiny from conservative country listeners and right-wing audience, who were against Morris' stance, some who previously had problems with her, after she called out country singer Morgan Wallen for using a racial slur in 2021. The scrutiny continued after Jason Aldean, who has shown support to his wife Brittany, continued the feud during a sold-out show where he incited his fans to boo Morris name. Morris received public support from fellow peers, including the Chicks, Laura Veltz, Brittney Spencer, Lady A, Jason Isbell, Brandi Carlile, and her then-husband Ryan Hurd, among others.

Following the increasing backlash, Morris released the fourth extended play, The Bridge, which contains the tracks "The Tree" and "Get the Hell Out of Here". She further released a statement where she announced that she was leaving the country music industry, citing the industry's unwillingness to reckon with issues of misogyny and racism, as well as its reluctance to support artists from marginalized demographics, as her reasons for doing so. She later clarified that she would still make country music, after tabloids spread misinformation omitting the word "Industry" from their headlines, causing more outrage against Morris. Critics had compared Morris controversial exit from the industry to the one faced by the Chicks. "Lemonade", "Carry Me Through", and "People Still Show Up" address Morris's feelings regarding the backlash.

In 2023, Morris filed from divorce from Ryan Hurd and officially separated in 2024. In 2024, she released her fifth extented play, titled Intermission, which includes five songs that were later included in Dreamsicle.

Speaking on the album's content with The Cut, Morris denied that the record was a divorce album stating that she's "not documenting what happened during the relationship" but instead she's "documenting the grief, anger, and sadness that follows, and the vulnerability of putting yourself back out there again … of reconnecting with your female friends and yourself", concluding "It's actually, to me, what happens after divorce". Morris also said about the process of the making of dreamsicle that "Ultimately, I just wanted to make music that heals whatever the fuck I went through".

"It represents a lot of influences, a lot of leaps of faith — just true artistic freedom, which is what I've always wanted, and I've had, but not in this way, where it's dovetailing with my personal life freedom, I've gotten to wear many hats in my career, but with my own personal project upcoming, there are no training wheels. I'm being my truest, most secure self. I think the album reflects [my experience of] becoming a mom in the last few years, changing the way I do business post-pandemic, and then also understanding why I needed to let go of some comforts to grow into the person that I needed to be."

— Morris, to Elle magazine about Dreamsicle

== Promotion ==
Music videos for "Lemonade", "Cry in the Car", "Dreamsicle", "Too Good", "Grand Bouquet", and "Holy Smoke" were released on May 9 alongside the release of the album, with the first four directed by Blythe Thomas.

"People Still Show Up" was released prior to Dreamsicle, on October 25, 2024. Morris announced the album's title, date, tracklist, and cover artwork on March 27, 2025. The pre-save was made available alongside the release of lead single "Carry Me Through". "Bed No Breakfast" was released as the album's third single on April 18. "Be a Bitch" was released on July 25, as overall fourth single for the deluxe edition of Dreamsicle.

=== Tour ===
Morris embarked into her Dreamsicle World Tour to support the album, with dates across North America, Europe, and the UK. The tour started in West Hollywood, US, on May 30.

== Critical reception ==
Professional ratings
Review scores
Source	Rating
AllMusic	4.5/5 stars
Country Universe	3.5/5 stars
Pitchfork	6.8/10
Rolling Stone	3.5/5 stars
Riff	8/10
Spectrum Culture	3.7/5 stars

Dreamsicle has received generally positive reviews, with music critics complimenting Morris' songwriting, vocal skills, and the album's cohesion. Matt Collar of AllMusic praised Morris artistry, vocal performance and her self-confidence, stating that with her new record "Morris has made an album that's less of a statement about walking away from Nashville and country music and more about the transcendent creative freedom that comes with knowing who you are." Writing for Rolling Stone, critic Maura Johnston described the record as "a complicated modern-pop confection", elaborating: "It has the surface trappings of a sun-dappled pop album, but those big hooks are often hiding semi-privately mourned wounds," indicating that while the music sounds upbeat, it subtly addresses more private, reflective feelings. Similarly, Piper Westrom of Riff called Dreamsicle "an authentic expression of pain, self-reclamation [...], and healing", describing the record as "well-executed" and a "showcase her fluidity as an artist". Alex Brodeur of The Vanderbilt Hustler praised Morris work as a songwriter, stating that Dreamsicle "is still a strong showing of Morris' successful songwriting and noteworthy musical hooks". Jon M. Gilbertson of The Shepherd Express commented positively about Morris' ability to jump between different music genres, calling her "a flexible singer" and saying she is "almost as savvy in her pop ways as Beyoncé and Taylor Swift are in theirs."

While less enthusiastic about its pop production, Jonathan Keefe of Country Universe highlighted Morris' unique songwriting and vocal performance on the album, saying, "she's doing some best-ever singing". Keefe also lamented the mistreatment Morris faced from part of the country industry, stating: "it's a damning indictment that the country genre would happily let someone who can write and sing like this just walk away while they continue to talk about being one big family".

== Track listing ==
Standard edition
No.	Title	Writer(s)	Producer(s)	Length
1.	"Lemonade"	Maren Morris; Jordan K. Johnson; Stefan Johnson; Michael Pollack; Ali Tamposi; Isaiah Tejada	Tejada; The Monsters & Strangerz; S. Johnson^{[v]}	2:58
2.	"People Still Show Up"	Morris; Jack Antonoff; Laura Veltz	Antonoff	2:52
3.	"Cry in the Car"	Morris; Tobias Jesso Jr.; Josette Maskin; Naomi McPherson	McPherson; Jimmy Robbins^{[v]}	2:47
4.	"Cut!" (featuring Julia Michaels)	Morris; Caroline Ailin; Joel Little; Julia Michaels	Little	2:08
5.	"Bed No Breakfast"	Morris; Delacey; J. Johnson; S. Johnson; John Ryan	Ryan; The Monsters & Strangerz; S. Johnson^{[v]}	2:26
6.	"Dreamsicle"	Morris	Robbins; Morris	2:58
7.	"I Hope I Never Fall in Love"	Morris; Evan Blair; Delacey; Lucy Healey	Blair	3:36
8.	"Too Good"	Morris; Jesso; Little	Little	2:40
9.	"Push Me Over"	Morris; Catherine Gavin; Jesso; Maskin; McPherson	McPherson; Robbins^{[v]}	3:36
10.	"Because, of Course"	Morris; Mike Elizondo; Pollack; Veltz	Blair	2:47
11.	"Grand Bouquet"	Morris; Antonoff; Veltz	Antonoff	3:46
12.	"This Is How a Woman Leaves"	Morris; Sarah Buxton; Madi Diaz	Blair	2:49
13.	"Carry Me Through"	Morris; Greg Kurstin	Kurstin	3:35
14.	"Holy Smoke"	Morris; Antonoff; Veltz	Antonoff	4:37
Total length:				43:27

Extended edition
No.	Title	Writer(s)	Producer(s)	Length
15.	"Cut!" (Solo Version)	Morris; Ailin; Little	Little	2:08
Total length:				45:35

Deluxe edition
No.	Title	Writer(s)	Producer(s)	Length
15.	"In Love with Me"	Morris; Veltz; Robbins	Morris; Robbins	2:41
16.	"Be a Bitch"	Morris; Veltz; Robbins	Morris; Robbins	3:04
17.	"Running"	Morris; Jesso Jr.; McPherson; Maskin; Catherine Hope Gavin	McPherson; Laura Sisk	3:50
18.	"Earth Angel"	Morris; Veltz; Robbins	Morris; Robbins	2:55
Total length:				55:57

=== Notes ===
- ^{^[v]} signifies a vocal producer.
- All track titles are stylized in all lowercase.

== Personnel ==
Credits are adapted from Tidal.

=== Musicians ===
- Maren Morris – lead vocals (all tracks), background vocals (tracks 1–5, 8, 10, 14), synthesizer (6), percussion (11, 14)
- Jordan K. Johnson – drums, keyboards, programming (tracks 1, 5)
- Stefan Johnson – drums, keyboards, programming (tracks 1, 5)
- Isaiah Tejada – bass, drums, organ, piano, programming (track 1)
- Ali Tamposi – background vocals (track 1)
- Michael Pollack – background vocals (track 1)
- Alex Strahel – guitar (track 1)
- Jack Antonoff – bass, drums, Mellotron, synthesizer (tracks 2, 11, 14); cello, organ, programming (2); guitar, piano, slide guitar (11, 14), acoustic guitar (14)
- Laura Veltz – background vocals (track 2)
- Naomi McPherson – guitar, programming (tracks 3, 9); drums, synth bass, synthesizer (3); keyboards (9)
- Geo Botelho – bass (tracks 3, 9)
- Joel Little – programming (tracks 4, 8); keyboards, percussion, synthesizer (4); acoustic guitar, bass, drums, strings (8)
- Julia Michaels – lead vocals, background vocals (track 4)
- John Ryan – drums, programming (track 5)
- Rob Moose – strings (tracks 6, 8, 12); viola, violin (8)
- Jimmy Robbins – acoustic guitar, guitar, keyboards, synthesizer (track 6)
- Evan Blair – bass, guitar (tracks 7, 10, 12)
- Steve Wolf – drums (tracks 7, 10, 12)
- Delacey – background vocals (track 7)
- Katie Gavin – background vocals (track 9)
- Josette Maskin – guitar (track 9)
- Madi Diaz – background vocals (track 12)
- Greg Kurstin – bass, drums, guitar, keyboards, Mellotron, organ, percussion, piano, strings, synthesizer (track 13)

=== Technical ===
- Dale Becker – mastering (tracks 1, 3–14)
- Ruairi O'Flaherty – mastering (track 2)
- Alex Ghenea – mixing (tracks 1, 4, 5, 7–10, 12)
- Laura Sisk – mixing (tracks 2, 3, 6, 11, 14), engineering (2, 11, 14)
- Greg Kurstin – mixing, engineering (track 13)
- Stefan Johnson – engineering (tracks 1, 5)
- Oli Jacobs – engineering (tracks 2, 11, 14)
- Joel Little – engineering (tracks 4, 8)
- Denis Kosiak – engineering (track 4)
- Rob Moose – engineering (track 8)
- Jimmy Robbins – engineering (track 9), vocal engineering (3), editing (6)
- Jack Manning – engineering (track 11), engineering assistance (2, 10)
- Jack Antonoff – engineering (track 11)
- Julian Burg – engineering (track 13)
- Matt Tuggle – engineering (track 13)
- Evan Blair – vocal engineering (tracks 7, 10, 12)
- Adam Burt – engineering assistance (tracks 1, 3–6, 10, 13, 14), mastering assistance (9, 12)
- Brady Wortzel – engineering assistance (tracks 1, 3, 4)
- Noah McCorkle – engineering assistance (tracks 1, 3–6, 10, 13, 14), mastering assistance (9, 12)
- Dani Perez – engineering assistance (tracks 2, 10)
- Joey Miller – engineering assistance (tracks 2, 10)
- Jozef Caldwell – engineering assistance (track 2), mixing assistance (14)
- Geo Botelho – engineering assistance (track 9)
- Naomi McPherson – engineering assistance (track 9)
- Brandon Hernandez – mastering assistance (tracks 9, 12)

== Charts ==
Weekly chart performance
Chart (2025)	Peak position
Scottish Albums (Official Charts)	18
UK Albums Sales (OCC)	26
US Top Album Sales (Billboard)	28

== Release history ==
Release history
Region	Date	Format(s)	Label	Ref.
Various	May 9, 2025	CD; digital download; streaming; vinyl LP	Columbia	
