= Scissors (song) =

Single by Julia Michaels and Maren Morris

from the EP Second Self
- Released: January 10, 2025
- Length: 2:26
- Label: GFY
- Songwriters: John Ryan; Jordan Johnson; Julia Michaels; Stef Johnson
- Producers: John Ryan; The Monsters & Strangerz

Julia Michaels singles chronology
"Heaven II" (2024)	"Scissors" (2025)	"GFY" (2025)

Maren Morris singles chronology
"People Still Show Up" (2024)	"Scissors" (2025)	"Carry Me Through" (2025)

Music video
- "Scissors" on YouTube

"Scissors" is a song by American singers Julia Michaels and Maren Morris. It was released on January 10, 2025, as the second single of Michaels's sixth extended play (EP), Second Self (2025). The song marked Michaels's third collaboration with Morris, following "Cut!" (2024). Lyrically, it approaches the end of a relationship with humor and emotional detachment rather than heartbreak, while its accompanying music video depicts the pair taking revenge on an unfaithful partner.

== Background and composition ==
Announcing "Scissors" on Instagram, Michaels praised Morris, writing that she was "in awe" of her "voice", "talent", and "the woman [she is]", adding that it was "an honor" to sing with her again. She also expressed pride in the accompanying music video, saying she hoped it captured "the magic and beauty" of the Altadena foothills.

"Scissors" was written by John Ryan, Jordan Johnson, Stefan Johnson, and Michaels. Production was handled by Ryan and the Monsters & Strangerz. Michaels and Morris perform the lead vocals, while Ryan also contributed background vocals, bass guitar, drums, guitar, percussion, programming, synthesizer, and recording engineering. Additional recording engineering was provided by Jeff Gunnell and the Monsters & Strangerz. The song was mixed by Matt Huber.

Lyrically, "Scissors" presents an indifferent perspective on the end of a relationship. Michaels described the song as "a funny way of saying that I'm unbothered", adding that it reflects having "thick" skin and not being "pressed" when someone chooses to leave. Morris also said the song embraces "apathy and a lightheartedness" rather than heartbreak, arguing that "not everything ends in heartbreak" and that such perspectives are underrepresented in "breakup songs".

== Release and promotion ==
Following their collaboration on "Cut!" (2024), "Scissors" was released on January 10, 2025, along with the accompanying music video, as the third collaboration between Michaels and Morris. They performed the song on March 7, at The Tonight Show Starring Jimmy Fallon.

== Music video ==
Directed by Blythe Thomas, the accompanying music video was filmed at a house in Altadena, California. Shortly after production concluded, the home was destroyed in the Eaton Fire. Michaels later revealed the loss in a pinned YouTube comment, expressing sadness for the family who had lent their house for the shoot and sharing a GoFundMe campaign to support their recovery.

The video opens with Michaels sitting on the floor holding an oversized pair of scissors before surprising her partner with a new red car. As the video progresses, she is shown performing domestic tasks while Morris appears separately inside a house surrounded by black cats. After discovering that Michaels's partner has been unfaithful, the pair plot revenge together, ultimately cutting the brakes on his new car and leaving him injured. Throughout the video, recurring imagery of scissors and the color red reflects the song's motif of severing a relationship.

== Personnel ==
Credits were adapted from Tidal.

- Julia Michaels – lead vocals, songwriter
- Maren Morris – lead vocals
- John Ryan – producer, songwriter, background vocals, bass guitar, drums, guitar, percussion, programming, recording engineer, synthesizer
- The Monsters & Strangerz – producer, percussion, programming, recording engineer, synthesizer
- Jordan Johnson – songwriter
- Stefan Johnson – songwriter
- Matt Huber – mixing engineer
- Jeff Gunnell – recording engineer

== Charts ==
Weekly chart performance
Chart (2024)	Peak position
New Zealand Hot Singles (RMNZ)	39
