= Welcome to the End =

Single by Maren Morris
- Released: July 11, 2025
- Length: 2:15
- Label: All Things Go; Maren Morris
- Songwriters: Jimmy Robbins; Julia Michaels; Maren Morris
- Producer: Jack Antonoff

Maren Morris singles chronology
"Bed No Breakfast" (2025)	"Welcome to the End" (2025)	"Be a Bitch" (2025)

Audio video
- "Welcome to the End" on YouTube

"Welcome to the End" is a song by American singer and songwriter Maren Morris. It was released on July 11, 2025, through All Things Go Records and her own imprint of the same name. She co-wrote the song with Jimmy Robbins and Julia Michaels. Produced by Jack Antonoff, the song appears on a charity compilation album benefiting The Ally Coalition. A psychedelic-tinged track, "Welcome to the End" explores the emotional sacrifices involved in pursuing one's ambitions while emphasizing resilience in the face of adversity.

== Background and release ==
Following Joy Oladokun and Allison Ponthier's single "Jesus and John Wayne", "Welcome to the End" was released as the second track from a charity compilation album benefiting Jack Antonoff's nonprofit organization, The Ally Coalition, which supports LGBTQ+ youth through tours, campaigns, and partnerships. Morris described the song as being "about the mental sacrifices you'll make to achieve your dream" and added that although "it's not a straight or pretty path to get there", resilience can be unexpected. She also said she was pleased that the song's release would support the Ally Coalition and Antonoff's initiative to integrate recording studios into LGBTQ+ youth shelters.

== Composition ==
Produced by Antonoff, "Welcome to the End" is a two-minute song incorporating elements of psychedelia. Its lyrics explore the emotional cost of pursuing one's ambitions, with the refrain, "Oh, have you forgotten? / This is what you wanted", serving as a reminder of the sacrifices made in chasing a dream.

== Personnel ==
Credits were adapted from Tidal.

- Maren Morris – lead vocal, songwriter
- Jack Antonoff – producer
- Jimmy Robbins – songwriter
- Julia Michaels – songwriter
