= Highway Queen (song) =

Single by Mt. Joy featuring Maren Morris

from the album Hope We Have Fun
- Released: September 13, 2024
- Length: 3:31
- Label: Bloom Field
- Songwriter: Matt Quinn
- Producers: Matt Quinn; Jonathan Gilbert

Mt. Joy singles chronology
| "Evergreen" (2022) | "Highway Queen" (2024) | "She Wants to Go Dancing" (2024) |

Maren Morris singles chronology
| "Kiss the Sky" (2024) | "Highway Queen" (2024) | "People Still Show Up" (2025) |

"Highway Queen" is a song by American band Mt. Joy featuring American singer and songwriter Maren Morris. It was released on September 15, 2024, as the lead single of Mt. Joy's fourth studio album, Hope We Have Fun (2025). Matt Quinn wrote the song, co-producing it with Jonathan Gilbert.

== Background and release ==
Originally released in March 2024, "Highway Queen" was reissued on September 13, featuring guest vocals from Morris after the collaboration had been teased on social media earlier that month. Mt. Joy frontman Matt Quinn praised Morris's contribution, describing her voice as "incredible" and saying her harmonies "brought that song to life like never before", adding that working with her was "really special" for the band.

== Composition and inspiration ==
Quinn wrote "Highway Queen" and co-produced it with Jonathan Gilbert. Quinn performs the lead vocals, while Morris contributes featured vocals. "Highway Queen" explores loving someone who shares the same restless nature. Quinn said the song was inspired by his life on the road with his wife and the feeling that constant movement can become both a refuge and a burden. Morris related the song to her own experiences as a touring musician, saying it reflects "lament[ing] to a lover about keeping up with [her], literally and figuratively speaking". She added that although she values her independence, she hopes to one day find "that person who can bend with [her]".

== Personnel ==
Credits were adapted from Tidal.

- Matt Quinn – lead vocals, songwriter, producer
- Maren Morris – featured vocals
- Jonathan Gilbert – producer

== Charts ==
Weekly chart performance
| Chart (2024) | Peak position |
|---|---|
| US Adult Alternative Airplay (Billboard) | 2 |
