= Kiss the Sky (Maren Morris song) =

Single by Maren Morris

from the album The Wild Robot (Original Motion Picture Soundtrack)
- Released: August 28, 2024
- Genre: Pop
- Length: 3:35
- Label: Back Lot Music
- Songwriters: Maren Morris; Ali Tamposi; Jordan Johnson; Michael Pollack; Stefan Johnson; Delacey
- Producers: The Monsters & Strangerz; Isaiah Tejada

Maren Morris singles chronology
"I Hope I Never Fall in Love" (2024)	"Kiss the Sky" (2024)	"Highway Queen" (2024)

Music video
- "Kiss the Sky (from The Wild Robot)" on YouTube

"Kiss the Sky" is a song by American singer Maren Morris from the soundtrack to the 2024 animated film The Wild Robot. It was released as the soundtrack's lead single on August 28, 2024 by Back Lot Music. "Kiss the Sky" was written by Morris, Ali Tamposi, Jordan Johnson, Michael Pollack, Stefan Johnson, and Delacey, and it was produced by The Monsters & Strangerz and Isaiah Tejada. It was met with widespread positive reviews with many music critics praising its inclusion in the film.

== Background and composition ==
According to Tom Breihan of Stereogum the song plays during "a scene of migrating geese." Morris explained to Billboard and Deadline that her own experiences as a mother made her connect with the story and helped her in the making of the songs.

“I was so emotionally moved by this story as a mother. Writing the songs for this film was such an honor because it made me feel even closer to my son, especially when I’m touring and sometimes have to be far away from him.”

— Maren Morris talking about her approach into making her songs for The Wild Robot to Billboard.

== Release and promotion ==
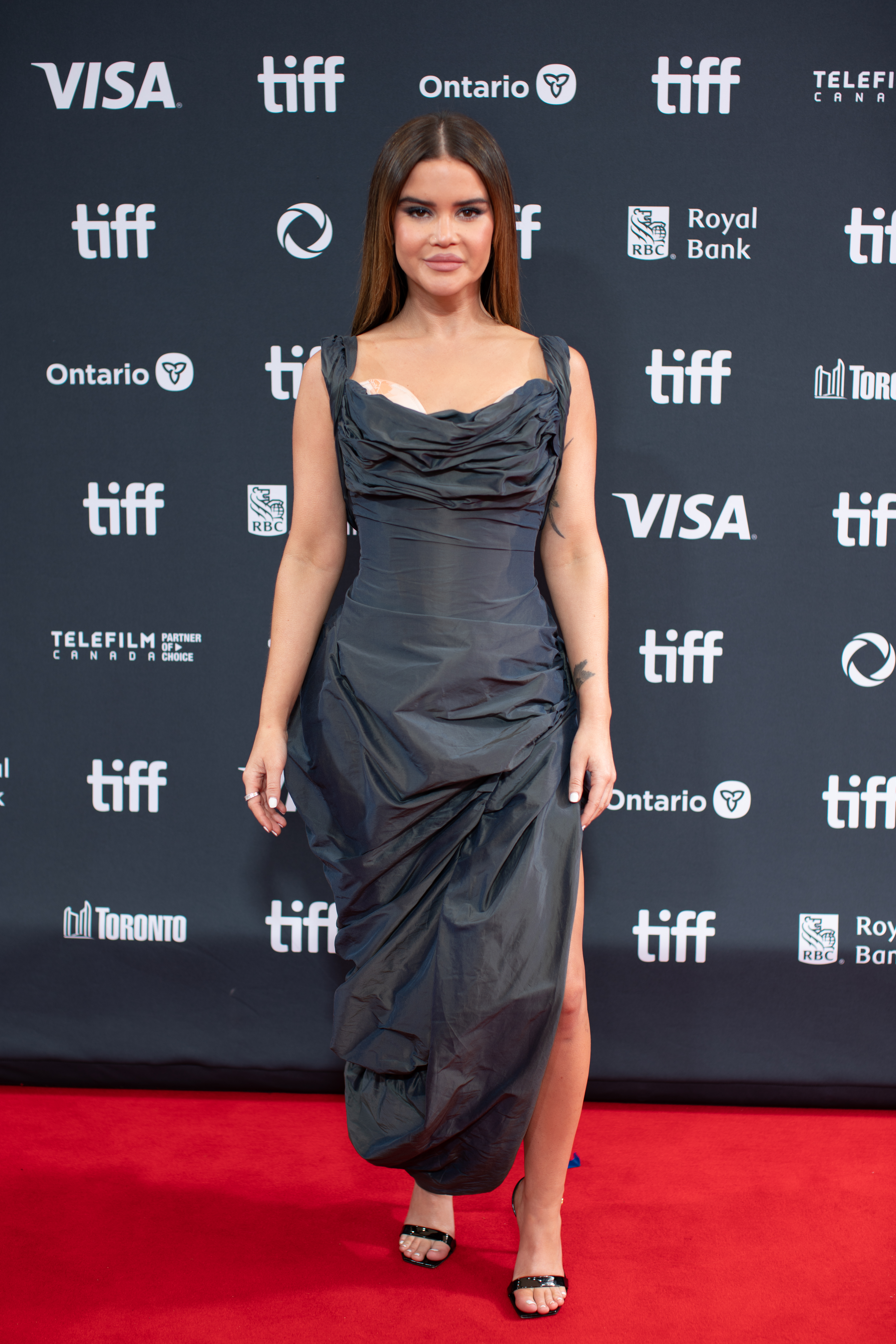
Maren Morris on the screening of The Wild Robot at the 2024 Toronto International Film Festival.

The song was used in the trailer for The Wild Robot, and was officially released as a single on August 28. Morris was invited to the film premiere at TIFF alongside the voice cast members of the film, where she talked about her involvement in the movie soundtrack, including her two original songs made for the film, "Kiss the Sky" and "Even When I'm Not". Both tracks were included on The Wild Robot soundtrack album curated by Kris Bowers, which was released on September 27, 2024.

== Critical reception ==
Peter Travers of ABC News recommended the track to his readers, stating that "Kiss the Sky," is "a heart-song for the ages." Tom Breihan of Stereogum also praised the track, dubbing it as "perfectly pleasant", as well noticing some "Mumford-style stadium-folk" influences. He went further reviewing why the song works in the movie saying: "In isolation, it’s just fine, but I can imagine it hitting pretty hard in the context of the movie."

On December 9, "Kiss the Sky" was nominated in the category Best Original Song at the 2024 Golden Globes Awards, marking Morris's first-ever nomination. The song was shortlisted for Best Original Song at the 97th Academy Awards, though it was ultimately not nominated.

== Accolades ==
List of awards and nominations received by "Kiss the Sky"
Year	Award	Category	Result	Ref.
2024	Astra Film Awards	Best Original Song	Nominated	
2024	Hollywood Music in Media Awards	Best Original Song – Animated Film	Won	
2024	Iowa Film Critics Association Awards	Best Original Song	Won	
2024	New Mexico Film Critics Awards	Best Original Song	Won	
2024	Las Vegas Film Critics Society Awards	Best Song	Nominated	
2025	Critics' Choice Movie Awards	Best Song	Nominated	
2025	Golden Globe Awards	Best Original Song	Nominated	
2025	Music City Film Critics Association Awards	Best Original Song	Won	
2025	North Carolina Film Critics Association Awards	Best Original Song	Nominated	
2025	Denver Film Critics Society Awards	Best Original Song	Nominated	
2025	Puerto Rico Critics Association Awards	Best Original Song	Won	
2025	Guild Of Music Supervisors Awards	Best Song Written and/or Recorded for a Film	Nominated	
2025	Satellite Awards	Best Original Song	Nominated	
2025	Academy Awards	Best Original Song	Shortlisted	
2025	Kids' Choice Awards	Favorite Song from a Movie	Nominated	

== Release history ==
Release dates and formats for "Kiss the Sky"
Region	Date	Format	Label	Ref.
Various	August 28, 2024	Digital download; streaming	Back Lot Music; Warner	
Various	September 27, 2024	LP; Digital download; streaming	Back Lot Music; Warner	
