= Bed No Breakfast =

Single by Maren Morris

from the album Dreamsicle
- Released: April 18, 2025
- Length: 2:26
- Label: Columbia
- Songwriters: Delacey; John Ryan; Jordan K. Johnson; Maren Morris; Stefan Johnson
- Producers: John Ryan; The Monsters & Strangerz

Maren Morris singles chronology
"Carry Me Through" (2025)	"Bed No Breakfast" (2025)	"Welcome to the End" (2025)

Music video
- "Bed No Breakfast" on YouTube

"Bed No Breakfast" is a song by American singer and songwriter Maren Morris. It was released on April 18, 2025, through Columbia Records, as the second single from her fourth studio album, Dreamsicle (2025). Written as the final song completed for the album, "Bed No Breakfast" was inspired by Morris's experiences navigating dating after her divorce. A tongue-in-cheek anthem about casual relationships and personal space, the song was released as a stylistic contrast to the album's lead single, "Carry Me Through", highlighting the record's humor alongside its more introspective moments.

== Background and writing ==
This was the last song I wrote for Dreamsicle and I was honestly just divulging to Delacey during our writing session how dating for me had been going. turns out we laughed our way into writing an avoidant (but sexy) anthem about personal space after... personal closeness. If you enjoy secret doomscrolling at 3am, lying diagonally with no one next you to bother and sleeping to in, I hope this song becomes your personal mantra.

— Morris, via The Lunatic

Morris described "Bed No Breakfast" as her "cheeky little song about wanting personal space after... personal closeness". She said the song is about "a right to your own comforts on your own terms" while still "having some good-natured fun with somebody", adding that "drunk girls don't cry... they kick you out." To contrast the emotional tone of "Carry Me Through", she chose "Bed No Breakfast" as the second preview of her fourth studio album, Dreamsicle. While describing the former as an intentionally "soulful" opening centered on healing and self-reliance, she said "Bed No Breakfast" showcases the album's "tongue-in-cheek humor and realism" as well as "some Texan sass". Morris also noted that although the song reflects her reentering the dating scene, dating was "not priority one", explaining that her focus remained on her work, herself, and her son.

== Composition ==
Written by Morris and Delacey as the final song completed for Dreamsicle, "Bed No Breakfast" was inspired by a joke Morris made about her dating life. Produced by John Ryan and the Monsters & Strangerz, the song centers on casual romantic encounters and the narrator's preference for ending them before the following morning.

== Music video ==
The accompanying music video was released on the same day of the song's release. The video depicts Morris lounging on a bed, preparing bacon and toast with an iron, and hanging laundry outdoors. It also features a reference to the social film platform Letterboxd, where Morris gives her Live from New York (2022) concert special a five-star rating, echoing the song's lyrics about receiving a "five star review".

== Personnel ==
Credits were adapted from Tidal.

- Maren Morris – vocals, background vocals, songwriter
- John Ryan – producer, songwriter, drums, programming
- The Monsters & Strangerz – producer
- Jordan K. Johnson – songwriter, drums, keyboards, programming
- Stefan Johnson – songwriter, drums, keyboards, programming, recording engineer, vocal producer
- Delacey – songwriter
- Alex Ghenea – mixing
- Dale Becker – mastering
- Adam Burt – assistant engineer
- Noah McCorkle – assistant engineer
- Christian "C" Johnson – coordinator
- David "Dsilb" Silberstein – coordinator
- Jeremy "Jboogs" Levin – coordinator
