= People Still Show Up =

Single by Maren Morris
- Written: 2023
- Released: October 25, 2024
- Genre: Alternative pop
- Length: 2:52
- Label: Columbia
- Songwriters: Maren Morris; Laura Veltz; Jack Antonoff
- Producer: Jack Antonoff

Maren Morris singles chronology
"Highway Queen" (2024)	"People Still Show Up" (2024)	"Scissors" (2025)

Lyric video
- "People Still Show Up" on YouTube

"People Still Show Up" (stylized in all lowercase) is a song by American singer-songwriter Maren Morris. It was released on October 25, 2024, through Columbia Records, and is included in her fourth studio album, Dreamsicle. Morris wrote the song with Laura Veltz and Jack Antonoff, while Antonoff produced it.

== Promotion and release ==
Morris announced "People Still Show Up" on October 22, 2024. The song, included in her fourth studio album, Dreamsicle, was released three days later. The date of release received media coverage after Morris's ex-husband Ryan Hurd was also dropping his comeback single that day. An accompanying lyric video was released along with the song's release.

== Composition ==
"I had no idea after writing this song at the beginning of 2023 how much deeper of a change my life was going to take, and I'm shook that it resonates with me today even more than it did then. from needing a martini and therapy session with my best friend at our favorite new haunt, to a trauma dump writing session turned manic giggle fest, to the hometown energy of every Lunatic show... my friends, family, cowriters, and fans still showed up. if it's 2000 people or just 1, you only need one hand to help you out. also, to be frank, with everything going on right now, l just wanted to put out something vibey and fun."

— Morris, on the process behind "People Still Show Up"

Co-written with Jack Antonoff and Laura Veltz in early 2023, "People Show Up" marks Morris and Antonoff's second collaboration, following the 2023 track "Get the Hell Out of Here". "People Still Show Up" is an alternative pop song, talking about people's reactions from the aftermath of her controversial and highly covered exit from the country music industry.

== Reception ==
Emily Zemler of Rolling Stone dubbed the track as a "celebration of positivity." Stereoboard's Jon Stickler praised its production and Morris's vocal performance, describing it as a "minimal, slow-build alternative-pop" that showcases "Morris' vocals weaving in and out of drum and bass-driven production".

== Release history ==
Release dates and formats
Region	Date	Format(s)	Label	Ref.
Various	October 25, 2024	Digital download; streaming	Columbia	
