= The Wild Robot (soundtrack) =

2024 soundtrack album

The Wild Robot (Original Motion Picture Soundtrack)

Film score by Kris Bowers
- Released: September 27, 2024
- Recorded: 2024
- Studios: AIR Studios, London
- Genre: Film score
- Label: Back Lot Music
- Producer: Kris Bowers

Kris Bowers chronology
Bob Marley: One Love (2024)	The Wild Robot (Original Motion Picture Soundtrack) (2024)	The Eyes of Ghana (2025)

Singles from The Wild Robot
- 1. "Kiss the Sky" Released: August 28, 2024

The Wild Robot (Original Motion Picture Soundtrack) is the soundtrack album for the 2024 film of the same name. It features the original score composed by Kris Bowers, his first for a fully animated film. It also includes two original songs, "Kiss the Sky" and "Even When I'm Not", co-written and performed by Maren Morris. The album was released on September 27, 2024, by Back Lot Music.

== Background ==
In March 2024, Kris Bowers was revealed to be composing the score for The Wild Robot, marking his first score for a fully animated film. Writer and director Chris Sanders desired for the film to heavily rely on music and told Bowers as such when he was first hired. Bowers started work on the score shortly after the birth of his daughter and spent two years refining it. He wrote over 80 minutes of music for the film.

The main theme was the first piece the composer wrote for the film. He wanted it to embody the film's theme of family, how it is represented by the island setting, and the relationship of Roz and Brightbill. Another piece that Bowers started writing early in the production was the music of the geese migration scene in which Roz and Brightbill are separated. He aimed for it to feel grand and stated he felt proud of his initial piece. Sanders was indifferent to it though and asked Bowers to imagine dropping his daughter off at college and capturing those feelings into the music. After further collaboration, Bowers realized that at that point in the film's story, Roz and Brightbill's relationship was fractured and that the scene's music should play into that. The relationship of the two characters resonated with Bowers and made him reflect on the one he has with his daughter. Emotionally charged by this, he wrote a new piece and presented it to Sanders. The director was moved and reacted more positively.

Bowers avoided using instruments associated with specific cultures. In creating the sound of the wilderness, Bowers brought in an ensemble group, the Sandbox Percussion, four men that played percussive sets. The group's sets included chromatically tuned glass bottles, teacups, planks of wood, and cowbells. Synth sounds became the base of Roz's musically identity. Fink's theme featured the Sandbox Percussion's instruments and Bowers wanted it to embody the characters sly personality. He described his approach as a "sly, jazzy, bluesy vibe with a fun groove". Over the course of the film, Fink's theme becomes more welcoming and tender, to reflect his character growth. At the film's end, Roz, now close friends with the islands local wilderness, makes the decision to return to her factory to keep the island and her companions safe. This conclusion resonated with Bowers and when writing a piece for it, he thought of the sacrifices others in life had made for him. The score was released as part of the soundtrack album by Back Lot Music on September 27, 2024, the same day as the film's United States release.

== Original songs ==
Two original songs were announced to be made for the film performed by Maren Morris and written by Morris, Ali Tamposi, Michael Pollack, Delacey, Jordan Johnson and Stefan Johnson: "Kiss the Sky" and "Even When I'm Not", with the former being released on August 28, 2024, while the latter, along with the full soundtrack album, was released on September 27. Morris and her team of co-writers were inspired to write a second song for the film, "Even When I'm Not", which is featured in the film's end credits, when they screened the finished film.

== Reception ==
Steve Seigh of Joblo.com praised the score, referring to it as "a brilliant accompaniment, saturating the audience in symphonic soundscapes oscillating between rollicking, wondrous, and melancholy." Kevin Lee of AwardsWatch called the score one of 2024's most memorable and compared it to Howard Shore and Hans Zimmer's work. Shaina Weatherhead of Collider commended the score and how it was put in the use in the film and referred to it as a character in its own right. She also levied praise towards the original songs for their emotional weight.

Tim Grierson of Screen International similarly commended the score for its function in the story, saying that it punctuated "the well-earned emotional crescendos." As did Brian Talleric of RogerEbert.com, who referred to the music as "propulsive". Gregory Ellwood of The Playlist said that the original songs gave the film a "heartwarming kick".

== Track listing ==
All music is composed by Kris Bowers, except as noted.

The Wild Robot (Original Motion Picture Soundtrack) track listing
No.	Title	Writer(s)	Artist(s)	Length
1.	"Kiss the Sky"	Morris; Ali Tamposi; Jordan Johnson; Michael Pollack; Stefan Johnson; Delacey	Maren Morris	3:36
2.	"Even When I'm Not"	Tamposi; Isaiah Tejada; J. Johnson; S. Johnson; Pollack; Bowers	Maren Morris	3:05
3.	"The Island"			1:20
4.	"Activating Learning Mode"			0:48
5.	"Deploying Rescue Transmitter"			0:48
6.	"System Breach"		Bowers; Sandbox Percussion	2:37
7.	"The Accident"			1:12
8.	"The Egg and the Fox"		Bowers; Sandbox Percussion	2:04
9.	"Hatching"			1:04
10.	"Brightbill"			1:02
11.	"Pinktail"			0:32
12.	"You're His Mother Now"			1:42
13.	"Eat, Swim, Fly"			0:56
14.	"Fink"		Bowers; Sandbox Percussion	1:45
15.	"Roz Builds a Home"			2:37
16.	"Choosing a Name"			1:21
17.	"Bedtime Story"			2:41
18.	"Activating Interspecies Outreach Protocol"			1:06
19.	"Swimming Tests"			1:04
20.	"Kind of Normal"			1:16
21.	"Rockmouth"			1:17
22.	"That Thing"			1:05
23.	"The Confession"			1:46
24.	"In the Wrong Place"			1:51
25.	"Universal Dynamics"			1:07
26.	"Non-Negotiable"			0:35
27.	"I Could Use a Boost"			3:07
28.	"Task Complete"			1:51
29.	"The Migration"			1:12
30.	"Unauthorized Lifeforms"			2:43
31.	"Good to See a Friend"			0:49
32.	"Rescue Mission"			2:29
33.	"Truce"			2:27
34.	"Return"			1:51
35.	"Vontra"			2:36
36.	"Robots vs. The Wild"			6:11
37.	"Back Online"			2:14
38.	"I Have Everything I Need"			1:29
39.	"You Don't Have To"			3:05
40.	"Roz's Story"			2:03
41.	"Roz's Startup Music"			0:52
