= Carry Me Through =

Single by Maren Morris

from the album Dreamsicle
- Written: Early 2023
- Released: March 27, 2025
- Length: 3:36
- Label: Columbia
- Songwriters: Greg Kurstin; Maren Morris
- Producer: Greg Kurstin

Maren Morris singles chronology
"Scissors" (2025)	"Carry Me Through" (2025)	"Bed No Breakfast" (2025)

Music video
- "Carry Me Through" on YouTube

"Carry Me Through" is a song by American singer and songwriter Maren Morris. It was released on March 27, 2025, through Columbia Records, as the lead single from her fourth studio album, Dreamsicle (2025). Morris wrote it with Greg Kurstin, who produced the song.

Written during what Morris described as "a deep pit-of-isolation moment", "Carry Me Through" was inspired by anxieties surrounding touring, motherhood, and uncertainty about her life and career. Built around piano-driven instrumentation with elements of soul and gospel, it explores themes of healing and self-reliance, emphasizing that personal growth ultimately depends on one's own decision to move forward.

== Background and writing ==
According to Morris, "Carry Me Through" was written in early 2023, before "a lot of shit went down" and during "a deep pit-of-isolation moment". Coming to view the song as a "premonition", she explained that it addressed anxieties she had been experiencing while reminding herself that "it's not all on you right now" and to "lean on safe people", including those surrounding touring, motherhood, post-pandemic life, and uncertainty about her career. While acknowledging the support of her therapist, family, and friends, Morris said the song ultimately reflects the belief that personal growth depends on one's own decision to "break" old patterns and "carry yourself across the line".

== Composition ==
Greg Kurstin produced "Carry Me Through" and co-wrote it with Morris. In addition to handling mixing, he played bass, drums, guitar, keyboards, Wurlitzer, Mellotron, organ, percussion, piano, strings, and synthesizer, and served as a recording engineer alongside Julian Burg and Matt Tuggle. Morris performs the lead vocals. The song was mastered by Dale Becker at his studio Becker Mastering (Pasadena, California), with Adam Burt and Noah McCorkle serving as assistant engineers.

"Carry Me Through" is a soul and gospel-infused piano ballad. The song ultimately emphasizes personal responsibility although acknowledging the support of friends and loved ones, culminating in the affirmation that she alone must "choose / To carry me through." Stereogum's Danielle Chelosky critics described the song as "reflective ballad".

== Promotion and release ==
In the days leading up to the announcement, Morris began previewing the project by clearing her Instagram account and posting a series of promotional images and videos, including two black-and-white clips featuring her performing ballet-inspired movements to an instrumental piano song. On March 25, 2025, Morris confirmed the lead single "Carry Me Through", announcing a cover art and release date of her then-upcoming fourth studio album, Dreamsicle. The song was released on March 27, 2025, through Columbia Records.

== Critical reception ==
Reviewing Dreamsicle, Maura Johnston of Rolling Stone described "Carry Me Through" as a reflection on hardship and resilience. He wrote that Morris's opening lyric, "Feels like the worst year / is always the one you're in", conveys "hard-won wisdom", interpreting the song as a reminder that life's difficulties often appear less overwhelming in retrospect and calling it "appropriate observation on Dreamsicle".

== Personnel ==
Credits were adapted from Tidal.

- Maren Morris – vocals, songwriter
- Greg Kurstin – producer, songwriter, bass, drums, guitar, keyboards, Mellotron, mixing, organ, percussion, piano, recording engineer, strings, synthesizer
- Julian Burg – recording engineer
- Matt Tuggle – recording engineer
- Dale Becker – mastering
- Adam Burt – assistant engineer
- Noah McCorkle – assistant engineer
