= Second Self (EP) =

EP by Julia Michaels
- Released: May 23, 2025
- Length: 16:47
- Label: GFY; Stem
- Producer: Pete Nappi; Tenroc; Carlo Colasacco; Jon Bellion; John Ryan; The Monsters & Strangerz; Mattman & Robin; Ojivolta; Emmit Fenn

Julia Michaels chronology
Not in Chronological Order (2021)	Second Self (2025)

Singles from Second Self
- 1. "Heaven II" Released: November 8, 2024; 2. "Scissors" Released: January 10, 2025; 3. "GFY" Released: March 7, 2025; 4. "Try Your Luck" Released: May 23, 2025

Second Self is the sixth extended play by American singer and songwriter Julia Michaels. It was released through GFY Records under exclusive distribution licensing to Stem Distribution on May 23, 2025. It follows her 2021 debut album Not in Chronological Order, and it marks her first full-length release as an independent artist. The EP features six songs, including a collaboration with country pop singer-songwriter Maren Morris.

== Background and release ==
After almost a decade as an artist signed under Republic Records, Michaels officially left the label in 2023, to form her own GFY Records through a distribution partnership with Stem. Her first release on her own record label was "Heaven II" in 2024, which was set to be part of an upcoming project. In early May 2025, Michaels announced the release of her upcoming sixth extended play titled, Second Self, featuring "Heaven II", her two next releases "Scissors" and "GFY", alongside three new songs on May 23. For the visuals of the project Michaels worked with Blythe Thomas. In an interview with Rolling Stone, Michaels said about the content of the EP:

"These songs are raw, unfiltered, and some are way too specific. Some are fun and lighthearted and some are a bit more in your face, I’ve loved these songs for months, years and [they] have held such a special place in my heart. I’m excited to be able to share them with my fans. It’s [songs] they can dance to or scream at an ex to."

— Julia Michaels, to Rolling Stone

== Promotion ==
To promote the EP, four songs have been released as singles: "Heaven II" was released as the extended play lead single on November 8, 2024. it marked Michaels's first release as an independent artist. "Scissors", a collaboration with singer Maren Morris served as the EP second single. It was released alongside its music video on January 10, 2025. "GFY" was released on March 7 as the third single, alongside the music video. Michaels performed a medley of GFY and Scissors on The Tonight Show with Jimmy Fallon, alongside Morris. "Try Your Luck" was released alongside the entire extended play on May 23, 2025, with its own music video.

== Track listing ==
Second Self track listing
No.	Title	Writer(s)	Producer(s)	Length
1.	"Heaven II"	Julia Michaels; Pete Nappi; Jonathan Bellion; Jason Cornet; Carlo Colasacco	Pete Nappi; Tenroc; Carlo Colasacco; Jon Bellion	2:27
2.	"Scissors" (with Maren Morris)	Michaels; John Ryan; Jordan K. Johnson; Stefan Johnson	John Ryan; The Monsters & Strangerz	2:25
3.	"Try Your Luck"	Michaels; Justin Tranter; Robin Fredriksson; Mattias Larsson	Mattman & Robin	2:43
4.	"F.O.O.L."	Michaels; Caroline Ailin; Mark Williams; Raul Cubina	Ojivolta	3:14
5.	"GFY"	Michaels; Nappi	Nappi	2:54
6.	"Time"	Emmit Fenn	Emmit Fenn	3:06
Total length:				16:47

== Personnel ==
Credits adapted from Apple Music.

- Julia Michaels — vocals, songwriter, background vocals
- Maren Morris — vocals
- Pete Nappi — songwriter, producer, programming, keyboards, drums
- Jonathan Bellion — songwriter, producer
- Jason Cornet — songwriter, producer, programming, keyboards, drums, bass, guitar
- Carlo Colasacco — songwriter, producer, guitar
- John Ryan — songwriter, producer, recording engineer, programming, background vocals, guitar, bass, drums, percussion, synthesizer
- The Monsters & Strangerz — songwriters, producers, recording engineer, percussion, synthesizer
- Justin Tranter — songwriter, background vocals,
- Mattman & Robin — songwriters, producers, percussion, drums, guitar, background vocals, keyboards, bass. guitar, horn
- Caroline Ailin — soingwriter
- Ojivolta — songwriters, producers
- Emmit Fenn — songwriter, producer
- Jeff Gunnell — recording engineer
- Matt Huber — mixing engineer
- Drew Lavyne — mastering engineer

== Charts ==
Chart performance for Second Self
Chart (2025)	Peak position
UK Album Downloads (OCC)	86

== Release history ==
Second Self release history
Region	Date	Format(s)	Label	Ref.
Various	May 25, 2025	Digital download; streaming	GFY Records	
