= Mt. Joy (band) =

American indie rock band

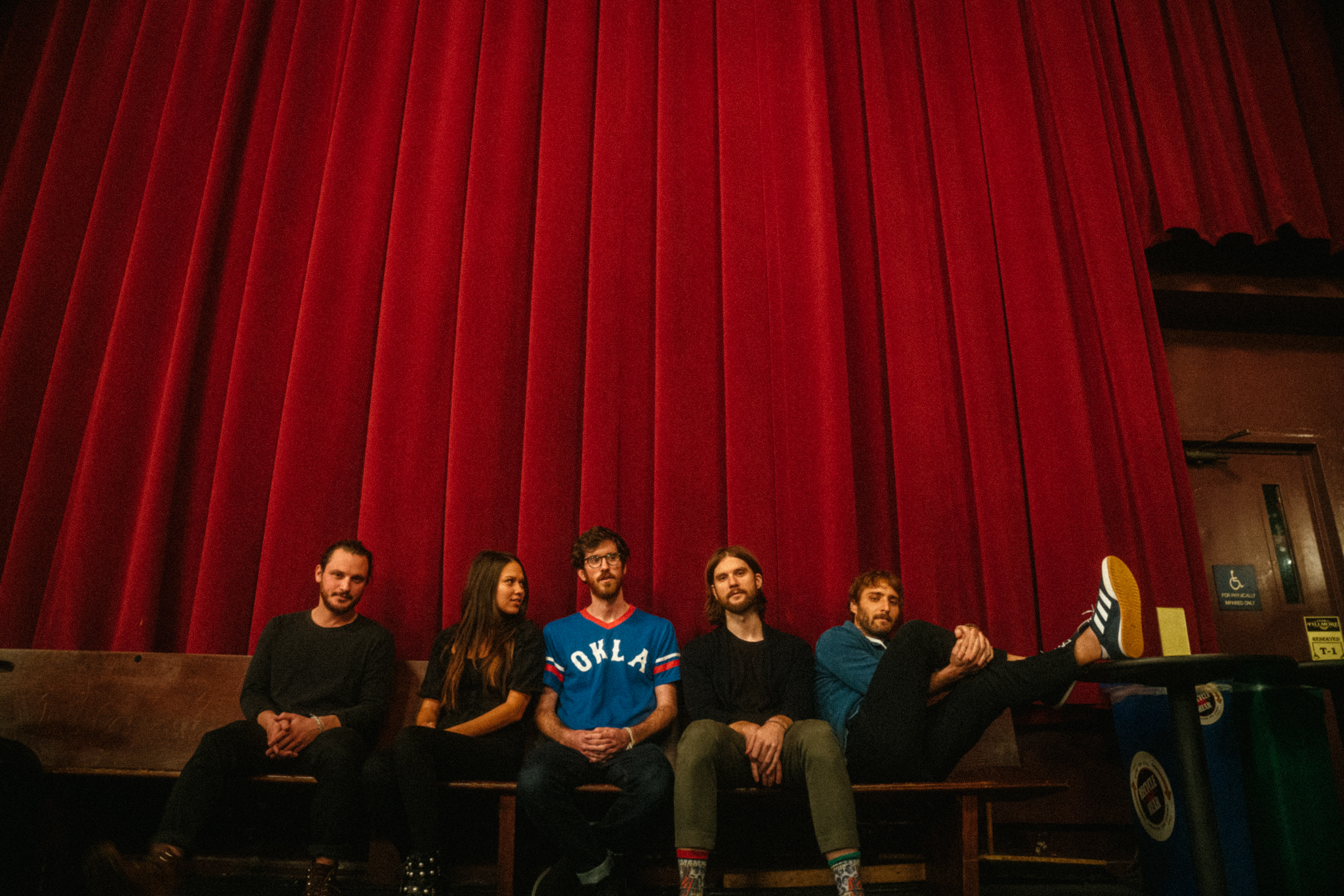
- Mt. Joy. From left to right: Cooper, Miclau, Byrnes, Quinn, Eliopoulos

Background information
- Origin: Philadelphia, Pennsylvania, U.S.
- Genres: Alternative rock; indie rock; folk rock; blues rock; Americana
- Years active: 2016–present
- Labels: Island; R&R
- Members: Matt Quinn; Sam Cooper; Michael Byrnes; Sotiris Eliopoulos; Jackie Miclau
- Website: mtjoyband.com

Mt. Joy is an American five-piece indie rock band based in Los Angeles with roots in Philadelphia. Its members are Matt Quinn (vocals, guitar), Sam Cooper (guitar), Sotiris Eliopoulos (drums), Jackie Miclau (keyboards) and Michael Byrnes (bass). The band debuted in 2016 with the single "Astrovan", recorded in Los Angeles by Quinn, Cooper, and Byrnes. This was followed up in 2017 by the trio of singles "Sheep", "Cardinal", and "Silver Lining". On March 2, 2018, Mt. Joy released its debut eponymous studio album. For the next two years, Mt. Joy performed at festivals and on tour as a support act, as well as headlining a North American and European tour. After a tour with the Lumineers was cut short due to COVID-19, Mt. Joy released its second studio album, Rearrange Us, on June 5, 2020. Its third studio album, Orange Blood, was released on June 17, 2022. Their fourth studio album, Hope We Have Fun, was released on May 30, 2025.

== History ==
=== 2015–16: Origins ===
Having first met at Conestoga High School outside of Philadelphia, Matt Quinn and Sam Cooper reunited in Los Angeles in 2016 and began working on music. Says Quinn, "It was just one of those cool, serendipitous life moments where a person that I’d been making music with in high school ended up in the same city as me, and I didn’t really know anybody else ... Just because we love music we were getting together and writing together." The pair named the project after a hill in Valley Forge National Historical Park near where they grew up. The two recorded their single "Astrovan" with the help of future bandmate Michael Byrnes, whom they met on Craigslist, and Byrnes' then-roommate, producer Caleb Nelson, in April of that year and released the song in September.

The single's rapid streaming success, as well as the success of their second single, "Sheep", drew the three to add drummer Sotiris Eliopoulos and keyboardist Jackie Miclau to the group, together playing Bonnaroo, Newport Folk Festival, and Lollapalooza, as well as opening for bands such as the Head and the Heart, the Shins, Whitney, and the Revivalists. In 2017, Mt. Joy signed to Dualtone Records.

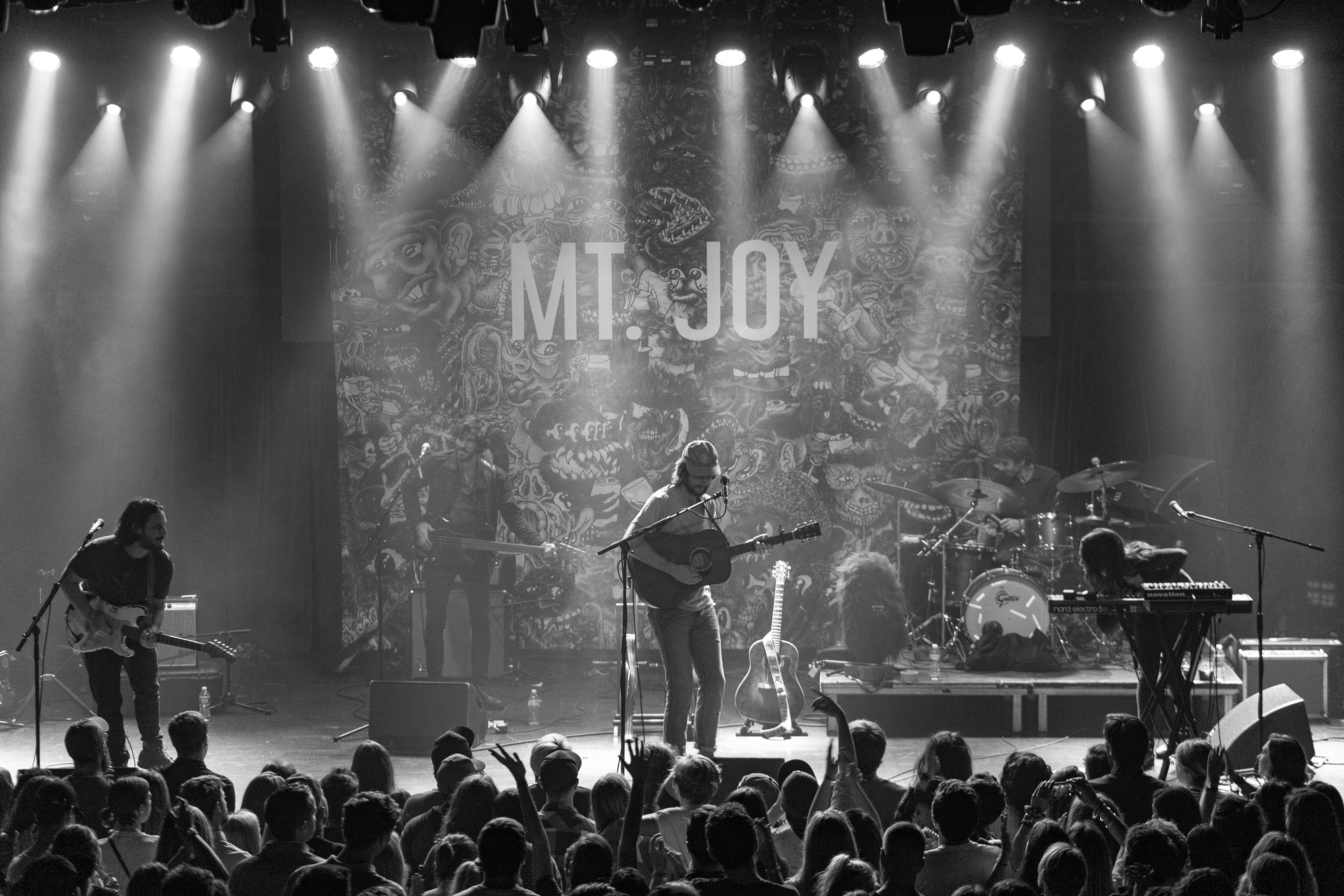
Mt. Joy at Royale in Boston, MA – September 26, 2018

=== 2018: Mt. Joy ===
Throughout 2017, the now five-piece band recorded additional tracks with producer Jon Gilbert at his home studio in Pasadena, California, and released its debut album, Mt. Joy, on March 2, 2018. The song "Silver Lining" went to #2 on the Billboard Triple A charts. As of July 2025, tracks from this album alone have garnered approximately 990 million streams on Spotify.

In 2018, Mt. Joy performed at Innings Music Festival, Shaky Knees Music Festival, ACL Fest, and Voodoo Fest, and performed on its own North American and European headlining tours.

=== 2019–2020: Rearrange Us ===
The band toured with Rainbow Kitten Surprise in January and February 2019, then performed its own headlining tour in March and April 2019.

During the summer of 2019, Mt. Joy recorded its second album, Rearrange Us, with producer Tucker Martine at his studio Flora Recording And Playback in Portland, Oregon. On October 16, 2019, the band released the song Rearrange Us from the album of the same name, followed by "Every Holiday" on November 13. The songs "Strangers" and "Let Loose" were released on February 18, 2020, with an announcement that the new album would debut on June 5. After releasing the songs "My Vibe", "Acrobats", "Death", and "Witness" before the release, the album debuted on June 5, with the band's first-week sales proceeds going to Campaign Zero, a nonprofit dedicated to reducing police violence. Rearrange Us debuted at #197 on the Billboard 200, marking the band's debut on the Billboard 200. The album also debuted at #1 on Billboard's New Artist Albums chart and Alternative New Artist Album chart, and was #2 on the Americana/Folk Albums chart. The vinyl was the top-selling vinyl in the country for the first week.

The band toured with the Lumineers in January, February, and March 2020, though the tour was cut short by the COVID-19 pandemic.

=== 2020–2022: Orange Blood ===
In April 2022, the band announced its third full-length album, Orange Blood, which was released on June 17. The album was recorded at Headroom Studios in Philadelphia. Four singles were released ahead of the album, "Lemon Tree", "Orange Blood," "Evergreen," and "Bathroom Light." Their headlining tour for the album ran from June through November.

=== 2023–present: Hope We Have Fun ===
Mt. Joy began 2023 by opening for Dave Matthews and Tim Reynolds in their annual Riviera Maya Festival on February 17. They next attended the Innings Festival on February 26. Next, the band went on a spring tour starting in Aspen, Colorado in March and ending the following month in Charlottesville, Virginia. During this tour, the band visited six states. After the tour, they went to a few festivals, such as Boston Calling (May 27), WonderWorks Festival (May 28), and FairWell Festival. Then they went on their main tour, starting on August 4 in Indianapolis and ending at a live music festival on October 29 in Oak, Florida. During this tour, the band went to 23 states, one province in Canada (Ontario), and Washington, D.C. In November, it toured Europe, supporting Greta Van Fleet in seven different countries over two weeks.

Mt. Joy was featured on the song "Santa Drives an Astrovan" on the 2024 charity Christmas album A Philly Special Christmas Party by the Philly Specials, with Quinn and Cooper credited as writers. On May 30, 2025, Mt. Joy released their fourth album, Hope We Have Fun. The album was preceded by six singles: "Highway Queen", "She Wants To Go Dancing", "More, More, More", "Coyote", "God Loves Weirdos", and "Lucy". The album features Gigi Perez on the song "In the Middle", and Nathaniel Rateliff on the song "Wild And Rotten".

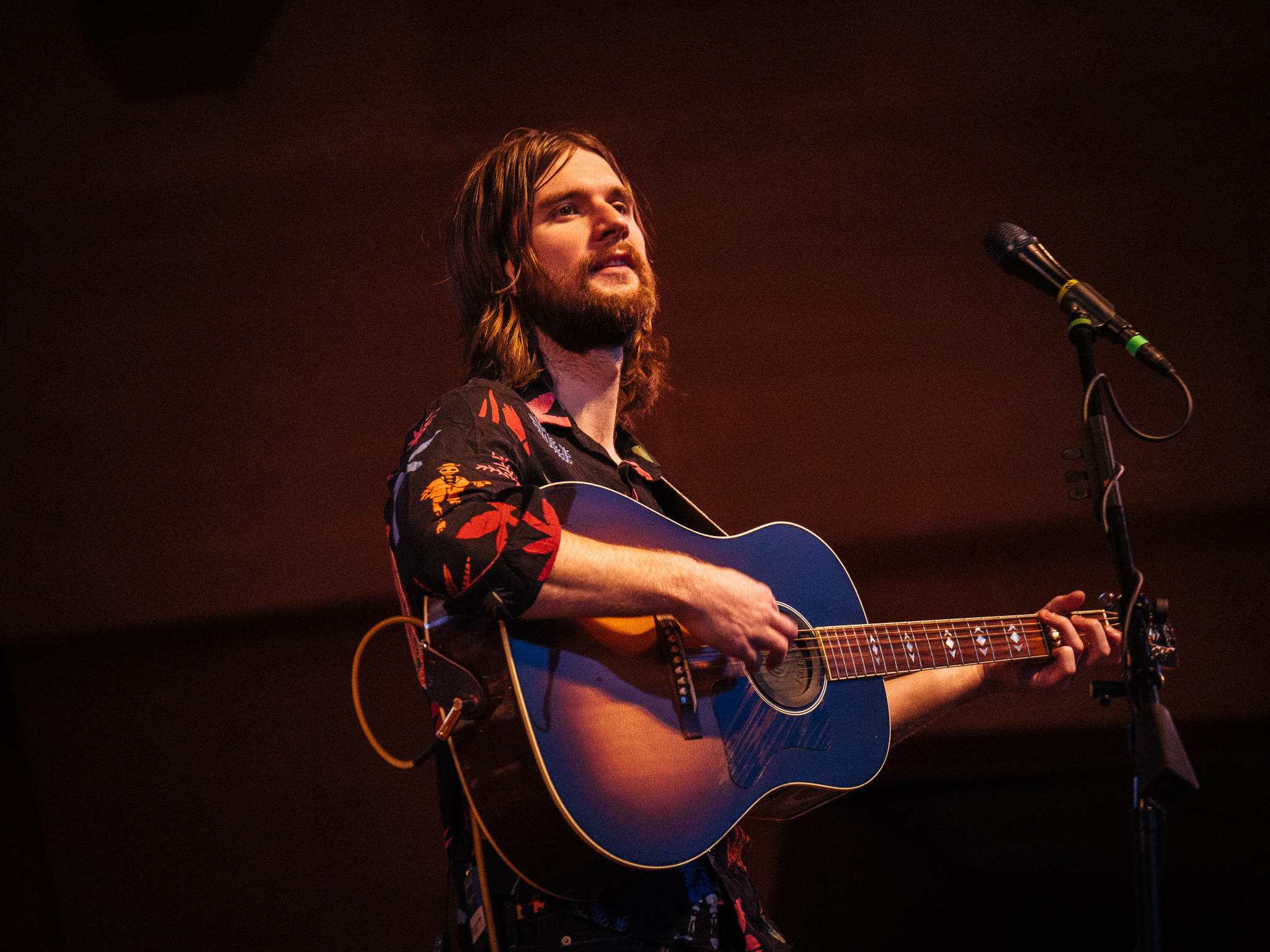
Matt Quinn of Mt. Joy on Vocals and Guitar

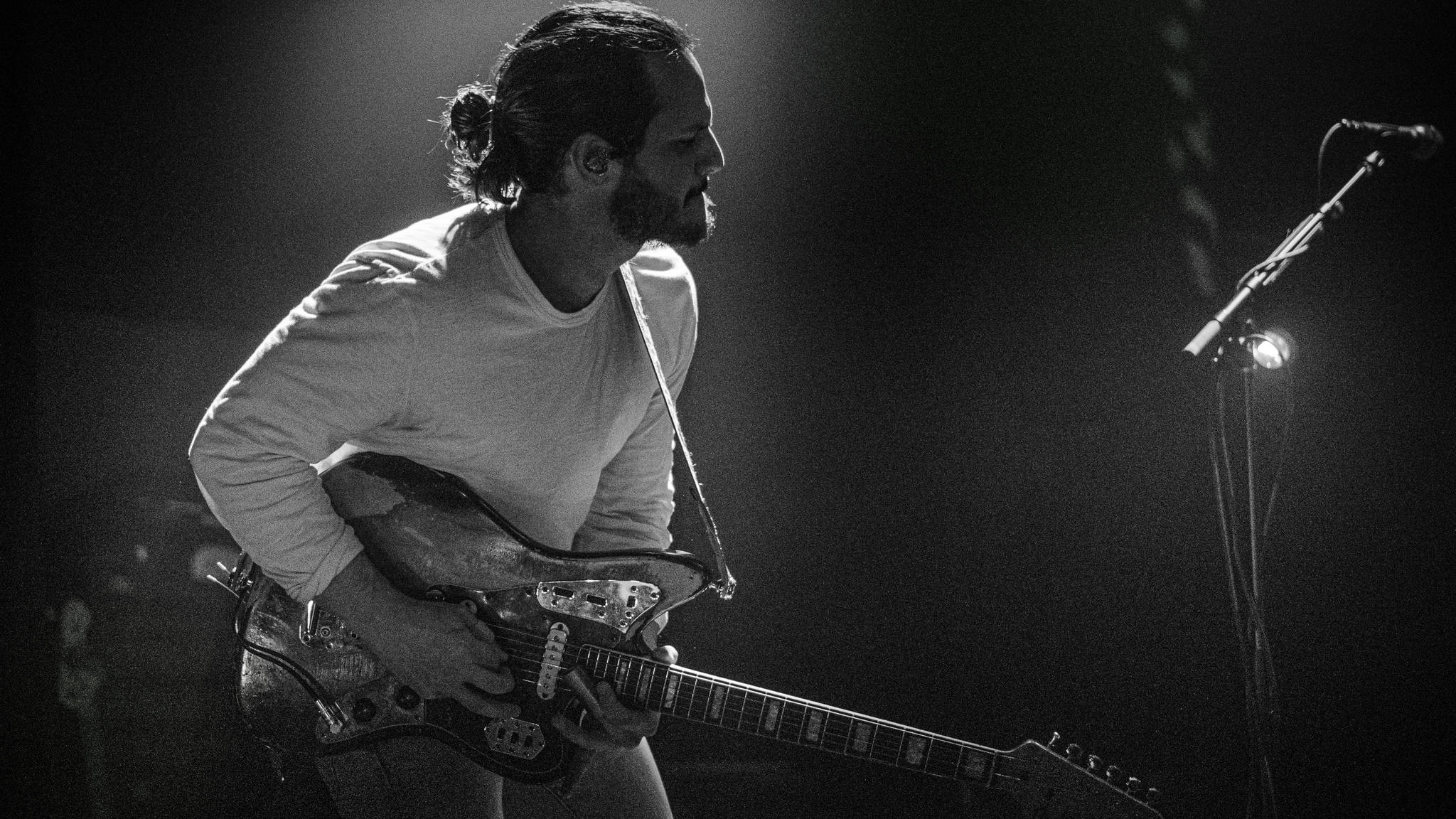
Sam Cooper of Mt. Joy on Guitar

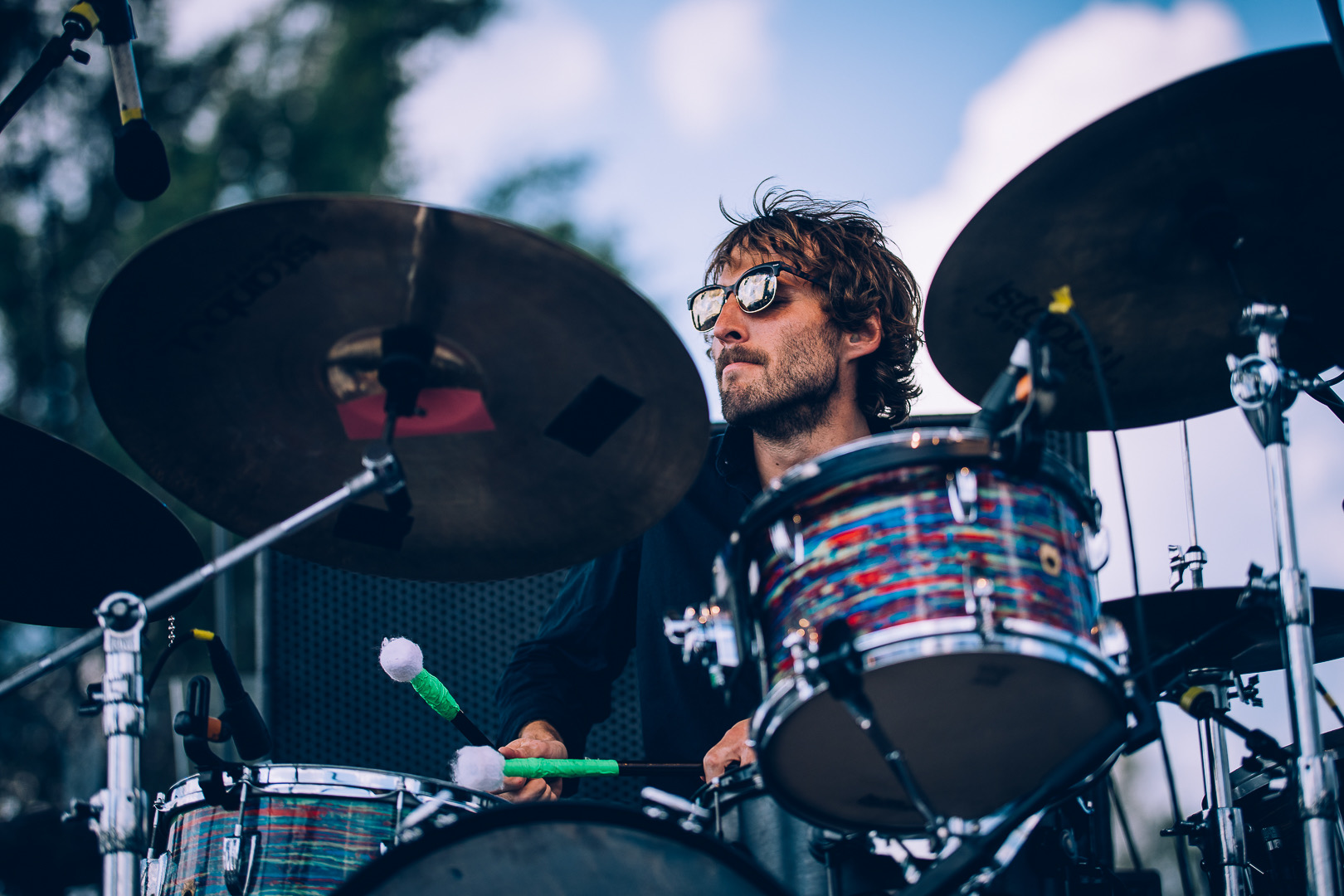
Sotiris Eliopoulos of Mt. Joy on Drums

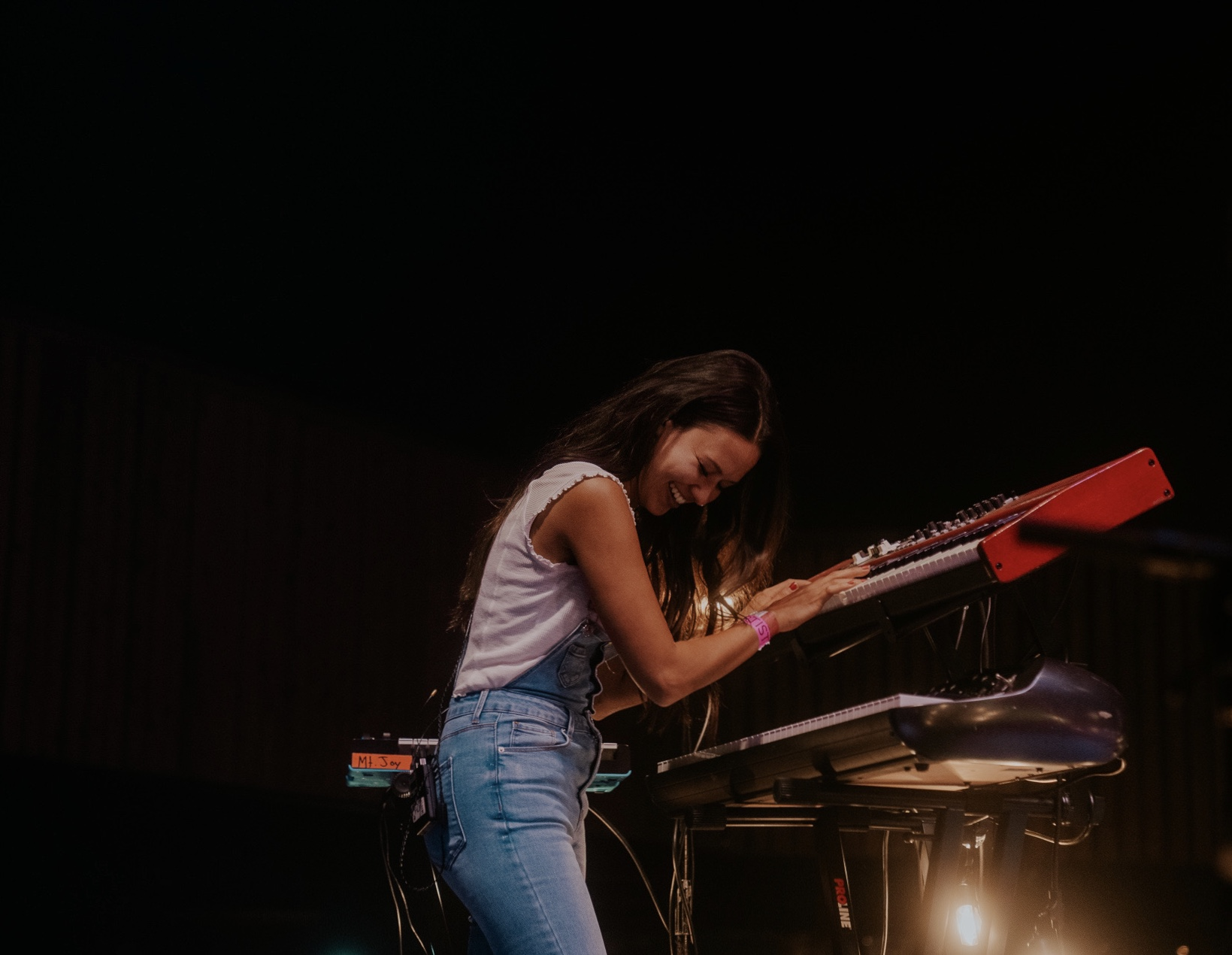
Jackie Miclau of Mt. Joy on Keys

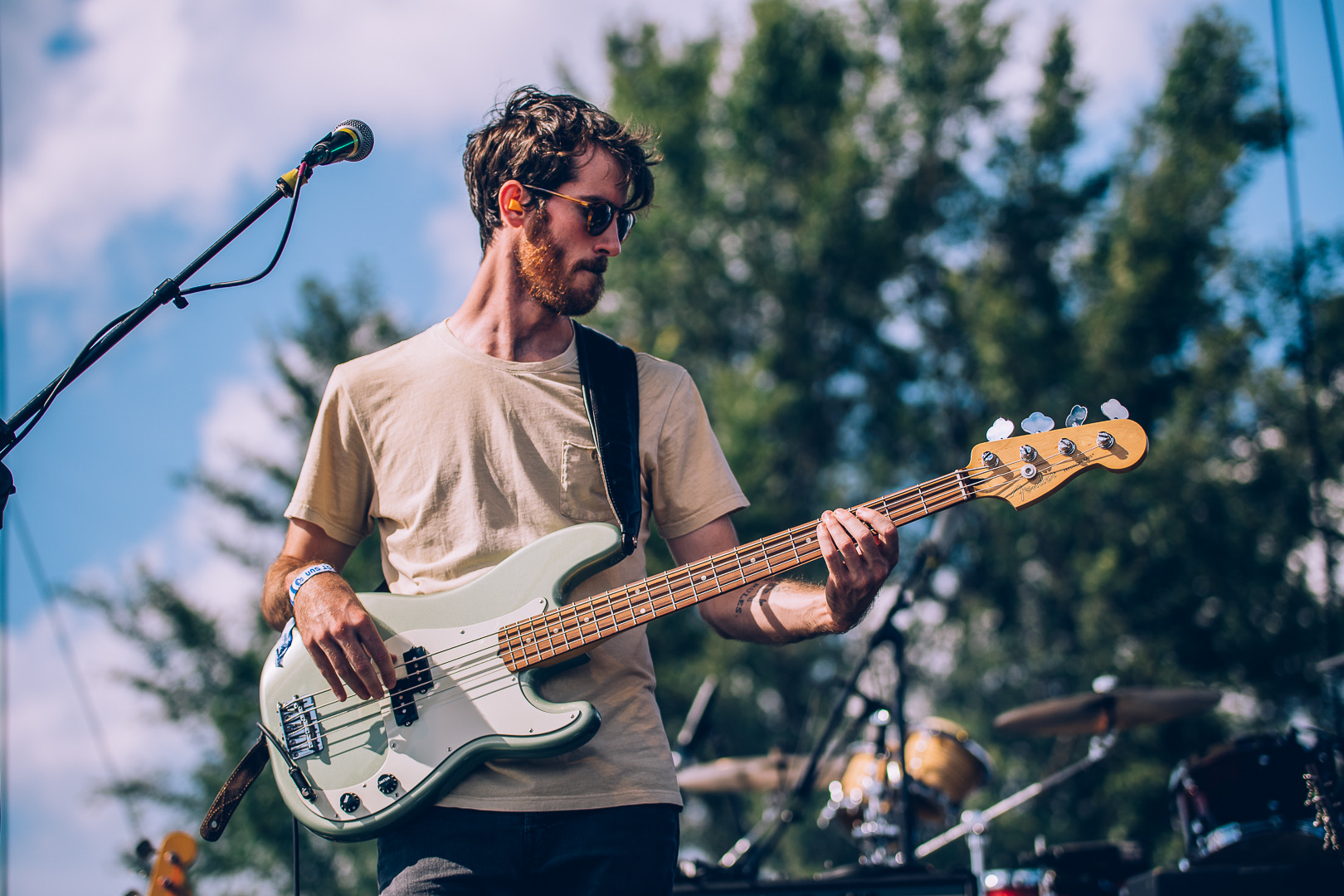
Michael Byrnes of Mt. Joy on Bass

== Activism ==
Mt. Joy hosted an Instagram Live stream consisting of a variety of artists and speakers. Resulting in over $30,000, all the proceeds were donated to Music Cares and Philabundance.

Leading up to the release of Rearrange Us, life became increasingly different with the spread of COVID-19. In a social media post, Mt. Joy said it originally hoped that "music could create a welcome distraction from reality", but just a few weeks before the album's release, the murder of George Floyd took place in Minneapolis on May 25. With nationwide protests demanding justice against police brutality and racial inequality, Mt. Joy reminded followers to "listen to and amplify black voices, learn, protest peacefully, and put your money where your mouth is." Concluding the post, Mt. Joy announced that "100% of album profits from the first week will be donated to Campaign Zero, a nonprofit dedicated to ending police violence."

Additionally, Mt. Joy serves as an ambassador for the nonpartisan voter registration organization HeadCount. On October 30, 2020, the band released the single "New President" before the November 3, 2020, election, encouraging fans to vote for someone other than Donald Trump.

== Members ==
- Matt Quinn – lead vocals, rhythm guitar, acoustic guitar, ukulele (2016–present)
- Sam Cooper – lead guitar, backing vocals (2016–present)
- Sotiris Eliopoulos – drums, percussion, backing vocals (2017–present)
- Jackie Miclau – keyboards, piano, backing vocals (2017–present)
- Michael Byrnes – bass, backing vocals (2017–present)

== Discography ==
=== Albums ===
- Mt. Joy (March 2, 2018) – US Billboard 200 No. 152
- Rearrange Us (June 5, 2020) – US Billboard 200 No. 197
- Orange Blood (June 17, 2022)
- Hope We Have Fun (May 30, 2025) – US Billboard 200 No. 160, UK Albums Chart No. 77

=== Singles ===
List of singles, with selected peak chart positions and certifications
Title	Year	Peak chart positions			Certifications	Album
Title	Year	US Airplay	US AAA	US Alt	Certifications	Album
"Astrovan"	2016	—	—	—		Mt. Joy
"Sheep"	2017 / 2018	—	40	—		Mt. Joy
"Cardinal"	2017 / 2018	—	—	—		Mt. Joy
"Silver Lining"	2017 / 2018	—	2	—	RIAA: Platinum	Mt. Joy
"Jenny Jenkins"	2018	—	5	—		Mt. Joy
"Strangers"	2020	—	5	—		Rearrange Us
"My Vibe"	2020	—	36	—		Rearrange Us
"New President"	2020	—	—	—		Non-album single
"Lemon Tree"	2022	36	2	—		Orange Blood
"Orange Blood"	2022	—	—	—		Orange Blood
"Evergreen"	2022	—	16	—		Orange Blood
"Highway Queen"	2024	29	2	—		Hope We Have Fun
"She Wants to Go Dancing"	2024	40	4	—		Hope We Have Fun
"More More More"	2025	—	—	—		Hope We Have Fun
"Coyote"	2025	44	7	—		Hope We Have Fun
"Lucy"	2025	11	6	8		Hope We Have Fun
"In the Middle" (feat. Gigi Perez)	2026	—	18	—		Hope We Have Fun
"—" denotes single that did not chart or was not released in that territory.

=== Music videos ===
Title	Year	Director	Ref.
"Cardinal"	2017	Susie Shelton	
"Silver Lining"	2018	James Rico	
"Bigfoot"	2018	Steve Girard	
"My Vibe"	2020	Steve Girard	
"Lemon Tree"	2022	Hannah Edelman	
"Orange Blood"	2022	Hannah Edelman	
"Evergreen"	2022	Francis Galluppi	
