= Intermission (Maren Morris EP) =

2024 EP by Maren Morris

EP by Maren Morris
- Released: August 2, 2024
- Genre: Pop
- Length: 14:59
- Label: Columbia
- Producers: Evan Blair; Joel Little; Naomi McPherson

Maren Morris chronology
Humble Quest (2022)	Intermission (2024)	Dreamsicle (2025)

Singles from Intermission
- 1. "Cut!" Released: June 21, 2024; 2. "I Hope I Never Fall in Love" Released: July 12, 2024

Intermission is the fifth extended play by American singer-songwriter Maren Morris. It was released on August 2, 2024, by Columbia Records. The EP consists of five tracks, all co-written by Morris. Evan Blair produced three out of the five tracks. She also collaborated with producers Joel Little and Naomi McPherson.

Intermission was preceded by the singles "Cut!" featuring guest vocals from Julia Michaels, and "I Hope I Never Fall in Love". It marks Morris's first project to be labeled as pop, after her departure from the industry of country music, which she discussed on her previous EP, The Bridge (2023). All five tracks were subsequently included on Morris' 2025 album Dreamsicle.

== Background and composition ==
Morris described the project as new start on her music career and personal life, saying: “It’s a break in the act, and for me, it’s definitely an act break and new chapter of my life, and I’m so ready to see what’s on the other page." As well, revealing that “It wasn’t easy to write, because I’m going through a lot, and this is the diary of that." She concluded that the EP "It’s just about my feelings".”

According to Morris, the lead single and opening track "Cut!" is about letting herself "fall apart", after pretending things are fine. "I Hope I Never Fall in Love" retails the singer hopes of remaining single after the end of a long relantionship. Critics speculated that the song is about her feelings post-divorce from country singer-songwriter Ryan Hurd. On "Push Me Over", she sings about exploring her sexuality. Meanwhile "Because, of Course" is a love song to her son and "This Is How a Woman Leaves" details her feelings on her split with her former husband.

== Promotion ==
To promote the extended play, two singles were released beforehand. "Cut!" served as the lead single, and features guest vocals from American singer-songwriter Julia Michaels. It marks their second collaboration after previously working together as co-writers on Morris 2022 single, "Circles Around This Town".

"Cut!" was released on June 21, with an official lyrics video. "I Hope I Never Fall in Love" was released as the second single of the extended play on July 12.

Alongside the EP release, lyrics videos for the remaining three songs were released on Morris' YouTube channel. She eventually continued promoting the project on her RSVP Redux Tour.

== Reception ==
Intermission received generally favorable reviews from music critics.

Justin Cober-Lake from Spectrum Culture described Intermission as "Morris takes a break for some catharsis, but also reveals the power yet to come. It’s a short release set at a fairly steady pitch, but it likely indicates a pivotal moment in the star’s story." He also praised the closing track "This Is How a Woman Leaves", as it showcase Morris "best vocal performance".

== Track listing ==
Intermission track listing
No.	Title	Lyrics	Producer(s)	Length
1.	"Cut!" (featuring Julia Michaels)	Maren Morris; Julia Michaels; Caroline Ailin; Joel Little	Joel Little	2:08
2.	"I Hope I Never Fall in Love"	Morris; Delacey; Evan Blair; Lucy Healey	Evan Blair	3:37
3.	"Push Me Over"	Morris; McPherson; Josette Maskin; Tobias Jesso Jr.; Catherine Hope Gavin	Naomi McPherson	3:37
4.	"Because, of Course"	Morris; Michael Pollack; Mike Elizondo; Laura Veltz	Blair	2:47
5.	"This Is How a Woman Leaves"	Morris; Madi Diaz; Sarah Buxton	Blair	2:49
Total length:				14:59

=== Notes ===
- All tracks are stylized in all lowercase.

== Personnel ==
=== Musicians ===
- Maren Morris — vocals (all tracks)
- Joel Little — programming, keyboards, percussion, synthesizer (1)
- Julia Michaels — background vocals, lead vocals (1)
- Evan Blair — bass, guitar (2, 4, 5)
- Steven Wolf — drums (2, 4, 5)
- Naomi McPherson — guitar, programming, keyboards (3)
- Josette Maskin — guitar (3)
- Geo Botelho — bass guitar (3)
- Katie Gavin — background vocals (3)
- Rob Moose — strings (5)
- Madi Diaz — background vocals (5)

=== Technical ===
- Joel Little — engineer (track 1)
- Denis Kosiak — engineer (1)
- Adam Burt — assistant engineer (1)
- Katie Harvey — assistant engineer (1)
- Nate Mingo — assistant engineer (1, 2)
- Dale Becker — mastering engineer (all tracks)
- Alex Ghenea — mixing engineer (all tracks)
- Kegn Venegas — assistant engineer (2)
- Jimmy Robbins — engineer, vocal producer (3)
- Naomi McPherson — assistant engineer (3)
- Geo Botelho — assistant engineer (3)
- Evan Blair — vocal recording engineer (2, 4, 5)

== Release history ==
Release dates and formats
Region	Date	Format	Label	Ref.
Various	August 2, 2024	Digital download; streaming	Columbia Records	

== See also ==
- Maren Morris discography
