= I Hope I Never Fall in Love =

Single by Maren Morris

from the EP Intermission
- Released: July 12, 2024
- Length: 3:37
- Label: Columbia
- Songwriters: Delacey; Evan Blair; Lucy Healey; Maren Morris
- Producer: Evan Blair

Maren Morris singles chronology
"Cut!" (2024)	"I Hope I Never Fall in Love" (2024)	"Kiss the Sky" (2024)

Lyric video
- "I Hope I Never Fall in Love" on YouTube

"I Hope I Never Fall in Love" (stylized in all lowercase) is a song by American singer Maren Morris. It was released on July 12, 2024, as the second single of Morris's fifth extended play (EP), Intermission (2024). The song was inspired by the aftermath of Morris's divorce from Ryan Hurd and reflects a period of emotional recovery in which she avoided pursuing another serious relationship. It is built around a 1960s-inspired melody and lyrics rejecting romantic idealism.

== Background ==
Morris shared that "I Hope I Never Fall in Love" was inspired by the aftermath of her divorce from Ryan Hurd. She described it as reflecting a period in which she wanted to avoid another serious relationship, instead embracing "the 'situationship' of it all". Morris also said audiences would "get to scream the chorus", adding that she looked forward to performing it live.

Following its release, Morris further described the song as being about "the afterglow of a shitshow" and "a bittersweet heartbreaker" born from "self-protection mode" while still wanting "to feel things". Although she emphasized that she did want to "fall in love again", Morris said she was "not ready" to put her heart through another relationship, calling the song a reflection of "this strange but constructive (and destructive) window of [her] life".

== Composition ==
Co-written by Morris, Delacey, Evan Blair, and Lucy Healey, "I Hope I Never Fall in Love" features a 1960s-inspired melody driven by tambourine-backed instrumentation. With a midtempo arrangement, the song lyrically documents the aftermath of heartbreak as the narrator vows to avoid falling in love again, rejecting romantic idealism with lines such as "Love, you only did me dirty" and "Forever was a fucking lie, so goodbye." According to Rolling Stone's Jon Blistein, the song is "anchored by a slowed-down" variation of the drumbeat from the Ronettes's 1963 single "Be My Baby". He noted that, rather than embracing "lovestruck fantasies", Morris rejects it as the song builds toward its climax, culminating in the lines, "Forever was a fucking lie, so goodbye / You only made it worse / I hope I never fall in love."

Morris performs the lead vocals, while Delacey provides background vocals. Blair also plays bass and guitar and served as the vocal engineer. Steve Wolf contributed drums. The song was mixed by Alex Ghenea, mastered by Dale Becker, and assisted by engineers Brandon Hernandez, Kegn Venegas, and Nate Mingo.

== Release ==
On July 2, 2024, Morris shared a 15-second preview of "I Hope I Never Fall in Love" on Instagram and TikTok, describing the track as "a situationship in sonic form" that was "coming soon to ruin your life". Responding to a fan on TikTok, she also wrote, "get in loser we're going healing".

"I Hope I Never Fall in Love" was released on July 12, 2024, as the second single from Morris's fifth extended play (EP), Intermission (2024).

== Personnel ==
Credits were adapted from Tidal.

- Maren Morris – lead vocals, songwriter
- Delacey – background vocals, songwriter
- Evan Blair – producer, bass, guitar, vocal engineer, songwriter
- Lucy Healey – songwriter
- Steve Wolf – drums
- Alex Ghenea – mixing engineer
- Dale Becker – mastering engineer
- Brandon Hernandez – assistant engineer
- Kegn Venegas – assistant engineer
- Nate Mingo – assistant engineer
