= Cut! (song) =

Single by Maren Morris featuring Julia Michaels

from the EP Intermission
- Released: June 21, 2024
- Length: 2:08
- Label: Columbia
- Songwriters: Caroline Ailin; Joel Little; Julia Michaels; Maren Morris
- Producer: Joel Little

Maren Morris singles chronology
| "Dancing with Myself" (2024) | "Cut!" (2024) | "I Hope I Never Fall in Love" (2024) |

Julia Michaels singles chronology
| "In a Perfect World" (2023) | "Cut!" (2024) | "Want This Beer" (2024) |

Lyric video
- "Cut!" on YouTube

"Cut!" (stylized in all lowercase) is a song by American singers Maren Morris and Julia Michaels, who appears as a featured artist. It was released on June 21, 2024, as the lead single of Morris's fifth extended play (EP), Intermission (2024). The song marked Morris's second collaboration with Michaels following "Circles Around This Town" (2020). Exploring the tension between outward composure and private emotional release, it was described by Morris as "a cathartic release" that gave her "permission to fall apart".

== Background and release ==
Morris teased "Cut!" ahead of its release on social media by sharing a promotional photograph with Michaels, showing herself standing on a table holding a chainsaw while Michaels sat nearby. In the caption, Morris wrote that she "can't wait to cathartically scream fuck at the top of [their] lungs together". She also revealed the track listing for her fifth extended play (EP), Intermission, confirming "Cut!" as its opening track. The song marks their second collaboration since Morris's 2020 single "Circles Around This Town", which Michaels co-wrote with Morris.

Morris said "Cut!" is about maintaining the appearance of having everything together during the day before allowing herself to "scream" and "fall apart" in private. She described the song as "a cathartic release" that gave her "permission to fall apart" despite societal expectations to remain composed.

== Composition ==
"Cut!" was written by Morris, Michaels, Caroline Ailin, and Joel Little, with production by Little. Morris and Michaels perform both lead and background vocals. Little also served as the recording engineer and played keyboards, percussion, and synthesizer, in addition to programming the track. The song was mixed by Alex Ghenea, mastered by Dale Becker, and engineered for vocals by Denis Kosiak, with Adam Burt, Katie Harvey, and Nate Mingo serving as assistant engineers.

"Cut!" is a midtempo song with a prominent synth sounds and chorus. Its lyrics explore the pressure to maintain a composed public image while seeking permission to openly experience and express one's emotions.

== Personnel ==
Credits were adapted from Tidal.

- Maren Morris – lead vocals, background vocals, songwriter
- Julia Michaels – lead vocals, background vocals, songwriter
- Joel Little – producer, engineer, keyboards, percussion, programmer, synthesizer, songwriter
- Caroline Ailin – songwriter
- Alex Ghenea – mixing engineer
- Dale Becker – mastering engineer
- Denis Kosiak – vocal engineer
- Adam Burt – assistant engineer
- Katie Harvey – assistant engineer
- Nate Mingo – assistant engineer

== Charts ==
Weekly chart performance
| Chart (2024) | Peak position |
|---|---|
| New Zealand Hot Singles (RMNZ) | 15 |
