= History of the hippie movement =

The hippie subculture (also known as the flower people) began its development as a teenager and youth movement in the United States from the mid-1960s to early 1970s and then developed around the world.

Its origins may be traced to European social movements in the 19th and early 20th century such as Bohemians, with influence from Eastern religion and spirituality. It is directly influenced and inspired by the Beat Generation, and American involvement in the Vietnam War. From around 1967, its fundamental ethos – including harmony with nature, communal living, artistic experimentation particularly in music, sexual experimentation, and the widespread use of recreational drugs – spread around the world during the counterculture of the 1960s and 1970s, which has become closely associated with the subculture.

== Precursors ==
=== Classical culture ===
The hippies movement has found historical precedents as far back as the Mazdakist movement in Persia, whose leader the Persian reformer Mazdak, advocated communal living, the sharing of resources, vegetarianism, and free love. A 1967 article in Time magazine asserted that the hippie movement has a historical precedent in the counterculture of the Ancient Greeks, espoused by philosophers like Diogenes of Sinope and the Cynics. The article also claimed that the hippies were influenced by the ideals of John the Baptist, Jesus Christ, Hillel the Elder, Buddha, St. Francis of Assisi, Henry David Thoreau, Gandhi, and others. Nathan Adler believed the hippies were heirs of early spiritual movements such as the Waldensians. Some have pointed to the short-lived Merrymount Colony in 1625 (allegorically portrayed by Nathaniel Hawthorne in "The Maypole of Merry Mount)" as the first hippie experience on the American continent.

=== 19th- and early 20th-century Europe ===
In the late 1800s and early 1900s, the German Lebensreform movement emphasized the goodness of nature; the harms to society, people, and nature caused by industrialization; the importance of the whole person, body and mind; and the goodness of "the old ways". The German youth movement known as Der Wandervogel grew out of Lebensreform as a countercultural reaction to the organized social and cultural clubs that centered on German folk music. In contrast to these formal clubs, Wandervogel emphasized amateur music and singing, creative dress, and communal outings involving hiking and camping. Inspired by the works of Friedrich Nietzsche, Goethe, Hermann Hesse, and Eduard Baltzer, Wandervogel attracted thousands of young Germans who rejected the rapid trend toward urbanization and yearned for the pagan, back-to-nature spiritual life of their ancestors.

=== Nature Boys of Southern California ===
During the first several decades of the 20th century, these beliefs were introduced to the United States as Germans settled around the country, some opening the first health food stores. (For example, Santa Barbara's first health food store was opened in 1934 by Hermann Sexauer, who was born in Teningen, Germany on March 4, 1883, and died in December 1971; he left Germany in 1906, arrived in New York, ended up in California and lived a pacifist, raw vegan, non-conformist lifestyle.) A number of them moved to Southern California, where they could practice an alternative lifestyle in a warm climate. In turn, young Americans adopted the beliefs and practices of the new immigrants. One group, called the Nature Boys, who included William Pester, took to the California desert, raised organic food, and espoused a back-to-nature lifestyle. eden ahbez, a member of this group, wrote a hit song, "Nature Boy'", which was recorded in 1947 by Nat King Cole, popularizing the homegrown back-to-nature movement to mainstream America. Eventually, a few of these Nature Boys, including Gypsy Boots, made their way to Northern California in 1967, just in time for the Summer of Love in San Francisco.

=== Beat Generation ===
The Beat Generation, especially those associated with the San Francisco Renaissance, gradually gave way to the 1960s era counterculture, accompanied by a shift in terminology from "beatnik" to "freak" and "hippie". A number of the original Beats remained active participants, notably Allen Ginsberg, who became a fixture of the anti-war movement. On the other hand, Jack Kerouac broke with Ginsberg and criticized the 1960s protest movements as an "excuse for spitefulness". Bob Dylan became close friends with Allen Ginsberg, and Ginsberg became close friends with Timothy Leary. Both Leary and Ginsberg were introduced to LSD by Michael Hollingshead in the early 1960s, and both became instrumental in popularizing psychedelic substances to the hippie movement.

In 1963, Ginsberg was living in San Francisco with Neal Cassady and Charles Plymell. Around that time, Ginsberg connected with Ken Kesey, who was participating in CIA sponsored LSD trials, at the Menlo Park Veterans' Hospital where he worked as a night aide while a student at Stanford. Cassady drove the bus for Ken Kesey's Merry Pranksters, and he attempted to recruit Kerouac into their group, but Kerouac angrily rejected the invitation and accused them of attempting to destroy the American culture he celebrated.

According to Ed Sanders, the change in the public label from "beatnik" to "hippie" occurred after the 1967 Human Be-In in San Francisco's Golden Gate Park, where Ginsberg, Gary Snyder, and Michael McClure led the crowd in chanting "Om". Ginsberg was also at the infamous 1968 Democratic National Convention, and was friends with Abbie Hoffman and other members of the Chicago Seven. Stylistic differences between beatniks, marked by somber colors, dark shades and goatees, gave way to colorful psychedelic clothing and long hair worn by hippies. While the beats were known for "playing it cool" and keeping a low profile, hippies became known for displaying their individuality.

One early book hailed as evidencing the transition from "beatnik" to "hippie" culture was Been Down So Long It Looks Like Up to Me by Richard Fariña, brother-in-law of Joan Baez. Written in 1963, it was published April 28, 1966, two days before its author was killed in a motorcycle crash.

== 1960 to 1966 ==
=== Ken Kesey and the Merry Pranksters ===
The Merry Pranksters were a group who originally formed around American novelist Ken Kesey, considered one of the most prominent figures in the psychedelic movement, and sometimes lived communally at his homes in California and Oregon. Notable members include Kesey's best friend Ken Babbs, Neal Cassady, Mountain Girl (born Carolyn Adams but best known as Mrs. Jerry Garcia), Wavy Gravy, Paul Krassner, Stewart Brand, Del Close, Paul Foster, George Walker, and others. Their early escapades were chronicled by Tom Wolfe in The Electric Kool-Aid Acid Test.

Ken Kesey and the Merry Pranksters are remembered chiefly for the sociological significance of a lengthy roadtrip they took in 1964, traveling across the United States in a psychedelically painted school bus enigmatically labeled Further, and for the "Acid Tests". Kesey believed that psychedelics were best used as a tool for transforming society as a whole, and believed that if a sufficient percentage of the population had the psychedelic experience then revolutionary social and political changes would occur. Therefore, they made LSD available to anyone interested in partaking – most famously through the "electric kool-aid" made available at a series of "Acid Tests"; musical and multi-media events where participants were given "acid", the street name for LSD. The tests were held at various venues in California, and were sometimes advertised with colorful crayoned signs asking "Can you pass the acid test?" The first Acid Test was held in Palo Alto, California in November 1965. (LSD was legal in the United States until October 6, 1966.) The young psychedelic music band the Grateful Dead supplied the music during these events.

=== Red Dog Experience ===
The Red Dog Saloon was a bar and music venue located in the isolated, old-time mining town of Virginia City, Nevada. In April 1963, Chandler A. Laughlin III established a kind of tribal, family identity among approximately 50 people who attended a traditional, all-night peyote ceremony which combined a psychedelic experience with traditional Native American spiritual values.

During the summer of 1965, Laughlin recruited much of the original talent that led to a unique amalgam of traditional folk music and the developing psychedelic rock scene. He and his cohorts created what became known as The Red Dog Experience, featuring previously unknown musical acts – Big Brother and the Holding Company, Jefferson Airplane, Quicksilver Messenger Service, The Charlatans, Grateful Dead and others. There was no clear delineation between "performers" and "audience" and the music, psychedelic experimentation, unique sense of personal style, and Bill Ham's first primitive light shows combined to create a new sense of community.

=== Anti-war protests ===
Although there were multiple diverse groups and elements protesting the US military involvement in Vietnam as it began to escalate, a number of the protesters, rightly or wrongly, came to be associated with aspects of the "hippie" movement in the popular view. A number of them had been highly active in the Civil Rights Movement in the first half of the 1960s, traveling across the country to take part in sit-ins and marches against segregation in the South. The first draft card burnings took place May 12, 1964, in New York City. Others followed, including more draft-card burnings in May 1965 at the University of California, Berkeley (which had already seen a precedent to the subsequent social turmoil, in form of the Free Speech Movement), and a coffin was marched to the Berkeley draft board. As similar protests continued through the summer, President Lyndon Johnson responded by signing a new law on August 31, 1965, penalizing the burning of draft cards with up to 5 years in prison and a $1,000 fine, although such burnings went on regardless. In later years, the Viet Cong flag of the "enemy" was even adopted as a symbol by more radical anti-war protesters.

However, the core "hippie" philosophy remained staunchly aloof to politics, and politicians, throughout this time. As sociologist Lewis Yablonsky noted in 1968 in his "Psychedelic Creed", "A true hippie believer would not get 'hung-up' with heavy game playing, the new left, war protests or civil rights battles. He simply would strengthen his own perceptions of honesty and truth."

=== Generation ===
The new "hippie" values, e.g. natural childbirth, made an early Broadway appearance October 6, 1965, with the opening of a popular new play, Generation by US playwright William Goodhart, starring Henry Fonda (as Jim Bolton), which, according to one of its reviews in Time, "converts a Greenwich Village loft into a sparring ground for the Establishment and the hippie, the parent and the child." Owing to the success of this play, it was made into the 1969 film Generation (also released under the title A Time for Giving and A Time for Caring) with David Janssen in the role of Jim Bolton (also featuring Kim Darby, Carl Reiner, James Coco and Sam Waterston).

=== Underground press ===
Another signal of the rising movement was the sudden appearance of an underground hippie press in several U.S. cities. Among the first of these was the Los Angeles Free Press, which began in May 1964 as a broadside entitled The Faire Free Press. This was soon followed by the Berkeley Barb in August 1965, the East Village Other of New York, in October 1965, The Fifth Estate, in Detroit in November 1965, and East Lansing's The Paper in December 1965. By 1966 the Underground Press Syndicate had been organized; 80 presses of U.S. and Canada came to a conference sponsored by Middle Earth in Iowa City. Liberation News Service — located in Washington, D.C., then New York, then split between New York and a commune in rural Massachusetts – served up alternative stories to the underground press world.

=== Psychedelic rock ===
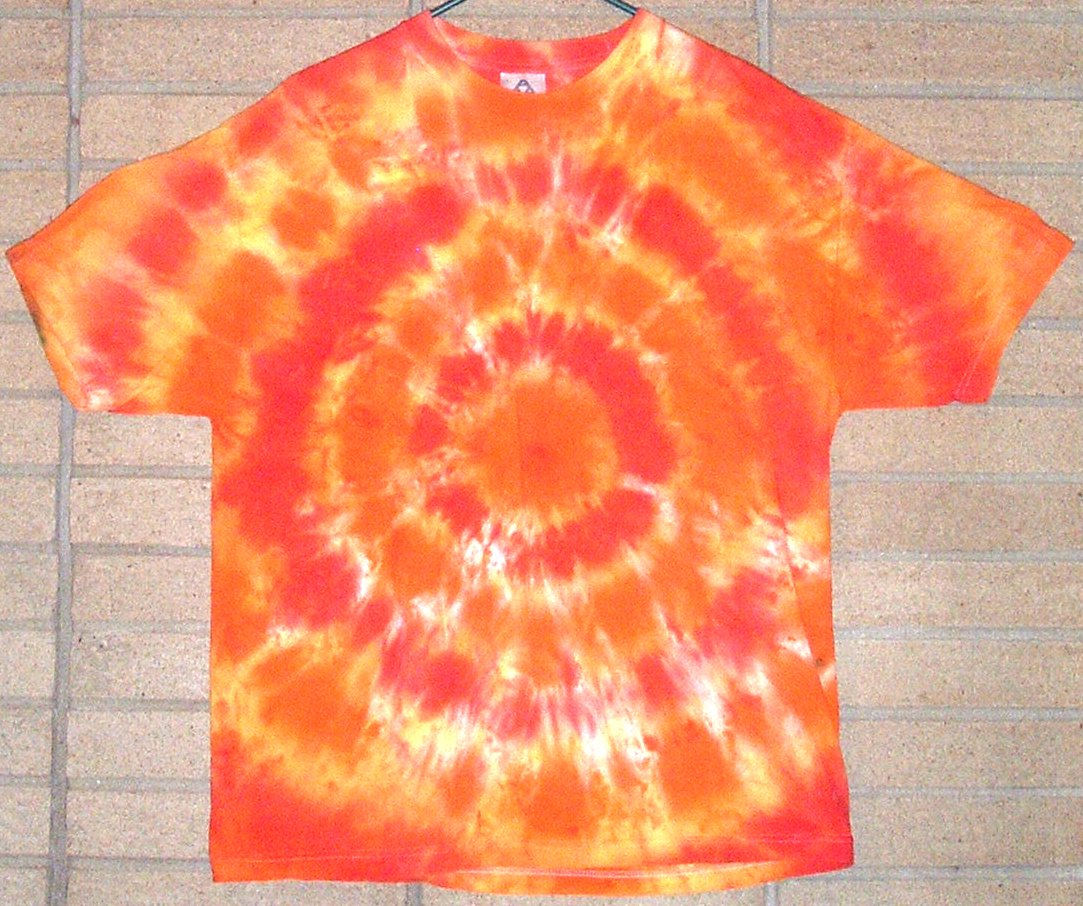
An example of a tie dyed t-shirt. Tie-dyeing in the late 1960s and early 1970s is considered part of the psychedelic movement.

A Tribute to Dr. Strange

When they returned to San Francisco at the end of Summer 1965, Red Dog participants Luria Castell, Ellen Harman and Alton Kelley created a collective called "The Family Dog". Modeled on their Red Dog experiences, on October 16, 1965, The Family Dog hosted "A Tribute to Dr. Strange" at Longshoreman's Hall. Attended by approximately 1,000 of the Bay Area's original "hippies", this was San Francisco's first psychedelic rock performance, a costumed dance and light show featuring Jefferson Airplane, The Great Society, and The Marbles. Two other events followed before year's end, one at California Hall and one at the Matrix.

Trips Festival

A much larger psychedelic event, "The Trips Festival", took place on January 21–23, 1966, at Longshoreman's Hall, organized by Stewart Brand, Ken Kesey, Owsley Stanley, Zach Stewart and others. Ten thousand people attended this sold-out event, with a thousand more turned away each night. On Saturday January 22, the Grateful Dead and Big Brother and the Holding Company came on stage, and 6,000 people arrived to imbibe punch spiked with LSD and to witness one of the first fully developed light shows of the era.

Fillmore Auditorium and Avalon Ballroom

By February 1966, the Family Dog became Family Dog Productions under organizer Chet Helms, promoting happenings at the Avalon Ballroom and the Fillmore Auditorium in initial cooperation with Bill Graham. These and other venues provided settings where participants could partake in the full psychedelic music experience. Bill Ham perfected his liquid light projection shows which, combined with film projection, and became synonymous with the San Francisco ballroom experience.

When San Francisco's Fox Theater went out of business, hippies bought up its costume stock, reveling in the freedom to dress up for weekly musical performances at their favorite ballrooms. As San Francisco Chronicle music columnist Ralph J. Gleason put it, "They danced all night long, orgiastic, spontaneous and completely free form."

=== Haight-Ashbury ===
Some of the early San Francisco hippies were former students at San Francisco State College (later renamed San Francisco State University) who were intrigued by the developing psychedelic hippie music scene and left school after they started taking psychedelic drugs. These students joined the bands they loved and began living communally in the large, inexpensive Victorian apartments in the Haight. Young Americans around the country began moving to San Francisco, and by June 1966, around 15,000 hippies had moved into the Haight. The Charlatans, Jefferson Airplane, Big Brother and the Holding Company, and the Grateful Dead all moved to San Francisco's Haight-Ashbury neighborhood during this period.

Love Pageant Rally

On October 6, 1966, the state of California made LSD a controlled substance, making the drug illegal. In response to the criminalization of psychedelics, San Francisco hippies staged a gathering in the Golden Gate Park panhandle, called "The Love Pageant Rally", attracting an estimated 700–800 people. As explained by Allan Cohen, co-founder of the San Francisco Oracle, the purpose of the rally was twofold – to draw attention to the fact that LSD had just been made illegal, and to demonstrate that people who used LSD were not criminals, nor were they mentally ill. According to Cohen, those who took LSD were mostly idealistic people who wanted to learn more about themselves and their place in the universe, and they used LSD as an aid to meditation and to creative, artistic expression. The Grateful Dead played, and some sources claim that LSD was consumed at the rally.

Mantra-Rock Dance

One frequently encountered theme was Asian spirituality, and Zen, dharma, "nirvana", karma and yoga were "buzzwords" of the counterculture. For most this infatuation with Asia was somewhat superficial, limited to their wearing colourful and inexpensive clothing from India and burning Indian made incense. One more substantive event in this connection was The Mantra-Rock Dance, January 29, 1967. An audience of nearly 3,000 gathered at the Avalon Ballroom in San Francisco, filling the hall to its capacity for a fundraising effort for the first Hare Krishna center on the West Coast of the United States. The Mantra-Rock Dance featured some of the most prominent Californian rock groups of the time, such as the Grateful Dead and Big Brother and the Holding Company. The bands performed for free and countercultural leaders boosted the event's popularity; among them were LSD promoters Timothy Leary and Augustus Owsley Stanley III. Poet Allen Ginsberg led the singing of the Hare Krishna mantra onstage along with the founder acarya of the Krishna Consciousness movement, A.C. Bhaktivedanta Swami Prabhupada. Strobe lights and a psychedelic liquid light show along with pictures of Krishna and the words of the Hare Krishna mantra were projected onto the walls of the venue. Later Ginsberg called the Mantra-Rock Dance "the height of Haight-Ashbury spiritual enthusiasm ..."

Diggers

It is nothing new. We have a private revolution going on. A revolution of individuality and diversity that can only be private. Upon becoming a group movement, such a revolution ends up with imitators rather than participants ... It is essentially a striving for realization of one's relationship to life and other people ...

— Bob Stubbs, "Unicorn Philosophy"

Hippie action in the Haight centered on the Diggers, a guerrilla street theatre group that combined spontaneous street theatre, anarchistic action, and art happenings in their agenda to create a "free city". By late 1966, the Diggers opened stores which simply gave away their stock; provided free food, medical care, transport and temporary housing; they also organized free music concerts and works of political art. The Diggers criticized the term 'hippie' with their October 1967, 'Death of Hippie' event.

Celebrating both that and the end of the Summer of Love the Death of Hippie event was intended to signal to the rest of the country that it was over in San Francisco and that people needed to bring the revolution to their own locales from now on.

In late September 1967, a number of the shops in the district began to display a stack of 4x5 cards on their counters proclaiming "Funeral Notice for Hippie". "Friends are invited to attend services beginning at sunrise, October 6, 1967, at Buena Vista Park". An organization known as the Haight Ashbury Switchboard actively supported the Digger's funeral concept. A funeral procession went from the park down Haight St and ended in the Panhandle with supporters carrying a trinket filled casket. It was emblematic of the fate of the hippie movement in San Francisco.

By mid-1968, it was widely noted that most of the original "Flower Children" had long since departed the Haight Ashbury district, having gone on to agrarian/back to the earth movements, returned to their studies or embarking on their careers. These were subsequently replaced by a more cynical and exploitative crowd.

=== Los Angeles ===
Los Angeles also had a vibrant hippie scene during the mid-1960s. The Venice coffeehouses and beat culture sustained the hippies, giving birth to bands like The Doors. West Hollywood became the quintessential L.A. hippie gathering area, particularly on the Sunset Strip where the Whisky a Go Go was located, and The Troubadour on Santa Monica Boulevard. The Strip was the location of the protest described in Buffalo Springfield's early 1967 hippie anthem, "For What It's Worth" by Stephen Stills. One of the first "Love Ins" took place in Elysian Park and spread from there. Multiple hippies lived in that portion of Los Angeles known as East Hollywood as well as Laurel Canyon.

=== Millbrook ===
Before the Summer of Love, Timothy Leary and Richard Alpert formed the International Foundation for Internal Freedom in Newton, Massachusetts, inhabiting two houses but later moving to a 64-room mansion at Millbrook, New York, with a communal group of about 25 to 30 people in residence until they were shut down in 1968.

=== Drop City ===
In 1965, four art students and filmmakers, Gene Bernofsky, JoAnn Bernofsky, Richard Kallweit and Clark Richert, moved to a 7-acre (2.8 ha) tract of land near Trinidad, Colorado. Their intention was to create a live-in work of Drop Art, continuing an art concept they had developed earlier, and informed by "happenings". As Drop City gained notoriety in the 1960s underground, people from around the world came to stay and work on the construction projects. Inspired by the architectural ideas of Buckminster Fuller and Steve Baer, residents constructed geodesic domes and zonahedra to house themselves, using geometric panels made from the metal of automobile roofs and other inexpensive materials. In 1967 the group, consisting of 10 core people and multiple contributors, won Buckminster Fuller's Dymaxion award for their constructions.

== 1967 ==
=== Summer of Love ===
On January 14, 1967, the outdoor Human Be-In in San Francisco popularized hippie culture across the United States, with 30,000 hippies gathering in Golden Gate Park. The KFRC Fantasy Fair and Magic Mountain Music Festival from June 10–11, and the Monterey Pop Festival from June 16–18, introduced the music of the counterculture – and the new concept of a rock festival – to a wide audience, and marked the start of the "Summer of Love". Scott McKenzie's rendition of John Phillips' song, "San Francisco", became a hit in the United States and Europe. The lyrics, "If you're going to San Francisco, be sure to wear some flowers in your hair", inspired thousands of young people from all over the world to travel to San Francisco, sometimes wearing flowers in their hair and distributing flowers to passersby, earning them the name, "flower children".

Bands like the Grateful Dead, Big Brother and the Holding Company (with Janis Joplin), and Jefferson Airplane continued to live in the Haight, but by the end of the summer, the incessant media coverage led the Diggers to declare the "death" of the hippie with a parade. According to the late poet Stormi Chambless, the hippies buried an effigy of a hippie in the Panhandle to demonstrate the end of their reign. Regarding this period of history, the July 7, 1967, Time magazine featured a cover story entitled, "The Hippies: The Philosophy of a Subculture". The article described the guidelines of the hippie code: "Do your own thing, wherever you have to do it and whenever you want. Drop out. Leave society as you have known it. Leave it utterly. Blow the mind of every straight person you can reach. Turn them on, if not to drugs, then to beauty, love, honesty, fun."

It is estimated that around 100,000 people traveled to San Francisco in the summer of 1967. The media was right behind them, casting a spotlight on the Haight-Ashbury district and popularizing the "hippie" label. With this increased attention, hippies found support for their ideals of love and peace but were also criticized for their anti-work, pro-drug, and permissive ethos. Misgivings about the hippie culture, particularly with regard to drug abuse and lenient morality, fueled the moral panics of the late 1960s.

A complete picture of the hippie movement cannot exclude the influence and interaction of popular recording artists such as the Beatles, Rolling Stones, the Beach Boys, etc with Maharishi Mahesh Yogi. In fact flower power, hair, clothing, beads, were appropriated into the hippie movement largely from the influence of Indian gurus like Maharishi.

=== New Communalism ===
When the Summer of Love finally ended, thousands of hippies left San Francisco, a large minority of them heading "back to the land". These hippies created the largest number of intentional communities or communes in the history of the United States, forming alternative, egalitarian farms and homesteads in Northern California, Colorado, New Mexico, New York, Tennessee and other states. According to Timothy Miller, communes were organized in multiple different ways, some along religious, political, and even sexual orientation. Poet and writer Judson Jerome, who studied the American commune movement, estimates that by the early 1970s, about 750,000 people lived in more than ten thousand communes across the United States.

The Farm

In 1967, Stephen Gaskin began to develop a philosophy of hippie perspectives at San Francisco State College, where he taught English, creative writing, and General Semantics. Gaskin's "Monday Night Class" became a broad, open discussion group involving up to 1,500 students and other participants from the San Francisco Bay Area. In 1970, Gaskin and his wife, Ina May Gaskin, led a caravan of 60 buses, vans and trucks on a cross country speaking tour. Along the way, they checked out various places that might be suitable for settlement. When they got back to San Francisco, they decided to return to Summertown, Tennessee, where they bought 1,700 acres (688 hectares) and created an intentional community called "The Farm". The Farm became a respected, spiritually based hippie community that still thrives, although it is now more a hip village of 300 than a commune of 1,200. The Farm continues in public-service and philanthropic enterprises through the Farm Midwifery Center, Plenty International, and other sub-organizations.

Strawberry Fields

The second commune on the west coast

Started by former Boston stockbroker and later probation officer Gridley Wright, Strawberry Fields, named after the song by the Beatles, occupied forty four acres of land in Decker Canyon, in the arid hills above Malibu, California. Nine adults and six children made up the original community, housed in two old houses and a barn. Over fifty people ended up there during its five months of existence. It was a stopping off place for Timothy Leary as well as other well known figures in the psychedelic movement. Annie and the Family were one of the original families to take up residence there; they later went on to take part in the magical mystery tour and to live in a number of other communes in Europe.

== 1968 ==
By 1968, hippie-influenced fashions were beginning to take off in the mainstream, especially for youths and younger adults of the populous "Baby Boomer" generation, a number of whom may have aspired to emulate the hardcore movements now living in tribalistic communes, but had no overt connections to them. This was noticed not only in terms of clothes and also longer hair for men, but also in music, film, art, and literature, and not just in the US, but around the world. Eugene McCarthy's brief presidential campaign successfully persuaded a significant minority of young adults to "get clean for Gene" by shaving their beards or wearing lower miniskirts; however the "Clean Genes" had little impact on the popular image in the media spotlight, of the hirsute hippie adorned in beads, feathers, flowers and bells.

The year 1968 also saw the development of two new, but dissimilar, genres of music that each exerted some influence on, and were influenced by, the hippie movements: heavy metal, and reggae.

=== Yippies ===
The Yippies, who were seen as an offshoot of the hippie movements parodying as a political party, came to national attention during their celebration of the 1968 spring equinox, when some 3,000 of them took over Grand Central Station in New York – eventually resulting in 61 arrests. The Yippies, especially their leaders Abbie Hoffman and Jerry Rubin, became notorious for their theatrics, such as trying to levitate the Pentagon at the October 1967 war protest, and such slogans as "Rise up and abandon the creeping meatball!" Their stated intention to protest the 1968 Democratic National Convention in Chicago in August, including nominating their own candidate, "Lyndon Pigasus Pig" (an actual pig), was also widely publicized in the media at this time.

By the time of the convention, city officials were prepared for the worst, with 23,000 police, National Guard, and Federal troops. Following the pig's nomination on the first day, Rubin and 6 others were arrested, but protests and music concerts were allowed to continue in Lincoln Park for two days, albeit an 11:00 pm curfew was enforced. On the convention's second night, poet Allan Ginsberg led protesters out of the park, thus avoiding confrontation, by chanting "Om". On the third night, riots erupted in response to the curfew, causing police to indiscriminately attack protesters and innocent bystanders alike, including journalists from around the world and even visiting dignitaries, throughout the streets of Chicago. The violence suffered by the journalists present, even including Mike Wallace, Dan Rather and Hugh Hefner, resulted in a mainstream media that was more sympathetic to certain hippie ideals, and less so to politicians, for several years. However, this galvanized the protest movement, and the following year, the trial of Hoffman, Rubin, and others as the "Chicago Seven" (originally Eight) generated significant interest.

=== Resurrection City ===
Beginning May 12, 1968, the newly formed Poor People's Campaign, started by the recently (April 4) assassinated Martin Luther King Jr., organized a shantytown known as Resurrection City, composed of around 3,000 black, native, and Latino militants, along with a significant contingent of hippies and diggers, encamped on the National Mall in Washington, DC. This culminated in the June 19 "Solidarity Day" protest which drew 55,000 protesters, after which the tent settlements' population dwindled to around 300. It was finally razed, after almost 6 weeks, on June 24, 1968, by 1,000 riot police using tear gas.

== 1969 ==
=== People's Park ===
In April 1969, the building of People's Park in Berkeley, California received international attention. The University of California, Berkeley had demolished all the buildings on a 2.8-acre (1.1 ha) parcel near campus, intending to use the land to build playing fields and a parking lot. After a long delay, during which the site became a dangerous eyesore, thousands of ordinary Berkeley citizens, merchants, students, and hippies took matters into their own hands, planting trees, shrubs, flowers and grass to convert the land into a park. A major confrontation ensued on May 15, 1969, and Governor Ronald Reagan ordered a two-week occupation of the city of Berkeley by the United States National Guard. Flower power came into its own during this occupation as hippies engaged in acts of civil disobedience to plant flowers in empty lots all over Berkeley under the slogan "Let A Thousand Parks Bloom."

=== Woodstock ===
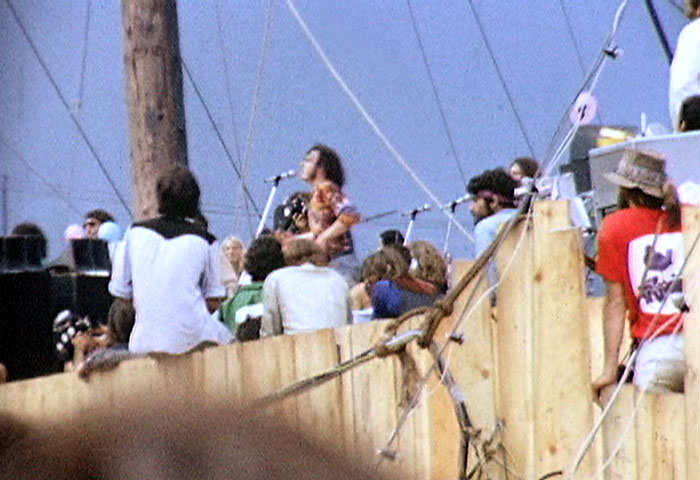
Joe Cocker at Woodstock 1969

In August 1969, the Woodstock Music and Art Festival took place in Bethel, New York, which for some, exemplified the best of hippie counterculture. Over 500,000 people arrived to hear the most notable musicians and bands of the era, among them Richie Havens, Joan Baez, Janis Joplin, The Grateful Dead, Creedence Clearwater Revival, Crosby, Stills, Nash & Young, Santana, The Who, Jefferson Airplane, and Jimi Hendrix. Wavy Gravy's Hog Farm provided security and attended to practical needs, and the hippie ideals of love and human fellowship seemed to have gained real-world expression.

=== Altamont ===
In December 1969, a similar event took place in Altamont, California, about 30 miles (45 km) east of San Francisco. Initially billed as "Woodstock West", its official name was The Altamont Free Concert. About 300,000 people gathered to hear The Rolling Stones; Crosby, Stills, Nash & Young; Jefferson Airplane and other bands. The Hells Angels provided security that proved far less beneficent than the security provided at the Woodstock event: 18-year-old Meredith Hunter was stabbed and killed while drawing a revolver in front of the stage during The Rolling Stones performance, and four accidental deaths occurred. There were also four births at the concert.

== 1970 to present ==
By 1970, the 1960s zeitgeist that had spawned hippie culture seemed to be on the wane, at least in the US. The events at Altamont shocked a number of Americans, including those who had strongly identified with hippie culture. Another shock came in the form of the Sharon Tate and Leno and Rosemary LaBianca murders committed in August 1969 by Charles Manson and his "family" of followers.

Nevertheless, the oppressive political atmosphere that featured the bombing of Cambodia and shootings by National Guardsmen at Jackson State University and Kent State University still brought people together. These shootings inspired the May 1970 songs by Quicksilver Messenger Service "What About Me?", where they sang "You keep adding to my numbers as you shoot my people down" and Crosby, Stills, Nash and Young's protest song "Ohio".

Meanwhile, in England, the Isle of Wight Festival 1970 (August) drew an even bigger attendance than Woodstock, and was a major gathering of the hippie movement (as well as one of the last major concert appearances for a few prominent musicians of the time, such as Jimi Hendrix).

Also in 1970, coverage of the Chicago Seven trials provided the mainstream media an opportunity to highlight the most radical aspects of the movement. Yippie leader Jerry Rubin's guest appearance on the Phil Donahue Show in that year (April 1) represents the virtual apex of such publicity – surpassed only by his appearance November 7 that same year on The David Frost Show, where he lit a joint and tried to pass it to Frost, then summoned an army of expletive-using hippies planted in the audience to swarm the stage, all on live television.

There was also a hippie commune founded in 1970, known as Tawapa. It was located near Placitas, New Mexico. However, it stopped existing in the 1990s due to the people not having legal rights to the land.

=== Charles Manson ===
Charles Manson was a lifelong criminal who had been released from prison just in time for San Francisco's Summer of Love. With his long hair, charisma and the ability to charm a crowd with his guitar playing, his singing and rhetoric, Manson exhibited a number of the outward manifestations of hippie identity. Yet he hardly exemplified the hippie ideals of peace, love, compassion and human fellowship; through twisted logic, hallucinogenic drugs, and psychological manipulation, he inspired his followers to commit murder. Manson's publicized 1970 trial and subsequent conviction in January 1971 tarnished the hippie image in the eyes of many Americans.

=== John Lennon ===
Also around this time, John Lennon of the Beatles and his wife Yoko Ono took up the mantle of a more prominent media role, as a force for continuing the 'humane revolution' that was politically opposed to the 'establishment'. As early as March 1969 the couple had conducted their first "Bed-In for Peace"; in August 1971 they moved to New York City and joined up with the Chicago Trial "Yippie" defendants and other notable activists. In December 1971, Lennon sang at the John Sinclair Freedom Rally in Michigan, calling attention to Sinclair's ten-year prison sentence for giving two joints to an undercover policewoman. Sinclair's release was suddenly approved by the state's authorities three days later, a testimony to the potential force of popular pressure; however, soon thereafter, the Nixon administration responded by seeking to have Lennon deported, on the pretext of a 1968 marijuana conviction in London. This dragged on through half of 1973, only increasing their status as anti-war and counterculture celebrities; by June 1973, the Watergate hearings had begun in earnest, and the famous pair made their final political statement by attending one of them. In 1975, the deportation case was dropped, and Lennon and Yoko attended the Inaugural Ball of president Jimmy Carter in January 1977.

=== Mainstream ===
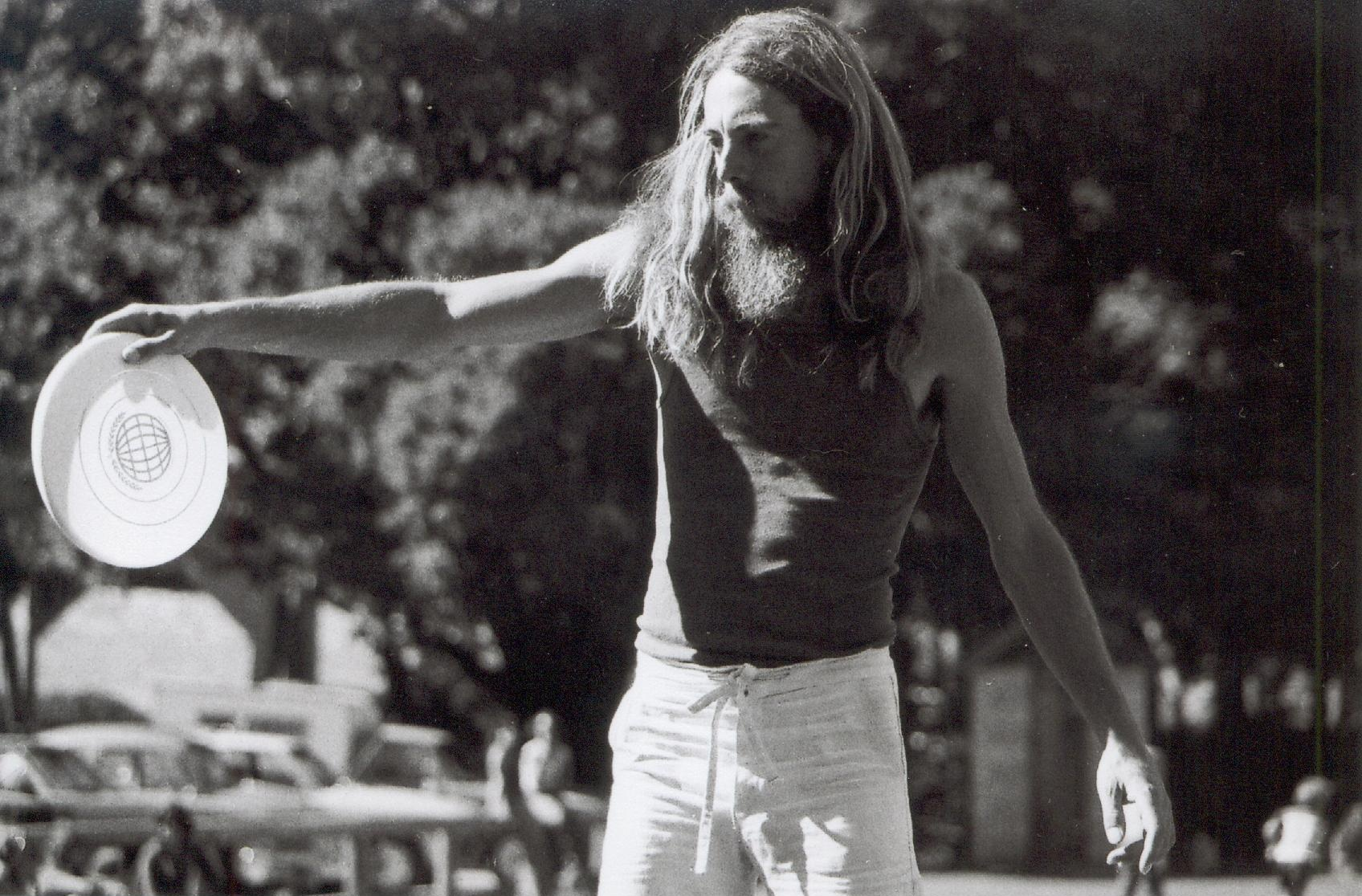
As a hippie Ken Westerfield helped to popularize Frisbee as an alternative sport in the 1960s and 1970s

Much of hippie style had been integrated into mainstream American society by the early 1970s. Large rock concerts that originated with the 1967 Monterey Pop Festival and the 1968 Isle of Wight Festival became the norm. Mustaches, beards, sideburns, and longer hair became mainstream, and colorful, multi-ethnic clothing dominated the fashion world.

Starting in the late 1960s, some working class skinheads have attacked hippies. Hippies were also vilified and sometimes attacked by punks, revivalist mods, greasers, football casuals, Teddy Boys and members of other American and European youth cultures in the 1970s and 1980s. Hippie ideals were a marked influence on anarcho-punk and some post-punk youth cultures, such as the Second Summer of Love.

In the mid-1970s, with the end of the draft and the Vietnam War, and a renewal of patriotic sentiment associated with the approach of the United States Bicentennial, the mainstream media lost interest in the hippie counterculture, and hippies became targets for ridicule, coinciding with the advent of punk rock and disco. Although not as visible as it once was, hippie culture has never died out completely: hippies and neo-hippies can still be found on college campuses, on communes and at festivals; while a number of them still embrace the hippie values of peace, love and community. Although a number of the original hippies and those who were core to the movement remained (or remain) dedicated to the values they originally espoused, a number of those who played more peripheral roles are often seen as having "sold out" during the 1980s by becoming a part of the corporate, materialist culture they initially rejected.

==== Mainstream popularity of psychedelic music ====
Psychedelic hard rock was the first of the psychedelic subgenres to reach the top of the U.S. Billboard Hot 100 songs in June 1966 with "Paint It Black" by the Rolling Stones. The Stones had previously had hard rock hits such as "(I Can't Get No) Satisfaction" (1965), and with "Paint It Black", they now combined hard rock with psychedelia. Other psychedelic rock No. 1 hits over the years were: 1967 – "Ruby Tuesday" (The Rolling Stones), "Light My Fire" (The Doors), "The Letter" (The Box Tops); 1968 – "Hello, I Love You" (The Doors), "People Got to Be Free" (The Rascals); 1969 – "Crimson and Clover" (Tommy James and the Shondells, psychedelic garage rock); 1970 – "Venus" (Shocking Blue).

For the next several years, as new psychedelic subgenres began to mushroom, combining with other styles, the charts saw multiple No. 1 hits reflecting their level of popularity with young music listeners. These subgenres included:

- Psychedelic folk – hit No. 1 in September 1966 with "Sunshine Superman" (Donovan). Other psychedelic folk No. 1 hits include: 1967 – "Happy Together" (The Turtles); 1968 – "Mrs. Robinson" (Simon & Garfunkel); 1969 – "In the Year 2525" (Zager and Evans); 1971 – "Gypsies, Tramps and Thieves" (Cher); 1972 – "American Pie" (Don McLean), "A Horse with No Name" (America).
- Psychedelic pop – hit No. 1 in September 1966 with "Cherish" (The Association). Other psychedelic pop No. 1 hits include: 1966 – "Good Vibrations" (The Beach Boys); 1967 – "Penny Lane" (The Beatles), "Windy" (The Association), "All You Need Is Love" (The Beatles), "To Sir With Love" (Lulu), "Incense and Peppermints" (Strawberry Alarm Clock), "Hello, Goodbye" (The Beatles); 1968 – "Hey, Jude" (The Beatles); 1969 – "Aquarius/Let the Sunshine In" (The 5th Dimension, psychedelic sunshine pop) 1971 – "Uncle Albert/Admiral Halsey" (Paul McCartney).
- Psychedelic soul – hit No. 1 in October 1966 with "Reach Out I'll Be There" (Four Tops). Other psychedelic soul No. 1 hits include: 1967 – "The Happening" (The Supremes); 1968 – "Love Child" (The Supremes); 1969 – "Everyday People" (Sly and the Family Stone), "I Can't Get Next to You" (The Temptations), "Wedding Bell Blues" (The 5th Dimension); 1970 – "War" (Edwin Starr); 1971 – "Just My Imagination" (The Temptations), "Family Affair" (Sly and the Family Stone); 1972 – "Lean on Me" (Bill Withers), "Papa Was a Rollin' Stone" (The Temptations); 1973 – "Killing Me Softly with His Song" (Roberta Flack).
- Psychedelic bubblegum pop – hit No. 1 in February 1968 with "Green Tambourine" (Lemon Pipers). Psychedelic bubblegum pop included No. 1 hits such as: 1969 – "Dizzy" (Tommy Roe). Bubblegum pop then became a genre in its own right, and drifted away from psychedelia with No. 1 hits by artists including The Archies, The Jackson 5, The Partridge Family, The Osmonds, and the Honey Cone.
- Psychedelic blues rock – hit No. 1 in November 1969 with "Come Together" (The Beatles). Other psychedelic blues No. 1 hits include: 1970 – "American Woman" (The Guess Who); 1971 – "Me and Bobby McGee" (Janis Joplin).
- Heavy psych – Bands like Iron Butterfly, Steppenwolf, Blue Cheer, Sir Lord Baltimore, Mount Rushmore, Morgen, Blue Öyster Cult, Yesterday's Children, Edgar Broughton Band, High Tide, Josefus, Captain Beyond, Frijid Pink, Third Power, Morly Grey, The Illusion, Attila, May Blitz, Pink Fairies, The Open Mind, Crow, The Litter, Toe Fat, Stack Waddy, Leaf Hound, Buffalo, Kahvas Jute, Flower Travellin' Band, Speed, Glue & Shinki, JPT Scare Band, Truth and Janey and also some early material by Grand Funk Railroad, Mountain, MC5 and The Stooges mixed psychedelic/acid blues rock with some heavier sounds between the late 1960s and early 1970s. Even if some of them have gained some mainstream attention, most of them were underground bands and they were re-discovered by collectionists and stoner rock fans.

Many genres that first appeared in the 1970s also incorporated psychedelic influences in the beginning, such as soft rock and disco, though they soon developed their own sounds that were distinct from psychedelic music.

=== Legacy ===
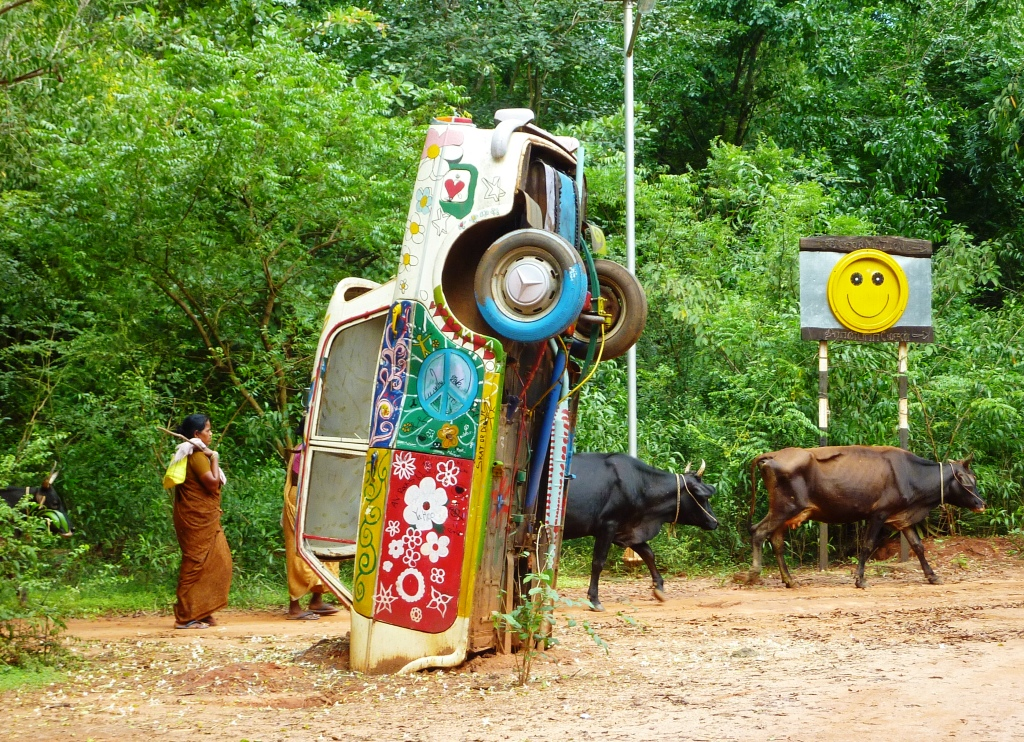
Monument to the hippie era, Tamil Nadu, India, 2010

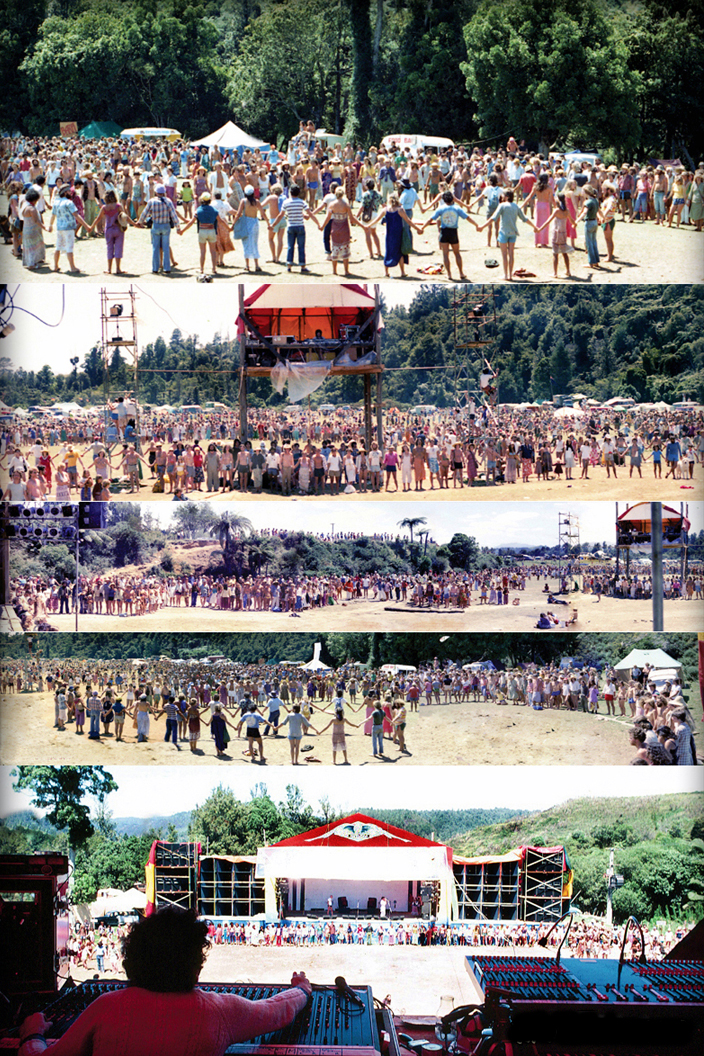
1981 – 10,000 Nambassa hippies join for world peace.

Since the 1960s, multiple aspects of the hippie counterculture have been assimilated by the mainstream.

Religious and cultural diversity has gained greater acceptance. Eastern religions and spiritual concepts, karma and reincarnation in particular, have reached a wider audience with around 20% of Americans espousing some New Age belief. A wide range of personal appearance options and clothing styles have become acceptable, all of which were uncommon before the hippie era. Co-operative business enterprises and creative community living arrangements are widely accepted. Interest in natural food, herbal remedies and vitamins is widespread, and the little hippie "health food stores" of the 1960s and 1970s are now large-scale, profitable businesses.

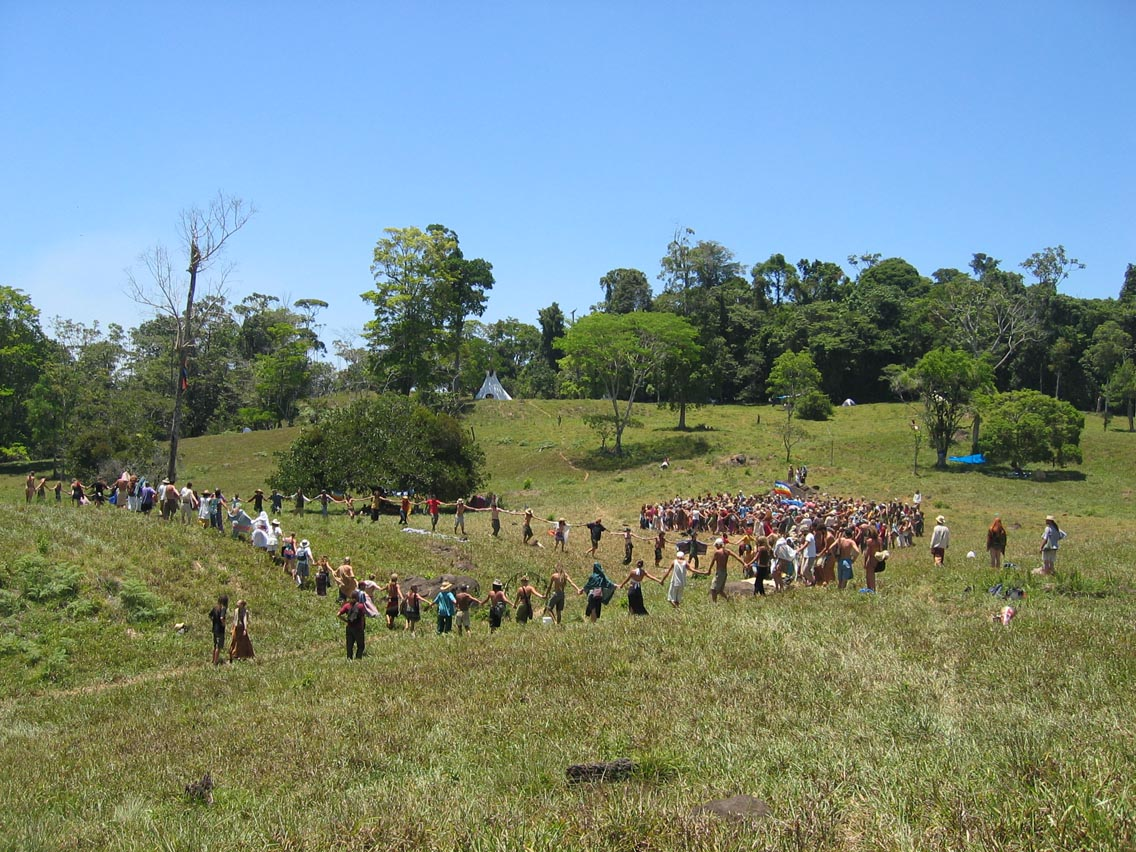
At the Rainbow World Gathering 2006 in Costa Rica

The immediate legacy of the hippies included: in fashion, the decline in popularity of the necktie which had been everyday wear during the 1950s and early 1960s, and generally longer hairstyles, even for politicians such as Pierre Trudeau; in literature, books like The Electric Kool-Aid Acid Test; in music, the blending of folk rock into newer forms including acid rock and heavy metal; in television and film, far greater visibility and influence, with some films depicting the hippie ethos and lifestyle, such as Woodstock, Easy Rider, Hair, The Doors, and Crumb. Hippies were frequently parodied on popular television series of the time like Star Trek, while shows like Dragnet regularly portrayed them in a negative light as drug-crazed hedonists. Even children's television shows like H.R. Pufnstuf, and educational shows such as The Electric Company and Mulligan Stew were influenced by the hippies.

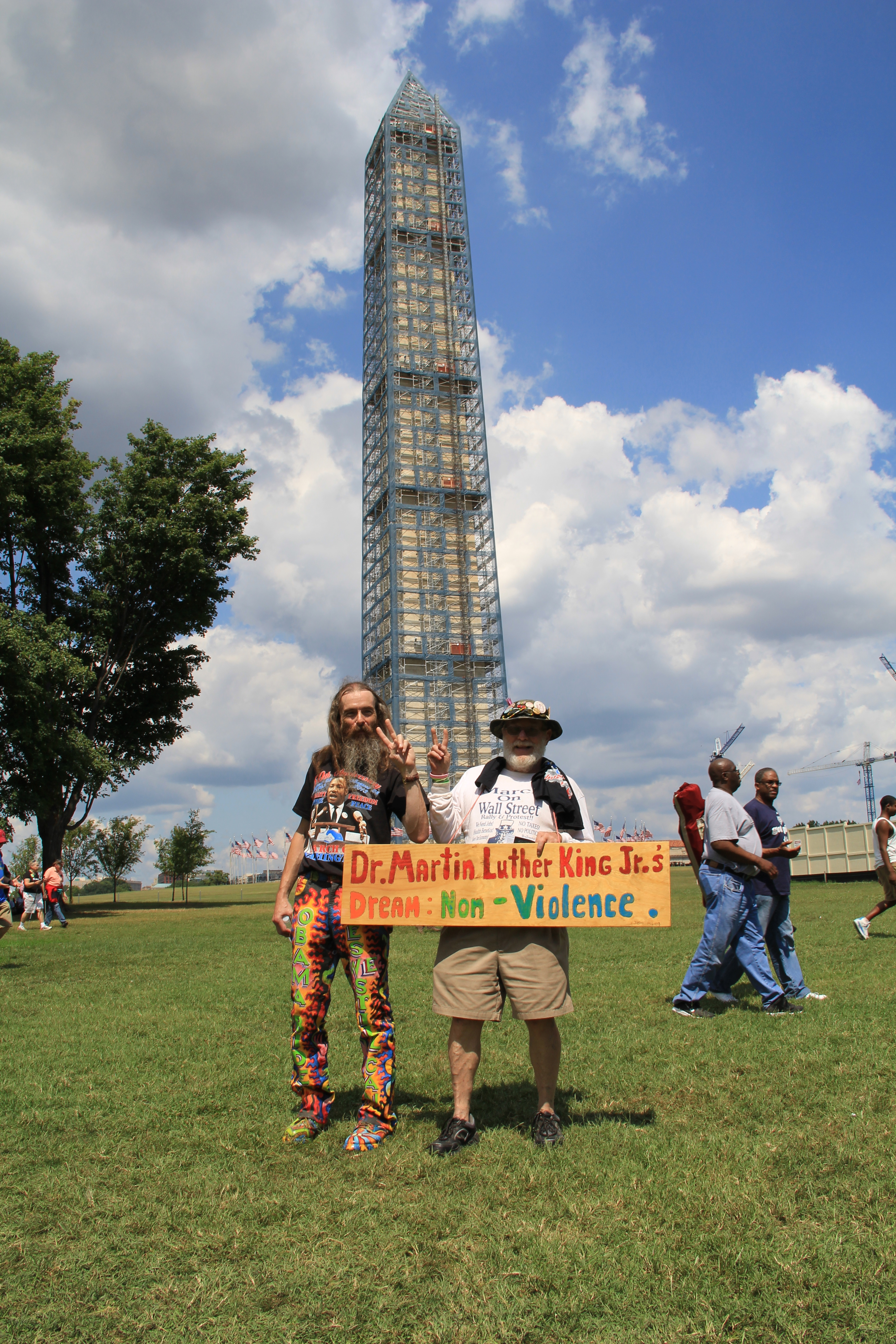
Old hippies celebrating the 50th anniversary of the March on Washington for Jobs and Freedom, 2013

While a number of hippies made a long-term commitment to the lifestyle, some younger people argue that hippies "sold out" during the 1980s and became part of the materialist, consumer culture.

Hippies who did not "sell out" have been featured in the press as recently as April 2014. Forty years after founding the "Hippie Kitchen" in Los Angeles' Skid Row in the back of a van, Catholic Workers Jeff Dietrich, a draft resister, and Catherine Morris, a former nun, remained active in their work feeding Skid Row residents and protesting wars, especially in front of the local Federal Building.

Hippies may still be found in bohemian enclaves around the world.

Contemporary hippies have made use of the World Wide Web and can be found on virtual communities. In the United Kingdom, the New Age travellers movement, while eschewing the label 'hippie', nevertheless revived multiple hippie traditions into the 1980s and 1990s. Current events, festivals and parties continue to promote the hippie lifestyle and values. The "boho-chic" fashion style of 2003–2007 had a number of hippie features and the London Evening Standard even used the term "hippie chic" (March 11, 2005).

=== Neo-hippies ===
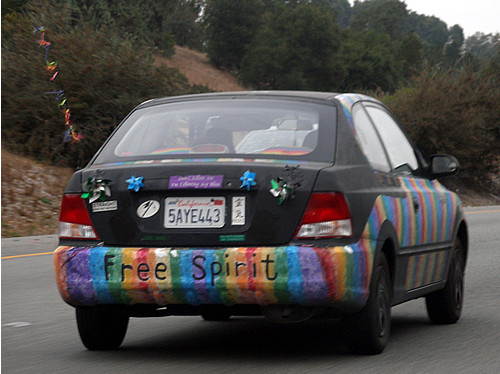
Art car seen in Northern California

Neo-hippies, some of whom are children and grandchildren of the original hippies, advocate a number of the same beliefs of their 1960s counterparts. Drug use is just as accepted as in the "original" hippie days, although some neo-hippies do not consider it necessary to take drugs to be part of the lifestyle, and others reject drug use in favor of alternative methods of reaching higher or altered consciousness such as drumming circles, community singing, meditation, yoga and dance. On April 20 (4/20) a number of neo-hippies gather at "Hippie Hill" in Golden Gate Park, San Francisco.

In the United States, some hippies refer to themselves as "Rainbows", a name derived from their tie-dyed T-shirts, and for some, from their participation in the hippie group, "Rainbow Family of Living Light". Since the early 1970s, the Rainbows meet informally at Rainbow Gatherings on U.S. National Forest Land as well as internationally. "Peace, love, harmony, freedom, and community" is their motto.

=== Festivals ===
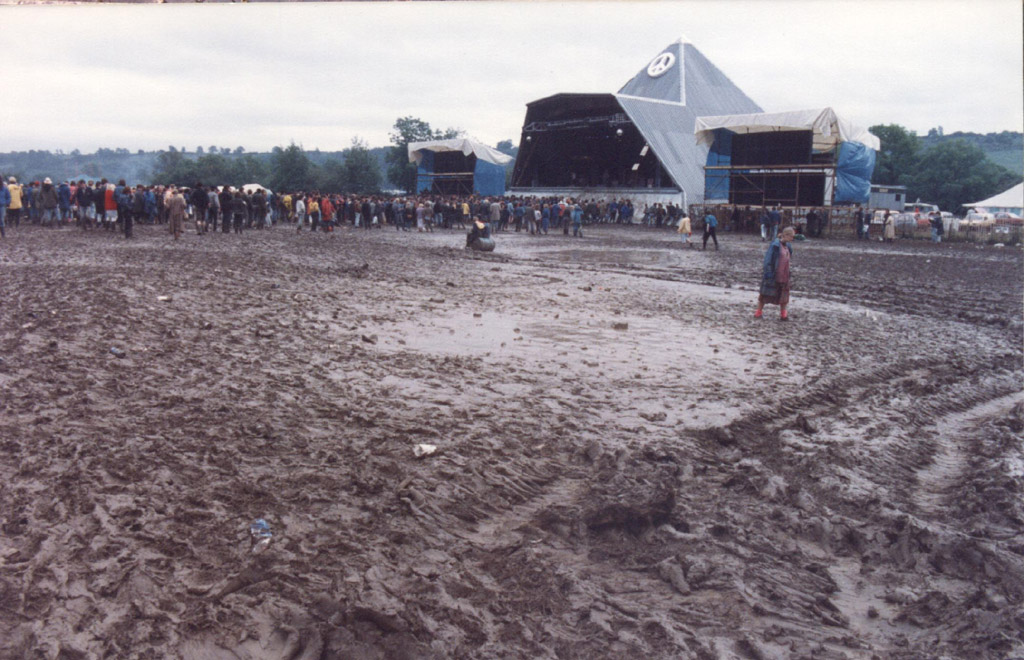
Glastonbury Festival in 1985

The tradition of hippie festivals began in the United States in 1965 with Ken Kesey's Acid Tests, where the Grateful Dead played under the influence of LSD and initiated psychedelic jamming. For the next several decades, a number of hippies and neo-hippies became part of the Deadhead and Phish Head communities, attending music and art festivals held around the country. The Grateful Dead toured continuously, with few interruptions between 1965 and 1995. Phish toured sporadically between 1983 and 2004. With the demise of the Grateful Dead and Phish, the nomadic touring hippies have been left without a main jam band to follow. Instead, they attend a growing series of summer festivals, the largest of which is called the Bonnaroo Music & Arts Festival, which premiered in 2002.

The Oregon Country Fair began in 1969 as a benefit for an alternative school. Currently, the three-day festival features handmade crafts, educational displays and costumed entertainment in a wooded setting near Veneta, Oregon, just west of Eugene. Each year the festival becomes the third largest city in Lane County.

The annual Starwood Festival, founded in 1981, is a six-day event held in Pomeroy, Ohio indicative of the spiritual quest of hippies through an exploration of non-mainstream religions and world-views. It has offered performances and classes by a variety of hippie and counter-culture icons, from musical guests like Big Brother and the Holding Company, Merl Saunders and Babatunde Olatunji to speakers such as Timothy Leary, Terence McKenna, Paul Krassner, Stephen Gaskin, Robert Anton Wilson, Harvey Wasserman and Ralph Metzner.

The Burning Man festival began in 1986 at a San Francisco beach party. Now an annual gathering, the event is held in the Black Rock Desert northeast of Reno, Nevada. Though few participants would accept the "hippie" label, Burning Man is a contemporary expression of alternative community in the same spirit as early hippie events. The gathering becomes a temporary city (36,500 occupants in 2005), with elaborate encampments, displays and multiple art cars.

Held annually in Manchester, Tennessee, the Bonnaroo Music and Arts Festival has become a tradition for music fans, since its sold-out premiere in 2002. Approximately 70–80,000 attend Bonnaroo yearly. The festival producers have made investments in their property, constructing vast telecommunications networks, potable water supplies, sanitation facilities, and safety features such as first aid shelters for every 200–300 fans.

The 10,000 Lakes Festival is an annual three-day music festival in Detroit Lakes, Minnesota. Also referred to as '10KLF' (K for thousand, LF for Lakes Festival), the festival began in 2003. Attendance in 2006 was around 18,000.

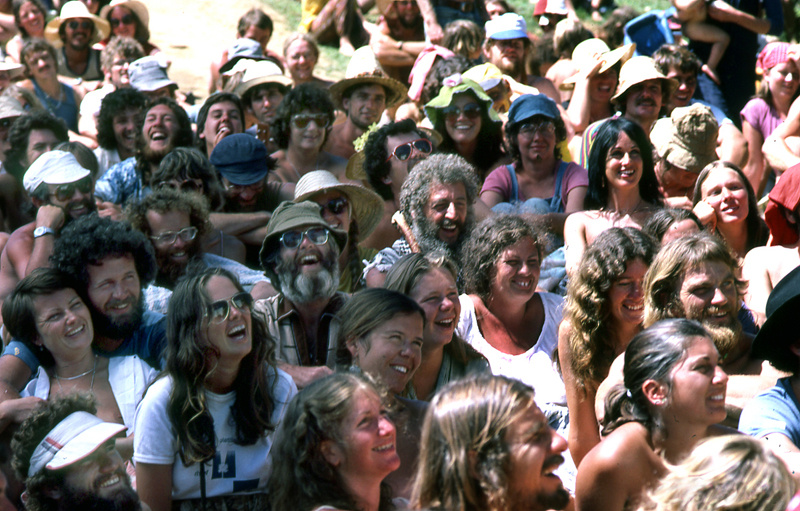
Hippies at the Nambassa 1981 Festival New Zealand

In the UK, there are a number of new age travellers who are known as hippies to outsiders, but prefer to call themselves the Peace Convoy. They started the Stonehenge Free Festival in 1974, especially Wally Hope, until the English Heritage legally banned the festival, resulting in the Battle of the Beanfield in 1985. With Stonehenge banned as a festival site new age travellers gather at the annual Glastonbury Festival to see hundreds of live dance, comedy, theatre, circus, cabaret and other performances. Others argue that it has now become too much of a commercial event, and instead opt for smaller festivals such as Beautiful Days, Sunrise Celebration, or the Big Green Gathering. In 2005, Glastonbury festival covered 900 acres (3.6 km^{2}) and attracted 150,000 people.

In Australia, the hippie movement began to emerge in the mid to late 60's with the subculture being showcased at the Pilgrimage for Pop Festival held in Ourimbah, New South Wales on January 24 and 25, 1970.| The scene continued to evolve through the Aquarius Festival held in 1971 in Canberra and again in Nimbin two years later. A number of festival goers stayed in Nimbin, transforming the town and local area. It also resulted in the formation of one of Australia's largest and most successful communes.

Between 1976 and 1981, hippie music festivals were held on large farms around Waihi and Waikino in New Zealand- Aotearoa. Named Nambassa, the festivals focused on peace, love, and a balanced lifestyle, featuring workshops and displays advocating alternative lifestyles, clean and sustainable energy, and unadulterated foods. Nambassa is also the tribal name of a trust that has championed sustainable ideas and demonstrated practical counterculture and alternative lifestyle methods since the early 1970s.

Many of the bands performing at hippie festivals, and their derivatives, are called jam bands, since they play songs that contain long instrumentals similar to the original hippie bands of the 1960s. Psychedelic trance or "psytrance", a type of techno music influenced by 1960s psychedelic rock and hippie culture is also popular among neo-hippies worldwide. Psytrance hippies usually attend separate festivals where only electronic music is played.

== See also ==
- Counterculture of the 1960s
- Hippie trail
- Indomania
- Psychedelic music
- Psychedelic rock
- Raga rock
- Timeline of 1960s counterculture
- List of intentional communities
