= Douglas Stevenson =

American author

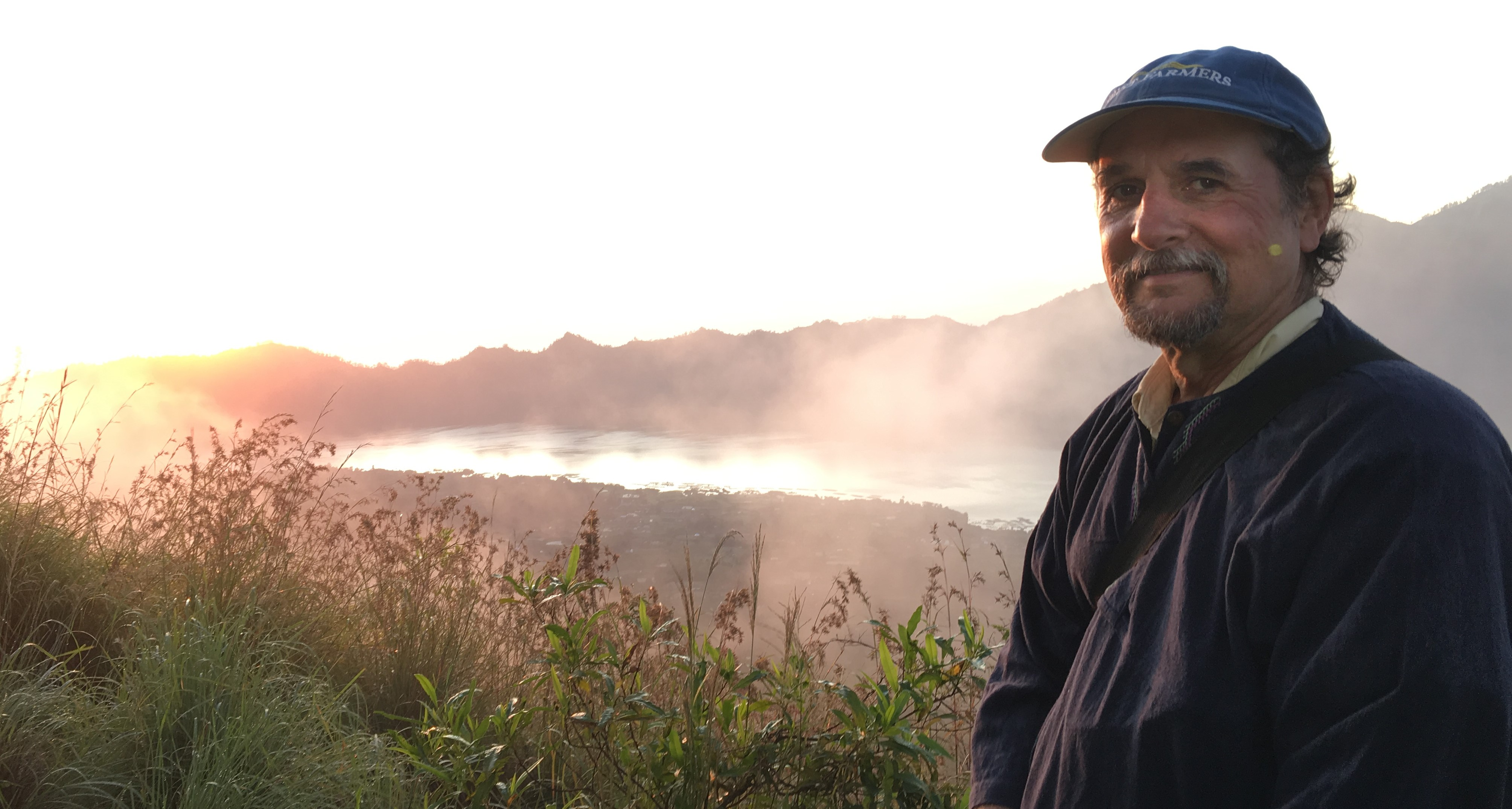
- Douglas Stevenson, Bali, 2016
- Born: November 5, 1953; Louisville, Kentucky, U.S.
- Occupations: Activist, speaker, musician, writer
- Spouse: Deborah Kay Flowers (m.1972)
- Children: Jody Stevenson, Leah Thomas
- Website: www.douglasstevenson.com

Douglas O. Stevenson (November 5, 1953) is an American author, activist, and principal media spokesperson for "The Farm", a spiritual community, once the world's largest hippy commune, and one of the better-known ecovillage experiments in North America in the early 1970s. His interviews have appeared in a variety of media outlets, including newspapers, magazines, documentaries, and television news programs such as Now in America, CNN's American Journey, and United Shades of America.

== Life and work ==
Stevenson has been a member of The Farm Community since 1973 and has served as a board member and manager. He has also been actively involved in disaster relief and international development work. In 1978–1980, he volunteered with Plenty International in Guatemala after an earthquake, and in 2000, he volunteered with the same organization in Belize, working on projects related to Mayan-based ecotourism and women's health. He was part of the organization when it was awarded the first Right Livelihood Award in 1980.

Stevenson is a lifelong musician and leads group singing, chanting, and dancing in his later years, particularly the Dances of Universal Peace. He has authored three books, the latter two on the history of The Farm, including "Out to Change the World: The Evolution of The Farm Community" and "The Farm Then and Now: A Model for Sustainable Living." He was an associate producer of "Forty Years of The Farm," a feature-length documentary. In addition, he has written over 1000 articles that have appeared in various national and international journals and magazines.

Stevenson is the president of Village Media, a multimedia communications company he founded in 1981. He was also a founding member of the nonprofit PeaceRoots Alliance in 2002 and served as a board member of the Swan Conservation Trust from 2002 to 2014, a nonprofit land trust that established the 1400-acre Big Swan Headwaters Preserve, part of the TennGreen Land Conservancy.

== Bibliography ==
In order of first publication date.

- Stevenson, Douglas (2013). Creating PC Video 1st Edition (nonfiction). USA: Taylor & Francis. ISBN 978-0240803616.
- — (2014). Out to Change the World: The Evolution of The Farm Community. Summertown, TN, USA: Book Publishing Company. ASIN B00KRPZN2I.
- — (2014). The Farm Then and Now: A Model for Sustainable Living. Gabriola Is. B.C. Canada: New Society Publishers. ASIN B00J1JQ3N4.

== See also ==
- Alternative lifestyle
- Counterculture
- Counterculture of the 1960s
- Stephen Gaskin
