= The Farm Vegetarian Cookbook =

1975 vegan cookbook by Louise Hagler

- First edition
- Author: Louise Hagler
- Publisher: Book Publishing Company
- Publication date: 1975
- ISBN: 0913990604 current edition
- Followed by: The New Farm Vegetarian Cookbook

The Farm Vegetarian Cookbook (later The New Farm Vegetarian Cookbook) is a vegan cookbook by Louise Hagler, first published in 1975. It was influential in introducing Americans to tofu, included recipes for making and using tempeh and other soy foods, and became a staple in vegetarian kitchens.

== History ==
The Farm is an intentional community founded in 1971 in Lewis County, Tennessee. Their diet is vegan, which at the time was uncommon in the United States. UNICEF, seeing an opportunity to examine a large group all eating the same diet, sent nutritionists to the community. When the UNICEF experts checked the members' nutritional intake, they found it provided adequate protein but fell short in providing carbohydrates, fats, and calories. Recipes were developed to provide community members with guidance in following the experts' advice, and then collected to become the cookbook.

The Farm Vegetarian Cookbook was first published in 1975 by Book Publishing Company, the publishing arm of The Farm, and was a commercial success for the community. In 1978 a revised edition titled The New Farm Vegetarian Cookbook was published. In 1982 it was translated into German and published under the title Soja Total. According to its publisher it was the first completely vegan cookbook published in the United States.

Louise Hagler wrote several books on soy foods. She became a vegetarian in 1969.

== Contents ==
The book emphasizes soy products such as soymilk, tofu, and tempeh, and gives guidelines for making them from scratch. Douglas Stevenson in The Farm Then and Now said it was one of the first cookbooks to provide "easy-to-follow, good-tasting" vegan recipes. The Farm leader Stephen Gaskin wrote in the introduction that the cookbook was not intended to be "cultish, faddish, or scare people off" but instead to educate readers and inform them that a vegetarian diet is based heavily on beans.

== Impact ==
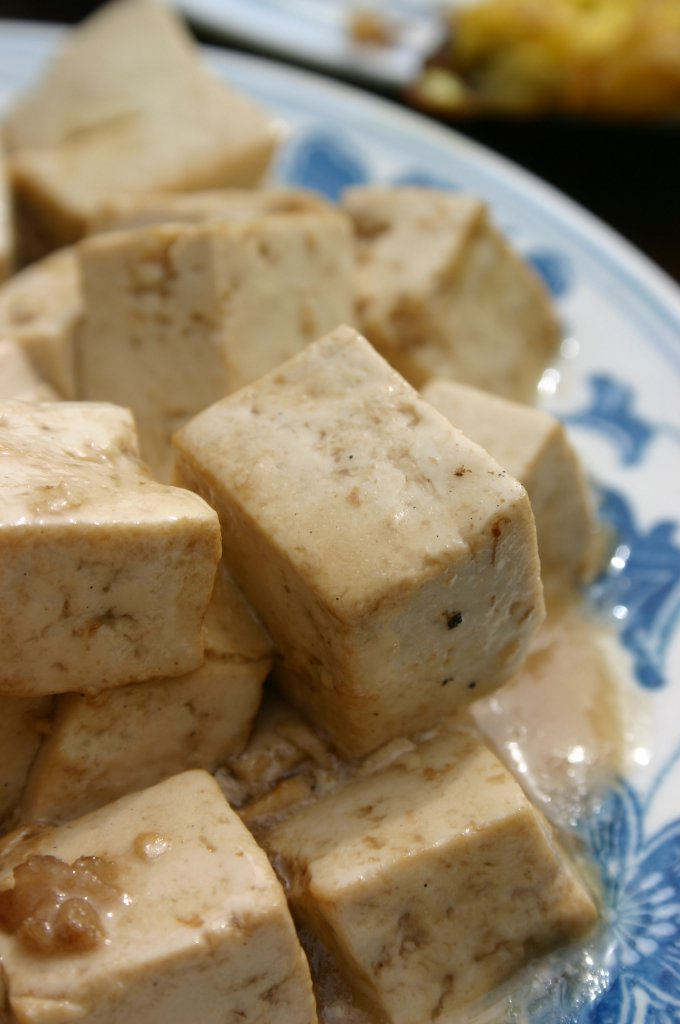
Cooked tofu

Academic Matthew Roth in Magic Bean:The Rise of Soy in America called it a staple in vegetarian kitchens. William Shurtleff and Akiko Aoyagi said the book played an important role in introducing soy foods and a vegan diet to Americans, made a major contribution to "westernizing recipes previously Oriental in origin", and encouraged vegetarianism not only as a diet but as a lifestyle. Vegetarian Times said it pioneered vegan nutrition and introduced America to cooking with tofu. Vegetarian historians Karen and Michael Iacobbo said it was instrumental in introducing Americans to tofu, tempeh, and textured vegetable protein in the 1970s.

== Reputation ==
In 1990 Vegetarian Times called it a staple in vegetarian kitchens and in 1994 named it one of the five best vegan cookbooks.

Food historians William Shurtleff and Akiko Aoyagi called it pioneering and influential.

The Vegetarian Journal called it a "famous" cheese-alternative cookbook, noting its recipe for Macaroni and "Cheese" Casserole, which uses nutritional yeast as a cheese substitute.

The Fellowship for Intentional Community called it a classic.
