= Albert Bates =

American lawyer

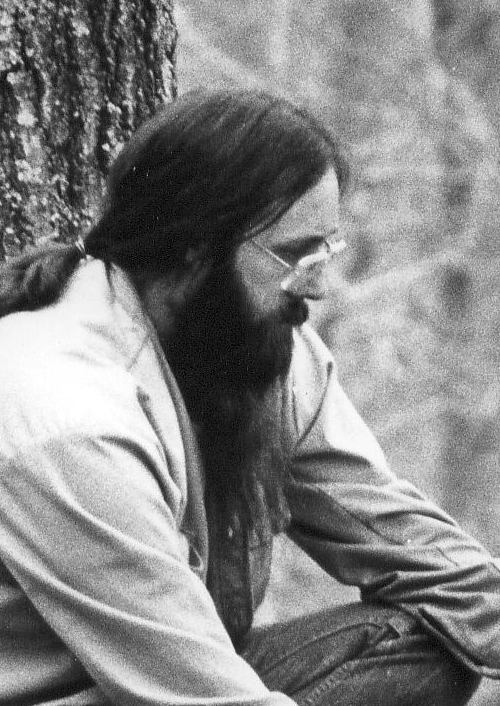
Albert Keliinui Bates in 1981

Albert Keliinui Bates (born January 1, 1947) is a member of the intentional community and ecovillage movements. A lawyer, author and teacher, he has been director of the Global Village Institute for Appropriate Technology since 1984 and of the Ecovillage Training Center at The Farm in Summertown, Tennessee, since 1994.

Bates has been a resident of The Farm since 1972. A former attorney, he argued environmental and civil rights cases before the U.S. Supreme Court and drafted a number of legislative Acts during a 26-year legal career. The holder of a number of design patents, Bates invented the concentrating photovoltaic arrays and solar-powered automobile displayed at the 1982 World's Fair. He served on the steering committee of Plenty International for 18 years, focussing on relief and development work with indigenous peoples, human rights and the environment. An emergency medical technician (EMT), he was a founding member of The Farm Ambulance Service. He was also a licensed Amateur Radio operator.

== Life and work ==
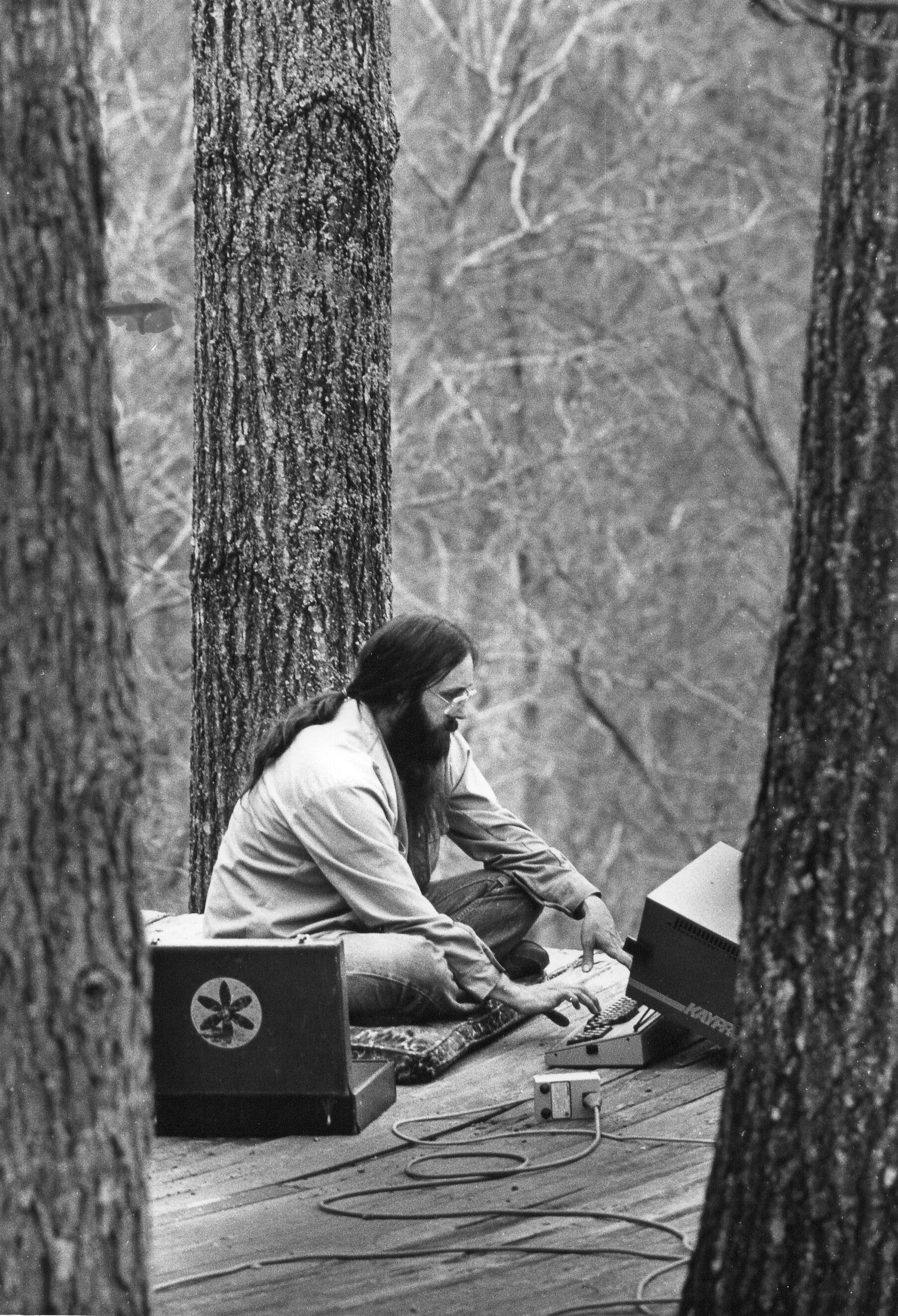
Albert K. Bates works on a Kaypro-10 computer from his home at The Farm in Summertown, Tennessee, in 1981.

Bates first came to national prominence in 1978 when he sued to shut down the entire U.S. nuclear fuel cycle from mines to waste repositories. The case, which went four times to the United States Supreme Court and was later profiled in a law review article and two books, was ultimately unsuccessful but raised troubling questions about the health effects of nuclear energy and the ethical dimensions — and civil liberties implications — of the federal role in promoting power deployment while actively suppressing and concealing public health effects.

Bates has played a major role in the ecovillage movement as one of the organizers of the Global Ecovillage Network (GEN), and served as GEN's chairman of the board (from 2002 to 2003) and president (from 2003 to 2004). He was also the principal organizer of the Ecovillage Network of the Americas and served as its president (from 1996 to 2003). In 1994 he founded the Ecovillage Training Center, a "whole systems immersion experience of ecovillage living." He has taught courses in sustainable design, natural building, permaculture and technologies of the future to students from more than 50 nations.

Bates's Climate in Crisis (1990) was the first book published on web (rolled paper) press using a 100% recycled product without chemically removing clays or inks. Since then, he has been planting a private forest to sequester carbon dioxide and related greenhouse gas emissions from travel, business and personal activities. At 40 acres under mixed-age, mixed-species, climate-resilient management, primarily being managed for ecosystem services, that forest now annually plants itself as it expands.

== Awards ==
In 1980, Bates shared in the first Right Livelihood Award as part of the executive board of Plenty International. In 2012, he received the Gaia Award from Gaia Trust of Denmark for his efforts in fostering the ecovillage movement. He was named 2024 EcoHero of the Year by a California Permaculture group.

== Published works ==
Bates is author of many books on law, energy, history and environment, including:

- The Grass Case (1973) with William Meyers, Matthew McClure, Peter Schweitzer, and Joel Kachinsky,
- Honicker v. Hendrie: A Lawsuit to End Atomic Power (1974),
- Shutdown: Nuclear Power on Trial (1979) with John Gofman and Ernest Sternglass,
- Your Rights to Victims Compensation (1980),
- Climate in Crisis (1990),
- Voices from The Farm (1998) with Rupert Fike,
- The Y2K Survival Guide and Cookbook (1999) with Dorothy R. Bates,
- The Post-Petroleum Survival Guide and Cookbook (2006),
- The Biochar Solution (2010),
- Fermaculture (2011) with Sandor Katz,
- The Paris Agreement (2015),
- Pour Evian on Your Radishes (2015),
- The Financial Collapse Survival Guide and Cookbook (2015),
- Burn: Using Fire to Cool the Earth (2019) with Kathleen Draper,
- Transforming Plastic: From Pollution to Evolution (2019),
- A Side Door Introduction to The Farm (2019),
- Taming Plastic (2019),
- Dark Side of the Ocean (2020),
- Plagued: Surviving A Modern Pandemic (2020),
- Making Waves (2021),
- Cool Down (2021) with Kathleen Draper,
- Retropulationism (2024).

The Post-petroleum Survival Guide and Cookbook: Recipes for Changing Times, was published in 2006. In it Bates examines the transition from a society based on abundant cheap petroleum to one of "compelled conservation." The book looks at the ways of preparing for this transition. He regards the coming change as an opportunity to "redeem our essential interconnectedness with nature and with each other."

In his introduction, Bates outlines the realities of declining fossil energy and global climate change. He puts forward a "twelve step petrochemical addiction recovery program," from post-growth economics through methods to conserve fresh water, manage wastes, generate energy, produce and store food, and travel without the aid of fossil fuels. As a review by Ryan McGreal states: "The central message in this book is sustainability and permaculture. A recurring theme is that every waste product is something else's food, and that the most sustainable arrangement works with the prevailing conditions, not against them." McGreal summarizes Bates's proposals for human adaptation as follows:

Instead of wasting energy trying to fight nature, it makes more sense to understand nature and use it to your mutual benefit. This, of course, means the end of one-size-fits-all industrial solutions and a return to decentralized, idiosyncratic plans based on local conditions.

The Biochar Solution: Carbon farming and Climate Change, was published in 2010. In it Bates traces the evolution of carbon-enriching agriculture from the ancient black soils of the Amazon to its reappearance as a modern climate restoration strategy.

In The Biochar Solution, Bates repeats the urgency of declining fossil energy, especially in the context of chemical and energy-intensive progressive agriculture and global climate change. He proposes a carbon-oriented agricultural revolution that could double world food supplies while simultaneously building soil fertility and lowering atmospheric and oceanic concentrations of carbon. Bates suggests that, if sourced cautiously, biochar energy systems could eliminate fossil fuel dependency, bring new life to desertified landscapes, purify drinking water, and build carbon-negative homes, communities and economies. Peter Bane, the editor of Permaculture Activist, describes Bates's talents in this way:

If there is a smart, multi-functional, low-cost, democratic strategy that can help to pull carbon out of the atmosphere, it's probably in this book: chinampas, step-harvest planting of trees (with six times the carbon density per acre), harnessing youth to the task, agroforestry, greening the desert, uneven-aged forest management, carbon farming, the soil food web, and more. Each of these gets a relatively brief, punchy, and fairly technical description. Bates is a good and stylish writer; he has an ear for the pithy phrase, and reading him is generally a pleasure. This book, based on original scholarship, vast knowledge of a rapidly changing global field, and the arcana of many loosely linked disciplines brings the skills and interests of its polymath author together for a supremely important purpose.

Bates's The Paris Agreement: the best chance we have to save the one planet we've got was published just weeks after the close of COP-21, the United Nations Conference on Climate Change in December 2015. The book follows Bates's year-long travels leading up to the Paris conference, the delicate and often fractious negotiations, and dissects the final document agreed to by 196 countries. It includes anecdotes from a range of surroundings, from inside the halls of Le Bourget to boating the Seine with indigenous peoples there to protest the talks.

In 2019, no fewer than four books by Bates were published by various publishers. In Burn: Using Fire to Cool the Earth, Bates says we need to radically alter how humans live on Earth. In 2020, Chelsea Green brought out a paper edition as Burn: Igniting a New Carbon Drawdown Economy to End the Climate Crisis.

We have to go from spending carbon to banking it. We have to put back the trees, wetlands, and corals. We have to regrow the soil and turn back the desert. We have to save whales, wombats, and wolves. We have to reverse the flow of greenhouse gases and send them in exactly the opposite direction: down, not up. We have to flip the carbon cycle and run it backward. For such a revolutionary transformation we’ll need civilization 2.0.

Burn argues that renewable biomass and carbon capture are insufficient responses to climate change, and instead proposes a circular economy model in which energy and natural resources are continuously recycled and improved to reduce the risk of human extinction.

Transforming Plastic, and a school edition, Taming Plastic, Bates addresses the magnitude and consequences of another global problem. Bates emphasizes that the only way to stem the present onslaught of a material that endures forever is to enforce mandatory economic and industrial changes so that recycled, biosourced, and biodegradable plastic become more cost-effective than plastic made from fossil fuels. He explores current worldwide efforts for stronger regulations and better waste management, along with exciting new biological and man-made technologies for improved plastics collection and disposal.

In A Side Door Introduction to The Farm, Bates brings together the observations of authors, reporters and casual observers over the first 50 years of his ecovillage's history, some positive but many critical. This short anthology contains insights into the mechanics of crafting a holistic, utopian vision and then trying to bring it into the world. It explains why the Farm has continued to thrive, now into four generations, after half a century of experimentation.

Since 2006, Bates has published a weekly blog called The Great Change, which appears Sundays and is occasionally syndicated to other sites.

== See also ==
- Appropriate Technology
- Ecovillage

== Sources ==
- Medlicott, Carol (2013). Issachar Bates: A Shaker's Journey. University Press of New England. ISBN 978-1611684346.
- 700 years of Bates Family History.
