= Joanne Stepaniak =

American writer

Joanne M. Stepaniak
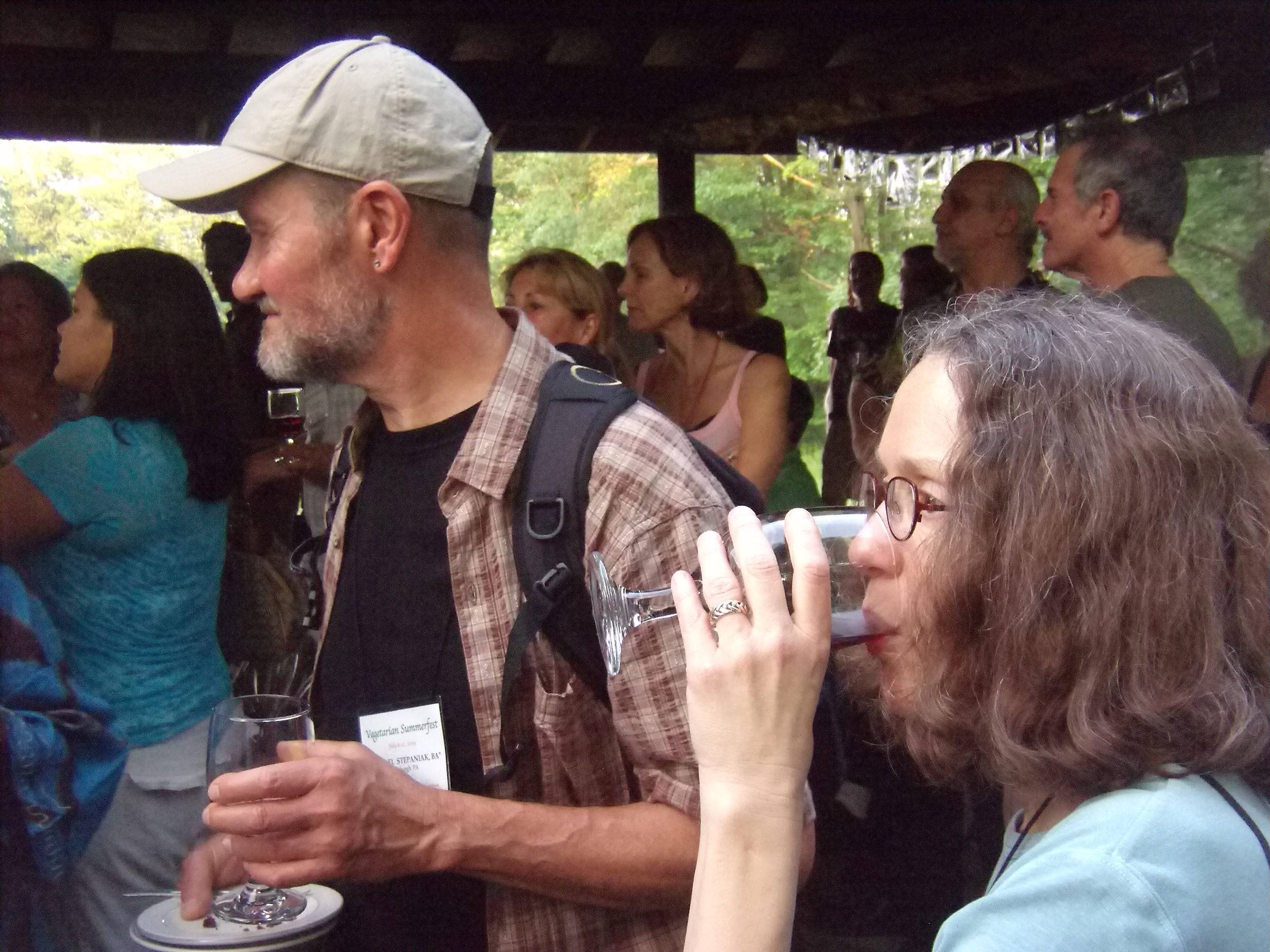
- Michael and Joanne Stepaniak at Vegan Wedding at NAVS Summerfest in Johnstown PA
- Born: Joanne M. Abrams; January 7, 1954 (age 72)
- Occupations: Nutritionist, Author, Editor
- Spouse: Michael Stepaniak
- Relatives: Dr. Peggy L. Abrams, Nancy Aronson
- Writing career
- Genre: Non-fiction
- Subject: Food
- Notable awards: Vegetarian Hall of Fame (June 2008)
- Literary movement: Vegan, Vegetarian

Joanne "Jo" M. Stepaniak (born January 7, 1954) is an American writer specializing in veganism and nutrition. She is the author of several books on the subject, including The Vegan Sourcebook (1998).

== Life ==
Stepaniak's parents were Edna Abrams Greenberg and Herbert S. Abrams of Pennsylvania and has two sisters. She became a vegetarian as a child. After her marriage she became a vegan for ethical reasons. She describes herself as a "kale-aholic" as she enjoys eating kale and collard greens. For over 31 years she has been Supervising Editor at Book Publishing Company in Summertown, Tennessee.

She was elected to the Vegetarian Hall of Fame in June 2008 in Johnstown, Pennsylvania, at the 34th Annual Vegetarian Summerfest of the North American Vegetarian Society.

Stepaniak and her husband Michael live in Pittsburgh, Pennsylvania.

== Selected publications ==
- Vegan Vittles: Recipes Inspired by the Critters of Farm Sanctuary, Book Publishing Company, 1996 (ISBN 1570670250)
- The Vegan Sourcebook, Lowell House, November 1998 (ISBN 1-56565-880-9). Second edition: McGraw-Hill, October 1, 2000 (ISBN 0-7373-0506-1)
- The Saucy Vegetarian: Quick & Healthful No-Cook Sauces & Dressings, Book Publishing Company, January 2000 (ISBN 1570670919)
- Being Vegan: Living with Conscience, Conviction, and Compassion, Lowell House, 2000 (ISBN 0-7373-0323-9)
- Vegan Deli: Wholesome Ethnic Fast Food, Book Publishing Company, 2001 (ISBN 1-57067-109-5)
- Raising Vegetarian Children, McGraw-Hill, September 25, 2002 (ISBN 0658021559)
- The Ultimate Uncheese Cookbook: Delicious Dairy-Free Cheeses and Classic "Uncheese" Dishes, Book Publishing Company, 10 Anv edition, December 2003 (ISBN 1570671516)
- Food Allergy Survival Guide: Surviving and Thriving With Food Allergies and Sensitivities, Healthy Living Publications. August 2004 (ISBN 157067163X)
