= Birth Story: Ina May Gaskin and the Farm Midwives =

- Directed by: Sara Lamm; Mary Wigmore
- Produced by: Sara Lamm; Mary Wigmore; Kate Roughan; Zachary Mortensen
- Starring: Ina May Gaskin
- Edited by: Kate Amend
- Music by: Robin Pecknold
- Production company: Ghost Robot/Reckon So Productions
- Release dates: June 16, 2012 (Los Angeles Film Festival); January 16, 2013
- Running time: 93 minutes
- Country: United States
- Language: English

Birth Story: Ina May Gaskin and the Farm Midwives is a 2012 documentary film about midwife Ina May Gaskin of The Farm in Tennessee, directed by Sara Lamm and Mary Wigmore.
