= Stillhouse Hollow Falls State Natural Area =

Protected area of Tennessee, United States

Coordinates: 35°27′52″N 87°16′11″W

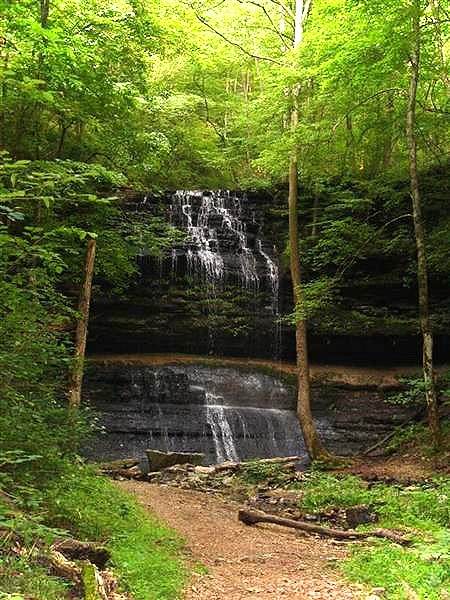
- Interactive map of Stillhouse Hollow Falls State Natural Area
- Type: Tennessee State Natural Area
- Location: Summertown, Tennessee
- Area: 90 acres (360,000 m^{2})
- Created: 2006
- Operator: Tennessee Department of Environment and Conservation

Stillhouse Hollow Falls State Natural Area, located in Summertown, is a natural area in Maury County, Tennessee. The main feature of the area is Stillhouse Hollow Falls, a 75-foot (23 m) waterfall, which is located approximately two-thirds of a mile from the entrance. The natural area was acquired by the Tennessee Parks and Greenways Foundation (TPGF) and was later sold to the state of Tennessee. It was designated a natural area on June 3, 2006, under the Natural Areas Preservation Act of 1971.
