= Ecovillage Training Center =

Coordinates: 35°28′56″N 87°19′40″W

The Ecovillage Training Center was a "total immersion school" for sustainability. It was located at The Farm, an intentional community/ecovillage in Summertown, Tennessee, USA. The curricula of the center are "holistic and comprehensivist" and foster hands-on learning.

Albert Bates, a long-time resident of The Farm, founded the center in July 1994. The original farmhouse was refurbished and renamed "You're Inn at The Farm," to provide accommodation for participants. There are many permaculture design and energy conservation features at the Ecovillage Training Centre that result in a significant reduction in use of resources. These include a 5-kW solar electric system, water catchment, organic gardens, greywater treatment, ponds, wetlands, and natural buildings.

In addition to offering ecovillage apprenticeships, the Training Center's curriculum includes:

- Shiitake Mushroom Growing Basics
- Solar Installation
- Alternative Energy Systems
- Bamboo Cultivation and Construction
- Ecovillage Design and Permaculture Practicum
- Natural Building Basics

The center is affiliated with the Global Ecovillage Network, Gaia University and local colleges and offers college credit for several of its courses.
