= Orgasmic Birth: The Best-Kept Secret =

- Directed by: Debra Pascali-Bonaro
- Produced by: Debra Pascali-Bonaro; Kris Liem
- Edited by: Kris Liem
- Music by: John McDowell; Sabina Sciubba
- Release date: 2008
- Running time: 85 minutes
- Languages: English, Portuguese, French, German, Spanish

Orgasmic Birth: The Best-Kept Secret (also called Orgasmic Birth: 11 Mothers, 12 International Experts or just Orgasmic Birth) is a 2008 documentary film that examines the intimate nature of birth. It had been shown at women's and film festivals since May 2008, before being shown for the first time in prime time on January 2, 2009 by ABC’s 20/20.

The documentary follows the journey of eleven women through labour, presenting how blissful birth can be. Interviews with experts, doctors, midwives, gynecologists, anthropologists, neonatologists, nurses, Lamaze educators, and mothers and fathers explore how the birthing process has become a medical procedure rather than a natural process. Noted narrators include Ina May Gaskin.

While the documentary features several mothers who claim to have had an orgasm during labor, it is primarily about natural labour at the home without drugs.

== Book ==
Orgasmic Birth: Your Guide to a Safe, Satisfying, and Pleasurable Birth Experience by Elizabeth Davis and Debra Pascali-Bonaro, was first published on June 8, 2010.

== DVD release ==
The DVD was released in the United States on January 1, 2009, and soon after an international version was released.

== Soundtrack ==
The soundtrack was created by John McDowell (composer of the score for the documentary Born into Brothels), with additional composition by Sabina Sciubba (of the group Brazilian Girls). It is available to buy on CD.

== See also ==
- The Business of Being Born
- Home birth
- Water birth
