= Kate Amend =

American documentary film editor

- Occupation: Film editor

Kate Amend is an American documentary film editor whose career spans more than thirty years. She is known for being a dedicated editor who finds the emotional center of each scene she works with. A member of American Cinema Editors, Amend is the recipient of an Eddie Award for Into the Arms of Strangers: Stories of the Kindertransport (2001); she was nominated for a Primetime Emmy Award for The Case Against 8 (2014). She was the editor on two Academy Award-winning films: Into the Arms of Strangers (2014) and the Long Way Home (1997). She is the recipient of the International Documentary Association’s inaugural award for Outstanding Achievement in Editing. Amend graduated from UC Berkeley and San Francisco State University with a master's in humanities, later gaining an interest in film while teaching her discipline at the City College of San Francisco. She worked briefly at a production company of exploitation films before breaking into documentary work as an apprentice editor on Johanna Demetrakas's Right Out of History (1980). Amend is also noted for her work on Birth Story (2012) and The Long Way Home (1997).

== Partial filmography ==
- The Long Way Home (1997)
- Stories of the Kindertransport (2001)
- Beah: A Black Woman Speaks (2003)
- Thin (2006)
- Man from Plains (2007)
- American Harmony (2009)
- Cowboy del Amor (2009)
- First Position (2011)
- Birth Story: Ina May Gaskin and the Farm Midwives (2012)
- Sound of Redemption: The Frank Morgan Story (2014)
- Sands of Silence: Waves of Courage (2016)
