= Ina May Gaskin =

American midwife

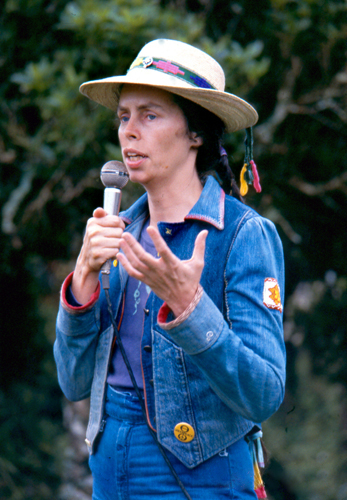
- Gaskin in 1981
- Born: Ina May Middleton; March 8, 1940 (age 86)
- Occupations: Midwife, writer, educator
- Organization: The Farm
- Spouse: Stephen Gaskin (m. 1976; died 2014)
- Children: 4
- Awards: The Right Livelihood Award, Tennessee Perinatal Association Recognition Award, ASPO/Lamaze Irwin Chabon Award; National Women's Hall of Fame

Ina May Gaskin (née Middleton; born March 8, 1940) is an American midwife who has been described as "the mother of authentic midwifery." She helped found the self-sustaining community, The Farm, with her husband Stephen Gaskin in 1971 where she markedly launched her career in midwifery. She is known for the Gaskin Maneuver and has written several books on midwifery and childbirth.

== Early life and family ==
=== Family ===
Gaskin was born to an Iowa Protestant family (Methodist on one side, Presbyterian on the other). Her father, Talford Middleton, was raised on a large Iowa farm, which was lost to a bank not long after his father's accidental death in 1926. Her mother, Ruth Stinson Middleton, was a home economics teacher, who taught in various small towns within a forty-mile radius of Marshalltown, Iowa. Both parents were college graduates, who placed great importance on higher education.

Her maternal grandparents ran a Presbyterian orphanage in Farmington, Missouri, a small town in the Ozarks. Her grandmother, Ina May Beard Stinson, directed the orphanage for many years after her pastor husband's death. She was an avid member of the Woman's Christian Temperance Union and a great admirer of Elizabeth Cady Stanton, Susan B. Anthony, and Jane Addams. Gaskin's paternal grandparents were all farmers. Adam Leslie Middleton, her grandfather, traveled and worked with farmers from Iowa, Illinois, Minnesota, South Dakota, Nebraska, and Kansas in cooperative grain marketing, organizing communities, as well as larger outlets in Chicago and other large cities, to establish local cooperative grain elevators. His work as an organizer took him to Canada to work with wheat growers, and to Washington, D. C., on the invitation of the Secretary of Agriculture under President Warren G. Harding, Henry C. Wallace, father of Henry A. Wallace, President Franklin Delano Roosevelt’s Secretary of Agriculture.

=== Education ===
After graduating from Marshalltown High School, she attended the University of Iowa and obtained her Bachelor's in English literature. She then joined the Peace Corps for several years and had the opportunity to be an English teacher in Malaysia. She returned to the United States and received her Master's of Arts from Northern Illinois University.

=== Before The Farm ===
In the 1960s, Ina May gave birth to her first child in which the physician used obstetrical forceps. The experience was so unpleasant that she searched for a better form of childbirth. Before The Farm was established, her husband Stephen was leading a speaking tour caravan in 1971, based on his philosophical seminars in San Francisco. It was for the first time on this tour that she helped a woman in childbirth. On March 16, as the caravan was traveling through Nebraska, Ina May went into labor. The baby, whom they named Christian, was born prematurely by 2 months, and died the next day. She was not allowed to keep the baby, and law enforcement made her bury the child in Nebraska. Her own personal experiences fueled her interest into midwifery and safe childbirth.

== The Farm Midwifery Center ==
In 1971 Gaskin, with her husband Stephen, founded a commune called The Farm in Summertown, Tennessee. There, she and the midwives of the Farm created The Farm Midwifery Center, one of the first out-of-hospital birthing centers in the United States. Family members and friends are commonly in attendance and are encouraged to take an active role in the birth. Gaskin found local family physician, Dr. John Williams, to serve as a mentor for her and other women looking to be midwives in this community. At that time, Dr. Williams had nearly 20 years experience serving Old Order Amish communities who had home births, so he was experienced with out-of-hospital childbirth. With his help and guidance, Ina May created The Farm Midwifery Center. They provide their services for the women of The Farm, as well as those outside the community. The center offers prenatal care environment accommodations for the childbirth event like apartments, houses, and cabins.

=== Outcomes ===
A study of home births assisted by the midwives of The Farm (Durand 1992) looked at the outcomes of 1,707 women who received care in rural Tennessee between 1971 and 1989. These births were compared to outcomes of over 14,000 physician-attended hospital births (including those typically labelled as high risk) in 1980. Comparing perinatal deaths, labor complications, and use of assisted delivery, the study found that "under certain circumstances (low risk pregnancies), home births attended by lay midwives can be accomplished as safely as, and with less intervention than, physician-attended hospital deliveries".

== Significance of her work ==
According to Carol Lorente (1995), the work of Gaskin and the midwives might not have had the impact it did, if it hadn't been for the publication of her book Spiritual Midwifery (1977):

"Considered a seminal work, it presented pregnancy, childbirth and breastfeeding from a fresh, natural and spiritual perspective, rather than the standard clinical viewpoint. In homebirth and midwifery circles, it made her a household name, and a widely respected teacher and writer."

By the early 1990s, after multiple reprints, Spiritual Midwifery was acknowledged as a "classical text on midwifery" with a "lasting impact".

Gaskin has been credited with the emergence and popularization of direct-entry midwifery (i.e. not training as a nurse first) in the United States since the early 1970s. Between 1977 and 2000, she published the quarterly magazine Birth Gazette. Ina May’s Guide to Childbirth, her second book about birth and midwifery, was published by Bantam/Dell in 2003. Her books have been published in several languages, including German, Italian, Hungarian, Slovenian, Spanish, and Japanese.

Since the early 1980s, she has been an internationally known speaker on maternity care independently and for the Midwives Alliance of North America (MANA), lecturing throughout the world to midwives, physicians, doulas, expectant parents and health policy-makers. She has spoken at medical and midwifery schools in several countries and at both the Starwood Festival and the WinterStar Symposium, discussing the history and importance of midwifery.

She is the founder of the Safe Motherhood Quilt Project, a national effort developed to draw public attention to maternal death rates, and to honor those women who have died of pregnancy-related causes since the 1980s.

She has appeared in films as Orgasmic Birth: The Best-Kept Secret (2009) (directed by Debra Pascali-Bonaro) and The Business of Being Born (2008) (directed by Abby Epstein and produced by Ricki Lake). She also appears in With Women: A Documentary About Women, Midwives and Birth (2006), and she is featured in a 2013 documentary about The Farm called American Commune.

== The Gaskin Maneuver ==
The Gaskin Maneuver, also called all fours, is a technique to reduce shoulder dystocia, a specific type of obstructed labour which may lead to fetal death. Gaskin introduced it in the U.S. in 1976 after learning it from a Belizean woman who had, in turn, learned the maneuver in Guatemala, where it originated. In this maneuver, the mother supports herself on her hands and knees to resolve shoulder dystocia. Switching to a hands and knees position causes the shape of the pelvis to change, thereby allowing the trapped shoulder to free itself and the baby to be born. Since this maneuver requires a significant movement from the standard lithotomy position, it can be substantially more difficult to perform while under epidural anesthesia, but still possible, and can be performed by an experienced delivery room team.

== Recognition ==
Gaskin served as President of Midwives' Alliance of North America from 1996 to 2002.

She was featured in Salon magazine's “Brilliant Careers” in 1999. Gaskin's book Birth Matters: A Midwife's Manifesta was named one of the International Planned Parenthood Federation's Top 6 Books of 2011.

In 2003, she was made a Visiting Fellow of Morse College, Yale University. She was awarded an honorary doctorate in recognition of her work demonstrating the effectiveness and safety of midwifery by Thames Valley University, England, on November 24, 2009.

She received the American Society for Psycho-Prophylaxis in Obstetrics/Lamaze Irwin Chabon Award (1997), and the Tennessee Perinatal Association Recognition Award. On September 29, 2011, Ina May Gaskin was announced as a co-winner of the 2011 Right Livelihood Award for "her whole-life's work teaching and advocating safe, woman-centred childbirth methods that best promote the physical and mental health of mother and child".

In 2013, she was inducted into the National Women's Hall of Fame.

== Bibliography ==
=== Books ===
- Gaskin, Ina May (1987). Babies, Breastfeeding, and Bonding. South Hadley, Mass.: Bergin & Garvey Publishers. ISBN 9780897891349. OCLC 15860611.
- Gaskin, Ina May (2014). Spiritual Midwifery. Strawberry Hills, NSW: ReadHowYouWant. ISBN 9781459647077. OCLC 907698021.
- Gaskin, Ina May (2012). Ina May's Guide to Childbirth. New York: Bantam Books. ISBN 9780553381153. OCLC 826306709.
- Gaskin, Ina May (2009). Ina May's Guide to Breastfeeding. UK: Pinter & Martin. ISBN 9781905177332. OCLC 768809453.
- Gaskin, Ina May (2015). Birth Matters: A Midwife's Manifesta. New York: Seven Stories Press. ISBN 9781583229279.

=== Articles ===
- All-Fours Maneuver for Reducing Shoulder Dystocia During Labor, The Journal of Reproductive Medicine, May, 1998.
- "Induced and Seduced: The Dangers of Cytotec". Mothering. July 2001. Archived from the original on August 26, 2004 – via FindArticles.
- The Undervalued Art of Vaginal Breech Birth: a Skill Every Birth Attendant Should Learn in Mothering, July-August, 2004. Retrieved: 2006-08-26.
- A Summary of Articles Published in English about Misoprostol (Cytotec) for Cervical Ripening or Induction of Labor, 2005-09-05 Retrieved: 2010-01-22.

== Filmography ==
- With Women: A Documentary About Women, Midwives and Birth (2006)
- The Business of Being Born (2008)
- Orgasmic Birth: The Best-Kept Secret (2009)
- American Commune (2013)
- Birth Story: Ina May Gaskin and the Farm Midwives (2013)

== Notes and references ==
Voluntary Peasants Labor of Love/The Farm Commune by Melvyn Stiriss, published by New Beat Books, Warwick, NY 2015
