= Stephen Gaskin =

American activist (1935–2014)

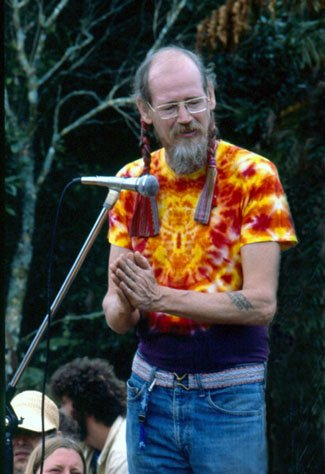
- Stephen Gaskin at the Nambassa in New Zealand, 1981
- Born: February 16, 1935; Denver, Colorado, U.S.
- Died: July 1, 2014 (aged 79); Summertown, Tennessee, U.S.
- Education: San Francisco State College (B.A., M.A.)
- Occupations: Activist, speaker, writer
- Spouses: Carol Groves (m. 1957; div. 1959) Carol Ladas (m. 1961; div. 1964) Margaret Nofziger (m. 1967; div. 1975) Ina May Middleton (m. 1976)

Stephen Gaskin (February 16, 1935 – July 1, 2014) was an American counterculture Hippie icon best known for his presence in the Haight-Ashbury district of San Francisco in the 1960s and for co-founding "The Farm", a spiritual commune in 1970. He was a Green Party presidential primary candidate in 2000 on a platform which included campaign finance reform, universal health care, and decriminalization of marijuana. He was the author of over a dozen books, a political activist, a philanthropic organizer and a self-proclaimed professional Hippie.

== Life ==
Gaskin was born in Denver, Colorado and served in the United States Marine Corps from 1952 to 1955 and saw combat in Korea. Then, having dropped out of junior college, he ran coffee houses. In the 1960s, he moved to San Francisco and taught English, creative writing, and general semantics at San Francisco State College, where he was a student of S. I. Hayakawa.

Gaskin's writing class evolved into an open discussion group known as Monday Night Class, which involved up to 1500 students. Through 1968, the class was held at San Francisco State University Campus, later in "The Family Dog", an auditorium located on the shore of the Pacific Ocean in the Outer Richmond neighborhood of San Francisco. Gaskin spoke about his experiences with psychedelic drugs and paranormal experiences, and lectured about the importance of ecological awareness. This popular weekly gathering was attended by hippies from all over the San Francisco Bay Area during the years 1968–1970. Gaskin became known as "San Francisco's acid guru".

In 1970, Gaskin and a caravan of 60 vehicles crossed the United States to settle 60 miles south-west of Nashville, Tennessee, forming a community called "The Farm", which the Wall Street Journal came to call "the General Motors of American Communes". This community was "a platform from which to launch efforts to improve the lot of poor and indigenous peoples, whales, and old growth trees". The Farm eventually transitioned to an intentional community in Summertown, Tennessee. For example, the community raised 1,200 earthquake-resistant homes and several public buildings and water lines in 5 villages in Guatemala, sent independent dosimetry teams after the Three Mile Island accident and the Chernobyl disaster, and gave the Rainbow Warrior equipment to escape from a Spanish harbor.

Gaskin went to prison in 1974 for marijuana possession, because some members of the community had planted several marijuana plants on the nearby "Martin Farm" property, against his recommendation. This was a nearby property where the Caravan first "landed" in Summertown, before purchasing the initial 1200 acres of "the Farm". He served one year of a three-year sentence. After his release, his voting rights were rescinded. He brought a lawsuit challenging the legality of mass retroactive disenfranchisement under the Tennessee Constitution in the case Gaskin v. Collins. After winning in lower courts, the case went to the Tennessee Supreme Court and in 1981 returned voting rights to more than a quarter of a million convicts.

In Volume One: Sunday Morning Services on the Farm and earlier talks, Gaskin produced a substantial body of spiritual teaching. His ideas are now contained in books and tapes of the Sunday Morning Services which were published by the Book Publishing Company on The Farm. They speak of magic, energy and life in community as well as of service to humanity.

Gaskin was the first recipient of the Right Livelihood Award in 1980 (listed as Plenty International) and was inducted into the Counterculture Hall of Fame in 2004. He was awarded the Golden Bolt Award by The Farm Motor Pool (for helping buy a lemon semi), and won the Guru-Off (without even entering), racking up 77 points to Krishnamurti's 73.

Gaskin continued to work as an international activist, writer and speaker until a few months before his death. His topics ranged from humorous advice on all aspects of communal life and farming to modern communications, the counter-culture, spirituality, drug law reform, and social and ecological issues. He was a drummer in The Farm Band, an early Jam Band which toured in the 1970s and 1980s. His last published works were revised and annotated versions of Monday Night Class and The Caravan. He died of natural causes on July 1, 2014.

== Bibliography ==
In order of first publication date.

- — (1964). Forty Miles of Bad Road (Fiction, typed manuscript). OCLC 6235330. [WorldCat.org: A creative work submitted to San Francisco State College in partial fulfillment for the degree Master of Arts.] Copy available at the San Francisco State University Library.
- — (2005) [1970]. Monday Night Class. Recorded and transcribed by William Meyers (Rev. and annotated ed.). Summertown, TN, USA: The Book Publishing Company. ISBN 9781570671814. OCLC 318941623. LCCN 74135168, 2005011769. (original edition ©1970 by Book Farm and published by Book Farm, Santa Rosa, California.)
- — (2007) [1972]. The Caravan (Rev. ed.). Summertown, TN, USA: The Book Publishing Company. ISBN 9781570671951. OCLC 77004166.
- — (1974). Hey Beatnik!: This is the Farm Book. Farmer-Centred Agricultural Resource Management Programme. Summertown, TN, USA: The Book Publishing Company. ASIN B0006W3AZE. OCLC 1309762. This book was printed on low quality paper which deteriorated rapidly. A few copies are in library inventories.
- — (1977). McClure, Matthew (ed.). Volume One: Sunday Morning Services on The Farm. Summertown, TN, USA: The Book Publishing Company. ISBN 9789139900863. OCLC 4128110.
- — (1977). Stephen Speaks to San Francisco (Pamphlet). Summertown, TN, USA: The Book Publishing Company. ISBN 9781570671951. OCLC 23292310.
- — (1978). This Season's People: A Book of Spiritual Teachings. Summertown, TN, USA: The Book Publishing Company. ISBN 9780913990056. OCLC 3049964.
- — (1980) [1979]. Mind at Play. Summertown, TN, USA: The Book Publishing Company. ISBN 9780913990247. OCLC 609405566.
- — (1999) [1980]. Amazing Dope Tales (Third ed.). Berkeley, CA, USA: Ronin Publishing. ISBN 9781579510107. OCLC 41419976.
  Earlier editions published as:
- — (1980). Amazing dope tales and Haight Ashbury flashbacks. Summertown, TN, USA: The Book Publishing Company. ISBN 9780913990292. OCLC 7817614.
- — (1983). Irrwitzige Dope-Geschichten und Erinnerungen an Haight-Ashbury (in German). Linden, Germany: Volksverl. ISBN 9781570671951. OCLC 74755699.
- — (1990). Haight Ashbury Flashbacks (Second ed.). Berkeley, CA, USA: Ronin Publishing. ISBN 9780914171300. OCLC 23609888.
- — (1986) [1981]. Rendered Infamous: A Book of Political Reality. Westport, CT: Greenwood Publishing Group. ISBN 9780913990322. OCLC 644929240.
- — (May 1983). "The Hidden Holocaust". New Age Journal. Boston, MA: Rising Star Associates. ISBN 9781570671951. ISSN 0746-3618. OCLC 679402858.
  Reprinted as
- — (1983). The Hidden Holocaust: Stephen Gaskin Reveals What's Really Going On in Guatemala. Summertown, TN, USA: Plenty International. OCLC 656850481.
- — (1997) [1996]. Cannabis Spirituality: Including 13 Guidelines for Sanity and Safety (Second ed.). New York, NY: High Times. ISBN 9780964785861. OCLC 39608629.
- — (2000). An Outlaw in My Heart: A Political Activist's User's Manual. Philadelphia, PA, USA: Camino Books. ISBN 9780940159648. OCLC 680493217.

== See also ==
- Alternative lifestyle
- Counterculture
- Counterculture of the 1960s
- Ina May Gaskin
- Plenty International
