= TennGreen Land Conservancy =

U.S. nonprofit land trust

- Formation: 1998; 28 years ago
- Type: Nonprofit
- Tax ID no.: 62-1557574
- Legal status: 501(c)(3)
- Headquarters: Nashville, Tennessee
- Board President: Bob Sarratt
- Executive Director: Alice Hudson Pell
- Board of directors: Bob Sarratt; Andrew Rueff; David Dotson; Beau Fish; Steve Hinkley, Michael Mauritz; Drew Philpot; Anne Davis; Matthew J. McClanahan; Marcya A Carter-Sheats; Scott Bowman; Green Faircloth; John Fenderson; Jim Garges; Laurel Graefe; Christopher C. Haigler; Jacqueline Harp; Les McDonald; Christy Moberly; Nick Nunn; Alice Hudson Pell; Alan Webb;
- Website: https://tenngreen.org/
- Formerly called: Tennessee Parks and Greenways Foundation

TennGreen Land Conservancy, formerly the Tennessee Parks & Greenways Foundation, is a non-profit land trust, established in 1998 to protect natural and scenic land in Tennessee. It is accredited by the Land Trust Alliance's Land Trust Accreditation Commission. A 501c3 nonprofit, TennGreen is funded by the generosity of Tennesseans.

TennGreen's mission is to conserve land where people and nature can thrive. The organization's vision statement is "We envision a Tennessee where land, animals, and natural habitats are protected forever; a place where people appreciate nature and engage with us to conserve it."

TennGreen conserves land throughout Tennessee through two mechanisms: acquisition of land for public benefit (e.g., State Parks, State Natural Areas, National Parks, County/City Parks, Wildlife Management Areas) and through Conservation Easements. Conservation Easements are legal restrictions on property whereas specific landowner's rights are donated to the nonprofit to be upheld in perpetuity (including the right to subdivide the property, the right to extract resources from the property, and the right to develop the property). TennGreen also helps communities fundraise for conservation initiatives. Through these mechanisms, more than 56,000 acres of land across Tennessee has been conserved by TennGreen and partners.

Key Acquisition Projects include Cummins Falls in Jackson County; Wells Hill Park and the Joy Gleghorn Nature Preserve in Lincoln County; Scott's Gulf Wilderness Expansions; key lands for the Justin P. Wilson Cumberland Trail State Park; lands along the Hatchie River State Scenic River in west Tennessee; and lands at Royal Blue WMA in east Tennessee.
