= Plenty International =

American nonprofit organization

- Plenty International
- Formation: 1974; 52 years ago
- Type: Nonprofit
- Tax ID no.: 23-7432298
- Legal status: 501(c)(3)
- Headquarters: Summertown, Tennessee
- Board Chair: Lisa Wartinger
- Executive Director: Dan Bright
- Award: Right Livelihood Award
- Website: https://plenty.org/

Plenty International is an environmental, humanitarian aid and human rights organization based in Summertown, Tennessee, United States.

== Background ==
In 1974, Stephen Gaskin and The Farm, an intentional community, started an outreach program called Plenty. In response to the devastating 1976 Guatemala earthquake, Plenty sent carpenters who built schools, houses and clinics in remote Mayan villages and a clinic for Mother Teresa. In its first ten years, Plenty established a clinic and orphanage in Bangladesh, an appropriate technology training center and reforestation program in Lesotho, and a wind-powered electric lighting system in a Carib Indian school in Dominica. It provided disaster relief in the "Developing" World and free ambulance service to the South Bronx which helped to train emergency personnel what then became New York City's EMS. It went to sea with Greenpeace and gave the Rainbow Warrior its ham radio, slo-scan TV, and radiation monitoring equipment. Plenty put Native American FM stations on the air, and pioneered amateur-band television and radio to keep its remote outposts of volunteers connected.

Plenty continues to work with Native American primary health care, midwifery, microeconomics, food and ecotourism cooperatives and alternative building programs, including the hemp house on the Pine Ridge Indian Reservation with the assistance of The Farm School.

Following the catastrophic landfall of Hurricane Katrina near New Orleans in August 2005, Plenty volunteers worked on a neighborhood-by-neighborhood basis to deliver essential supplies and re-establish civil order. Plenty worked with Veterans for Peace, Camp Casey, and others to place volunteers where they were most needed. Plenty stayed on scene for the following year and organized clean-up and repair of the damage along the coastlines of Alabama, Mississippi and Louisiana, including the cities of Mobile (Alabama), Biloxi and Gulfport (Mississippi), and Slidell (Louisiana). Plenty also brought displaced and disadvantaged children from the Gulf Coast back to The Farm to participate in its Kids To The Country summer nature school in 2006.

Plenty was awarded the Right Livelihood Award in 1980 for "caring, sharing and acting with and on behalf of those in need at home and abroad."
