= The Farm (Tennessee) =

Intentional community in Tennessee, US

Coordinates: 35°29′5″N 87°19′52″W

- Type: Commune
- Headquarters: Summertown, Tennessee, US
- Area served: 1750 Acres
- Key people: Stephen Gaskin; Ina May Gaskin; Albert Bates
- Services: Ecovillage Training Center; Plenty International
- Members: 200-225
- Website: thefarmcommunity.com

The Farm is an intentional community in Lewis County, Tennessee, near the community of Summertown, Tennessee, based on principles of nonviolence, respect for the Earth, and veganism. It was founded in 1971 by Stephen Gaskin and 300 spiritual seekers from Haight-Ashbury, San Francisco. The Farm served as the birthplace of the midwifery revival in the United States and played a central role in launching the contemporary home birth movement. Its members have founded a number of nonprofit organizations, including Plenty International, a relief and development organization, and Swan Conservation Trust, who established the 1,358 acres (550 ha) Big Swan Headwaters Preserve. The Farm has approximately 200 members and residents. The Farm played a role in popularizing soy foods, such as tofu, tempeh, and soymilk, in America.

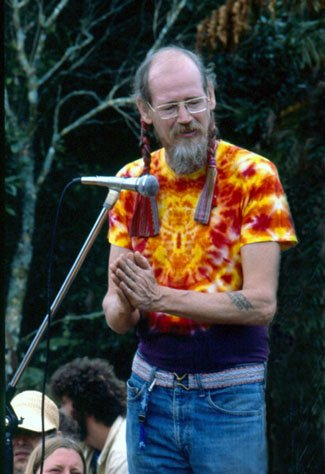
Stephen Gaskin at Nambassa Alternatives festival, New Zealand, 1981

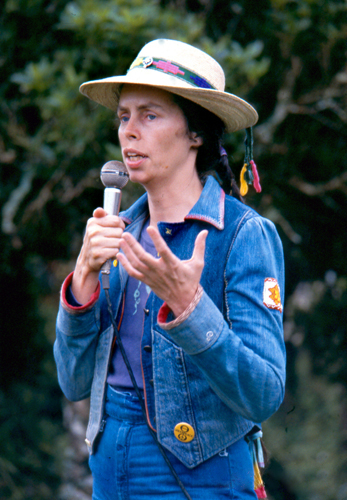
Ina May Gaskin at Nambassa festival, New Zealand, 1981

The Farm experienced rapid early growth that strained its infrastructure and finances, leading to a major restructuring in 1983 known as “the Changeover,” after which it stabilized as a smaller, self-sustaining intentional community focused on education, entrepreneurship, and social change.

== Origins ==
The Farm was established after Stephen Gaskin and friends led a caravan of 60 buses, vans, and trucks from San Francisco on a four-month speaking tour across the US. Along the way, they became a community, lacking only land to put down roots. After returning to California, the decision was made to buy land together. Combining all their resources would finance purchase of only about fifty acres in California. Another month on the road brought the group back to Tennessee, where they checked out various locales that might be suitable to settle. They decided on property in Lewis County, about seventy miles south of Nashville. After buying 1,064 acres (4.1 km^{2}) for $70 per acre, the group began building its community in the woods alongside the network of crude logging roads that followed its ridgelines. Shortly thereafter, an adjoining 750 acres (3.0 km^{2}) were purchased for $100 per acre.

From its founding in the 1970s, Farm members took vows of poverty and owned no personal possessions other than clothing and tools, though this restriction loosened as time passed. During that time, Farm members did not use artificial birth control, alcohol, tobacco, or animal products. Many of the early buildings on the Farm were unconventional, ranging from converted school buses to modified 16 x 32 army tents. Over time, larger homes were constructed, each providing shelter for multiple families and single people, often with up to 40 people under one roof. Visitors were also housed in a two-story tent made by sewing two army tents together.

In the early days, Gaskin was considered to be the "abbot of the monastery" and made many of the governmental decisions for the group. His role was eventually taken over by a "council of elders" and then a "board of directors" consisting of some of the most respected and influential members of the Farm community. The Farm formed a non-profit corporation called The Foundation to provide a common financial structure for the community and members contributed their incomes to it. A security crew constantly maintained a welcome center at the entrance gate where all traffic passed through and was logged in.

In the original manifestation of The Farm, all members were believers in the holiness of life, and believed in the reality of a spiritual dimension and in living out universal brotherhood.

The Farm community ate what might today be called a vegan diet. In the introduction of 1978 edition of The Farm Vegetarian Cookbook it states, "We are completely vegetarian. We eat no meat, fish, poultry, eggs, or any kind of animal dairy products. Our diet is based on the soybean, which we eat in many different forms, along with other legumes, grains, fruits and vegetables. We grow our own food and recommend it whenever possible." The book is described as the "family cookbook" of the 1,100 residents living on 1,750 acres in southern Middle Tennessee. The rationale for the diet is stated thus: "We are vegetarians because one-third of the world is starving and at least half goes to bed hungry every night. If everyone was vegetarian, there would be enough food to go around, and no one would be hungry."

Gaskin, who had served in the United States Marine Corps, got his start as a religious leader in San Francisco in the 1960s, coming to teach a blend of Eastern religions and Christianity. Due to his devotion to marijuana, he and three followers spent time in 1974 in the Tennessee State Penitentiary in Nashville following convictions for growing marijuana on Farm land.

== Community evolution ==
=== Early growth ===
The Farm's outreach, combined with notoriety through popular media articles, led to a population boom that eventually peaked at around 1600 members living on the main property. Additionally, some satellite farm affinity communities which were located in the U.S. and other countries consolidated by moving to the Tennessee community. Signs started to appear between 1975 and 1979 that the Tennessee community's weak infrastructure and low income was insufficiently developed to support such a continuously large influx of new members, most of whom did not contribute substantially. The Foundation went increasingly into debt. Members chose to turn over all money to the collective. Some donated inherited wealth or investment income, but most of it went for the group's Third World projects, or for immediate needs such as food and clothing, rather than planned improvements to the property. Occasionally Gaskin would request a large sum to fund his traveling expenses, which included touring around the world. Cottage industries including sorghum molasses, a publishing company, and natural food did not generate sufficient income.

Furthering the Farm's growing pains was a baby boom resulting from the large number of young adults of childbearing age combined with an enthusiastic pro-natal philosophy being put into practice. Ina May Gaskin and other resident midwives advertised their services in the national underground press, which led to numerous couples and their infants moving in without contributing. A small number of infants were adopted by Farm members after the midwives offered to accept, deliver, and keep a woman's baby as an alternative to abortion. Most mothers kept their babies after the children were born or came back for them not long after.

Gaskin insisted that anyone who wished to partake of Farm life should be allowed to try, even those who were seriously mentally ill, believing the experience would be therapeutic. These proved to be a huge drain on the patience and energy of the residents. Lack of electricity and insufficient capacity of sewage infrastructure resources led to some giardia outbreaks and malcontent. Gaskin discouraged expressions of discontent and doubt, so that it was impossible to question the established order or propose improvements. As the Farm's population peaked, a disproportionately higher number of children or less-skilled residents could not significantly contribute to the community's economic needs. Gaskin, who was often traveling, may not have been aware of the seriousness of these deprivations, or believed they would improve if members persevered.

=== The Changeover ===
In 1983, due to financial difficulties and also a challenge to Stephen Gaskin's leadership and direction, The Farm changed its residential community agreement and began requiring members to support themselves with their own income rather than to donate all income to The Foundation central corporation. This decollectivization was called the Changeover. Many people left disillusioned. The surrounding local rural area provided few possibilities for outside employment. The nearest large city, Nashville, was 75 miles (121 km) away. Those who could not adapt to the new dynamics of The Changeover found it difficult to remain. Those who had forged independent business opportunities or had reduced overhead could afford to stay.

=== Recovery ===
Eventually the population settled back down to fewer than 200 adults and children. Those who continued living in the community were buoyed by its freedom and peaceful atmosphere, and the safety and security it provided for their children. The $400,000 plus debt was paid off after several years and the community became debt-free. An entrepreneurial spirit took hold, and numerous small businesses were established to provide support for the residents. Many members went back to school to get degrees in the medical field, and many now work at clinics and hospitals throughout Middle Tennessee.

In the 1990s, with the community back on solid ground, The Farm returned to its original purpose of initiating social change through outreach and example. The Ecovillage Training Center was established as an educational facility in new technologies such as solar energy, bio fuels, and construction techniques based on locally available, eco-friendly materials.

=== Recent status ===
The Farm's population is, as of summer 2026 approximately 225; residents, many of whom are baby boomers often having lived on The Farm for most of its existence. Those interested in becoming residents are encouraged to visit during the bi-annual Farm Experience Weekend, which provides a glimpse into how the community operates and functions.

In 2004, the Wholeo Dome (a geodesic dome fourteen feet in diameter and seven feet tall, covered with curved stained glass panels) was installed at The Farm. It was created in 1974 by artist Caroling Geary. In May 2010 repairs were completed on the Wholeo Dome, but is currently in storage due to issues with the lead in stained glass artwork.

The Farm maintains contact with some of its 4,000-plus former members through email lists, social media forums, an annual reunion each summer, and through the work of its nonprofit organizations. Former members have gone on to become leaders in many different fields and endeavors, maintaining a sense of right livelihood and a commitment to the betterment of the world.

== Social and family issues ==
Stephen Gaskin believed that marriage was a sacred act and that "for a community to exist in harmony and balance, both kinds of energy had to be nurtured, and most importantly shared." Seriousness and commitment were required in marriage. With the exception of the rhythm method, in the early years birth control was frowned upon, and abortions were prohibited in the community. As an alternative to abortion, the Farm publicly offered to deliver any baby for free and then to find a loving family to raise the child. If the birth mother ever wanted the child she could have it back, and ultimately most kept their babies. Childbearing was natural, and births were attended by midwives. Premarital sex was greatly discouraged, and most couples on the Farm were married.

== Projects ==
The Farm had its own electrical crew, composting crew, farming crew, communications, construction & demolition crew, clinic, firewood crew, alternative energy crew, motor pool, laundromat, tofu plant, bakery, school and ambulance service. It established The Book Publishing Company, which has published the works of the Gaskins and other Farm members. The Farm's midwifery school and Ina May Gaskin's germinal book Spiritual Midwifery emphasize maternal and newborn compassion, safety and natural home birth.

They also ran a "soy dairy", which developed and later marketed a soymilk ice "cream" called "Ice-Bean", and a vegetable store in the town of Summertown.

=== Tennessee Farm Band ===
They maintained The Farm Band, a rock group in the early 'jam band' style, which toured the country performing for free at parks, schools, churches, and other accessible venues. Albums from the 1970s include The Farm Band on Mantra Records, and Up in Your Thing, High On the Rim of the Nashville Basin and Communion on Farm Tapes & Records. There were also a number of 45 releases. All Farm Band recordings were self-produced and distributed. During the 2000s, Akarma Records in Italy distributed bootleg copies of these albums. In addition to the rock music recordings, Stephen Gaskin released a spoken word album titled the Great Western Tour in 1974, which was produced and distributed in the same way as their other LPs.

=== The Nuclear Regulatory Commission ===
Another music project of The Farm was the Nuclear Regulatory Commission (also known as "NRC"), a new wave music band. They released a 7-inch EP, We Are the NRC, and an album, Reactor, in 1980, and a second 7-inch EP, Sally's All Alone (After the End), in 1982.

=== Plenty ===
Plenty International logo

In 1974, after helping local neighbors after a tornado, the Farm formed Plenty (later, Plenty International), its charitable works arm. It began by gathering and supplying food for local disaster victims and holding weekly "quilting bees" to make blankets for them.

Plenty's most notable early project was its four-year presence in the Guatemalan highlands after the earthquake of 1976, helping to rebuild 1,200 houses and lay 27 kilometers (17 miles) of waterpipe. There, it established a micro-commune of volunteers and their families, living simply among Mayan populations and working under the approval of the military government.

In 1980, Plenty was the recipient of the first Right Livelihood Award, an alternative to the Nobel prize, also based in Sweden.

Plenty donated an ambulance in the early 1980s to the Akwesasne Mohawk Reservation in upstate New York. Two Farmies – one a paramedic and one an EMT – taught a licensed Emergency Medical Technician course to 22 reservation residents, helping them set up their first Mohawk-run EMT service, the Mohawk Council of Akwesasne Ambulance Unit. Plenty has set up medical clinics in Lesotho and Mexico and created the Jefferson Award-winning South Bronx Ambulance Project in New York City.

Plenty maintains an office in Belize, Central America, which initiated a school lunch program based on organic gardens planted next to each school to help provide more fresh vegetables for the children's diets. A midwifery program helped train over 60 Mayan women from villages throughout the region in prenatal care and safe delivery techniques.

Plenty was one of the first relief organizations to enter New Orleans, getting past federal roadblocks to bring supplies to survivors just three days after Hurricane Katrina. Plenty helped establish a base camp for volunteers and channeled funding to Common Ground Collective, a local group assisting in cleanup, legal defense services, and the operation of free clinics. Plenty volunteers purchased and restored a home in the area to serve as a headquarters for housing relief volunteers and construction crews helping to rebuild homes.

Melvyn Stiriss, a Plenty volunteer carpenter, describes a year of earthquake reconstruction, working with Mayans, in Hippie Peace Corps Goes to Guatemala, part 4 of Voluntary Peasants published by New Beat Books, Warwick, NY 2015.

=== Book Publishing Company ===
Some of the early titles produced by the Book Publishing Company illustrated the early interests of the Farm community; volumes included The Farm Vegetarian Cookbook (ed. Louise Hagler, 1975), Volume One: Sunday Morning Services on the Farm by Stephen Gaskin, ...this season's people by Stephen Gaskin, Spiritual Midwifery by Ina May Gaskin, A Cooperative Method of Natural Birth by Margaret Nofziger, The Big Dummy's Guide to C.B. Radio by Albert Houston and the Radio Crew, and Shutdown: Nuclear Power on Trial, by John Gofman and Ernest Sternglass. Book Publishing Company publishes under the imprints Healthy Living, GroundSwell Books, Native Voices, 7th Generation, and Books Alive. For over 31 years Joanne Stepaniak has been Supervising Editor at Book Publishing Company.

== Technology ==
=== Infrastructure ===
There was no infrastructure grid on The Farm's land when it was first settled by the nascent community. Originally relying on antique kerosene lanterns and manual message runners, The Farm grew rapidly to adopt appropriate technology for electricity, communications, medical, mass media, education, and entertainment. Some of the early residents of The Farm brought their skills as engineers and technicians with them; they took on a multi-year development to build The Farm's novel network of communications and electrical supply.

Initially, a single landline or party line shared with several of their Tennessee neighbors was available for outside telephone calls, with a waiting list for any calls. Spurred mainly by the need for prompt childbirth assistance and emergency medical response, a field-phone style party line system was installed by The Farm's telephone crew in 1971. Telephone lines were expanded to widely cover even the most remote areas over the following year. Instead of common telephone bell ringers, the first telephones used Morse code beeps to signal a call. The party line, affectionately known as Beatnik Bell, was eventually enabled in 1974 to route calls via a manual operator interconnect link patch to the outside line. Later, a 500 line Kellogg-ITT Relaymatic rotary dial phone system was installed in PBX configuration, with multiple outside trunk lines gated through a plug-style manual switchboard operator. Basic community CATV cables were later run to some areas along the telephone line paths.

The Farm installed its own water system and water towers. Some individuals initially resisted running electricity and power lines beyond the administration office and publishing center, with the hope of establishing off-grid decentralized utilities instead. The electrical supply 120/240 VAC mains system evolved from supplying only a few industrial buildings near the main Farm Road in 1971 to the point by the 1980s where most areas were covered by 12-volt automotive battery trickle charge systems. Most homes phased out the use of kerosene lamps by 1975, as they converted to 12-volt lighting and RV appliances or re-purposed automotive lighting fixtures. Off-grid low voltage 12-volt DC systems were also sometimes powered by swapping vehicle batteries. After the economic change in 1983, all homes were connected to the standard electrical grid.

=== Wireless communications ===
The first use of wireless communications on The Farm was in 1971, when a ham radio HF SSB system was set up. Ham radio was used for health and welfare regional communications between mobile ham operators who were on the road with The Farm Band. The Farm Net, as the ham radio network was known, evolved into a worldwide daily operations schedule on 21332 kHz and 21442 kHz Upper Sideband and CW Morse Code in the 15-meter band, and a regional daily morning schedule on 7245 kHz Lower Sideband in the 40-meter ham band. At the network's peak in 1978, The Farm Net included over 40 ham radio operators on associated and affinity communities, as well as many HF SSB mobile and battery-operated portable HF radio stations. From its main base station, The Farm Net expanded to cover HF SSB communication links to stations in North America, Africa, and Europe using a field of tall radio towers on The Farm's ridgetop. Ham radio operators from The Farm volunteered with the Plenty International disaster relief operations for the 1976 Guatemala earthquake, with the Greenpeace anti-whaling campaigns, and many humanitarian response efforts worldwide. Ham radio was invaluable for voice communications consultations between doctors and field medical teams, and it included the use of HF slow scan TV for the relatively new concept of telemedicine. The ham radio was also used for technical discussions about alternative sources of energy, a popular topic among the back-to-the-land-movement, especially during the time of the 1970s energy crisis. The Farm's ham radio operators also used CB radios, as the cost of CB transceivers had dropped impressively during the mid-1970s. CB radios were widely adopted by The Farm for mobile general purpose local communications during this time, while CB radio was starting to become a nationwide craze. This eventually led to the writing of the book The Big Dummy's Guide to CB Radio, which became a non-fiction bestseller. The popularity and sales of The Big Dummy's Guide To CB Radio fueled the launch of the Book Publishing Company's new printing presses, and provided much-needed income for The Farm at a crucial time in its growth. Later, The Farm's medical and security communications utilized VHF FM handheld two-way radios.

== Organizations ==
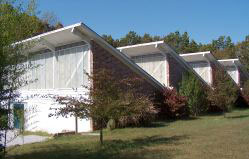
Solar School Building of The Farm School

The Farm is home to many organizations, including:

- The Midwifery Center, was led by Ina May Gaskin, who is often referred to as "the mother of authentic midwifery."
- The Ecovillage Training Center, which offered conferences and seminars on organic gardening, permaculture, strawbale construction, and sustainable technologies.
- Plenty International, is an international aid and development NGO that helps indigenous populations, at-risk children, and the environment.
- More Than Warmth, a project in which children create quilts to be sent abroad in countries dealing with conflict.

=== The Farm School ===
The Farm School Logo

The Farm School Solar and Satellite Campuses are K-12 programs that offer alternative education options for home-based learners (over 1200 students) and at a schoolhouse (approximately 25 students) on The Farm.

== In the media ==
The Farm was featured in Peter Jenkins' travel book A Walk Across America.

The Farm is the subject of the documentary American Commune, directed by Rena Mundo Croshere and her sister Nadine Mundo, both of whom were children at The Farm from the mid-1970s until The Changeover in the early 1980s.

== Sources and further reading ==
- Voluntary Peasants: memoirs of the community's origin and life on The Farm by UPI's Melvyn Stiriss, "who followed the 60s over the edge".
- Coate, John (1987). "Life on the Bus and Farm: an Informal Recollection."
- Fike, Rupert (ed), Voices from The Farm: Adventures in Community Living (1998) ISBN 1-57067-051-X
- Jenkins, Peter. A Walk Across America. Jenkins discusses his stay at The Farm in Chapters 20 through 22. William Morrow & Co., 1979.
- Kauffman, Jonathan (2018). Hippie Food: How Back-To-The-Landers, Longhair, and Revolutionaries Changed the Way We Eat. William Morrow. ISBN 978-0062437303.
- Kern, Louis (1993). The Farm Midwives. Retrieved February 1, 2008, from The Farm Web site
- "Why We Left The Farm", Whole Earth Review #49, Winter 1985, pp 56–66 (stories from eight former members)
- "Farm Stories", Whole Earth Review #60, Fall 1988, pp 88–101 (reprinted from the WELL, by two former members)
