= Summertown, Tennessee =

- Census-designated place
- Location of Summertown in Lawrence County, Tennessee.

- Location within Tennessee Location within the United States
- Coordinates: 35°26′05″N 87°18′46″W
- Country: United States
- State: Tennessee
- County: Lawrence

Area
  - Total: 2.01 sq mi (5.21 km^{2})
  - Land: 2.01 sq mi (5.21 km^{2})
  - Water: 0 sq mi (0.00 km^{2})
- Elevation: 991 ft (302 m)

Population (2020)
  - Total: 856
  - Density: 425.7/sq mi (164.38/km^{2})
- Time zone: Central (CST)
  - Summer (DST): CDT
- ZIP code: 38483
- Area code: 931
- GNIS feature ID: 1271843
- FIPS code: 47-72040

Summertown is an unincorporated community and census-designated place (CDP) in Lawrence County, Tennessee, United States. The population of Summertown was 866 at the 2010 census. The community has a ZIP Code of 38483. Some rural areas in neighboring Lewis and Maury counties also use a "Summertown" mailing address, but their population is not included in the Census figures.

== Geography ==
Summertown is in northeastern Lawrence County and is bordered to the north by Lewis County and to the northeast by Maury County. Tennessee State Route 20 passes through the center of town, leading east 2 miles (3 km) to U.S. Route 43 and northwest 19 miles (31 km) to Hohenwald. US-43 leads south 14 miles (23 km) to Lawrenceburg, the Lawrence county seat, and northeast 20 miles (32 km) to Columbia.

According to the U.S. Census Bureau, the Summertown CDP has an area of 2.0 square miles (5.2 km^{2}), all of it recorded as land. The community is drained by the North and South Forks of Saw Creek, a west-flowing tributary of the Buffalo River, which in turn flows northwest to the Duck River shortly before that river's mouth at the Tennessee River.

== Demographics ==
=== 2020 census ===
As of the census of 2020, there were 856 people.

Historical population
Census	Pop.	Note	%±
2020	856		—
U.S. Decennial Census

== Education ==
Summertown is served by the Lawrence County School System. The community is home to three public schools:

- Summertown Elementary School: Serves students from kindergarten through 6th grade.
- Summertown Middle School: Serves students in 7th and 8th grade.
- Summertown High School: Serves students from 9th through 12th grade.

All three schools share the Eagle as their mascot.

=== Athletics ===
Summertown High School has a history of competition at the state level within the Tennessee Secondary School Athletic Association (TSSAA). The athletic department offers programs including football, basketball, baseball, softball, volleyball, tennis, golf, and cheerleading.

=== State Championships ===
The school has earned multiple state titles, most notably in baseball, softball, and volleyball.

Sport	Championship Years
Baseball	2021
Softball	2021
Volleyball	2018, 2019, 2020

== Tornadoes ==
The Summertown area historical tornado activity is slightly above Tennessee state average. It is 108% greater than the overall U.S. average.

On May 18, 1995, an F-4 (max. wind speeds 207-260 mph) tornado a mile away from Summertown killed 3 people, injured 32 people and caused between $500,000 and $5,000,000 in damages.

On April 16, 1998, an F-5 (max. wind speeds 261-318 mph) tornado right on Highway 43 in Summertown killed 3 people, injured 36 people and caused $13 million in damages.

There have been several other tornadoes to come through Summertown but these are two of the worst.

== Attractions and areas of interest ==
The following are located in or near Summertown:

- The Farm, a quasi-intentional community
- Plenty International, an environmental and human rights organization
- Stillhouse Hollow Falls State Natural Area, a Tennessee natural area
- McKamey Manor A horror attraction which became popular due to the horrific things which are alleged to happen inside of the manor. Locals are also supposedly described as hating the attraction for disturbing the reputation of the town.
