= Union (Toni Childs album) =

Studio album by Toni Childs
- Released: June 10, 1988
- Genres: Pop; folk; blues; world
- Length: 44:52
- Label: A&M
- Producers: David Ricketts, David Tickle, Toni Childs

Toni Childs chronology
Union (1988)	House of Hope (1991)

Singles from Union
- 1. "Stop Your Fussin'" Released: July 21, 1988; 2. "Don't Walk Away" Released: August 1988; 3. "Walk and Talk Like Angels" Released: 1988; 4. "Zimbabwae" Released: 1989

Professional ratings
Review scores
Source	Rating
AllMusic	4/5 stars

Union is the debut album by American singer-songwriter Toni Childs. Released in 1988, the album peaked at number 63 in the US (where it has since been certified Gold for sales of over 500,000 copies). It also peaked at number one in New Zealand, where it was certified platinum. Four singles were released from the album: "Stop Your Fussin'", "Don't Walk Away", "Walk and Talk Like Angels", and "Zimbabwae". "Stop Your Fussin'" reached the top 20 in Australia, New Zealand, and Germany while "Don't Walk Away" became Childs' only single to chart in the United States, reaching number 72 there.

The album was recorded in London, Paris, and Swaziland. Childs collaborated with David Ricketts and David Baerwald (who recorded the 1986 album Boomtown as David + David) in the writing and production of the album. Time Magazine described Union as an album that "catches the sweet, scary feelings, all the uncertainty and release, that can come when the sun goes down", and "a diary of dashed love and stubborn hope set into layers of melody that will never let the memory loose". Following its release, Childs was nominated for two Grammy Awards for 'Best New Artist' and for 'Best Rock Vocal Performance (Female)' for the single "Don't Walk Away".

== Track listing ==
All songs written by Toni Childs and David Ricketts except as indicated.

1. "Don't Walk Away" (Childs, Phil Ramacon) 4:00
2. "Walk and Talk Like Angels" 5:48
3. "Stop Your Fussin'" 4:40
4. "Dreamer" 5:01
5. "Let the Rain Come Down" (Childs, Ricketts, David Batteau) 4:51
6. "Zimbabwae" 6:18
7. "Hush" (Childs) 4:04
8. "Tin Drum" 5:41
9. "Where's the Ocean" (Childs) 4:42

== Personnel ==
- Toni Childs – vocals, guitar, bass
- David Ricketts – bass, guitar, keyboard, drum programs
- Rick Marotta – drums
- Alex Acuña – percussion
- Hans Christian – cello
- Paul Hanson – bassoon
- Gary Barlough – synthesizers, synclavier programs
- George Lee – saxophone, percussion
- Steve Hogarth – keyboards
- David Rhodes – guitar
- Alex Weir – guitar
- Dann Huff – guitar
- Gary Barnacle, Pete Thoms, John Thirkell – horns

== Charts ==
=== Weekly charts ===
Chart (1988–1990)	Peak position
Australian Albums (ARIA)	8
Canada Top Albums/CDs (RPM)	82
German Albums (Offizielle Top 100)	19
New Zealand Albums (RMNZ)	1
Swedish Albums (Sverigetopplistan)	40
Swiss Albums (Schweizer Hitparade)	27
UK Albums (Official Charts)	73
US Billboard 200	63

=== Year-end charts ===
Chart (1988)	Position
Australian Albums (ARIA)	39
Chart (1989)	Position
Australian Albums (ARIA)	35
German Albums (Offizielle Top 100)	93
New Zealand Albums (RMNZ)	2

== Certifications ==
Region	Certification	Certified units/sales
Australia (ARIA)	2× Platinum	140,000^{^}
New Zealand (RMNZ)	Platinum	15,000^{^}
^{^} Shipments figures based on certification alone.
