= The Very Best of Toni Childs =

Greatest hits album by Toni Childs
- Released: September 1996
- Recorded: 1987–1995
- Genre: Pop rock
- Length: 60.51
- Language: English
- Label: Polydor/A&M Records

Toni Childs chronology
The Woman's Boat (1994)	The Very Best of Toni Childs (1996)	Toni Childs: Ultimate Collection (2000)

Professional ratings
Review scores
Source	Rating
Allmusic	4/5 stars

The Very Best of Toni Childs is the first greatest hits album by American singer-songwriter, Toni Childs. It was successful in Australia and New Zealand, peaking in the top 10 in both countries.

Childs' version of "Many Rivers to Cross" was featured prominently in television advertisements for the National Australia Bank at the time. The song was re-released in Australia and peaked at No.12.

== Track listing ==
No.	Title	Writer(s)	Length
1.	"Stop Your Fussin'"	Toni Childs, David Ricketts	4:41
2.	"Zimbabwe"	Toni Childs, David Ricketts	6:19
3.	"I've Got to Go Now"	Toni Childs, David Ricketts	6:26
4.	"I Want to Walk With You"	Toni Childs, David Ricketts	5:03
5.	"House of Hope"	Toni Childs, David Ricketts	4:54
6.	"Many Rivers to Cross"	Jimmy Cliff	5:27
7.	"Don't Walk Away"	Toni Childs, Phil Ramacon	4:00
8.	"Let the Rain Come Down"	Toni Childs, David Ricketts	4:50
9.	"Walk and Talk Like Angels"	Toni Childs, David Ricketts	5:49
10.	"The Dead Are Dancing"	Toni Childs, David Ricketts	4:32
11.	"Where's the Ocean"	Toni Childs	4:44
12.	"Fell from a Great Height (featuring Stephen Cummings)"	Stephen Cummings, Bill McDonald	4:06
Total length:			60:51

== Charts ==
The Very Best of Toni Childs debuted at No.20 in Australia before peaking at No.1 for 6 weeks.

=== Weekly charts ===
Chart (1996)	Peak position
Australian Albums (ARIA)	1
New Zealand Albums (RMNZ)	8

=== Year-end charts ===
Chart (1996)	Position
Australian Albums (ARIA)	5

== Certifications and sales ==
Region	Certification	Certified units/sales
Australia (ARIA)	6× Platinum	420,000^{^}
New Zealand (RMNZ)	Gold	7,500^{^}
^{^} Shipments figures based on certification alone.

== See also ==
List of number-one albums in Australia during the 1990s
