= Bedtime Stories (David Baerwald album) =

Studio album by David Baerwald
- Released: May 1990
- Studio: Ocean Way Recording, Hollywood; Skyline Recording, Topanga; Studio 55, Hollywood; Avatar Studios, Malibu; Kiva West, Encino; One On One Studios, North Hollywood; Sound Factory, Hollywood; Soundcastle, Santa Monica; Abdullah's Mosque of Music; Ground Control Studios, Burbank
- Genre: Rock, pop
- Length: 55:18
- Label: A&M Records
- Producer: David Baerwald, Larry Klein, Steve Berlin, Matt Wallace

David Baerwald chronology
Boomtown (1986)	Bedtime Stories (1990)	Triage (1992)

Bedtime Stories is the first solo album by David Baerwald, an Ohio-born musician, singer, and composer who was formerly a member of the successful duo David + David along with David Ricketts.

Bedtime Stories was released in May 1990 on the A&M Records label, and was produced by Baerwald along with Larry Klein, Steve Berlin, and Matt Wallace.

== Critical reception ==
On Allmusic.com, "Bedtime Stories" rates 4.5 out of 5 stars, and is described as "a bracing collection that shines a light on desperate situations and characters with great dignity and musicianship."

== Track listing ==
All tracks are written by David Baerwald, with additional writers noted.

No.	Title	Writer(s)	Length
1.	"All for You"		5:57
2.	"Good Times"	Larry Klein	5:04
3.	"Dance"	Klein	4:14
4.	"Hello Mary"		5:10
5.	"The Best Inside You"	Klein	3:48
6.	"Young Anymore"	Klein	3:42
7.	"Sirens in the City"	David Ricketts	5:01
8.	"Liberty Lies"	Klein	5:22
9.	"Walk Through Fire"	Ricketts	5:08
10.	"Collette"	Steve Berlin, Matt Wallace	3:43
11.	"In the Morning"	Klein	4:11
12.	"Stranger"		3:55
Total length:			55:18

== Personnel ==
=== Musicians ===
- David Baerwald – vocals (all tracks), guitar (1–11), keyboards (1–5, 7, 9, 10, 12), lap steel guitar (3), bass (10), mandolin (10, 12), cümbüş (10)
- Larry Klein – bass (1–9, 11, 12), guitar (2, 3, 5–8, 11), keyboards (1–9, 11, 12)
- Rich Stekol – acoustic guitar (1, 4, 12)
- Greg Leisz – steel guitar (1, 4)
- Mike Urbano – drums (1, 10)
- Vinnie Colaiuta – drums (2–9, 11)
- Stephen Kupka – baritone saxophone (3)
- Emilio Castillo – tenor saxophone (3)
- Steve Grove – tenor saxophone (3)
- Lee Thornburg – trumpet (3)
- Greg Adams – trumpet, horn arrangements (3)
- Gene Elders – violin (4, 10)
- Steve Lindsey – Hammond organ (5, 6)
- Maxine Waters – vocals (5)
- Bill Dillon – guitar (7)
- Joni Mitchell – background vocals (8)
- Tommy Funderburk – background vocals (9)
- Steve Berlin – saxophone (10)

=== Technical ===
- Produced by David Baerwald (1, 4, 10, 12), Larry Klein (2, 3, 5–8, 9, 11), Matt Wallace (1, 4, 10, 12), Steve Berlin (1, 4, 10, 12)
- Engineers – Dan Marnien (2, 3, 5–9, 11), Matt Wallace (1, 4, 10, 12), Paul Ericksen (8), Steve Churchyard (2, 3, 5–9, 11)
- Additional engineer – Mark Linett
- Mixed by Larry Klein and Tony Phillips
- Mastered by Bob Ludwig at Masterdisk, Peekskill, NY
