= Triage (David Baerwald album) =

Studio album by David Baerwald
- Released: 1993
- Studios: Toad Hall, Pasadena
- Genres: Rock, pop rock
- Length: 51:57
- Label: A&M
- Producers: Bill Bottrell, David Baerwald, Dan Schwartz

David Baerwald chronology
Bedtime Stories (1990)	Triage (1993)	A Fine Mess (1999)

Triage is the second solo album by David Baerwald, formerly of the two-man group David & David. It was released in 1993 on A&M Records. Baerwald had wanted the album to come out before the 1992 United States presidential election, but it was pushed back several months.

Baerwald supported the album by participating in the "In Their Own Words" tour, along with Lisa Germano, Freedy Johnston, Johnny Clegg, and Michael Barabas.

== Production ==
The album was produced by Bill Bottrell, Baerwald, and Dan Schwartz. Baerwald was open to different musical styles and tried not to limit the music to any specific genre. Many of its songs were influenced by politics and conspiracy theories. The album is dedicated to politicians and government officials disliked by Baerwald. The album cover is a photograph of bloody hands on top of the American flag; the liner notes contain photos of the FBI file on Baerwald's father.

Herb Alpert played trumpet on "A Secret Silken World"; due to its theme of sadism, Joni Mitchell allegedly counseled against recording the song. "Nobody" was written after Baerwald tagged along with members of the LAPD gang division. "A Bitter Tree" addresses adultery. The voices of Jim Jones and George Herbert Walker Bush are sampled on "The Postman". The closing two songs incorporate more optimistic sentiments.

== Critical reception ==
Professional ratings
Review scores
Source	Rating
Calgary Herald	B+
Chicago Sun-Times	3/4 stars
Chicago Tribune	3/4 stars
Los Angeles Times	2.5/4 stars
USA Today	2.5/4 stars
The Virginian-Pilot	4/5 stars

The New York Times wrote that the album "leavens its juicy dollops of depravity and paranoia with just enough humor to keep from being an apocalyptic bore." The Calgary Herald noted that Baerwald's "voice—singing, mumbling and shouting those powerful lyrics—carries Triage, with the music pushed down to a subtle supporting role."

The Chicago Tribune concluded that "it's an ambitious work, but heavy-handedness has often been Baerwald's bane." The Los Angeles Times opined that, "like Roger Waters' recent work, Baerwald's well-crafted sonics fail to clothe his ambitious lyrical ideas in sufficient pop appeal." The Philadelphia Inquirer considered Triage to be "ponderous, self-obsessed singer-songwriter indulgence."

AllMusic rated Triage 4.5 out of 5 stars, deeming it "a bumpy ride."

== Track listing ==
All tracks are written by David Baerwald, with additional writers noted.

No.	Title	Writer(s)	Length
1.	"A Secret Silken World"	David Ricketts	7:42
2.	"The Got No Shotgun HydraHead Octopus Blues"		4:27
3.	"Nobody"	Bill Bottrell	4:33
4.	"The Waiter"	Bottrell	5:03
5.	"AIDS & Armageddon"		5:33
6.	"The Postman"		5:33
7.	"A Bitter Tree"		3:28
8.	"China Lake"	Ricketts	4:37
9.	"A Brand New Morning"		4:39
10.	"Born for Love"		6:22
Total length:			51:57

== Personnel ==
- David Baerwald – vocals, guitars, bass, keyboards, organ
- Bill Bottrell – guitars, keyboards, loops, vocals
- Greg Arreguin – guitar
- Dan Schwartz – bass, guitar
- David Kemper – drums
- Brian MacLeod – drums
- Kevin Gilbert – piano, drums
- Herb Alpert – trumpet (1)

Technical

- Produced by Bill Bottrell; David Baerwald and Dan Schwartz (1, 3, 6)
- Mixed by Bill Bottrell
- Engineered by Jerry Jordan, Julie Last, Blair Lamb, Lotti Kierkegaard, and Dan Schwartz
- Mastered by Bernie Grundman at Bernie Grundman Mastering, Los Angeles, California
- Production coordinator – Ivy Skoff
- Photography – Dennis Keeley
- Art direction and design – Rowan Moore
