= Toni Childs =

American-Australian singer-songwriter (born 1957)

- Born: October 29, 1957 (age 68); Orange, California, U.S.
- Genres: Rock, pop, world music
- Occupations: Musician, singer, songwriter
- Instruments: Vocals, guitar
- Years active: 1979–present
- Labels: A&M, DGC, 429 Records

Toni Childs (born October 29, 1957) is an American-born, Australian singer-songwriter.

== Early life ==
Childs was born in Orange, California, and lived in Arkansas, Kansas, Oklahoma and Nevada during her childhood. Raised in a household dominated by her parents' religious values, Childs stated in a 1988 article for Time magazine that she and her three brothers "were not allowed to listen to pop music or rock or even go to the movies. There was a lot I missed out on." At the age of 15, Childs ran away from home and became a blues musician. In 1972, she saw Pink Floyd in concert and decided to pursue a career as a singer-songwriter.

== Career ==
=== 1979–1987: Early years ===
In 1979, Childs performed several live shows with the band Berlin whilst their singer, Terri Nunn, was unavailable. Her first band of note, Toni and the Movers, included Jack Sherman (later to become a member of the Red Hot Chili Peppers) and Micki Steele (later a member of the Bangles). The Los Angeles-based band performed and toured for two years but did not release an album. In the summer of 1981, after The Movers had disbanded, Childs performed various improvised sets of music at Madame Wong's West and the Madam Wong's clubs in Los Angeles under the name Nadia Kapiche with musicians including Steve Schiff (guitar), Micki Steele (bass), Mark Buchholtz (keyboards/sax), Richard Larsen (keyboards/sax), and drummer Stan Getts. Demo (recording) sessions were also done in Hollywood with most of this band, with Ed Warnecke on drums. Childs was still searching for her niche. She has said, "I didn't know who I was, and I realized I was trying to grab the brass ring like everybody else. I wanted to become a better songwriter and I knew I just didn't know enough to be signed. That's when I went to Island Music publishing, and asked them to sign me and send me to England."

In 1981, she signed a song publishing deal with Island Music which financed her move to London. There she lived in an empty office of a local recording studio, sweeping floors and dusting consoles in exchange for rent and recording experience. While in London, Childs played with various musicians in various band configurations: David Rhodes (who had worked with Peter Gabriel), Mike Cotzi (Shriekback), Martin Swaine (The Waterboys, World Party), Steve Creese (World Party), and Duncan Kilburn (The Psychedelic Furs). During her stay in the vitally global music scene of early-80s London, the seeds of world music were planted, later to be heard on Childs's first album. In 1983, Childs provided backing vocals on Scottish band the Europeans' track "A.E.I.O.U". Band member Steve Hogarth later returned the favor by doing the same on Childs's debut album Union.

In 1985, after returning to Los Angeles, Childs was signed to A&M Records and soon began to work with songwriter/producer/musician David Ricketts (of David + David) on the soundtrack for the film Echo Park, also providing backing vocals for David + David's album Boomtown, including on the minor hit single, "Ain't So Easy".

=== 1989–1990: Union ===
In 1988, Childs's debut album Union was released. Recorded in London, Paris and Swaziland, the album was an infusion of rock/pop and world music with its strong African percussion. The album garnered considerable critical acclaim, and though it peaked at No. 63 in the U.S., it was certified gold in 1995 by the Record Industry Association of America (RIAA) for having shipped 500,000 units (the album had shipped 180,000 copies between 1991 and 2006, 1991 being when SoundScan began tracking sales). It also enjoyed two weeks at No. 1 in New Zealand and was certified platinum there. In Australia, the album was certified double platinum, for shipments exceeding 140,000 copies. Later that year, Childs was nominated for two Grammy Awards – Best New Artist and Best Rock Vocal Performance (female). Her first national tour was opening for Bob Dylan. The single "Stop Your Fussin'" was a major single hit in various countries, including South Africa where it was named the seventh-biggest-selling single of 1989.

As with all of her albums, Childs wrote or co-wrote all the tracks for Union. She embarked on a relationship with her Union collaborator David Ricketts, living and working together, and the songs on Union have much to do with their relationship. In a 1988 article that praised Childs's originality and the craftsmanship of Union, Time magazine said, "if she can get an album like Union from a single relationship, the music she makes from the rest of her life should really be extraordinary". Music videos were produced for the songs "Don't Walk Away", "Stop Your Fussin'", and "Walk And Talk Like Angels". These were made available on the VHS "Toni Childs: The Videos". The song "Dreamer" was included in the soundtrack to the film "Moonlight and Valentino" soundtrack.

In 1989, Childs recorded a cover version of Jimmy Cliff's "Many Rivers to Cross" as part of the soundtrack for the film Lost Angels. In 1990, Childs recorded vocals for the song "I've Not Forgotten You" for the Jonathan Elias album Requiem for the America: Songs from the Lost World.

=== 1991–1993: House of Hope ===
Childs’ second album House of Hope yielded huge success in Australia and New Zealand with "I've Got to Go Now". According to Soundscan, House of Hope had sold 203,000 units in the U.S. since its release in 1991 up to 2006. The title track was featured on the "Thelma & Louise" soundtrack, and instrumental excerpts from "Heaven's Gate" have been used in American television shows. The album covered some rather dark ground—such as domestic abuse in "I've Got to Go Now", world troubles in "House of Hope", incest and sexual abuse in the harrowing "Daddy's Song", addiction in "Where's the Light" and "Put This Fire Out", and death in "Heaven's Gate", "Dead Are Dancing", and "Three Days". Of the album, Childs stated she believed that "when we have the courage to share our darkest parts and our purest nature with each other we are evolution in action. We are creating our own 'House of Hope'". Like its predecessor, it achieved platinum status in New Zealand, and was certified double platinum in Australia. Music videos were produced for the songs "I've Got To Go Now" and "Heaven's Gate".

=== 1994–1997: The Woman's Boat and The Very Best of ===
Following her departure from A&M, Childs was signed by Geffen Records. She then released her third album, The Woman's Boat, in 1994. The album's emphasis on femininity and womanhood was framed by the opening track "Womb" and the closing track "Death". Cameos on the album from Peter Gabriel, Robert Fripp, and Zap Mama echoed the world beat of her earlier albums. The Woman's Boat featured more programming and computer-based textures than the previous two albums, notably "Welcome to the World" and the single "Lay Down Your Pain", and it contains some darker tracks such as "Predator" and "I Just Want Affection", mixed with mellow highlights "Long Time Coming" and "I Met a Man" (featuring Peter Gabriel). While the album did not elicit a lot of reviewer response, Q magazine described it as "epic" in its scope. Although she was nominated for another Grammy Award for Best Female Rock Performance, the album sold poorly because Gary Gersh her original A&R man left Geffen to become head of Capitol Records and hire her then manager Perry Watts-Russell to head Capitol's A&R, and Childs was again left without a record label. According to Soundscan, The Woman's Boat has sold 66,000 units in the U.S. since its release in 1994 up until 2006. A music video was produced for the song "Welcome To The World".

In 1995, Childs was featured on the soundtrack to the film Boys on the Side singing a cover of Al Green's "Take Me to the River", although the song was not included on the soundtrack album and has never been commercially released.

In 1996, The Very Best of Toni Childs was released, becoming the fifth-biggest-selling album of 1996 in Australia on the back of the re-release of her cover of Jimmy Cliff's "Many Rivers to Cross", which she recorded in 1989. The "Best of" collection also became her third top-10 album in New Zealand, and was certified six times platinum in Australia. Her version of Many Rivers to Cross was featured prominently in television advertisements for the National Australia Bank at the time.

She retired from touring in 1997 after developing Graves' disease and starting the "Dream a Dolphin" charity.

=== 2003–present: "Because You're Beautiful" and Keep the Faith ===
Eve Ensler, the founder of V-Day, met Childs in early 2003 when Childs was performing in a production of Ensler's The Vagina Monologues in Kauai, Hawaii. Ensler was already a fan of Childs's music, which she claims had a profound impact on her and had been a lifeline. Ensler asked Childs to write an anthem for her documentary V-Day: Until the Violence Stops. Childs wrote and released a song entitled "Because You're Beautiful", which was awarded the 2004 Emmy Award for Outstanding Original Music and Lyrics.

Childs resided in Hawaii where she made a recovery from Graves' disease and slowly re-entered into performing live and recording. At a surprise appearance in October 2006, Childs took the stage at Darcy's Pub in Victoria, British Columbia, at an "open mic" night.

She has recorded an album entitled Keep the Faith, which has seen her once again team with David Ricketts who collaborated with her on her debut album 20 years earlier. The album drew heavily from material Childs wrote in the mid–1990s and she has stated that Keep the Faith is "an apt title given personal and world events". It consists of eleven new songs and the track "Because You're Beautiful". Originally available direct from the artist, Keep the Faith is distributed on general release in the United States by 429 Records (part of the Savoy group of record companies) as of January 2009. It is also available in New Zealand, distributed by MGM Distribution Pty Ltd. The album was released in Australia in August 2008, featuring first single "One Life". Childs performed a concert tour of the country in September 2008 and again there (with Jackson Browne) in February/March 2009.

== Personal life ==
In 2013, she contributed a foreword to 101 Vagina, a crowd-funded book published in Melbourne and designed to challenge taboos about the female body.

Childs became an Australian citizen in March 2022.

== Discography ==
=== Albums ===
Title	Album details	Peak chart positions									Certifications
Title	Album details	AUS	AUT	GER	NOR	NZ	SWE	SWI	UK	US	Certifications
Union	Released: 1988; Label: A&M Records	8	—	19	—	1	40	27	73	63	AUS: 2× Platinum; NZ: Platinum
House of Hope	Released: 1991; Label: A&M Records	4	31	—	8	5	—	31	—	115	AUS: 2× Platinum; NZ: Gold
The Woman's Boat	Released: 1994; Label: DGC Records/ Geffen	24	—	—	—	32	—	—	—	—	
Keep the Faith	Released: August 2008; Label: 429 Records / SLG	150	—	—	—	—	—	—	—	—	
Citizens of the Planet	Released: 2014; Label: Big Mother Records	—	—	—	—	—	—	—	—	—	
It's All a Beautiful Noise	Released: 2015; Label: Big Mother Records	—	—	—	—	—	—	—	—	—	
"—" denotes a recording that did not chart or was not released in that territory.

=== Compilation albums ===
Title	Album details	Peak chart positions		Certifications
Title	Album details	AUS	NZ	Certifications
The Very Best of Toni Childs	Released: 1996; Label: Polydor/A&M Records	1	8	ARIA: 6× Platinum; NZ: Gold
Toni Childs: Ultimate Collection	Released: 2000; Label: Hip-O Records	—	—	
The Vault	Released: 2018; Label: Big Mother Entertainment	—	—	

=== Singles ===
Year	Title	Chart positions									Certifications	Album
Year	Title	AUS	AUT	GER	NLD	NZ	UK	US	US Mod	US Dance	Certifications	Album
1988	"Stop Your Fussin'"	17	30	17	45	5	95	—	—	—		Union
1988	"Don't Walk Away"	17	—	40	55	12	53	72	17	—		Union
1988	"Walk and Talk Like Angels"	70	—	—	—	—	—	—	—	—		Union
1989	"Zimbabwae"	74	7	—	—	31	—	—	—	—		Union
1989	"Many Rivers to Cross"	99	—	—	—	29	—	—	—	—		Lost Angels soundtrack
1991	"I've Got to Go Now"	5	—	78	—	19	—	—	—	—	AUS: Gold	House of Hope
1991	"House of Hope"	39	—	—	—	27	—	—	—	—		House of Hope
1992	"I Want to Walk with You"	110	—	—	—	—	—	—	—	—		House of Hope
1992	"Heaven's Gate"	—	—	—	—	—	—	—	—	—		House of Hope
1994	"Lay Down Your Pain"	193	—	—	—	—	92	—	—	13		The Woman's Boat
1995	"Fell from a Great Height" (Stephen Cummings + Toni Childs)	147	—	—	—	—	—	—	—	—		Falling Swinger (Stephen Cummings album)
1996	"Many Rivers to Cross" (re-issue)	12	—	—	—	—	—	—	—	—		The Very Best of Toni Childs
2004	"Because You're Beautiful"	—	—	—	—	—	—	—	—	—		non-album release
2008	"One Life"	—	—	—	—	—	—	—	—	—		Keep the Faith
2009	"Because You're Beautiful" (re-issue)	—	—	—	—	—	—	—	—	—		Keep the Faith
"—" denotes a recording that did not chart or was not released in that territory.
