= Abby Epstein =

American film director

Abby Epstein is a film director and producer most known for working in the field of the documentary. Her film The Business of Being Born, which deals with the birth process in American hospitals, is one of her most widely known and acclaimed films.

== Life and career ==
Abby Epstein started her career as a theatre director having her own production company, Roadworks Productions, which is based in Chicago. Roadworks Productions was founded in 1992, and the company had seen much success in the mid 1990s. After directing a few productions in Chicago, Abby moved to New York to be an assistant director on the production of Rent. She then worked on The Vagina Monologues with Eve Ensler.

Epstein directed her first documentary Until the Violence Stops, a film about the impact of The Vagina Monologues on a global scale. Five years after releasing Until the Violence Stops, Abby Epstein released The Business of Being Born in 2008. She is currently working on her third film, Sweetening the Pill, a film that aims to address the side effects of taking the birth control pill.

Much of Abby Epstein's film career deals with birth and sex. Her film Until the Violence Stops premiered at the Sundance Film Festival in 2004 and won an Emmy after its screening on Lifetime. The Business of Being Born debuted at the Tribeca Film Festival in 2007 and released theatrically in 2008.

In October 2018, Epstein released Weed the People, a documentary about infants with pediatric cancer, that she worked on for 6 years with Ricki Lake as an executive producer. The film studies the effects of a lack of cannabis legalization in the US, and follows the parents of sick children trying to get access. It makes the case for increasing the amount of research into medical marijuana and making it easier for patients who get relief from medical applications of cannabis.

== Filmography ==
Production	Year	Role
Until the Violence Stops	2003	Director
The Business of Being Born	2008	Director, Producer
Breastmilk	2014	Producer
The Mama Sherpas	2015	Producer
Weed The People	2018	Director
