= Ed Greene =

American drummer

Ed Greene is an American drummer and session musician.

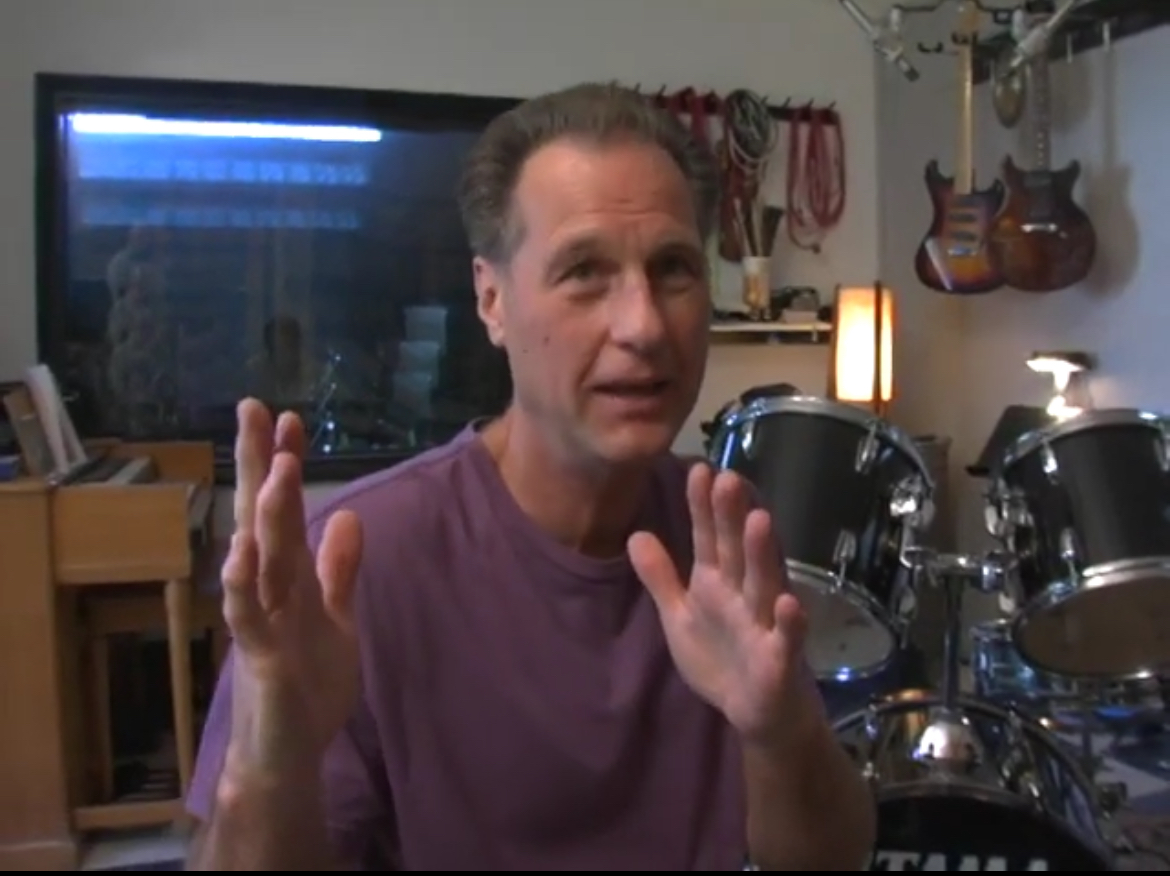
Greene in 2011

In 1971 he recorded with Donald Byrd (Ethiopian Knights, 1972), together with Thurman Green, Harold Land, Bobby Hutcherson, Joe Sample, Bobbye Porter Hall, David T. Walker, and Wilton Felder, among others.

Greene has also recorded with Barry White, Stanley Turrentine, B.B. King, Ramsey Lewis, Dizzy Gillespie, Steely Dan, Bobby "Blue" Bland, Phoebe Snow, Diana Ross and Marvin Gaye, among others.

Greene was Barry White's drummer on recording sessions, and he played on almost all of White's biggest hits, including Love Unlimited Orchestra's Love's Theme Theme and his 1973 hit "I'm Gonna Love You Just a Little More Baby".

== Partial discography ==
- 1972: Ethiopian Knights – Donald Byrd
- 1974: Dreamer – Bobby Blue Bland
- 1974: Pieces of Dreams – Stanley Turrentine
- 1975: Love Will Keep Us Together – Captain & Tennille
- 1976: First Course – Lee Ritenour
- 1976: American Pastime – Three Dog Night
- 1976: Dee Dee Bridgewater – Dee Dee Bridgewater
- 1976: Wired – Jeff Beck
- 1977: Free Ride – Dizzy Gillespie
- 1977: Baby It's Me – Diana Ross
- 1977: Introducing Sparks – Sparks
- 1977: Aja – Steely Dan
- 1978: Dane Donohue – Dane Donohue
- 1978: That's What Friends Are For – Johnny Mathis and Deniece Williams
- 1978: Destiny – The Jacksons
- 1979: When Love Comes Calling – Deniece Williams
- 1980: Endangered Species – Klaatu
- 1980: Man's Best Friend – Livingston Taylor
- 1980: Nothin' Matters and What If It Did – John Mellencamp
- 1981: Being with You (Album) – Smokey Robinson
- 1982: The Nightfly – Donald Fagen
- 1986: Boomtown – David & David
- 1993: Love Makes No Sense – Alexander O'Neal
- 1994: Blue Night – Percy Sledge
- 1999: Living Without Your Love – Dusty Springfield
- 2004: Shining Through The Rain – Percy Sledge
- 2006: (Nashville session for Lonnie Lee, with Bob Babbitt and Wayne Jackson)
