= V-Day: Until the Violence Stops =

- DVD cover
- Directed by: Abby Epstein
- Written by: Eve Ensler
- Produced by: Vincent Farrell
- Cinematography: Cindy Gantz; Paul Mailman; Paulo Netto
- Edited by: Lisa Palattella
- Music by: Rick Baitz
- Distributed by: Lifetime Television
- Release date: February 1, 2003
- Running time: 73 minutes
- Country: United States
- Language: English

V-Day: Until the Violence Stops (also known as World VDAY) is a 2003 American documentary film directed by Abby Epstein. It follows events marking 2002 V-Day — a grassroots movement inspired by Eve Ensler's 1996 play The Vagina Monologues. The film focuses on V-Day activities in the United States, Kenya, Croatia and the Philippines.

== Cast ==
- Tantoo Cardinal as herself
- Rosario Dawson as herself
- Eve Ensler as herself
- Jane Fonda as herself
- Lisa Gay Hamilton as herself
- Salma Hayek as herself
- Amy Hill as herself
- Rosie Perez as herself
- Isabella Rossellini as herself

== Release and reception ==
V-Day: Until the Violence Stops was screened at the Sundance Film Festival before being shown on Lifetime Television in 2004. In 2004, Toni Childs, David Ricketts and Eddy Free won an Emmy Award for Outstanding Music and Lyrics for the song "Because You Are Beautiful".

== See also ==
- The UK organisation of the VDay campaign was known as Until the Violence Stops, but is now known as Tender.
