= Stop Your Fussin' =

1988 single by Toni Childs

Single by Toni Childs

from the album Union
- B-side: "Where's the Ocean"
- Released: July 21, 1988
- Studio: Los Angeles, London, Paris, Swaziland
- Length: 4:38 (album version); 4:05 (7-inch edit)
- Label: A&M
- Songwriters: Toni Childs; David Ricketts
- Producers: David Tickle; David Ricketts; Toni Childs

Toni Childs singles chronology
"Stop Your Fussin'" (1988)	"Don't Walk Away" (1988)

Music video
- "Stop Your Fussin'" on YouTube

"Stop Your Fussin'" is a song by American-Australian singer-songwriter Toni Childs from her first studio album, Union (1988). Childs wrote the song with David Ricketts, and they both co-produced the track with David Tickle. The song was first released in Japan in July 1988 as Child's debut single and was later issued in Australia, Europe, and the United States; in the US, it served as Childs' second single, after "Don't Walk Away". "Stop Your Fussin'" became a top-five hit in New Zealand and South Africa while reaching the top 20 in Australia and Germany. The song's music video, directed by Michael Patterson and Candace Reckinger, shows Childs singing the song on a tropical beach.

== Background ==
After Toni Childs' former band, Toni & the Movers, split up in 1981, she moved to England, then returned to the United States five years later, meeting record producer David Ricketts in Los Angeles and helping him compose the soundtrack to the 1986 comedy-drama film Echo Park. Once Childs signed with A&M Records, she and Ricketts asked David Tickle to help produce Childs' first solo studio album, Union. Childs recorded several tracks in Los Angeles, traveled to London and Paris to record overdubs, then went to Swaziland to finish the album, on which "Stop Your Fussin'" appears as the third track. "Stop Your Fussin'" was written by Childs and Rickett, who both produced it alongside Tickle. The track is a Caribbean-flavored song with reggae and pop influences. Its lyrics are sung from the perspective of a woman who is lecturing her agitated partner. The album version of the track is four minutes and 38 seconds long.

== Release and reception ==
"Stop Your Fussin'" was first released in Japan on July 21, 1988, as a mini-CD single. The same month, the song made its first chart appearance in the Netherlands, peaking at number 31 on the Dutch Top 40 and number 45 on the Single Top 100. In early September, the song debuted within the top 50 of Australia's ARIA Singles Chart, eventually climbing to a peak of number 17, where it spent five nonconsecutive weeks in October, November, and December; it remained in the top 50 for 19 weeks. On South Africa's Springbok Radio chart, the single debuted in early October 1988 and peaked at number four, spending 19 weeks in the top 20. In West Germany, the song reached number 17 in November and spent 17 weeks inside the top 100, while in Austria, it charted for two weeks, peaking at number 31. During this period, it reached its peak on number 64 on the Eurochart Hot 100.

"Stop Your Fussin'" also charted in New Zealand, where it peaked at number five on 6 November 1988 and logged 11 nonconsecutive weeks on the RIANZ Singles Chart. In the United States, the single was released on October 12, 1988, but did not appear on any Billboard charts. On May 8, 1989, the single was released in the United Kingdom. Two weeks later, on May 21, it debuted at number 95 on the UK Singles Chart, dropping out of the top 100 the following week, making it Childs' lowest-charting UK single. In Australia, "Stop Your Fussin'", along with Childs' other songs "Don't Walk Away" and "I've Got to Go Now", served as anthems for female empowerment.

== Music video ==
Michael Patterson and Candace Reckinger directed the music video for "Stop Your Fussin'", which was produced by Sharon Oreck. It was filmed in Los Angeles and features Childs singing the song on a tropical beach. The video began receiving airplay on MTV and VH1 in June 1988, several months before it was released as a single in the US. In late October, following the single's official release, the video was re-added to MTV.

== Track listings ==
Non-UK 7-inch, US cassette, and Japanese mini-CD single

1. "Stop Your Fussin'" (edit) – 4:05
2. "Where's the Ocean" – 4:41

German 12-inch and maxi-CD single

1. "Stop Your Fussin'" (edit) – 4:05
2. "Where's the Ocean" – 4:41
3. "Walk and Talk Like Angels" – 5:46

European mini maxi-CD single and UK 12-inch single

1. "Stop Your Fussin'" – 4:05
2. "Dreamer" – 5:01
3. "Tin Drum" – 5:40

UK 7-inch single

A. "Stop Your Fussin'"
B. "Dreamer"

== Charts ==
Weekly chart performance for "Stop Your Fussin'"
Chart (1988–1989)	Peak position
Australia (ARIA)	17
Austria (Ö3 Austria Top 40)	30
Europe (Eurochart Hot 100)	64
Italy Airplay (Music & Media)	4
Netherlands (Dutch Top 40)	31
Netherlands (Single Top 100)	45
New Zealand (Recorded Music NZ)	5
South Africa (Springbok Radio)	4
UK Singles (OCC)	95
West Germany (GfK)	17

== Release history ==
Release dates and formats for "Stop Your Fussin'"
Region	Date	Format(s)	Label(s)	Ref.
Japan	July 21, 1988	Mini-CD	A&M	
Europe	1988	7-inch vinyl; mini-CD	A&M	
Australia	1988	7-inch vinyl	A&M	
United States	October 12, 1988	7-inch vinyl; cassette	A&M	
United Kingdom	May 8, 1989	7-inch vinyl; 12-inch vinyl	A&M	
