= Brodmann =

Brodmann is a German surname. Notable people with the surname include:

- Ines Brodmann (born 1985), Swiss orienteer
- Korbinian Brodmann (1868–1918), German neurologist
- Mario Brodmann (born 1966), Swiss former ice hockey forward
- René Brodmann (1933–2000), Swiss football defender

== See also ==
- Brodmann area, a region in the brain cortex
- Michael L. Brodman, American gynecologist and obstetrician
