= Ricki Lake =

American television host and actress (born 1968)

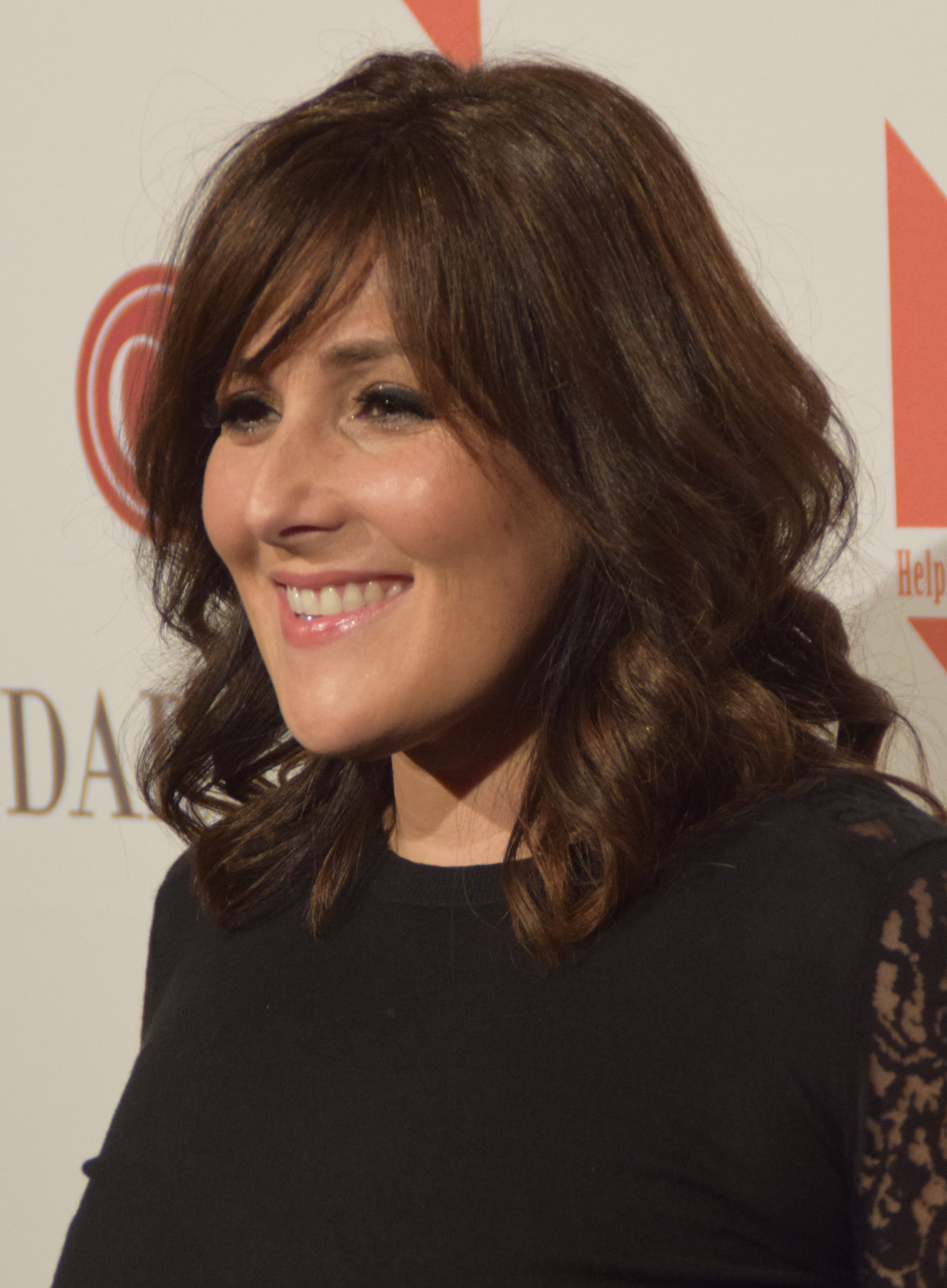
- Lake in May 2015
- Born: Ricki Lake; September 21, 1968 (age 58); Hastings-on-Hudson, New York, U.S.
- Education: Ithaca College (attended)
- Occupations: Television host; actress; producer
- Years active: 1987–present
- Known for: Tracy Turnblad – Hairspray; Ricki Lake; The Ricki Lake Show
- Spouses: Rob Sussman (m. 1994; div. 2004) Christian Evans (m. 2012; div. 2015) Ross Burningham (m. 2022)
- Children: 2

Ricki Pamela Lake (born September 21, 1968) is an American television host and actress. She is known for her lead role as Tracy Turnblad in the 1988 film Hairspray, for which she received a nomination for the Independent Spirit Award for Best Female Lead. She is also known for her talk show, Ricki Lake, which was broadcast internationally from September 1993 until May 2004. When the show debuted, Lake was 24 and credited as being the youngest person to host a syndicated talk show at the time. In late 2012, Lake began hosting a second syndicated talk show, The Ricki Lake Show. The series was canceled in 2013 after a single season, but Lake won her first Daytime Emmy Award for the project.

== Early life ==
Lake was born in Hastings-on-Hudson, New York, to a secular Jewish family. Her parents are Jill (a homemaker) and Barry Lake (a pharmacist), though Lake was largely brought up by her paternal grandmother, Sylvia Lake, until Sylvia's death in 1978.

Lake attended Ithaca College for one year.

== Career ==
=== Acting ===
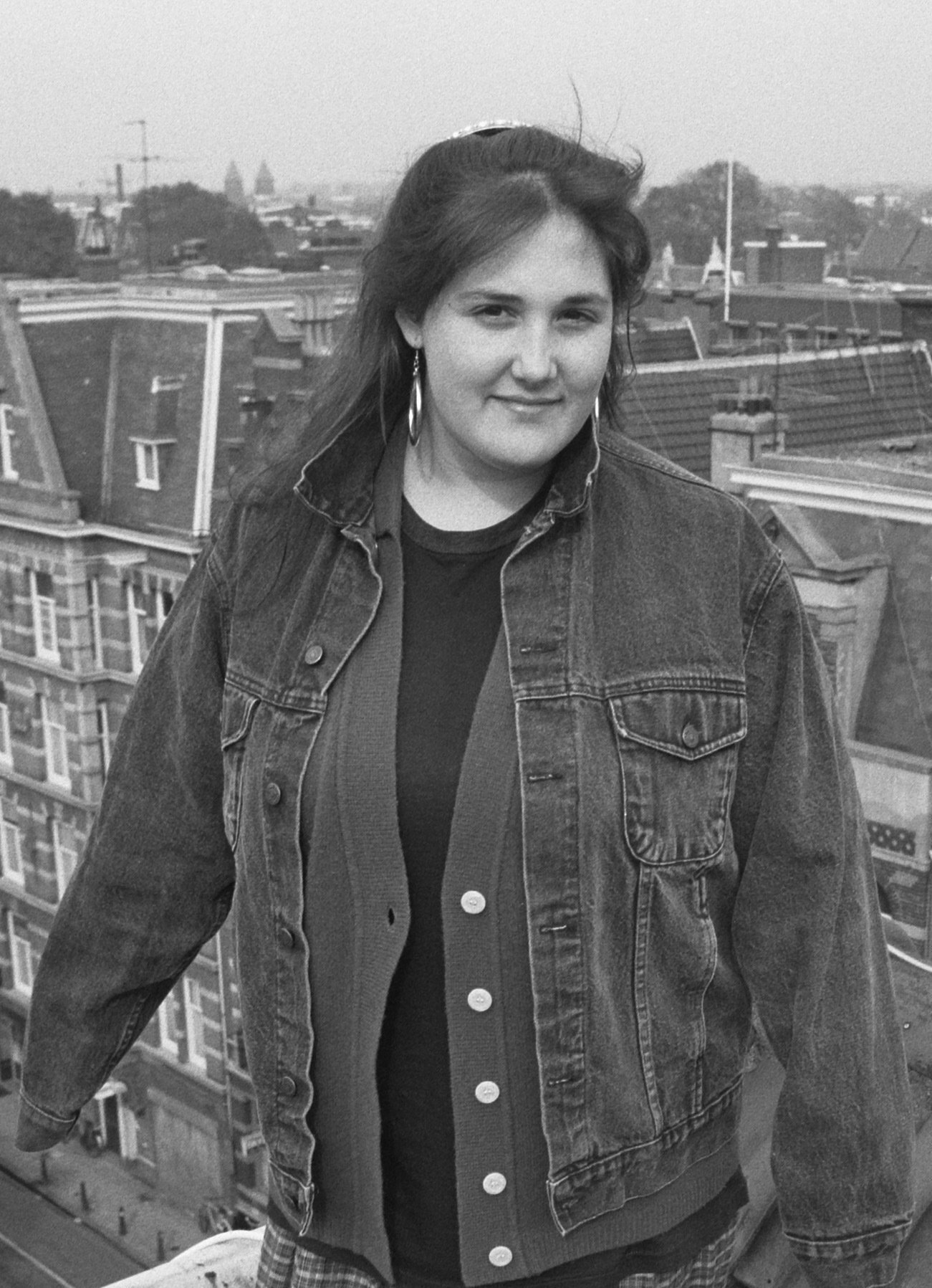
Lake in 1988

Lake made her film debut as Tracy Turnblad, the lead character in John Waters' 1988 cult classic Hairspray. Lake also starred in other Waters films including Cry-Baby (with Johnny Depp and Susan Tyrrell), Cecil B. Demented (with Melanie Griffith and Stephen Dorff), and Serial Mom (with Kathleen Turner and Sam Waterston). She starred in Mrs. Winterbourne with Shirley MacLaine and Brendan Fraser, Cabin Boy, Last Exit to Brooklyn, Cookie, and Inside Monkey Zetterland.

She joined the cast of the Vietnam War drama series China Beach as a Red Cross volunteer, Holly "the Donut Dolly" Pelegrino, for the show's third season. She also had a recurring role on the CBS sitcom The King of Queens as Doug's sister Stephanie. She guest-starred on television series including Drop Dead Diva and a voice role on King of the Hill, and starred in the television movie Baby Cakes. She had a cameo appearance in the 2007 remake of the original cult-classic Hairspray as a William Morris talent agent, and teamed up with star Nikki Blonsky (who played Tracy Turnblad in the 2007 movie musical remake) and Marissa Jaret Winokur (who played Tracy Turnblad in the Broadway musical based on the original 1988 film) to record "Mama I'm a Big Girl Now" for the soundtrack. The song is played during the film's end credits. She later reunited with original Hairspray co-star Debbie Harry for the film Hotel Gramercy Park, which was released in 2008.

=== Talk shows ===
Ricki Lake was Lake's first daytime talk show and at 25, she was the youngest person at the time to host one. The show specialized in topics involving invited guests and incorporated questions and comments from a studio audience.

The show debuted in syndication on September 13, 1993, and ended first-run episodes on May 25, 2004. In 2000, Lake told Rosie O'Donnell in an interview that she had signed on for four additional years. Although Sony Pictures Television had many stations contracted through the 2004–2005 season, Lake decided to end the show in August 2004, citing (among other things) a desire to spend time with her family. She moved from Los Angeles to New York to tape the 11th season of the show, then returned to California when taping was complete. Lake returned to the talk show platform when she hosted a revived version of her original talk show which premiered in September 2012 and was cancelled after one season. Lake's talk show often discussed controversial psychological topics, including those related to family dynamics and the impact of trauma on parent-child relationships.

=== 2006–2010: Other projects ===
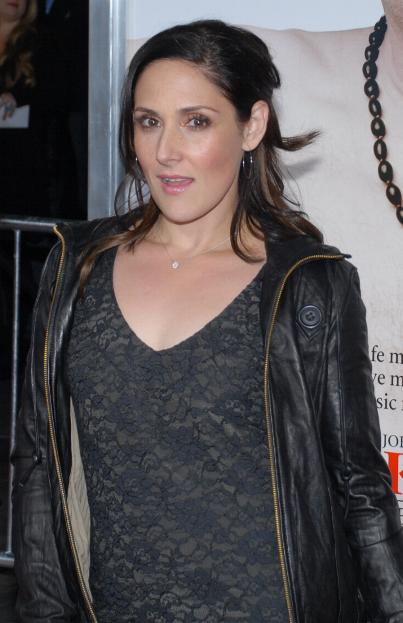
Lake at the 2007 premiere of Walk Hard: The Dewey Cox Story

After her talk show had wrapped production on its final season, Lake went on to host the 2006 CBS limited series Gameshow Marathon, which re-created classic game shows with celebrity contestants. She also signed a development deal with Gameshow Marathon production company FremantleMedia for other ventures, including creating and producing future programs and projects. In October 2007, Lake appeared in the Lifetime TV movie Matters of Life and Dating. Lake also had a cameo in the 2007 film Hairspray as a talent agent and also sang "Mama I'm A Big Girl Now" with Nikki Blonsky and Marissa Jaret Winokur for the film's end credits. The Business of Being Born, Lake's documentary about home birth and midwifery, was released in limited markets on January 18, 2008. The film premiered at the Tribeca Film Festival and Red Envelope released the film in New York, L.A. and San Francisco in October; it also screened in Australia.

The Business of Being Born included footage and details of Lake's own "life-changing" home-birthing experience and followed a midwife going about her work. Tribeca called it "The Inconvenient Truth of Childbirth". Lake described it as her life's work for the last three years and expressed hopes that the film educated and empowered people to really know their choices in childbirth. She performed in the CBS television special Loving Leah in January of that year. Lake also jointly wrote a book on the world of natural childbirth and birthing options, along with Abby Epstein and Jacques Moritz, Your Best Birth, which was published by Wellness Central on May 1, 2009. Lake and Epstein also launched MyBestBirth.com, an online social network, powered by Ning, intended to allow parents and medical professionals to dialogue about varying birthing options and resources. Lake returned to television on May 11, 2009, succeeding Sharon Osbourne as host for the third season of VH1's Charm School. On November 10, 2010, Lake joined fellow talkers Phil Donahue, Sally Jessy Raphael, Geraldo Rivera, and Montel Williams as guests of Oprah Winfrey on The Oprah Winfrey Show, marking the first time those hosts appeared together on one show since their respective programs left the air.

=== 2011–present ===
In March 2011, reports said that three television studios, Twentieth Television, Universal Media Studios and CBS Television Distribution, were interested in bringing Lake back to the talk-show realm in 2012. This was after Lake began appearing on various programs in which she expressed a desire to return to the genre. Lake competed on the 13th season of Dancing with the Stars. She was partnered with three-time champion Derek Hough and cited Kirstie Alley's appearance as an inspiration to do the show. Lake achieved tremendous success, consistently achieving high scores. After making the finals, Lake was announced as the contestant in third place, losing to television personality Rob Kardashian and actor and Army veteran J. R. Martinez, despite having higher scores than either.

On April 20, 2011, Lake signed with Twentieth Television to develop The Ricki Lake Show, which premiered in September 2012. The new program had a more Oprah-like format as compared to her earlier talk show. It was cancelled after one season. Lake won the Daytime Emmy for Outstanding Talk Show Host in 2013.

On December 7, 2016, Lake made a cameo in the television musical Hairspray Live! On February 11, 2017, Lake appeared as a guest judge on the British talent show Let It Shine with Gary Barlow, Dannii Minogue, and Martin Kemp on the BBC. On February 17, 2018, Lake appeared on the British television show Through the Keyhole hosted by Keith Lemon.

In March 2018, at SXSW, Lake and Epstein premiered their documentary film Weed the People, examining the use of cannabis as medicine and its status as a Schedule I prohibited drug in the United States. The film focused in particular on the use of cannabis in the treatment of pediatric cancer.

On February 6, 2019, she was revealed to be "Raven" in the Fox series The Masked Singer during its first season. She performed "Rainbow" by Kesha, "Bad Romance" by Lady Gaga and "Brave" by Sara Bareilles. In October 2019, she began competing in The X Factor: Celebrity.

On October 28, Lake made a guest appearance on the ITV Daytime program Loose Women. Lake was said to be a last minute addition to the panel with one of the original panellists off sick at short notice.

In 2022, Lake launched a podcast, Raised by Ricki, in collaboration with Lemonada Media. Lake and co-host Kalen Allen discuss previous episodes of Ricki Lake and interview celebrity guests.

== Dancing with the Stars performances ==
Week #	Dance/Song	Judges' scores			Result
Week #	Dance/Song	Inaba	Goodman	Tonioli	Result
1	Viennese Waltz/"This Year's Love"	7	6	7	Safe
2	Jive/"Hey Ya!"	8	7	8	Safe
3	Rumba/"Gravity"	9	9	9	Safe
4	Tango/"Theme from Psycho"	10	9	10	Safe
5	Foxtrot/"Easy Lover"	8	8	8	Safe
6	Quickstep/"Luck Be a Lady"; Group Broadway dance/"Big Spender" & "Money Money"	10; No	9 Scores	10; Given	Safe
7	Paso doble/"Sweet Dreams"; Team paso doble/"Bring Me to Life"	9; 9	9; 8	9; 9	Safe
8	Waltz/"You Make Me Feel"; Instant Jive/"Land of a Thousand Dances"	9; 8	9; 8	10; 8	Safe
9 Semi-finals	Samba/"Jump in the Line"; Argentine tango/"Allerdings"; Cha-cha-cha relay/"I Like How It Feels"	10; 9 Awarded	10; 10; 8	10; 10; Points	Safe
10; Finals	Cha-cha-cha/"Yeah 3x" Freestyle/"Can't Touch It"; Tango/Theme from Psycho	9; 9 Awarded	9; 9; 30	9; 9 Points	Third Place

== Personal life ==
Lake has discussed drastic weight changes in interviews, including swings of up to 100 pounds and extreme diets that left her "fainting on, like, the spot. I'd be standing up and then black out and not remember anything."

Lake met illustrator Rob Sussman in October 1993, on Halloween. The couple married in Las Vegas on March 26, 1994. They have two sons: Milo Sebastian Sussman (born 1997), and Owen Tyler Sussman, whose water birth, in 2001, was shown in The Business of Being Born, which Lake also produced. The couple filed for divorce in August 2003; it was finalized on February 25, 2004.

In November 1994, Lake was arrested for staging an anti-fur demonstration against Karl Lagerfeld. Lake was charged with trespassing and criminal mischief; however, she ultimately pleaded guilty to an amended charge of disorderly conduct.

Lake began dating jewelry designer Christian Evans in mid-2009. They became engaged in August 2011, and married on April 8, 2012. On October 29, 2014, Lake filed for divorce from Evans, citing "irreconcilable differences". In December 2014, however, they announced they had put their divorce on hold; it was finalized in 2015. Evans, who suffered from bipolar disorder, died by suicide in 2017.

On September 18, 2010, Lake's rented Malibu home was destroyed by a fire. She and her sons escaped without injury.

On January 15, 2011, Lake finished in sixth place in the PokerStars Caribbean Adventure Luxury Ladies Poker Event, collecting $5,587 of the prize pool.

On January 1, 2020, Lake posted a picture on her social media accounts, in which she revealed that she had been dealing with hair loss that had resulted from years of depression, weight loss, pregnancy, and the use of chemicals in her hair dating back to her work in Hairspray (Lake confirmed that it was her actual hair that was used during the filming: "I went from Hairspray to 'Hairless'"), which caused her to finally cut her receding hair and then reveal her new buzz-cut (she also noted that her first talk show, in which they did outrageous hairstyle episodes, was another factor in her decision). Lake said the struggle had been "debilitating, embarrassing, painful, scary, depressing, lonely," noting that "there have been a few times where I have even felt suicidal over it. Almost no one in my life knew the level of deep pain and trauma I was experiencing". Lake assured everyone that she had not been diagnosed with other medical conditions related to the hair loss, and wanted to embrace her new look, saying that "I am liberated. I am free. I am releasing and letting go. I am brave. I am beautiful. I am love".

In February 2021, she announced that she was engaged to Ross Burningham. They married in January 2022.

On January 8, 2025, Lake lost her home in the Palisades Fire.

== Filmography ==
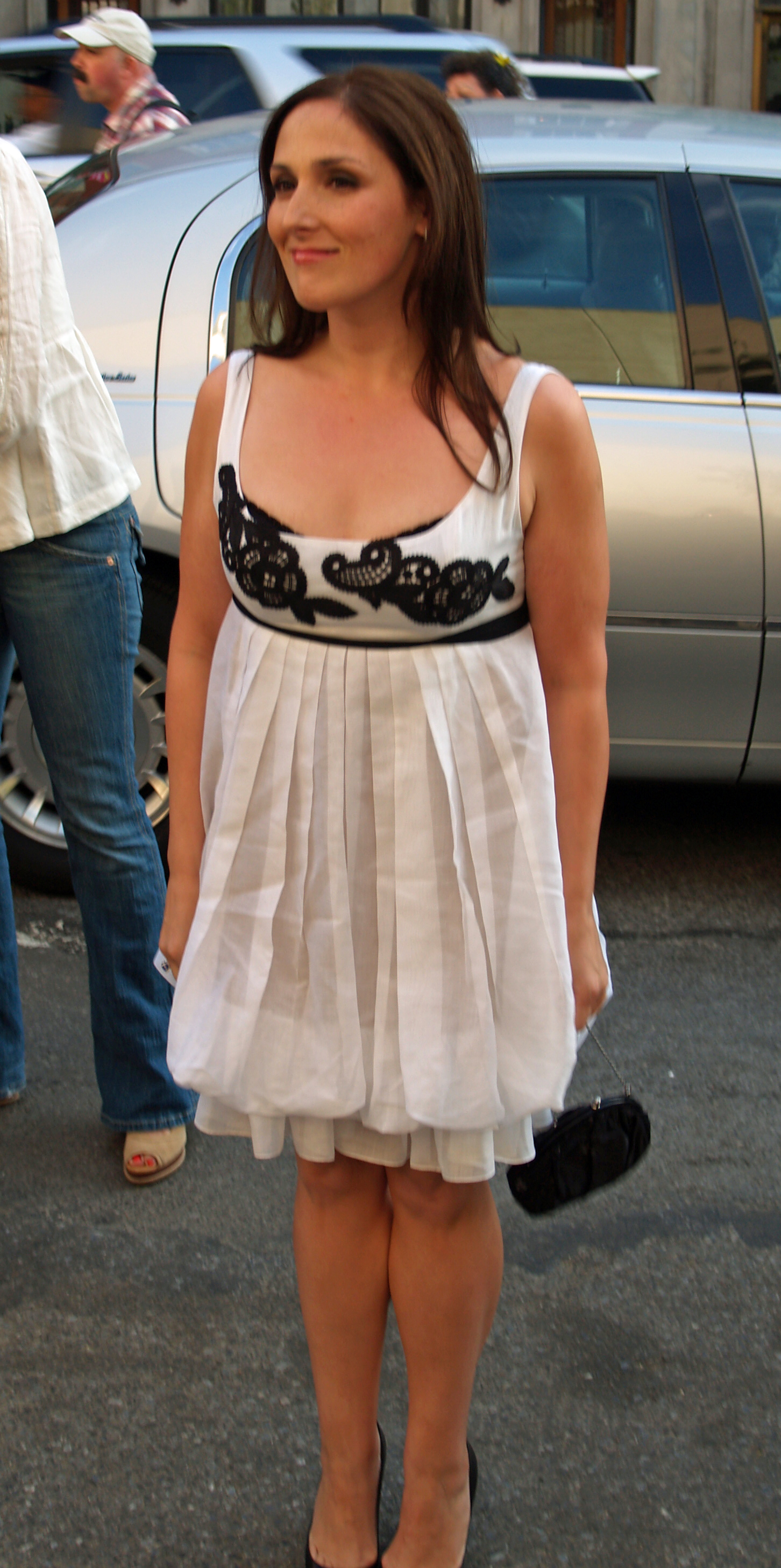
Lake in April 2007 at the premiere of The Business of Being Born

=== Film ===
Year	Film	Role	Notes
1988	Hairspray	Tracy Turnblad	
1988	The In Crowd	Dancer	
1988	Working Girl	Bridesmaid	
1989	Baby Cakes	Grace	TV movie
1989	Cookie	Pia	
1989	Last Exit to Brooklyn	Donna	
1990	Cry-Baby	Pepper Walker	
1991	The Chase	Tammie	TV movie
1992	Where the Day Takes You	Brenda	
1992	Inside Monkey Zetterland	Bella the Stalker	
1992	Buffy the Vampire Slayer	Charlotte	
1993	Based on an Untrue Story	Velour	TV movie
1993	Skinner	Kerry Tate	
1994	Cabin Boy	Figurehead	
1994	Serial Mom	Misty Sutphin	
1996	Mrs. Winterbourne	Connie Doyle	
1998	Murder She Purred: A Mrs. Murphy Mystery	Mary Minor "Harry" Haristeen	TV movie
2000	Cecil B. Demented	Libby	
2004	A Dirty Shame	Herself	
2005	The Naked Brothers Band: The Movie	Herself	
2006	Park	Peggy	
2007	Hairspray	Talent agent	
2007	Matters of Life and Dating	Linda Dackman	TV movie
2009	Loving Leah	Rabbi Gerry	TV movie
2016	Hairspray Live!	One of Mr. Pinky's Girls	TV movie
2017	Gemini	Vanessa	
2021	Under the Christmas Tree	Marie	TV movie
2022	Moon Manor	Herself	

=== Television ===
Year	Title	Role	Notes
1987	Kate & Allie	Teri	Episode: "Send Me No Flowers"
1988	Get Fresh	Herself	Episode: "Episode #3.25"
1988	ABC Afterschool Special	Carmen	Episode: "A Family Again"
1989–90	China Beach	Holly Pelegrino	Recurring Cast: Season 3
1990	Gravedale High	Cleofatra (Voice)	Main Cast
1991	Riders in the Sky	Broadway Baby	Episode: "Horsenapped"
1991–92	The Idiot Box	Daughter	Recurring Cast
1993–04	Ricki Lake	Herself/Host	Main Host
1994	Movie Magic	Herself	Episode: "Creature Makeup: Masks and Mirrors"
1995	The Critic	Herself (voice)	Episode: "Lady Hawke"
1999	Penn & Teller's Sin City Spectacular	Herself	Episode: "Episode #1.19"
1999	Intimate Portrait	Herself	Episode: "Ricki Lake"
1999–01	E! True Hollywood Story	Herself	Guest Cast: Season 3 & 5
1999–03	Hollywood Squares	Herself/Panelist	Recurring Panelist
2000–01	The King of Queens	Stephanie Heffernan	Recurring Cast: Season 3
2002–04	Pyramid	Herself/Contestant	Recurring Contestant
2004	Biography	Herself	Episode: "John Waters"
2004	Celebrity Blackjack	Herself	Episode: "Tournament 1, Game 1"
2004	Higglytown Heroes	Carpenter Hero (Voice)	Episode: "Soup with Stars/The Happy Friendly Sparkly Toast Club"
2004–05	Celebrity Poker Showdown	Herself	Guest Cast: Season 4 & 6
2005	Kathy Griffin: My Life on the D-List	Herself	Episode: "Out & About"
2006	Gameshow Marathon	Herself/Host	Main Host
2006	King of the Hill	Lila (Voice)	Episode: "Hank's Bully"
2007	WWE Raw	Herself	Episode: "Bobby Lashley enters the Masterlock Challenge"
2008	American Idol	Herself	Episode: "Live Results Show: One Contestant Eliminated"
2009	Charm School with Ricki Lake	Herself/Host	Main Host
2009	Easy to Assemble	Herself	Episode: "Gotcha! Covered"
2010	Drop Dead Diva	Susan Semler	Episode: "Back from the Dead"
2010	Gylne tider	Herself	Episode: "Episode #4.1"
2011	More Business of Being Born	Herself	Main Guest
2011	Dancing with the Stars	Herself/Contestant	Contestant: Season 13
2012	All the Right Moves	Herself	Recurring Cast
2012–13	The Ricki Lake Show	Herself/Host	Main Host
2016	Crazy Ex-Girlfriend	Dream Ghost #1	Episode: "Josh Has No Idea Where I Am!"
2016–17	Celebrity Name Game	Herself/Contestant	Episode: "David Alan Grier & Ricki Lake #1-#3"
2017	Cocktails & Classics	Herself	Episode: "Hairspray"
2017	Celebrity Juice	Herself	Episode: "Episode #18.5"
2018	Through the Keyhole	Herself	Episode: "Paddy McGuinness, Catherine Tyldsley, Chris Kamara"
2018	Drop the Mic	Herself	Episode: "Shaquille O'Neal vs. Ken Jeong and Jerry Springer vs. Ricki Lake"
2018	The '90s Greatest	Herself	Recurring Guest
2018	The Talk	Herself/Guest Co-Host	Episode: "Ricki Lake/Jenna Fischer/Josh McBride"
2018	Unexpected	Herself/Host	Episode: "Tell All"
2019	The Masked Singer	Herself/Raven	Contestant: Season 1
2019	The X Factor: Celebrity	Herself/Contestant	Recurring Contestant
2020	Cooked with Cannabis	Herself/Panellist	Main Panellist
2020	Whose Line Is It Anyway?	Herself	Episode: "Ricki Lake"
2020	Celebrity Family Feud	Herself	Episode: "Kathie Lee Gifford vs. Ricki Lake and 2 Chainz vs. Big Boi"
2022	The Wheel	Herself/Poker Expert	Episode: "Déjà Vu & Eyes of Blue"
2023	That's My Jam	Herself	Episode: "Episode #1.7"
2023	Rewind the '90s	Herself	Episode: "The Reality Revolution"
2023	Pictionary	Herself/Team Captain	Recurring Team Captain: Season 2
2024	25 Words or Less	Herself/Contestant	Episode: "Ricki Lake and Jaleel White #1-#6"

=== Documentary ===
Year	Title
2008	The Business of Being Born
