= The Business of Being Born =

- Directed by: Abby Epstein
- Produced by: Abby Epstein; Paulo Netto; Amy Slotnick; Ricki Lake
- Cinematography: Paulo Netto
- Edited by: Madeleine Gavin
- Music by: Jason Moss (as Supersonic Music); Andre Pluess
- Distributed by: New Line Cinema
- Release date: January 9, 2008
- Running time: 87 minutes
- Country: United States
- Language: English

The Business of Being Born is a 2008 documentary film that explores the contemporary experience of childbirth in the United States. Directed by Abby Epstein and produced by Ricki Lake, it compares various childbirth methods, including midwives, natural births, epidurals, and Cesarean sections.

== Content ==
The film criticizes the American health care system with its emphasis on medicines and costly interventions and its view of childbirth as a medical emergency rather than a natural occurrence. Lake drew inspiration for the documentary from the disappointing experience she had had with the birth of her first son, Milo Sebastian Sussman.

The film documents actual home births and water births, including in the latter category that of Lake's own second son, Owen Tyler Sussman. They follow a midwife, Cara, in New York City as she takes care of and attends several births. They then give the audience several statistics about our current birthing techniques and challenge today's doctors. Many experts are interviewed and they cite a multitude of reasons for these, such as the overuse of medical procedures in the interest of saving time.

== Cast ==
- Ricki Lake
- Abby Epstein
- Julia Barnett Tracy
- Louann Brizendine
- Michael L. Brodman
- Natashia Fuksman

== Reception ==
On the review aggregator website Rotten Tomatoes, 81% of 27 critics' reviews are positive. The website's consensus reads: "Epstein's argument in favor of home birthing is certainly biased -- but its biases are so transparent, and so impassioned, that they work in the film's favor." Metacritic, which uses a weighted average, assigned the film a score of 68 out of 100, based on 10 critics, indicating "generally favorable" reviews.

== DVD release ==
The DVD was released in the US on May 6, 2008 and soon after an international version was released.

== See also ==
- Orgasmic Birth: The Best-Kept Secret
- Homebirth
- Waterbirth
- Midwife
- Doulas
