= House of Hope =

House of Hope can refer to:

- House of Hope (album), by Toni Childs (1991), or its title track
- House of Hope (fort)
