= City of Joy (2016 film) =

2016 documentary film

- Directed by: Madeleine Gavin Taylor Krauss (uncredited)
- Written by: Madeleine Gavin
- Produced by: Allyson Luchak
- Starring: Christine Schuler-Deschryver; Denis Mukwege Mukengere; Eve Ensler
- Cinematography: Taylor Krauss; Lisa Rinzler
- Edited by: Madeleine Gavin
- Music by: Lokua Kanza; tomandandy
- Distributed by: Netflix
- Release dates: November 11, 2016 (DOC NYC); September 7, 2018
- Running time: 74 minutes
- Countries: United States, Congo
- Languages: English, French, Swahili

City of Joy is a 2016 documentary film directed and written by Madeleine Gavin. It follows the first class of students at a leadership center in the east of the Democratic Republic of Congo.

The film was released by Netflix on September 7, 2018.

== Premise ==
The east of the Democratic Republic of Congo is a region in which being a woman is hard since she often experiences violence in the wake of a 20-year war, driven by colonialism. In the film, women band together at the leadership center to find a way to handle the horrible experiences that they had to live and to come out on the other side to be leaders and inspirations for other women in the region.
