= David Baerwald =

American singer-songwriter

- Born: David Francis Baerwald; July 11, 1960 (age 65); Oxford, Ohio, US
- Genres: Rock; folk; folk-pop; country
- Occupations: Singer-songwriter; musician
- Instruments: Vocals; guitar; keyboards; orchestration
- Formerly of: David & David
- Website: dbinfosource.com

David Francis Baerwald (born July 11, 1960) is an American singer-songwriter, composer, and musician.

== Career ==
Baerwald first came to prominence in 1986 as one half of the duo David & David, with David Ricketts. David and David's sole album, Boomtown, went platinum and stayed on the Billboard album chart for over a year, winning substantial critical acclaim, the debut single "Welcome to the Boomtown" became a top 40 Billboard hit. The duo split up following the success of that album for unexplained reasons.

Following the breakup of David + David, Baerwald focused on writing for others, often under pseudonyms, though he found time to record and release two albums: Bedtime Stories, a romantic album based on tales of suburban ennui and decay, featuring Joni Mitchell on guitar and backup vocals on the track "Liberty Lies" (Baerwald later sang backup for Mitchell and appear in the video "Nothing Can Be Done" from her 1991 album Night Ride Home); and Triage, an ambitious narrative song-suite about the fringe-dwellers of America's paranoid and disaffected subcultures. Both albums were released to critical acclaim but did not see the commercial success that Boomtown did.

In fall of 1992, with friend and producer Bill Bottrell, he cofounded the "Tuesday Music Club", a loose assemblage of musicians whose weekly sessions became the creative force behind Sheryl Crow's debut album Tuesday Night Music Club.

His songs have been recorded by a wide range of artists ranging from the aforementioned Crow to artists as disparate as Japanese classical artists the Yoshida Brothers, opera legend Luciano Pavarotti, rebel-country frontrunner Waylon Jennings, Bangles front woman Susanna Hoffs, LA genre-agnostic outfit Fishbone, country star LeAnn Rimes, jazz artist Holly Cole, critic's darling Jesca Hoop, and actor/singers Kristen Stewart, Olivia Newton-John, Nicole Kidman, Ewan McGregor, Ethan Hawke, Hayden Panettiere, Ashlee Simpson, and Steven Strait, among many others.

Outside of popular music, Baerwald has worked extensively as both a songwriter and instrumental score composer in film and television, including the Golden Globe-nominated song from the Baz Luhrmann musical Moulin Rouge! called "Come What May", for which he also won the International Film Music Award, and which has been covered by a wide variety of international artists. He is also a skilled multi-instrumentalist, with a primary focus on stringed instruments.

In 2009 he completed work on the Howard Zinn/Matt Damon/Chris Moore film The People Speak, for which he also co-produced an album of the same name with long-term associate Tony Berg, featuring new performances from Bob Dylan, Bruce Springsteen, Randy Newman, Pink, Eddie Vedder, Taj Mahal, Jackson Browne, and others.

== The Fire Agent ==
In 2022, Spiegel & Grau announced the acquisition of Baerwald's debut novel The Fire Agent, a love story and saga of global espionage, world wars and the emergence of fascism. Inspired by the lives of his own grandfather and father, The Fire Agent centers on a Japan-based, German Jewish director of the IG Farben chemical company and a U.S. Army intelligence officer in Tokyo during the post-World War II American occupation. World English rights for The Fire Agent were acquired by Aaron Robertson and Cindy Spiegel at Spiegel & Grau on a pre-empt from Stephanie Steiker at Regal Hoffman & Associates in a significant deal.

== Personal life ==
He is the son of Hans Baerwald, a political scientist, and Diane Moore, a psychologist.

== Discography ==
=== Albums ===
- Boomtown (1986) David & David
- Bedtime Stories (1990)
- Triage (1993)
- A Fine Mess (1999)
- Hurlyburly (2002)
- Here Comes The New Folk Underground (2002)
- Hellbound Train 5 song EP (2016) Internet Only
- Hard Times 8 song EP (2017) Internet Only
- Reckless Boy with the Regulators 8 song EP (2018) Internet Only
- Hellbound Train 5 song EP (2021)
