= The Woman's Boat =

Studio album by Toni Childs
- Released: May 24, 1994
- Recorded: 1993
- Genre: Rock / Pop
- Length: 63:51
- Label: Geffen
- Producer: Toni Childs, David Bottrill

Toni Childs chronology
House of Hope (1991)	The Woman's Boat (1994)	The Very Best of Toni Childs (1996)

Singles from The Woman's Boat
- 1. "Lay Down Your Pain" Released: 1994

Professional ratings
Review scores
Source	Rating
Allmusic	4/5 stars

The Woman's Boat is the third album by American singer/songwriter Toni Childs. Released in 1994, it was Childs' first and only album for the Geffen Records label and would be her last studio album for fourteen years.

The album was not a commercial success and failed to chart in the U.S., although the single "Lay Down Your Pain" reached #13 on the U.S. Billboard Dance/Club Play Chart in January 1995 and also earned Childs a Grammy nomination for Best Female Rock Vocal Performance.

== Track listing ==
All tracks composed by Toni Childs and Jimmy Smyth; except where indicated

1. "Womb" (Childs) – 4:49
2. "Welcome to the World" – 6:15
3. "Predator" – 6:46
4. "I Just Want Affection" (Childs) – 5:58
5. "I Met a Man" (Childs) – 4:44
6. "The Woman's Boat" (Childs, David Rhodes) – 5:04
7. "Wild Bride" – 4:02
8. "Sacrifice" – 5:16
9. "Lay Down Your Pain" (Childs, David Rhodes) – 6:10
10. "Long Time Coming" – 4:33
11. "Death" – 10:27

== Personnel ==
- Toni Childs – vocals, synthesizer
- Peter Gabriel – vocals
- Sultan Khan – sarangui
- Trey Gunn – stick
- Ron Aslan – programming, engineer
- Caroline Dale – cello
- Robert Fripp – guitar
- Lee Ann Harris – percussion
- Sabine Kabongo – voices
- Peter McKinney – drums
- David Rhodes – guitar
- Carole Rowley – voices
- Jimmy Smyth – synthesizer, bass, guitar, piano
- Kate St. John – cor anglais
- Martin Tillman – cello
- Pandit Dinesh – tabla, voices
- Eric Flickinger – voices
- Ben Findlay – voices
- Kirsty Allen – voices
- Max Jules Brooks – programming
- Ron Reeves – didjerid

== Charts ==
Chart (1994)	Peak Position
Australian Albums (ARIA)	24
New Zealand Albums (RMNZ)	34
