= Welcome to the Boomtown =

Single by David & David

from the album Boomtown
- B-side: "A Rock for the Forgotten"
- Released: 1986
- Recorded: 1985
- Genre: Rock
- Length: 5:30
- Label: A&M
- Songwriters: David Baerwald; David Ricketts
- Producer: Davitt Sigerson

David & David singles chronology
"Welcome to the Boomtown" (1986)	"Swallowed by the Cracks" (1987)

"Welcome to the Boomtown" is the Los Angeles themed debut hit single by David & David from the album Boomtown. The single initially received airplay on album oriented rock stations and later crossed over to contemporary hit radio formats. It reached number 8 on the Album Rock Tracks and number 37 on the Billboard Hot 100 in 1986.

== Release ==
"Welcome to the Boomtown" debuted at number 50 on the Radio & Records top 60 AOR tracks National Airplay chart for the week dated August 1, 1986, receiving airplay from 62 reporting AOR stations that week. It also received 17 adds to AOR radio station playlists, making it the eighth most added song in that format. The song jumped from number 50 to number 35 on that chart the following week and received 35 adds to AOR stations, making it the fifth most added song in that radio format. Later in August, a music video for "Welcome to the Boomtown" was added to active rotation on MTV. The video was directed by Larry Williams and produced by a team consisting of Jane Friedman and Francie Moore of Liebman/Moore Productions.

For the week dated October 3, 1986, the song had accumulated its second week at number seven on the Radio & Records AOR tracks chart and was also receiving airplay from 25 percent of reporting contemporary hit radio stations. The song was listed by Billboard as a "retail breakout" based on its "future sales potential based on initial market reaction" at reporting retailers. By the middle of November, 51 percent of reporting contemporary hit radio stations were playing the song, with particular concentration in the American midwest. Billboard reported that the song was a top ten hit based on airplay in the cities of Cleveland, Akron, Ohio, Atlanta and Minneapolis. David Baerwald, a member of David & David, commented on the song's success in an interview with People magazine, saying that it was "very cool to hear people singing a song that we doubted would ever get on the radio."

== Charts ==
Chart (1986)	Peak position
Australia (Kent Music Report)	27
US Hot 100 (Billboard)	37
US Album Rock Tracks (Billboard)	8
