= House of Hope (album) =

Studio album by Toni Childs
- Released: June 25, 1991
- Recorded: October 1990−March 1991, August 1989
- Studios: Avatar, Topanga Skyline, Capitol Studios, Secret Sound LA, Sunset Sound, Sunset Sound Factory, One On One/The Gray Room, Larrabee Sound, Encore, Air LA, The Nut Ranch, The Chapel, Right Track Recording, A&M
- Genres: Rock, pop, pop rock
- Length: 53:18
- Label: A&M
- Producers: David Ricketts, Toni Childs, Gavin MacKillop

Toni Childs chronology
| Union (1988) | House of Hope (1991) | The Woman's Boat (1994) |

Singles from House of Hope
- 1. "I've Got to Go Now" Released: July 1991; 2. "House of Hope" Released: November 1991; 3. "I Want to Walk with You" Released: February 1992; 4. "Heaven's Gate" Released: 1992

Professional ratings
Review scores
| Source | Rating |
|---|---|
| AllMusic | 3/5 stars |
| Chicago Tribune | 4/4 stars |

House of Hope is the second album by American singer/songwriter Toni Childs, released in 1991. It was Childs' second and final album for A&M.

The album's title track was included in the 1991 film Thelma and Louise, and appeared on the film's soundtrack album.

== Critical reception ==
People called it "a record nearly bereft of the colorful melodies and joint-jolting rhythms that distinguished Childs’s first outing." Trouser Press wrote that "the album raises more provocative questions than Union, but it misses that album’s celebratory quality."

== Track listing ==
All songs written by Toni Childs and David Ricketts except where noted.

1. "I've Got to Go Now" 6:27
2. "Next to You" 5:15 (Toni Childs)
3. "House of Hope" 4:51
4. "Daddy's Song" 6:37 (Toni Childs, David Ricketts, David Rhodes)
5. "Heaven's Gate" 5:15
6. "The Dead Are Dancing" 4:31
7. "I Want to Walk With You" 5:02 (Toni Childs, David Ricketts, David Rhodes)
8. "Where's the Light" 5:33
9. "Put This Fire Out" 5:43
10. "Three Days" 4:14

== Personnel ==
- Toni Childs – vocals
- Andy Summers – guitar
- David Daniels - guitar
- Tony Guerrero – horn
- Jim Keltner – percussion
- Brent Lewis – percussion
- Reggie Burrell – background vocals
- Vinnie Colaiuta – drums
- Luis Conte – percussion
- Scott Crago – drums
- Teresa DeLucio – background vocals
- Denny Fongheiser – drums
- David Hidalgo – guitar, accordion
- Barbara Imhoff – harp
- Rick Marotta – drums
- Jill Mele – background vocals
- Tim Pierce – guitar
- David Rhodes – guitar
- David Ricketts – bass, guitar, drums, keyboards
- Chas Sandford – guitar
- John Philip Shenale – keyboards, programming
- Crystal Wilson – background vocals
- Penni Wilson – background vocals
- Will Donato – horn
- Tony Maynahan - horn
- Jerry Jr. Watts – bass
- Jeff Martin – keyboards

== Charts ==
=== Weekly charts ===
| Chart (1991) | Peak position |
|---|---|
| Australian Albums (ARIA) | 4 |
| Austrian Albums (Ö3 Austria) | 31 |
| New Zealand Albums (RMNZ) | 5 |
| Norwegian Albums (VG-lista) | 8 |
| Swiss Albums (Schweizer Hitparade) | 31 |
| US Billboard 200 | 115 |

=== Year-end charts ===
| Chart (1991) | Position |
|---|---|
| Australian Albums (ARIA) | 24 |
| New Zealand Albums (RMNZ) | 31 |

== Certifications ==
| Region | Certification | Certified units/sales |
|---|---|---|
| Australia (ARIA) | 2× Platinum | 140,000^{^} |
| New Zealand (RMNZ) | Gold | 7,500^{^} |
^{^} Shipments figures based on certification alone.
