= Don't Walk Away (Toni Childs song) =

1988 single by Toni Childs

Single by Toni Childs

from the album Union
- B-side: "Hush"
- Released: August 1988
- Length: 3:56
- Label: A&M
- Songwriter(s): Toni Childs; Phil Ramacon
- Producer(s): David Tickle

Toni Childs singles chronology
"Stop Your Fussin'" (1988)	"Don't Walk Away" (1988)	"Walk and Talk Like Angels" (1988)

Music video
- "Don't Walk Away" on YouTube

"Don't Walk Away" is a song by American singer-songwriter Toni Childs, released in August 1988 as the second single (first in the United States) from her debut studio album, Union (1988). It was her only single to appear on the US Billboard Hot 100 chart, peaking at number 72. At the 31st Annual Grammy Awards, the song earned Childs nominations for Grammy Award for Best Female Rock Vocal Performance.

== Track listings ==
7-inch

1. "Don't Walk Away" – 3:56
2. "Hush" – 4:04

12-inch and maxi-CD single

1. "Don't Walk Away" (extended Version) - 7:30
2. "Don't Walk Away" (7" Edit) - 3:56
3. "Don't Walk Away" (album version) - 3:58

== Charts ==
=== Weekly charts ===
Chart (1988–1989)	Peak position
Australia (ARIA)	17
Italy Airplay (Music & Media)	1
Netherlands (Single Top 100)	55
New Zealand (Recorded Music NZ)	12
UK Singles (OCC)	53
US Billboard Hot 100	72
West Germany (GfK)	40
