= Boomtown (David & David album) =

Studio album by David & David
- Released: July 7, 1986
- Recorded: 1985–1986
- Studios: Skyline Recording, Topanga; A&M Studios, Hollywood; Mad Hatter Studios, Los Angeles; Capitol Studios, Hollywood
- Genre: Rock
- Length: 40:56
- Label: A&M
- Producer: Davitt Sigerson

David Baerwald chronology
Boomtown (1986)	Bedtime Stories (1990)

Singles from Boomtown
- 1. "Welcome to the Boomtown" Released: 1986; 2. "Swallowed by the Cracks" Released: 1986; 3. "Ain't So Easy" Released: 1987

Boomtown is the Los Angeles-themed debut studio album by the American rock duo David & David, released on July 7, 1986, through A&M Records. It is the sole album from the duo.

== Release and reception ==
Professional ratings
Review scores
Source	Rating
AllMusic	4.5/5 stars
Robert Christgau	A−
The Rolling Stone Album Guide	4/5 stars

Michael Ofjord of AllMusic called Boomtown an "artful record, full of poetry and convincing stories of the hard times that many silently endured." He gave the record four and a half out of five stars, concluding that "one may not want to listen to this record to lift the spirit, but it is a strong reminder of difficult situations faced during what can be perceived by many as the best of times."

At the time of its release, Boomtown had some commercial success, peaking at number 39 on the chart in December. Its singles, "Welcome to the Boomtown", "Swallowed by the Cracks" and "Ain't So Easy", all received airplay, especially on rock-formatted radio stations, and most of them charted on the Billboard Hot 100. In 1995, the album was certified gold in the U.S.

Baerwald and Ricketts played all the instruments on the album except for drums on some tracks which were played by Ed Greene.

Although Baerwald and Ricketts would go on to co-write some of the material for Sheryl Crow's debut album, the duo pursued divergent musical paths with Baerwald developing his solo career and Ricketts working with singer Toni Childs.

== Track listing ==
All tracks are written by David Baerwald and David Ricketts, except where noted.

No.	Title	Writer(s)	Length
1.	"Welcome to the Boomtown"		5:31
2.	"Swallowed by the Cracks"		4:16
3.	"Ain't So Easy"		4:51
4.	"Being Alone Together"		5:31
5.	"A Rock for the Forgotten"		4:26
6.	"River's Gonna Rise"		4:29
7.	"Swimming in the Ocean"		4:00
8.	"All Alone in the Big City"		4:42
9.	"Heroes"	Baerwald	3:10

== Personnel ==
=== Musicians ===
- David & David – vocals, bass, guitar, dobro, lap steel guitar, mandolin, keyboards, piano, drums, harmonica
- Phil Shenale – programming
- Ed Greene – drums
- Paulinho da Costa – percussion
- Camille Henry – additional vocals
- Toni Childs – additional vocals
- Noland Void – additional vocals

=== Technical ===
- Produced by Davitt Sigerson
- Engineered and mixed by John Beverly Jones
- Assistant engineer – Judy Clapp
- Art direction – Chuck Beeson, Melanie Nissen
- Photos and design – Melanie Nissen
- Mastered by Bernie Grundman at Bernie Grundman Mastering, Hollywood, CA
- Management – Peregrine Watts-Russell

== Chart performance ==
=== Album ===
Chart	Peak
United States Billboard 200	39
Australia (Kent Music Report)	49
Swedish Album Charts	47
New Zealand RIANZ Album Chart	33
