= I've Got to Go Now =

1991 single by Toni Childs

"I've Got To Go Now"

Single by Toni Childs

from the album House of Hope
- Released: 8 July 1991
- Length: 6:26 (album version); 4:40 (single version)
- Label: Polydor; A&M
- Songwriters: David Ricketts; Toni Childs
- Producers: David Ricketts; Toni Childs; Gavin Mackillop

Toni Childs singles chronology
"Many Rivers to Cross" (1989)	"I've Got To Go Now" (1991)	"House of Hope" (1991)

Music video
- "I've Got to Go Now" on YouTube

"I've Got to Go Now" is a song written by David Ricketts and Toni Childs and released as the first single from Childs' second album, House of Hope (1991), in July 1991. The lyrics tell a tale of a woman leaving an abusive relationship. In a review of House of Hope, Tom Demalon of AllMusic said, "Childs dramatic vocals imbue the protagonist with willful, albeit fragile, resolve and a spirit that is moving."

The song was a commercial success in Australia, reaching number five on the ARIA Singles Chart, and it also peaked at number 19 in New Zealand. It has since been certified gold in Australia for shipments exceeding 35,000 copies. The song was not as successful worldwide, only reaching number 78 in Germany.

== Track listings ==
Australasian CD and cassette single; UK 7-inch single

1. "I've Got to Go Now"
2. "Three Days"

UK CD single

1. "I've Got to Go Now"
2. "Don't Walk Away" (extended remix)
3. "Three Days"

UK 12-inch single

A1. "I've Got to Go Now" (alternate ending) – 4:40
A2. "Three Days" – 4:15
B1. "Don't Walk Away" (extended remix) – 7:32

European CD single

1. "I've Got to Go Now" – 4:40
2. "Zimbabwe" (remix) – 6:25
3. "Three Days" – 4:14

== Charts ==
=== Weekly charts ===
Chart (1991)	Peak position
Australia (ARIA)	5
Germany (GfK)	78
New Zealand (Recorded Music NZ)	19

=== Year-end charts ===
Chart (1991)	Position
Australia (ARIA)	36

== Certifications ==
Region	Certification	Certified units/sales
Australia (ARIA)	Gold	35,000^{^}
^{^} Shipments figures based on certification alone.
