= Michael L. Brodman =

American gynecologist

- Education: Rutgers University, University of South Carolina
- Known for: urogynecology
- Medical career
- Profession: gynecologist
- Institutions: The Mount Sinai Hospital

Michael L. Brodman is an American gynecologist and obstetrician and currently the Ellen and Howard C. Katz Professor and Chairman of the Department of Obstetrics, Gynecology and Reproductive Science at Mount Sinai Hospital, Mount Sinai Health System, and Icahn School of Medicine at Mount Sinai in New York City. He is recognized internationally as a pioneer in the field of urogynecology.

Brodman is a Board Examiner for the American Board of Obstetrics and Gynecology, and has been a member of both the Council on Resident Education in Obstetrics and Gynecology and the Association of Professors in Obstetrics and Gynecology. He has twice received Council and Association Awards for Teaching Excellence in Obstetrics and Gynecology.

Brodman has been the Principal or co-investigator on 19 grants and has published multiple book chapters and abstracts. He appeared in the documentary film, The Business of Being Born, in 2008.

== Biography ==
Brodman received his B.S. from Rutgers College of Engineering in New Brunswick, New Jersey in 1975. He earned his M.S. from the University of South Carolina's College of Engineering in 1977, and his M.D. from Mount Sinai School of Medicine in 1982. His post-doctoral training included a residency and a fellowship in pelvic surgery at Mount Sinai.

Brodman is involved in several global health initiatives and serves on the board of the International Organization for Women and Development, an organization that performs fistula repair surgery in Niger.

== Honors and awards ==
- 1974 Tau Beta Pi, National Engineering Honor Society
- 1974 Pi Mu Epsilon, National Electrical Engineering Honor Society
- 1975 Rutgers College of Engineering Slade Scholar Award for Independent Research
- 1975 Who's Who in American Colleges and Universities
- 1977 Eta Kappa Nu, National Mathematics Honor Society
- 1986 Administrative Chief Resident Award, Department of Obstetrics, Gynecology and Reproductive Science, Mount Sinai Hospital, New York, NY
- 1988 Teacher of the Year Award, Department of Obstetrics, Gynecology and Reproductive Science, Mount Sinai School of Medicine, New York, NY
- 1992 Association of Professors in Gynecology and Obstetrics for Outstanding Achievement in the Area of Resident Teaching and Education
- 1993 Best Poster Presentation, "Operating room personnel morbidity from CO2 laser use during preceptored surgery", M. Brodman et al. The Council for Resident Education in Obstetrics and Gynecology
- 1993 Teacher of the Year Award, Department of Obstetrics, Gynecology and Reproductive Science, Mount Sinai School of Medicine, New York, NY
- 2002 Teacher of the Year Award, Department of Obstetrics, Gynecology and Reproductive Science, Mount Sinai School of Medicine, New York, NY
- 2005 Physician of the Year Award, Mount Sinai Department of Nursing
- 2007 Alpha Omega Alpha, Honor Medical Society

== Books and chapters ==
Partial list:

- Michael Brodman; Charles J Ascher-Walsh MD: "Acute Gynecologic Pain" Pediatric, Adolescent, & Young Adult Gynecology, Page: 347–357, 2009, ISBN 1-4051-5347-4
- Brodman M, Thacker J, Kranz R: Straight Talk About Sexually Transmitted Diseases, NY, Bascom Communications, 1993. ISBN 0-8160-2864-8
- Brodman M, Friedman F: Care of the critically ill obstetric patient, in Cherry S, Merkatz I (eds): Medical, Surgical and Gynecologic Complications of Pregnancy, Baltimore, MD, Williams and Wilkins, 1991, pp 1044 1054 (Chapter 64). ISSN 0342-4642
- Flisser AJ, Brodman ML, and Nezhat F. In Prevention and Management of Laparoendoscopic Complications. Kavic MS and Levinson CJ, eds. Washington: Society of Laparoendoscopic Surgeons, 2004

== Publications ==
Partial list:

- Howell, EA; Egorova, NN; Janevic, T; Brodman, M; Balbierz, A; Zeitlin, J; Hebert, PL (2020). "Race and Ethnicity, Medical Insurance, and Within-Hospital Severe Maternal Morbidity Disparities". Obstet Gynecol. 135: 285–293. doi:10.1097/AOG.0000000000003667. PMC 7117864. PMID 31923076.
- Friedman, AM; Ananth, CV; Lavery, JA; Fleischer, AA; Chazotte, C; D'Alton, ME (2019). "Implementing Obstetric Venous Thromboembolism Protocols on a Statewide Basis: Results from New York State's Safe Motherhood Initiative". Am J Perinatol. 36: 574–580. doi:10.1055/s-0038-1668549. PMID 30212917.
- Boodaie, BD; Bui, AH; Feldman, DL; Brodman, M; Shamamian, P; Kaleya, R; Rosenblatt, M; Somerville, D; Kischak, P; Leitman, IM (2018). "A perioperative care map improves outcomes in patients with morbid obesity undergoing major surgery". Surgery. 163: 450–456. doi:10.1016/j.surg.2017.09.047. PMID 29195738.
- Rhee, AJ; Valentin-Salgado, Y; Eshak, D; Feldman, D; Kischak, P; Reich, DL; LoPachin, V; Brodman, M (2017). "Team Training in the Perioperative Arena: A Methodology for Implementation and Auditing Behavior". Am J Med Qual. 32: 369–375. doi:10.1177/1062860616662703. PMID 27516608.
- Galende, E; Karakikes, I; Edelmann, L; Desnick, RJ; Kerenyi, T; Khoueiry, G; Lafferty, J; McGinn, JT; Brodman, M; Fuster, V; Hajjar, RJ; Polgar, K (2009). "Amniotic Fluid Cells Are More Efficiently Reprogrammed to Pluripotency Than Adult Cells". Cloning Stem Cells. 12 (2): 117–25. doi:10.1089/cell.2009.0077. PMC 2998987. PMID 20677926.
- Copperman, KB; Schertz, JC; Witkin, G; Sandler, B; Brodman, M; Copperman, AB (Sep 2007). "Patients' return to referring physicians and its relation to their infertility duration". J Women's Health (Larchmt). 16 (7): 1012–6. doi:10.1089/jwh.2006.0306. PMID 17903078.
- Vardy, MD; Brodman, M; Olivera, CK; Zhou, HS; Flisser, AJ; Bercik, RS (Jul 2007). "Anterior intravaginal slingplasty tunneller device for stress incontinence and posterior intravaginal slingplasty for apical vault prolapse: a 2-year prospective multicenter study". Am J Obstet Gynecol. 197 (1): 104.e1–8. doi:10.1016/j.ajog.2007.03.056. PMID 17618778.
- Irwin, KL; Moorman, AC; O'Sullivan, MJ; Sperling, R; Koestler, ME; Soto, I; Rice, R; Brodman, M; Yasin, S; Droese, A; Zhang, D; Schwartz, DA; Byers, RH (Apr 2000). "Influence of human immunodeficiency virus infection on pelvic inflammatory disease". Obstet Gynecol. 95 (4): 525–34. doi:10.1016/s0029-7844(99)00621-3. PMID 10725484. S2CID 19352774.
- Kalir, T; Goldstein, M; Dottino, P; Brodman, M; Gordon, R; Deligdisch, L; Wu, H; Gil, J (May 1998). "Morphometric and electron-microscopic analyses of the effects of gonadotropin-releasing hormone agonists on uterine leiomyomas". Arch Pathol Lab Med. 122 (5): 442–6. PMID 9593346.
- Irwin, KL; Rice, RJ; Sperling, RS; O'Sullivan, MJ; Brodman, M (Sep 1994). "Potential for bias in studies of the influence of human immunodeficiency virus infection on the recognition, incidence, clinical course, and microbiology of pelvic inflammatory disease". Obstet Gynecol. 84 (3): 463–9. PMID 8058250.
- Thomas, AG; Dottino, P; Brodman, M; Friedman, F Jr (Aug 1994). "Laparoscopic Pomeroy tubal ligation in a residency training program". J Am Assoc Gynecol Laparosc. 1 (4): 321–4. doi:10.1016/s1074-3804(05)80796-0. PMID 9138872.
- Irwin, KL; Rice, RJ; O'Sullivan, MJ; Sperling, R; Brodman, M (Mar 1994). "Pelvic inflammatory disease in human immunodeficiency virus-infected women". Obstet Gynecol. 83 (3): 480–2. PMID 8127550.
- Brodman, M; Port, M; Friedman, F Jr; Sperling, R; Dottino, P; Thomas, AG (Apr 1993). "Operating room personnel morbidity from carbon dioxide laser use during preceptored surgery". Obstet Gynecol. 81 (4): 607–9. PMID 8459977.
- Brodman, M; Dottino, P; Friedman, F Jr; Heller, D; Bleiweiss, I; Sperling, R (May 1992). "Human papillomavirus-associated lesions of the vagina and cervix. Treatment with a laser and topical 5-fluorouracil". J Reprod Med. 37 (5): 453–6. PMID 1324311.
