= Water birth =

Childbirth that occurs in water

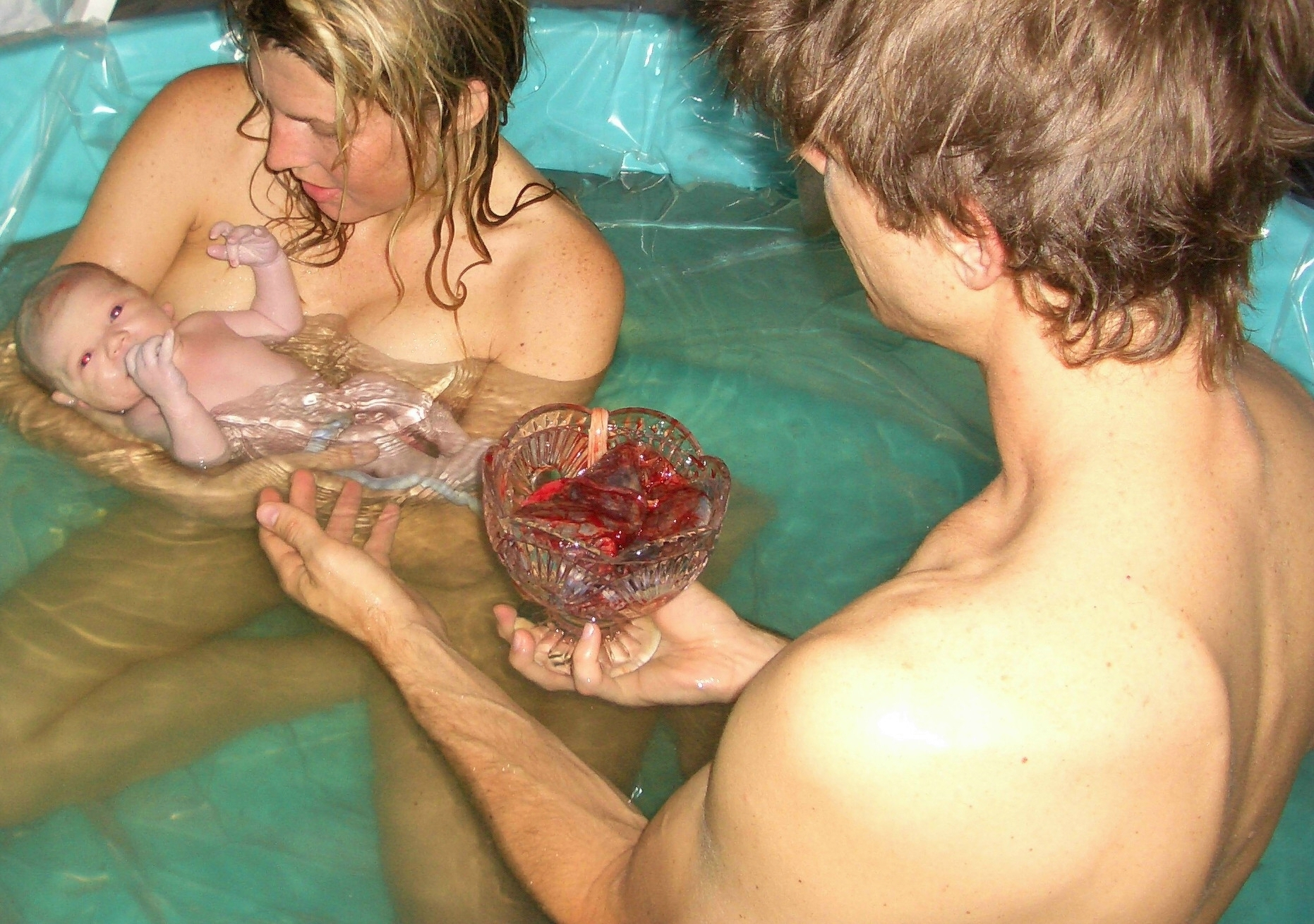
A mother participating in a water birth.

Water birth

Water birth is childbirth that occurs with the laboring person submerged in water, usually a birthing pool. It may include the use of water for relaxation and pain relief during the first stage of labour, birth into water in the second stage of labour, and the delivery of the placenta in the third stage of labour. This practice may occur at a hospital or at home. There is not significant evidence to endorse or reject some of the reported benefits. Through history and today, the process is underreported and studies often lack enough of a range of participants and situations to generate a thorough understanding.

The first recording of water birth in the modern Western world was in France in 1805. The next significant study of underwater birth and the use of birthing pools was in the 1980 by Igor Charkovsky in a series of experiments in Moscow, Russia.

== Benefits ==
Water birth was associated with a more positive childbirth experience including more reports of relaxation and less pain. There have also been notable reports of a decrease in the odds of postpartum hemorrhaging, neonatal infection, low infant Apgar scores, admission to the NICU, and neonatal aspiration that required resuscitation. Some or all of these reduced risks could have been aided by the presence of a midwife, which is common in water births. Water birth may offer perineal support for the mother, and some theorize that this may decrease the risk of tearing and reduce the use of episiotomy. Water birth was also associated with higher rates of breastfeeding initiation in the delivery room. Evidence for this is not strong.

Evidence indicates that water immersion during the first stage of childbirth reduces the length of that stage and the pain of labour. Several studies, including a 2018 Cochrane Review, found that immersion at this stage reduces the use of epidural analgesia. It is also associated with a lower rate of cesarean delivery and stress urinary incontinence symptoms 42 days after delivery. There is no evidence of increased adverse effects for immersion during the first or second stages of labour.

== Risks ==
Water birth has not been properly and significantly documented in order to give a full picture of its effects. It is a relatively new practice in hospitals and to study it, low-risk pregnancies with healthy women are needed. Therefore, a major risk is the fact that there are a lot of unknowns when it comes to this understudied practice.

Water birth has been associated with a higher rate of cord avulsion, also known as the snapping of the umbilical cord. This can pose risk to the infant, but is usually manageable with proper treatment and preparation. Statements on water birth by peak gynecological and midwifery bodies in the UK, Australia and New Zealand all stipulate that exclusion criteria apply for high risk births.

== Birth pool ==
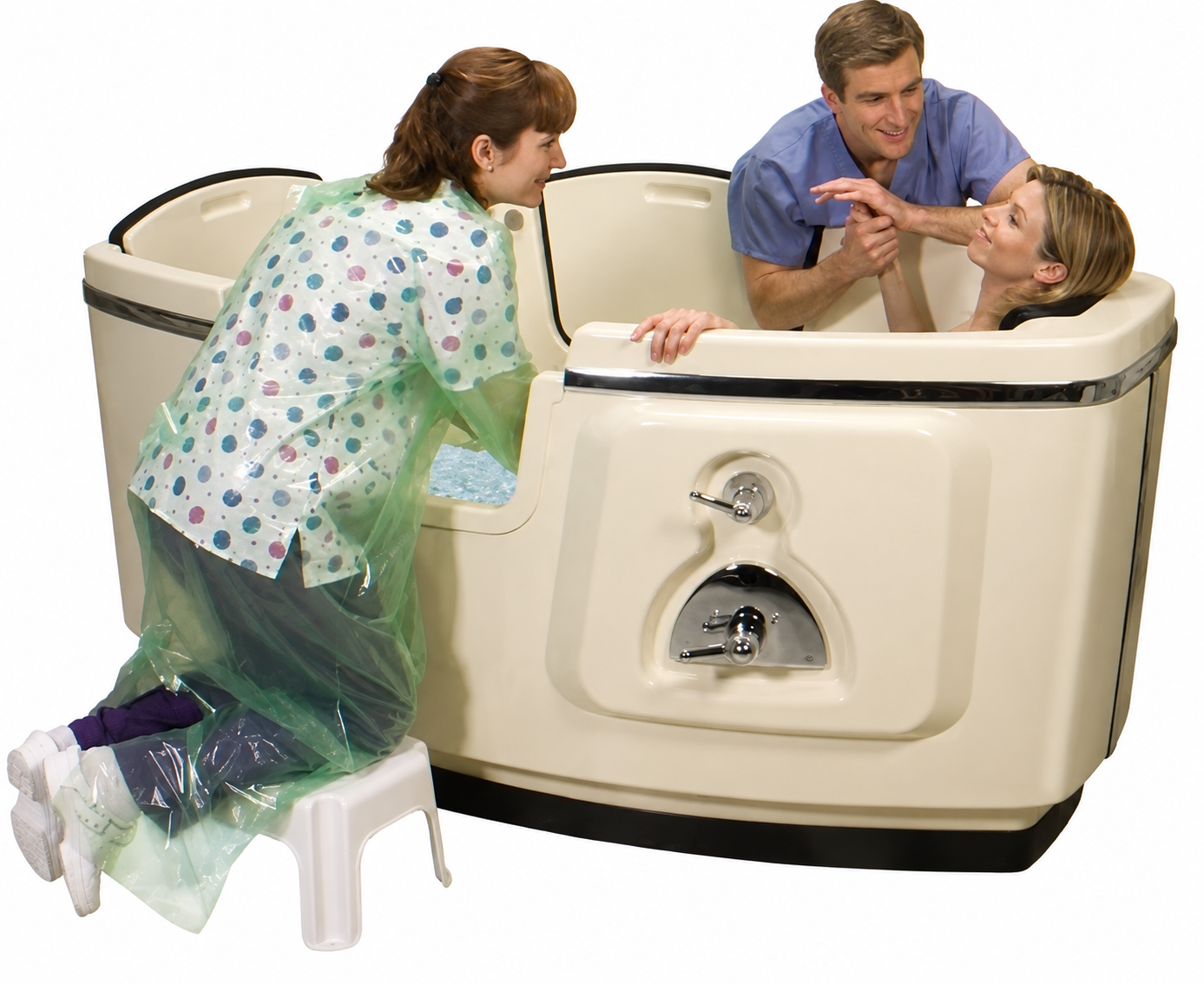
Birth tub set up for a water birth

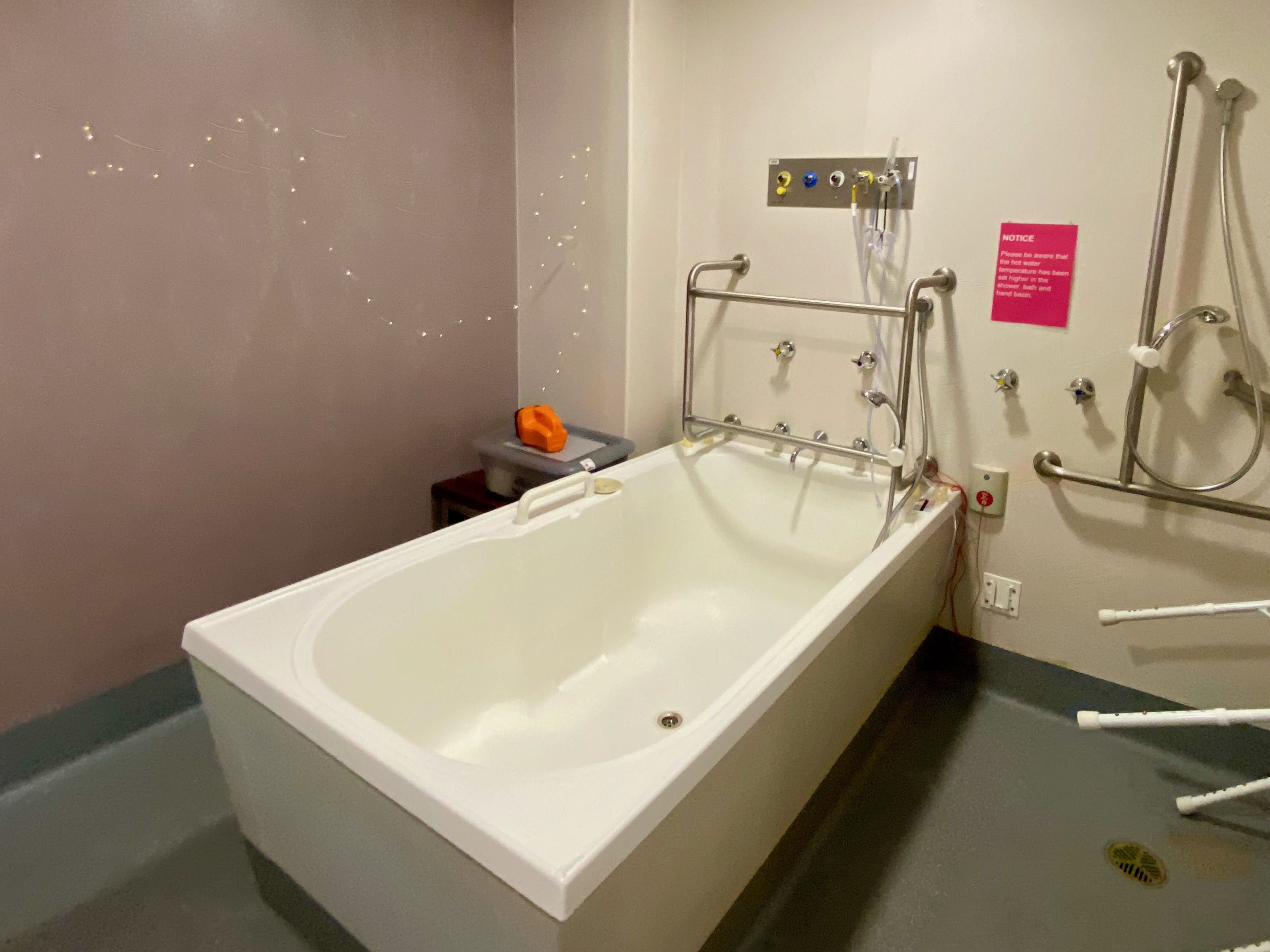
A birth pool at the Royal Women's Hospital, Australia

A birth pool is a specially designed vessel for water birth. They are generally larger than bathtubs to enable buoyancy and freedom of movement during labour. A birth pool can either be permanently installed or portable.

=== Characteristics ===
Before birth pools became readily available there were many stories of women labouring and birthing in re-purposed tub-like products including animal watering troughs.

The original circular birth pool used by Michel Odent, the originator of the concept of birthing pools, at Pithiviers hospital in France in the early 1980s was 2 metres (6 ft 7 in) in diameter and 60 centimetres (24 in) deep, large enough to comfortably accommodate two people. Modern birth pools are somewhat smaller, with a diameter between 110–150 cm (43–59 in) and at least 50 cm (20 in), preferably 56 cm (22 in), of water.

== Around the world ==
=== United Kingdom ===
The first official water birth in the UK was recorded on the 12th October 1984 in Hendon, London.

Approximately 10% of births in the UK take place in water, and approximately 20% of births include the use of water for pain relief. A cohort study carried out in the UK of 73,229 women concluded that there was no association with adverse fetal or maternal outcomes.

Health policy in England stipulates women should be given the opportunity to labour in water through the publication of Intrapartum care guidelines issued in 2007 by the National Institute for Health and Care Excellence (NICE). The Royal College of Obstetricians and Gynaecologists and the Royal College of Midwives have jointly supported labour and birthing in water, and encourage hospitals to ensure birth pools are available to all women.

Birthing pools are available in many public hospitals in the UK.

=== Australia and New Zealand ===
The Royal Australian and New Zealand College of Obstetricians and Gynaecologists supports the use of water immersion during labour within safety and clinical guidelines, noting that there is evidence of benefits to the mother and no evidence of adverse effects to the mother or baby. The New Zealand College of Midwives supports water immersion during labour when there are no factors that would prevent it, noting that there is no evidence for adverse fetal or maternal outcomes, but that further evidence is required for the delivery of the placenta. The Australian College of Midwives also supports immersion in water during labour and/or birth.

Birthing pools are available at many public and private hospitals in Australia and New Zealand.

=== United States ===
Water birth is not commonly available in hospitals in the United States, and American clinical opinion is generally skeptical of the practice. The American College of Obstetricians and Gynecologists does not recommend birthing in water, although its 2016 Committee Opinion on the matter states that immersion in water during the first stage of labour may be offered to women with uncomplicated pregnancies.

In a 2005 commentary, the Committee on Fetus and Newborn of the American Academy of Pediatrics (AAP) released an analysis of the scientific literature regarding underwater births. The Committee noted several positive studies for underwater birth but went on to criticize them for lacking proper scientific controls, a significant number of infant deaths and diseases, and the general lack of information to support the use of water births.

In 2014, Evans Army Community Hospital at Fort Carson, Colorado, began offering water labor to women with low-risk pregnancies seeking a drug-free labor. The hospital used 145-gallon water labor tubs, with warm-water immersion and buoyancy reported to help reduce pain and promote relaxation during labor. The program was intended for labor rather than necessarily for giving birth underwater.

Cleveland Clinic also offers water labor at some of its birthing centers, with dedicated water-birthing tubs available for labor and hydrotherapy to promote relaxation and pain management. In 2023, Cleveland Clinic was named the winner of the "Best Hospital to Have a Baby" category in the Northeast Ohio Parent Choice Awards, which noted the availability of water-birthing tubs at some of its centers.
