= Eve Ensler =

American playwright, performer, feminist, and activist (born 1953)

V
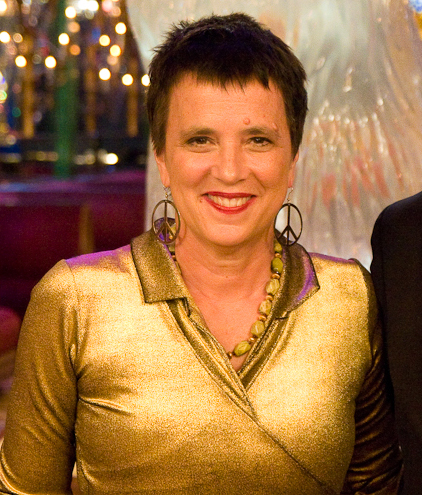
- V in March 2011
- Born: Eve Ensler; May 25, 1953 (age 73); New York City, U.S.
- Occupations: Playwright; Author; Performer; Activist
- Spouse: Richard McDermott (m. 1978; div. 1988)
- Website: eveensler.org

V (born Eve Ensler [/ˈɛnslər/]; May 25, 1953) is an American playwright, author, performer, feminist, and activist. V is best known for her play The Vagina Monologues. In 2006 Charles Isherwood of The New York Times called The Vagina Monologues "probably the most important piece of political theater of the last decade."

In 2011, V was awarded the Isabelle Stevenson Award at the 65th Tony Awards, which recognizes an individual from the theater community who has made a substantial contribution of volunteered time and effort on behalf of humanitarian, social service, or charitable organizations. V was given this award for her creation of the non-profit V-Day movement which raises money and educates the public about violence against women, gender expansive people, and the Earth - and efforts to stop it.

She writes for The Guardian and has been featured in films including V-Day's Until the Violence Stops, the PBS documentary What I Want My Words to Do to You, and the Netflix documentary City of Joy, among others. She regularly appears in print, radio, podcast, and television interviews including on CNN, Democracy Now!, Today, Real Time with Bill Maher and Russell Simmons Presents Def Poetry.

== Personal life ==
V was born in New York City, the second of three children of Arthur Ensler, an executive in the food industry, and Chris Ensler. She was raised in the northern suburb of Scarsdale. Her father was Jewish and her mother Christian, and she grew up in a predominantly Jewish community; however, V identifies herself as a Nichiren Buddhist and says that her spiritual practice includes chanting Namu Myōhō Renge Kyō and doing yoga.

V says that from the ages of five to ten, she was sexually and physically abused by her father. Growing up, she has said she was "very sad, very angry, very defiant. I was the girl with the dirty hair. I didn't fit anywhere."

V attended Middlebury College in Vermont, where she became known as a militant feminist. After graduating in 1975, she had a string of abusive relationships and became dependent on drugs and alcohol. In 1978, she married Richard Dylan McDermott, a 34-year-old bartender, who convinced her to enter rehab. She adopted Mark Anthony McDermott, her husband's 16-year-old son from his first marriage. Their relationship came to be a close one, and V said that it taught her "how to be a loving human being". After V suffered a miscarriage, Mark took the name she had planned for her baby, Dylan. V and Dylan's father separated in 1988, the former citing that she "needed the independence, the freedom". According to a 2012 article in the Sydney Morning Herald, "After her marriage ended, she had a long relationship with the artist and psychotherapist Ariel Orr Jordan but is single now, which seems to suit her nomadic lifestyle – she has homes in New York and Paris but travels much of the year."

A June 2010 article by V in The Guardian said that she was receiving treatment for uterine cancer. She wrote about her experience with cancer in her memoir, In The Body of the World. In an interview with Democracy Now! in 2012, V stated that she was two and a half years cancer free.

=== Name change ===
After publishing her book The Apology in 2019, where she described sexual and physical abuse by her late father, the author stated she wished to distance herself from the surname he used and expressed her preference to be called by the mononym V.

== The Vagina Monologues ==
V wrote The Vagina Monologues in 1996. First performed in the basement of the Cornelia Street Café in Greenwich Village, the play premiered at HERE Arts Center, Off-Off-Broadway in New York and was followed by an Off-Broadway run in at Westside Theatre. Subsequently, the play has been translated into 48 languages and performed in over 140 countries. Celebrities who have starred in it include Jane Fonda, Whoopi Goldberg, Idina Menzel, Glenn Close, Susan Sarandon, Marin Mazzie, Cyndi Lauper, Mary Testa, Sandra Oh and Oprah Winfrey. V was awarded the Obie Award in 1996 for 'Best New Play' and in 1999 was awarded a Guggenheim Fellowship Award in Playwriting. She has also received the Berrilla-Kerr Award for Playwriting, the Elliot Norton Award for Outstanding Solo Performance, and the Jury Award for Theater at the U.S. Comedy Arts Festival.

== Subsequent work ==
V's memoir In the Body of the World was released on April 30, 2013. Booklist reviewed the book, saying, "This is a ravishing book of revelation and healing, lashing truths and deep emotion, courage and perseverance, compassion and generosity. Warm, funny, furious, and astute, as well as poetic, passionate, and heroic, Ensler harnesses all that she lost and learned to articulate a galvanizing vision of the essence of life: 'The only salvation is kindness.'". On February 6, 2018, she premiered a theatrical version of her memoir, which she performs as a solo monologue, directed by Diane Paulus, at the Manhattan Theatre Club in New York City.

She contributed the piece "Theater: A Sacred Home for Women" to the 2003 anthology Sisterhood Is Forever: The Women's Anthology for a New Millennium, edited by Robin Morgan.

V provided uncredited contributions to the book for Wicked, the fourth-longest running Broadway show in history.

From October 2005 to April 2006, V toured twenty North American cities with her play The Good Body, following engagements on Broadway, at ACT in San Francisco, and in a workshop production at Seattle Repertory Theatre. The Good Body addresses why women of many cultures and backgrounds perceive pressure to change the way they look in order to be accepted in the eyes of society.

V's play, The Treatment debuted on September 12, 2006, at the Culture Project in New York City. This play explores the moral and psychological trauma that are the result of participation in military conflicts. It stars her adoptive son, Dylan McDermott.

In 2006, V released her first major work written exclusively for the printed page. Insecure at Last: Losing It In Our Security-Obsessed World (Villard; Hardcover; October 3, 2006). In Insecure at Last, she explores how people live today, the measures people take to keep themselves safe, and how people can experience freedom by letting go of the deceptive notion of "protection". In 2006 V also co-edited A Memory, A Monologue, A Rant, and A Prayer, an anthology of writings about violence against women.

V's work I Am An Emotional Creature: The Secret Life of Girls Around The World, a collection of original monologues about and for girls that aims to inspire girls to take agency over their minds, bodies, hearts and curiosities, was released February 2010 in book form by Villard/Random House and made The New York Times Best Seller list. The book was workshopped in July 2010 at New York Stage and Film and Vassar College, moving toward an Off-Broadway production. The theatrical production of the piece, titled Emotional Creature, had its United States debut at the Berkeley Repertory Theater in Berkeley, CA in June 2012. In February 2012, The South African production of Emotional Creature was nominated for a 2011 Naledi Theatre Award for Best Ensemble Production/Cutting Edge Production.

V was a consultant on feminism and women's issues for the 2015 action film Mad Max: Fury Road.

In 2019, V published the book The Apology, where she imagines what her now dead father would say if he was able to apologize for the sexual and physical abuse he inflicted on her as a child. After completing the work, V said that she had ceased to feel any bitterness towards her father, but that she no longer wished to carry his name, inviting people to call her V.

== Activism ==
V is an activist addressing issues of violence against women and girls. In 1998, her experience performing The Vagina Monologues inspired her to create V-Day, a global activist movement to stop violence against women and girls. V-Day raises funds and awareness through annual benefit productions of The Vagina Monologues. In 2010, more than 5,400 V-Day events took place in over 1,500 locations in the U.S. and around the world. As of 2014, the V-Day movement had raised over $100 million and educated millions about the issue of violence against women and the efforts to end it, crafted international educational, media and PSA campaigns, launched the Karama program in the Middle East, reopened shelters, and funded over 12,000 community-based anti-violence programs and safe houses in Democratic Republic of Congo, Haiti, Kenya, South Dakota, Egypt and Iraq. These safe houses provide women sanctuary from abuse, female genital mutilation and 'honor' killing. The 'V' in V-Day stands for Victory, Valentine and Vagina.

In February 2004, V, alongside Sally Field, Jane Fonda and Christine Lahti, protested to have the Mexican government re-investigate the slayings of hundreds of women in Ciudad Juárez, a city along the Texas border.

V is a supporter of the Revolutionary Association of the Women of Afghanistan (RAWA) and went to Afghanistan under the rule of the Taliban. She supports Afghan women and has organized many programs for them. She organized one event named the "Afghani Women's Summit For Democracy".

V has led a writing group since 1998 at the Bedford Hills Correctional Facility for Women, which was portrayed in What I Want My Words To Do To You. Judy Clark, Kathy Boudin, and Pamela Smart were among the writing group's participants featured in the film.

In 2011, V-Day and the Fondation Panzi (DRC), with support from UNICEF, opened the City of Joy, a new community for women survivors of gender violence in Bukavu, Democratic Republic of Congo (DRC). City of Joy provides up to 180 Congolese women a year with an opportunity to benefit from group therapy; self-defense training; comprehensive sexuality education (covering HIV/AIDS, family planning); economic empowerment; storytelling; dance; theater; ecology and horticulture. Created from their vision, Congolese women run, operate and direct City of Joy themselves. The City of Joy celebrated its first graduating class in February 2012. The story of the City of Joy, including V's involvement, is portrayed in the documentary City of Joy, screening on Netflix.

In 2012, along with the V-Day movement, V created One Billion Rising, a global protest campaign to end violence, and promote justice and gender equality for women. On February 14, 2013, V-Day's 15th anniversary, women and men in countries around the world held dance actions to demand an end to violence against women and girls.

In 2016, V co-signed a letter to Ban Ki-moon calling for a more humane drug policy, along with Warren Buffett, John Legend and Elizabeth Warren.

In 2017 in an opinion piece in The Guardian V voiced criticism of the newly inaugurated president of the United States, Donald Trump, referring to him as a "self-confessed sexual assaulter" and "our predator-in-chief".

In 2020, V endorsed Senator Bernie Sanders for President of the United States in the 2020 election.

== Selected awards and honors ==
V has received numerous awards for her artistic and humanitarian work:

- Tony Award – In 2011, V was awarded the Isabelle Stevenson Award at the 65th Tony Awards, which recognizes an individual from the theater community who has made a substantial contribution of volunteered time and effort on behalf of humanitarian, social service, or charitable organizations.
- Guggenheim Fellowship Award in Playwriting, 1999
- OBIE award for The Vagina Monologues in 1997
- Olivier Award nomination for West End Production of The Vagina Monologues
- Lion of Judah by the United Jewish Communities, 2002

== Selected works ==
=== Plays ===
- Conviction
- Lemonade
- The Depot
- Floating Rhoda and the Glue Man
- Extraordinary Measures
- The Vagina Monologues
- The Good Body
- Necessary Targets
- The Treatment
- Emotional Creature
- O.P.C.
- In the Body of the World
- Wild (book)

=== Books ===
- The Vagina Monologues New York: Villard, 1998. ISBN 9780375750526, OCLC 37492271
- Necessary Targets New York, NY: Dramatists Play Service, 2003. ISBN 9780822218951, OCLC 54060045
- The Good Body New York: Villard, 2004. ISBN 9780375502842, OCLC 56096678
- Vagina Warriors New York: Bulfinch Press, 2004. ISBN 9780821261842, OCLC 474721443
- Insecure at Last: Losing It in Our Security Obsessed World New York: Villard, 2006. ISBN 9781400063345, OCLC 70129196
- The treatment, New York: Dramatists Play Service, 2007. ISBN 9780822222026, OCLC 163587396
- A Memory, a Monologue, a Rant, and a Prayer New York: Villard, 2007. ISBN 9780345497918, OCLC 862089179
- I Am an Emotional Creature: The Secret Life of Girls Around the World New York: Villard Trade Paperbacks, 2010. ISBN 9780812970166, OCLC 958697162
- In the Body of the World: A Memoir New York: Metropolitan Books, 2013. ISBN 9780805095180, OCLC 811597425
- The Apology Bloomsbury Publishing PLC, 2019. ISBN 9781635574388, OCLC 1100557521
- Reckoning Bloomsbury Publishing PLC, 2023.

== Filmography ==
- City of Joy (2016)
- Until the Violence Stops (2004)
- What I Want My Words to Do to You: Voices From Inside a Women's Maximum Security Prison (2003)
- The Vagina Monologues (2002)
- Fear No More: Stop Violence Against Women (2002) – interviewee
