= David & David =

American rock duo

- Origin: United States
- Genre: Rock
- Years active: 1979–1987
- Label: A&M Records
- Past members: David Baerwald; David Ricketts

David & David (stylized as David + David) was an American rock duo composed of Los Angeles–based studio musicians David Baerwald and David Ricketts. They are best known for their debut single "Welcome to the Boomtown" from the album Boomtown.

Baerwald and Rickets attributed part of their decision in forming David & David to their dissatisfaction with their previous bands. The album Boomtown was produced by Davitt Sigerson and peaked at number 39 on the U.S. Billboard Top Pop Albums chart. It was certified Gold in the U.S. by the RIAA. The album also reached number 33 in New Zealand. "Welcome to the Boomtown" reached number 37 on the Billboard Hot 100 in 1986 and number eight on the Billboard Album Rock Tracks chart. It also peaked at number 27 in Australia. The follow-up single, "Swallowed by the Cracks" reached number 14 on the Album Rock Tracks chart, while "Ain't So Easy" peaked at number 51 on the Hot 100 and number 17 on the Album Rock Tracks chart.

Following the release of Boomtown, David & David embarked on a tour that began in November 1986. David & David disbanded shortly after Boomtown, and Baerwald and Ricketts continued to work with other musicians. They both collaborated with Sheryl Crow on her 1993 debut LP, Tuesday Night Music Club.

It was reported in 2016 that the duo were working on a second album.

== Discography ==
=== Studio albums ===
- Boomtown (1986)

=== Singles ===
Title	Release	Peak chart positions			Album
Title	Release	US	US Main	Aus	Album
"Welcome to the Boomtown" (b/w "A Rock for the Forgotten")	1986	37	8	27	Boomtown
"Swallowed by the Cracks" (b/w "All Alone in the Big City")	1986	—	14	96	Boomtown
"Ain't So Easy" (b/w "Swimming in the Ocean")	1987	51	17	87	Boomtown
"—" denotes a recording that did not chart.
