= David Ricketts (musician) =

American musician and record producer (born 1953)

- Born: David Jeffrey Ricketts; November 16, 1953 (age 72)
- Origin: Philadelphia, Pennsylvania, U.S.
- Genres: Rock; folk; pop
- Occupation: Singer-songwriter; record producer
- Instruments: Vocals; guitar; keyboards
- Formerly of: David & David

David Jeffrey Ricketts (born November 16, 1953) is an American musician and record producer.

Ricketts scored hits in the mid-1980s with David Baerwald in their group David & David, notably the track "Welcome to the Boomtown" from their only album Boomtown.

His romantic relationship with singer Toni Childs formed the basis for her critically acclaimed debut album, Union, which Ricketts co-wrote and produced. Union was nominated for several Grammy Awards.

He collaborated with Sheryl Crow on her debut Tuesday Night Music Club and is credited on the songs "Leaving Las Vegas" and "Strong Enough". Guitarist and songwriter Robbie Robertson tapped Ricketts to collaborate on Storyville, Robertson's second solo album.

He also produced and performed on Meredith Brooks' 1997 album, Blurring the Edges, which contained her hit "Bitch".

Ricketts won an Emmy for the song co-written with Eddie Free and Toni Childs, "Because You're Beautiful".
