= List of non-governmental organizations in Nepal =

A list of notable non-governmental organizations working in Nepal.

Ngo working for health welfare

== Women ==
Name of the organisation	Year of Establishment	Founder/President	Headquarter District	International / National Recognition	Focus Area
Institute for Rural Development	2024	Asmod Khakurel	Nuwakot	Partnership with Oxford Diplomatic Society (ODS)	Cultural Exchange, Youth Empowerment through Sports, Education, and Capacity Building, Health and Well-being Initiatives
ABC Nepal	1987	Durga Ghimire	Kathmandu	Help for Self Help Award 2012	Human Trafficking, Violence against women, Women Rights
Aama Samuha	1989	Gurung people	Dolakha		Spread awareness about Women’s Rights, Organize relief operations for oppressed women
Maiti Nepal	1993	Anuradha Koirala	Kathmandu	CNN heroes	Human Trafficking
Shakti Samuha	1996	Charimaya Tamang	Kathmandu	Ramon Magsaysay Award 2013	Human Trafficking
Aafanta Nepal	2007		Lalitpur	MoWCSC CTIP Award 2018	Human Trafficking, Gender Based Violence, Women's Rights, and Women Empowerment Programs
Women Act	2007	Srijana Adhikari	Kathmandu	Saktirupen Sangsthita Award 2018	Gender Equality and Social Inclusion, Women Empowerment Programs, Economic Empowerment and Livelihood, Governance and Rule of Law, Disaster Risk Reduction, Climate Change and Emergency Response, Research and Publication

== Children ==
Name of the organisation	Year of Establishment	Founder/President	Headquarter District	International Recognition	Focus Area
Namlo Himalaya	2023	Ranjita Regmi	Kathmandu		Education and community development
Aamako Ghar	1999	Dil Shova Shrestha	Kathmandu		Children, women and elderly people
Prayas Nepal	2003		Kathmandu		Children, women, and elderly people
SOS Children's Villages	1973	Hermann Gmeiner	Sanothimi, Kathmandu	Conrad N. Hilton Humanitarian Prize	Children, Community Welfare and Disaster Relief
Reinstalling Hope	2013		Kathmandu, Nepal		Children, Youth

== Minorities ==
Name of the organization	Year of Establishment	Founder/President	Headquarter District	International Recognition	Focus Area

Kalyankari Samaj Sewa Kendra 2080 Magh 23 Tara Neupane Bharatpur-10 Minorities

== Infrastructure ==
=== Rural and community development ===
Homestay In Nepal	2011	Suraj Bastola	Bhaktapur	Feel like Home	all over Nepal

Homestay tourism is the only sustainable tourism business that helps local communities earn direct income through rural tourism in Nepal, therefore, working continuously in the field of homestay for the past 14 years, today as a homestay facilitator promoting homestay throughout Nepal, we offer advice, suggestions, consultation, study, I would like to inform you that I am always ready to share my experience and learning regarding research, capacity development training, program and workshop. Thank you! 9841211597 Suraj Bastola

=== Health ===
Name of the organisation	Year of Establishment	Founder/President	Headquarter District	International Recognition	Focus Area
Nepal Red Cross Society	1993	Princess Princep Shah	Kathmandu	The International Committee of the Red Cross (ICRC) and affiliated to The International Federation of Red Cross and Red Crescent Societies (IFRC)	Spreading awareness about first aid and their effort in blood donation activities in Nepal and more
Biomedical workshop Foundation Nepal	2022	Fagu Singh Limbu	Lalitpur		●To provide social and economic training and empowering youth for development and growth. ●To train medical personnel on correct handling of medical equipment ●To repair, maintain, research and record the condition of medical equipment of various government hospitals

== Agriculture and environment ==
=== Biodiversity ===
Name of the organisation	Year of Establishment	Founder/President	Headquarter District	International Recognition	Focus Area

=== Climate change ===
Name of the organisation	Year of Establishment	Founder/President	Headquarter District	International Recognition	Focus Area

=== Forestry ===
Name of the organisation	Year of Establishment	Founder/President	Headquarter District	International Recognition	Focus Area

=== Agriculture development ===
Name of the organisation	Year of Establishment	Founder/President	Headquarter District	International Recognition	Focus Area

== See also ==
- Category: Non-profit organisations based in Nepal
