= Sands of Silence: Waves of Courage =

2016 documentary film

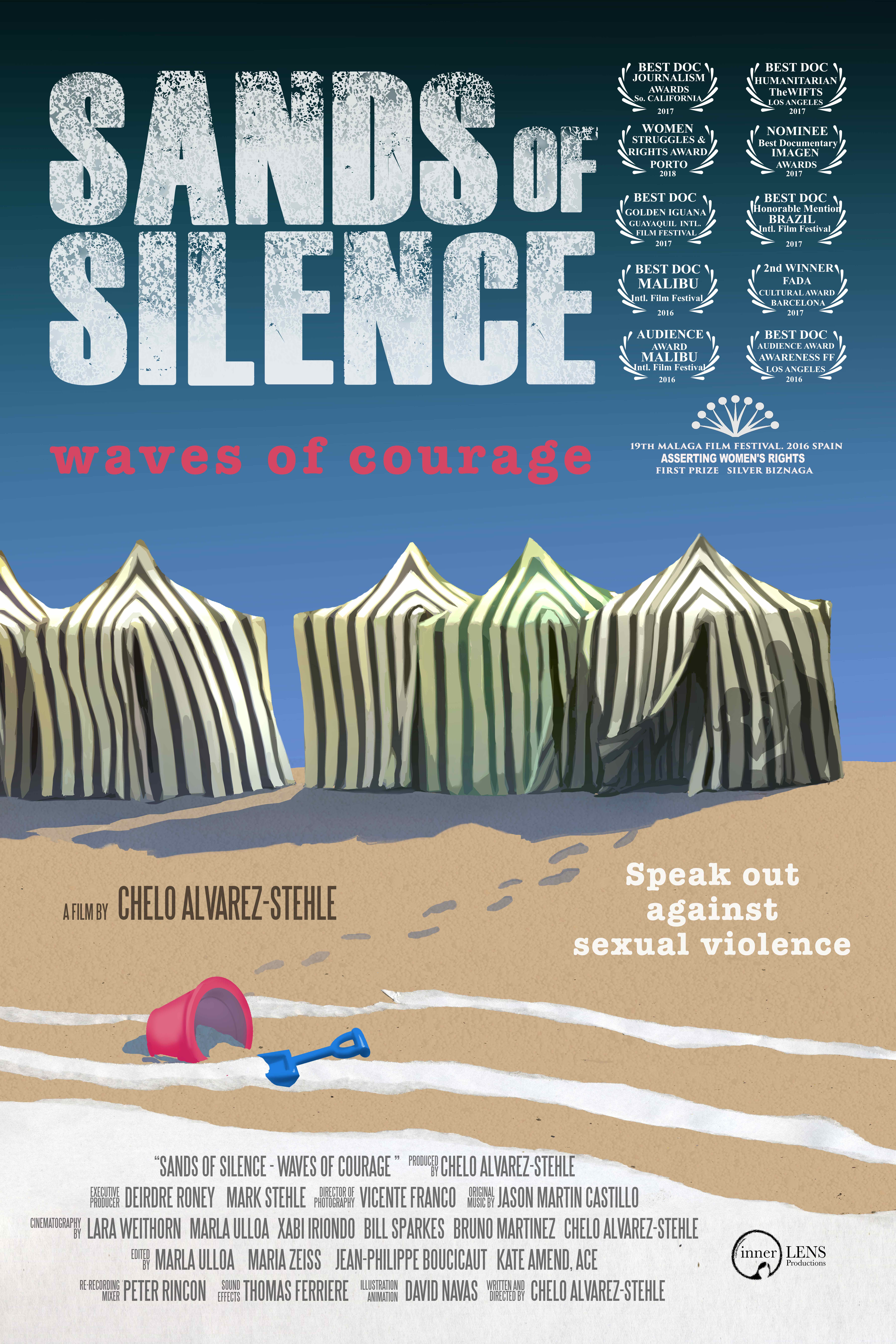
- Official film poster
- Directed by: Chelo Alvarez-Stehle
- Written by: Chelo Alvarez-Stehle
- Produced by: Chelo Alvarez-Stehle; Deirdre Roney [Executive Producer] Mark Stehle [Executive Producer]
- Starring: Virginia Isaias; Charimaya Tamang
- Cinematography: Vicente Franco; Lara Weithorn
- Edited by: Marla Ulloa; María Zeiss; Kate Amend; Jean-Philippe Boucicaut
- Music by: Jason Martin Castillo
- Production company: innerLENS Productions
- Distributed by: innerLENS Productions
- Release date: 2016
- Running time: 86 minutes / 54 minutes
- Country: United States
- Languages: English, Spanish, Nepali

Sands of Silence: Waves of Courage is a 2016 documentary film that addresses the spectrum of sexual violence, from child sexual abuse and clergy abuse to rape and sex trafficking. It was directed, written and produced by filmmaker Chelo Alvarez-Stehle.

The film has received accolades across the Atlantic, from Best Documentary award at the SoCal Journalism Awards by the Los Angeles Press Club, and Best Documentary nomination at the Imagen Awards in Hollywood to the Malaga Film Festival Asserting Women's Rights Silver Biznaga.

== Synopsis ==
After dedicating more than 15 years to expose the underworld of sexual exploitation and trafficking in Asia and the Americas, the international journalist Chelo Alvarez-Stehle finds herself in the need to return to the beach in the Basque Country that tarnished her childhood, in order to reveal family secrets. In 1998, while working with survivors of sex trafficking in Asia, Chelo met the Nepalese woman Charimaya ("Anu") Tamang, who had been kidnapped at the foot of the Himalayas and taken as a sex-slave to a Mumbai brothel. Ten years later, she meets Virginia Isaías, a Mexican resident in California that was kidnapped and forced into prostitution by a trafficking ring in Chiapas, Mexico. When Virginia manages to free herself from her captors, the viewer is fascinated by her uplifting evolution into an exemplary leader against slavery today. Inspired by the courage of Anu and Virginia, Chelo decides to deepen her unwavering passion to expose these types of stories. Hence, a parallel journey of introspection is born that breaks the silence about sexual abuse in her family and in her own life.

== Release ==
In July 2017, the film was presented at the High Level Political Forum on Sustainable Development at the United Nations in New York.

On the occasion of the 2017 International Day for the Elimination of the Violence against Woman, the film was presented at the European Parliament at an event hosted by the Progressive Alliance of Socialist and Democrats (S&D) and PES Women (Party of European Socialist).

The film was broadcast on RTVE Spain's public television broadcast in 2017.

In 2018, Patt Morrison of the Los Angeles Times, moderated a screening and Q&A of the film at the Los Angeles Press Club.

Argentina's Theatrical release of Sands of Silence in August 2019. The film was presented at universities in various continents: Yale, UCLA Law School and NYU, Oxford, Barcelona, Brisbane and Hiroshima.

Sands of Silence had its U.S. broadcast premiere on the WORLD Channel and PBS Stations on Sept. 27, 2020.

== Reception ==
The jury of the 59th SoCal Journalism Awards of Southern California, composed by members of the Los Angeles Press Club and the Washington DC Press Club commented: “A moving, poignant documentary of women learning to deal with the physiological and psychological stresses of abuse".

After its premiere in Spain, the host of RTVE Antonio Gárate called the film "touching ... shocking ... fascinating", during an interview in March 2017 to director Chelo Álvarez-Stehle and the protagonist, Virginia Isaias, trafficking survivor and founder of the Foundation of Human Traffic Survivors in California.

Voice of America: "A major effort is under way in California to fight the problem... As the documentary Sands of Silence currently in production and the [SOS_SLAVES] online game to educate young people that Alvarez-Stehle is developing".

Forbes magazine acknowledged the film's use of new technologies: “...Sands of Silence utilizes technology in a way that brings voice to the victims and survivors of sexual abuse and encourages audiences to take steps toward ending the culture of silence and stigma".

According to Ms. (magazine) "Alvarez-Stehle delves into the devastating and long-lasting impact of this violence, showing how childhood experiences of abuse make women vulnerable to future violence, and the ways girls and women are silenced or encouraged to deny the impact of this violence."

El Mundo daily: “Sands of Silence closes a circle: the cruel trafficking and the daily abuse, the far away and the close by, the denounced and the silent”.

El País daily called it “An invitation to break the silence".

Film critic Julie Casper Roth of Agnès Films Review analyzes: “Alvarez-Stehle... never provokes a quick response from his characters or makes a premature cut to a new scene. This establishes a visual and emotional intimacy between the viewer and the subject”.

Japanese feminist magazine Josei Tembo, published by the ICHIKAWA Fusae Center for Women and Governance, featured the film's in their cover after its Tokyo premiere.

Pablo Arahuete's critique for CineFreaks says [in Spanish] that "… a testimony of enormous courage and self-reference that quickly escapes the shortcut of the first-person catharsis. The film questions how the environments surrounding abuse interact among them once the invisible layer that covers and conceals truths, emotions and traumas that crawl over time, and last lifetime, is removed”

In 2022, director Chelo Alvarez-Stehle received The Equality Award "Teresa León Goyri - City of Logroño" which distinguishes the life and professional career of the journalist, writer, filmmaker and activist in defense of women's rights and, especially, her fight against sexual violence and trafficking. The award is named after the Logroño writer María Teresa León Goyri, politician, writer and activist, and one of the Sinsombrero (Hatless women) of the Generation of 27' as a tribute and recognition to her social commitment and literary work.

== Awards ==
- 2022 - Equality Award "Teresa León Goyri - City of Logroño"
- 2020 - Malvinas Award - Festival del Cinema Latinoamericano di Trieste, Italy.
- 2018 - Women’s Struggles and Rights Award - Porto Femme International Film Festival, Portugal.
- 2017 - Best Documentary Feature. 59th Southern California Journalism Awards - Los Angeles Press Club.
- 2017 - Best Documentary Humanitarian Award - TheWIFTS (Women’s Intl. Film and Television Showcase). Hollywood, California.
- 2017 - Best Documentary Nomination. 32nd Imagen Awards, Beverly Hills, California.
- 2017 - Second Winner. Fada Cultural Award to works on sexual abuse, Barcelona, Spain.
- 2017 - Best International Documentary Honorable Mention. Festival Brasil de Cinema Internacional. Rio de Janeiro, Brazil.
- 2017 - Best Documentary and Golden Iguana. Guayaquil International Film Festival. Ecuador.
- 2016 - Best Documentary Film. Malibu International Film Festival, California.
- 2016 - Audience Award. Malibu International Film Festival, California.
- 2016 - First Prize and Silver Biznaga (Affirming the Rights of Women). Málaga Film Festival. Spain.
