= Montse Watkins =

Author, editor, translator and journalist

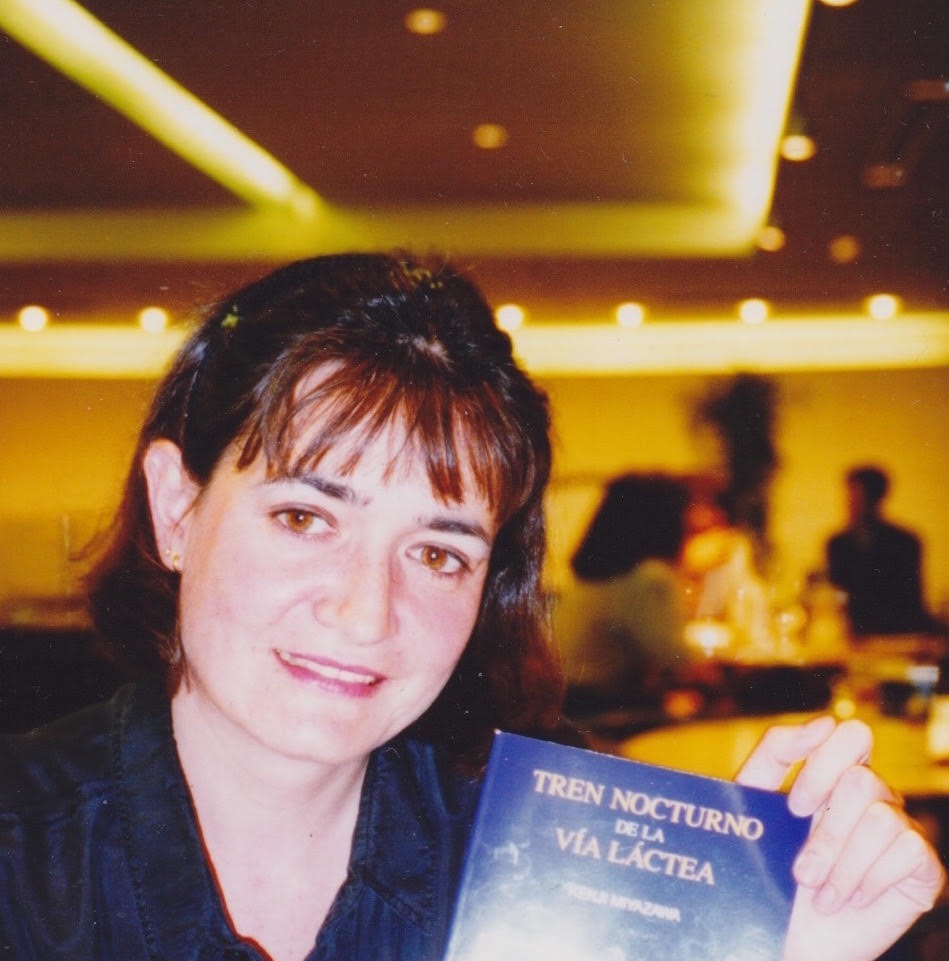
- Montse Watkins, Tokyo, 1994, with the translation of Kenji Miyazawa's Night Train in the Milky Way just off her Luna Books publishing house print. Photo: Chelo Alvarez-Stehle
- Born: Montse Watkins Pedra; August 27, 1955; Barcelona, Spain
- Died: November 25, 2000 (aged 45); Kamakura, Japan
- Occupations: Journalist, writer, editor, translator

Montse Watkins (August 27, 1955, in Barcelona, Spain – November 25, 2000, in Kamakura, Japan) was a Spanish translator, fiction writer and essayist, editor and journalist who lived in Japan from 1985 until her death in 2000. It was in this country that she carried out most of her professional activity. She was a correspondent for Spain’s Efe news agency and Avui daily, and El Mundo newspaper contributor. Watkins was well known for her research on the conditions of the nikkei, descendants of the Japanese diaspora who come to Japan in search of work not knowing the language or the culture. She is considered a pioneer in the direct translation into Spanish of Japanese literature. As an editor and translator, she always chose works by deeply engaged authors such as Kenji Miyazawa, Natsume Sōseki, Osamu Dazai and Toson Shimazaki.

== Biography ==
Montse Watkins Pedra was born in the neighborhood of La Salut (Gràcia district, Barcelona) on August 27, 1955, to Esteban Watkins Lafuente and María Teresa Pedra Gil. Her father was vice secretary general of the Catalan Football Federation for 38 years, while her mother kept house. She had a sister, Maite, two years younger. When Montse was three years old, the family moved to the Horta neighborhood (Barcelona).

There, Watkins went to a nun’s school (Dominican Sisters of the Annunciation of the Blessed Virgin), where she showed herself to be quite bright and to have a gift for languages. She later studied Agricultural Engineering at the Barcelona School of Industrial Engineering, as well as Philology for a year (1984).

In March 1985, Watkins traveled to Japan, where she immersed herself in the Japanese language and culture. “I came in search of adventure, thinking of the Japan shown in Yasujirō Ozu’s films, a refined image,” she explained in an interview published in 1999. She stayed in Japan until her death, and never returned to Spain. For three years, she studied Japanese in the prestigious Saint Joseph’s Institute of Japanese Studies in Roppongi (Tokyo), run by Franciscan friars, while living in an apartment in Tokyo’s Itabashi municipality. It was during this first period as a student in Tokyo that she began translating the writer and poet Kenji Miyazawa (1896-1933), specifically his Ginga tetsudō no yoru, which she would publish in 1994 with the title Tren nocturno de la Vía Láctea [Night on the Galactic Railroad] under Luna Books, the publishing company that Watkins founded in Tokyo under the Japanese publishing house Gendaikikakushitsu, founded by editors Masakuni Ota and Hideko Karasawa. She was the first “translator as well as editor” of Japanese literature into Spanish, and a pioneer of Spanish translation directly from the Japanese original.

In 1988, Watkins joined the Spanish news agency Efe’s Tokyo delegation staff, where she remained for seven years until 1995. From then on, she was a correspondent for the Catalan newspaper Avui, with which she kept collaborating for the rest of her life. She also collaborated with the daily El Mundo.

In 1991, she met Tomi Okiyama, a Brazilian of Japanese ancestry, who would be her partner until her death. He was a member of the Latin American Worker Support Committee (CATLA). This meeting was a turning point in Watkins’ life. Along with her interest in Japanese language and culture, she now developed a concern for the conditions of the Latin American workers (mostly of Japanese ancestry) established in Japan from 1989 on, as a result of changes in this country’s migration policies. Watkins wrote two key monographs about the arrival and presence of Latin Americans in Japan, a research field in which she is considered a pioneer as well.

In 1992, her essay "Coming Back to Japan: The Nikkei Workers" was published by the AMPO Japan-Asia Quarterly Review.

In 1994, she founded Luna Books publishing house, where she published her own translations and those of other experts, journalistic essays and fiction works. The Japan Foundation sponsored some of those publications.

In October 1995, she began to write the column Octavo día [Eighth day] for the Spanish-language Japanese weekly International Press - En español, founded in 1994 and aimed for the Latin American community. Later, Octavo día would become A vista de pájaro [Bird’s-eye view]. This collaboration continued uninterrupted until October 2000, the month before her death, due to cancer, in a Kamakura hospital. She also published opinion pieces in several other Spanish-language Japanese periodicals such as Musashi and Kyodai.

Watkins’ biography is being written by journalist and documentary filmmaker Chelo Alvarez-Stehle, who is also making the documentary “Montse Watkins: Kamakura Tales”, an initiative sponsored by researcher Elena Gallego Andrada.

== Works ==
=== Original works ===
Ever since she founded Luna Books, Watkins began an intense activity as an author, translator and editor in Japan. She wrote two journalistic essays about Latin Americans in that country, two collections of stories and a compilation of traditional legends; she translated eleven literary works, and published a collection of stories by Latino authors living in Japan. Watkins translated and published countless translations by classical Japanese authors. Included among them are three works by Kenji Miyazawa, one being El mesón con muchos pedidos y otros cuentos (Chūmon no ooi ryōriten) [The hectic inn], with her collaborator the researcher Elena Gallego Andrada.

=== Fiction works written by Watkins ===
- El portal rojo [The red gate]. Three short stories set in Japan. Gendaikikakushitsu Publishers/Luna Books, 1994. ISBN 4-7738-9413-X. Also issued in Portuguese as O Portal Vermelho by the same publisher. Japanese publishing house Kawade Shobo Shinsha published it in 1996 as Gekko monogatari [Tales under the moonlight], translated by Takashi Nakada. ISBN 4-309-20262-4
- Las gafas rotas [The broken glasses]. Brief satire on life in modern Japan. Short novel. Gendaikikakushitsu Publishers/Luna Books, 1996. ISBN 4-7738-9602-7 Also issued in Portuguese as Óculos quebrados. Pequena sátira da vida no Japão moderno and in Japanese as ひびわれた眼鏡 Hibiwareta megane, 1996 ISBN 4773896027 9784773896022
- Leyendas de Kamakura [Kamakura legends]. A collection of legends featuring samurais, older monks, and magical animals. Gendaikikakushitsu Publishers/Luna Books, 1998. ISBN 4-7738-9805-4

=== Non-fiction works written by Watkins ===
- Pasajeros de un sueño. Emigrantes latinoamericanos en Japón [A dream’s passengers. Latin American migrants in Japan]. A comprehensive reportage on the arrival and settling in Japan of Latin American workers. Also issued in Portuguese as “Passageiros de um sonho” and in Japanese as “Hikkage no nikkeijin” [Nikkei workers: Japan's hidden face]. Gendaikikakushitsu Publishers/Luna Books, 1995. ISBN 4-88202-286-9
- ¿El fin del sueño? Latinoamericanos en Japón [The end of the dream? Latin Americans in Japan]. Reportage on the arrival and settling in Japan of Latin American workers. Also issued in Portuguese as “¿O fim do sonho? Latino-americanos no Japão” and in Japanese as “Yume no yukue”. Gendaikikakushitsu Publishers/Luna Books, 1999. ISBN 4-7738-9910-7

=== Works edited by Watkins ===
- Encuentro [Encounter]. Collection of stories by Latino authors in Japan. Gendaikikakushitsu Publishers/Luna Books, 1997. ISBN 4-7738-9720-1

== Translations ==
Watkins was a pioneer in the direct translation of Japanese literature into Spanish.

- Tren nocturno de la Vía Láctea (Ginga tetsudō no yoru) [Night on the Galactic Railroad], by Kenji Miyazawa. Includes two other stories by the author. Gendaikikakushitsu Publishers/Luna Books, 1994.Issued also in Portuguese as “Trem Noturno da Via Láctea.” ISBN 4-7738-9609-4
- El dragón [The Dragon]. Short stories by Ryūnosuke Akutagawa. Gendaikikakushitsu Publishers/Luna Books, 1995. ISBN 4-7738-9506-3
- Historias mágicas [Magical stories]. Ten short stories and a poem by Kenji Miyazawa. Gendaikikakushitsu Publishers/Luna Books, 1996. ISBN 4-7738-9610-8
- Soy un gato (Wa-ga-hai wa neko de aru) [I Am a Cat], selected chapters, by Natsume Sōseki. Gendaikikakushitsu Publishers/Luna Books, 1996. ISBN 4-7738-9519-5
- Historias misteriosas [Mysterious stories]. Short stories by Koizumi Yakumo (Lafcadio Hearn). Gendaikikakushitsu Publishers/Luna Books, 1996. ISBN 4-7738-9612-4
- El precepto roto (Hakai) [The Broken Commandment]. A novel by Shimazaki Tōson. Gendaikikakushitsu Publishers/Luna Books, 1997. ISBN 4-7738-9710-4
- La linterna de peonía y otras historias misteriosas (Akuinen) [The peony lantern and other mystery stories]. Short stories by Koizumi Yakumo (Lafcadio Hearn). Gendaikikakushitsu Publishers/Luna Books, 1998. ISBN 4-7738-9801-1
- El ocaso (Shayō) [The Setting Sun]. A novel by Osamu Dazai. Gendaikikakushitsu Publishers/Luna Books, 1999. ISBN 4-7738-9809-7
- Indigno de ser humano (Ningen shikkaku) [No Longer Human]. A novel by Osamu Dazai. Gendaikikakushitsu Publishers/Luna Books, 1999. ISBN 4- 7738-9902-6
- El mesón con muchos pedidos (Chūmon no ooi ryōriten) [The hectic inn], by Kenji Miyazawa. Co-translator with Elena Gallego Andrada. Gendaikikakushitsu Publishers/Luna Books, 2000. ISBN 4-7738-0004-6
- Almohada de hierba (Kusamakura) [Grass Pillow]. A novel by Natsume Sōseki. Unfinished translation. After Watkins’ demise, Shigeko Suzuki finished the translation. Gendaikikakushitsu Publishers/Luna Books, 2005. ISBN 4- 7738-0413-0
