= Chelo Alvarez-Stehle =

American journalist and filmmaker (born 1957)

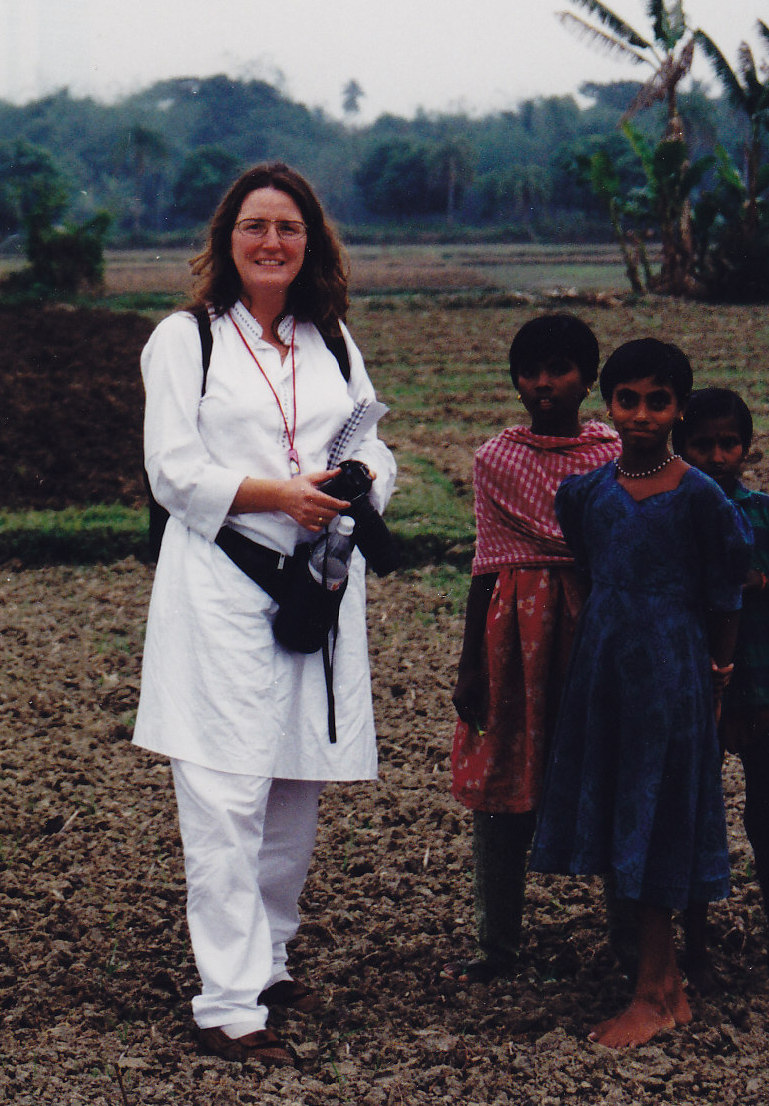
- Alvarez-Stehle in Bengal, India, 2000
- Born: María Consolación Álvarez González; 1957 (age 68–69); Logroño, Spain
- Occupations: Filmmaker, journalist and author

Chelo Alvarez-Stehle is a Spanish and American journalist and documentary filmmaker. In Japan, she worked as managing editor for International Press En Español weekly and as Tokyo correspondent for El Mundo daily. As a documentary filmmaker she is best known for Sands of Silence (Arenas de Silencio) [es], winner of the 59th Southern California Journalism Awards by the Los Angeles Press Club for Best Feature Documentary.

She was the recipient of the "Equality Award Teresa León Goyri - City of Logroño 2022" highlighting the vital and professional career of Alvarez-Stehle as journalist, writer, filmmaker and women's rights advocate and, especially, her fight against sexual violence and trafficking. The award of the City of Logroño bears the name of the Spanish politician, writer and activist of the Generation of '27, María Teresa León Goyri, one of the so-called "Hatless Women," as a tribute and recognition of her social commitment and her literary work.

On June 30, 2023, she received the "2022 Human Rights Award" granted by the Observatory for Human Rights of the Government of La Rioja for her life and professional career as a journalist, writer, filmmaker and activist in defense of human rights and women's rights; for the national and international projection of her fight against racism, sexual violence and trafficking; and for her continued work to contribute to guarantee human rights from culture and journalism. Her reports on child trafficking from Nepal to India for the magazine Planeta Humano in the documentary film 'Niñas de Hojalata' (Tin Girls) or for the feature documentary 'Arenas de Silencio' (Sands of Silence) stand out.

== Personal life ==
Alvarez-Stehle was born in Logroño, Spain. Daughter of Domingo Álvarez Ruiz de Viñaspre, surgeon and senator, and Consuelo González Oñate. In 2020, she married Mark Stehle (1948-2023,) an economist, who was also her film producing partner, and the son of artist Evelyn Stehle and theoretical physicist Philip Stehle. Their daughter Sangita Stehle is a neuroscience student.

== Career ==
Alvarez-Stehle studied medicine at University of Navarra and University of Zaragoza but dropped out.

In 1991, she was awarded the EEC's Executive Training Programme (ETP) in Japan fellowship and moved to Tokyo. She then worked for NHK Enterprises in the development of documentary films and as managing editor of International Press en español, Japan’s first Spanish weekly. In 1994, she became Tokyo's correspondent for Spain's El Mundo daily. In 1995, Chelo moved to California, settling in Malibu and continued to contribute to El Mundo and other media outlets such as Geo and Planeta Humano, specializing in social and women’s issues.

In 2002, she became an American Translators Association certified translator (English into Spanish). She has worked as a translator and a copy editor to support her creative work. Her book translation and editing includes museum guides for the J. Paul Getty Museum and the Philadelphia Museum of Art. In 2005, she edited the Spanish edition of Memory and Identity: Conversations at the Dawn of a Millennium. Pope John Paul II, Rizzoli.

In 2003, Canal+ (Spanish satellite broadcasting company) turned her first reportage on child trafficking in the Himalayas for Planeta Humano magazine into the documentary film Tin Girls (Niñas de Hojalata, 2003) directed by Miguel Bardem, for which Alvarez-Stehle was interviewer, assistant director and consultant. At the end of the filming, Chelo Alvarez-Stehle and producer José Bustos, with the support of the NGO HimRights, created the Masala Project, a spice atelier and animal farm that provided work for survivors of trafficking and opened the doors to women who practiced prostitution and were looking for a way out. The professor of private international law Ángeles Lara Aguado of the University of Granada, Spain, made an analysis of the documentary “Niñas de Hojalata” in her book “Persona, tolerancia y libertad a través del cine.”

In 2006, Alvarez-Stehle produced/directed The Power of 2, a short documentary on Cubans' thirst for inner peace, which has been distributed in over 30 countries. In 2009, she produced/directed Sold in America: A Modern-Day Tale of Sex Slavery, a short documentary on sex trafficking that premiered at the Montreal Human Rights Film Festival.

In 2016 she produced, with director Tim Nackashi, the short Through The Wall, about a family divided by the Mexico-United States border. The film was acquired by The Guardian and by Latino Public Broadcasting for PBS Digital Studios. It won the award for Best Web Series at the 31st Imagen Awards as well as a Social Impact Media Award.

In 2016, she produced her first feature-length documentary, Sands of Silence: Waves of Courage, a film that addresses the full spectrum of sexual violence, from child sexual abuse and priest abuse to sexual assault and sex trafficking. The film was executive produced by her husband Mark Stehle and by philanthropist and author Deirdre Roney. The film's team of editors includes Academy Award-winner Kate Amend. It received multiple awards in the Americas and Europe. Alvarez-Stehle has presented it at over 25 film festivals across continents, at multiple universities such as Oxford and Yale, at Bar Associations in the US and Europe, at women's organizations, and in prisons to sexual violence offenders.

Alvarez-Stehle's 2017 documentary about sex trafficking and exploitation, Sands of Silence, was her first feature-length film. In 2018, the Los Angeles Press Club held a screening and Q&A of the film moderated by Patt Morrison of the Los Angeles Times.

Presented in 2017 at the High Level Political Forum on Sustainable Development at the United Nations, New York, along with Equality Now and UN Women.

On the occasion of the International Day for the Elimination of Violence Against Women, by the Group of the Progressive Alliance of Socialists and Democrats (S&D) and the PES Women (Party of European Socialists) invited the director to present the film at the European Parliament.

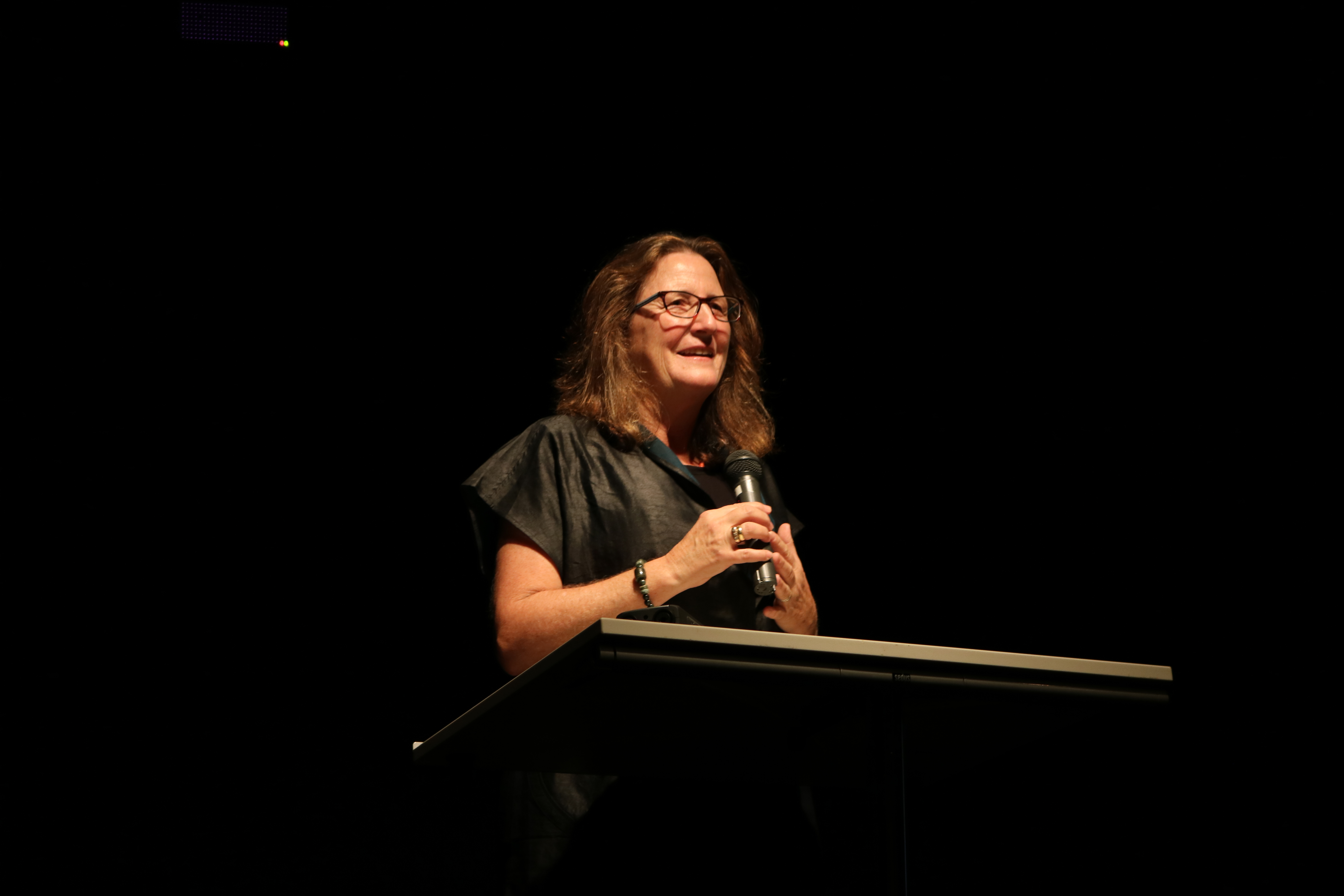
Chelo Álvarez-Stehle at Instituto Cervantes in Tokyo, 2018.

Broadcast on RTVE's "La noche temática" show on November 25, 2017, under its Spanish title "Arenas de Silencio", also on the occasion of the International Day for the Elimination of Violence Against Women.

In 2018, the Los Angeles Press Club organized a presentation and discussion of Sands of Silence moderated by journalist Patt Morrison of The Los Angeles Times.

In 2021, South African publisher Quinton van der Burgh Media, publishes the portrait book 100 Making A Difference, an initiative of Hollywood photographer John Russo, featuring one hundred people and organizations leading social projects, from celebrities like George Clooney, to activists like Malala Yousafzai, and including among them Chelo Alvarez-Stehle and Virginia Isaías, protagonist of the documentary Arenas of Silence and founder of the Survivors of Human Trafficking Foundation.

In 2022, the book Las semillas de Atenea - Historias de Mujeres Brillantes 2, published by the Concejalía de Igualdad del Ayuntamiento de Logroño, dedicates a chapter, written by Pío García Tricio and illustrated by Andrea Acedo Bueno, to Chelo Alvarez-Stehle's work as a documentary filmmaker focusing on her documentary Sands of Silence (Arenas de Silencio).

== Selected works ==
=== Documentary films ===
- Tin Girls (Niñas de Hojalata) (2003). [film] On child trafficking in the Himalayas. Produced by: Canal +, Sogecable. Spain: Miguel Bardem. Chelo was interviewer, assistant director and consultant.
- Wisdom in Smoke (Saber a Tabaco) (2006). [short documentary] On the dying figure of Cuba's tobacco factory reader. Produced by EICTV. Cuba: Chelo Alvarez-Stehle et al.
- The Power of 2 (La fuerza de 2) (2006). [short documentary] A group of Cubans searching for inner peace. Produced by innerLENS Productions. Distributed by Visions International. USA/Cuba: Chelo Alvarez-Stehle.
- Sold in America: A Modern-day Tale of Sex Slavery (2009). [short documentary] Produced by C. Alvarez-Stehle and C. Lutz. USA: Chelo Alvarez-Stehle.
- An Intimate Look at Occupy LA (2011). [short documentary] Produced by C. Alvarez-Stehle. USA: Chelo Alvarez-Stehle. The Huffington Post.
- Sands of Silence: Waves of Courage (2016). [film] Produced by innerLENS Productions. USA: Chelo Alvarez-Stehle, producer/director/writer.
- Through the Wall (2016). [short documentary] On a family divided by the U.S./Mexico border. Produced by Chelo Alvarez-Stehle and Tim Nackashi. USA: Tim Nackashi.
- Montse Watkins: Kamakura Tales. [film] In development. Produced by Chelo Alvarez-Stehle. Spain: Chelo Alvarez-Stehle.
- Green SuperHeroes 2030 (2024). [film] A group of 10 young environmentalists changing the world. Produced by Los Angeles Barea and Chelo Alvarez-Stehle USA: Los Angeles Barea.

=== New media ===
- SOS_SLAVES: Changing the Trafficking Game, a social impact video game on sex-trafficking

=== Books ===
- Regiones Imaginarias: En busca de los lugares míticos de la literatura (Imaginary Regions: In search of literature's mythic places) Alvarez-Stehle, C. (2022). Ser tan blanca (Being so white) - Yoknapatawpha. En: Alvarez-Stehle, C. et al: Regiones Imaginarias: En busca de los lugares míticos de la literatura (Imaginary Regions: In search of literature's mythic places). 1st. ed. Spain: Ediciones Menguantes, pp. 17–37. ISBN 978-84-124339-2-0
- Periodismo, Derechos Humanos, Migración y Fronteras: Vigencia y Legado de Ryszard Kapuscinski (Journalism, Human Rights, Migration and Borders: Validity and Legacy of Ryszard Kapuscinski). Álvarez-Stehle, C. (2017). Sands of Silence: Waves of Courage. En: J. González-Esteban y C. López-Rico, ed., Periodismo, Derechos Humanos, Migración y Fronteras: Vigencia y Legado de Ryszard Kapuscinski (Journalism, Human Rights, Migration and Borders: Validity and Legacy of Ryszard Kapuscinski), 1st ed. Murcia, Spain: Universidad Miguel Hernández de Elche. Diego Marín Librero, pp. 141–172. ISBN 978-84-17306-21-2
- Tras los pasos de Montse Watkins (On Montse Watkins' footsteps). Álvarez, C. (2006). Montse desde quienes la conocieron. En: Tras los pasos de Montse Watkins Autor: Fernando C. Hiriarte Tirone (1st. ed., pp. 47–64). Buenos Aires, Argentina: Agencia Periodística CID – Diario del Viajero®.

=== Book translation & editing ===
- Memoria e identidad: Conversaciones al filo de dos milenios (2005) (Memory and Identity: Conversations at the Dawn of a Millennium. Pope John Paul II, Rizzoli). Editing. ISBN 978-08-4782-777-0.
- Guía de las Colecciones del Museo de Arte de Filadelfia.(2002).(Philadelphia Museum of Art Handbook), 1st ed. Philadelphia: Philadelphia Museum of Art. Editing. ISBN 08-7633-158-4.
- Y si... (If...) Perry, S. (1995). Los Angeles, Calif.: J. Paul Getty Museum. Translation. ISBN 978-08-9236-542-5.
- Guía de las ColeccionesMuseo J. Paul Getty (Handbook of the Collections), (1995). 1st ed. Malibu, Calif.: J. Paul Getty Museum. Editing. ISBN 978-08-9236-328-5.
- Astrología y religión en el mundo grecorromano (1989) (Astrology and Religion Among the Greeks and Romans), Cumont, F (1994). Barcelona: Edicomunicación, S.A. Translation. ISBN 978-84-7672-227-5.
- La nube de lo desconocido (1987). (The cloud of unknowing, 14th century, Anonymous). Barcelona: Edicomunicación, S.A. Translation. ISBN 978-84-7672-135-3.

=== Awards ===
==== Human Rights ====
- "2022 Human Rights Award" granted by the Observatory for Human Rights of the Government of La Rioja

==== Equality ====
- "Equality Award Teresa León Goyri - City of Logroño" 2022

==== Journalism ====
- 2017 "Sands of Silence: Waves of Courage" Documentary Film: 59th Southern California Journalism Awards Best Feature Documentary by the Los Angeles Press Club.
- 2002 "The Devil's Water" (originally published as "El agua del diablo," Planeta Humano magazine, Spain). Reuters/IUCIN The World Conservation Union Award - Shortlisted.

==== Film ====
Sands of Silence: Waves of Courage" Feature-length documentary. Spanish title: Arenas de Silencio: Olas de Valor.

- 2020 Malvinas Award — Festival del Cinema Latinoamericano di Trieste, Italy.
- 2018 Women Struggle & Rights Awards — Porto Femme Film Festival, Portugal.
- 2017 Best Documentary Feature — Southern California Journalism Awards - Los Angeles Press Club, California, USA
- 2017 Best Documentary Humanitarian - The WIFTs (Women in Film and Television), West Hollywood, California, USA
- 2017 Best Documentary Nominee — 32nd Imagen Awards, Hollywood, California, USA
- 2017 Second Prize — Premio fada a la Cultura (Cultural Award against Sexual Abuse) by Fundació Vicki Bernadet. Barcelona, Spain
- 2017 Golden Iguana & Best Documentary — Guayaquil International Film Festival, Ecuador
- 2017 Best Documentary - Honorary Mention — Festival Brasil de Cinema Internacional. Rio de Janeiro, Brazil.
- 2016 Best Feature Documentary Audience Award — Awareness Film Festival, Los Angeles, USA
- 2016 First Prize & Silver Biznaga - Asserting Women's Rights — Málaga Film Festival, Málaga, Spain.

"Through the Wall". Short Documentary. Spanish title: "A través del muro".

- 2016 Best Web Series — 31st. Imagen Awards – Winner Best Web Series, California, USA2017 SIMA Award – Social Impact Media Awards, Los Angeles, California, USA
- 2017 Critic's Award — Sebastopol Documentary Film Festival, California, USA
- 2017 Special Jury Prize — Oxford Film Festival, Mississippi, USA
- 2017 Second Winner — 2016 New Filmmakers from Spain, Los Angeles, California, USA
