= ABC Nepal =

Nepalese women's rights organization

- Abbreviation: Agro-forestry Basic Health and Cooperative Nepal
- Formation: 1987
- Founder: Durga Ghimire
- Type: Non-profit organization
- Headquarters: Kathmandu
- Location: Nepal
- President: Mina Khatry
- Website: https://www.abcnepal.org.np

Agroforestry, Basic Health, and Cooperative Nepal (ABC Nepal) is a nonprofit, non-governmental organisation working in Nepal that focuses on women's rights and works against human trafficking in Nepal. Created in 1987 by Durga Ghimire, ABC Nepal was among the first Non-Governmental Organisations established in Nepal. It was registered soon after the introduction of Nepalese multiparty democracy in 1991. The president of the organisation is Mina Khatry.

== History ==
In 1991, ABC Nepal was the first Nepalese organisation to bring the subject of human trafficking to the national level by hosting conferences on trafficking of teenage girls and Nepalese sex slavery. It has been among the leading organisations in this field, and ABC Nepal was the first Nepalese organisation to raise the issue of human trafficking on a national level, and did so by organizing conferences about the trafficking of underage girls and sex slavery in Nepal in 1991. It is one of the leading organisations working in this field, and the combined efforts of ABC Nepal other organisations have led to the creation and implementation of various laws regarding women rights and human trafficking.

ABC Nepal played a part in the rescue of 35 girls from the Apollo circus in New Delhi in 1996. It has also helped to rescue girls working as a sex slaves in Indian brothels and to rehabilitate them into society.

ABC Nepal has worked to prevent trafficking in women and children by generating social awareness especially among rural people, and by conducting border monitoring and cross border programs.

== Focus area of work ==
Many commercial sex workers in India are Nepalese women, including many underage girls. A 1995 report published by Human Rights Watch indicated that almost half of the women working in brothels in Mumbai were Nepalese. Girls who lack an education may be tempted to move to the city; in many cases, they are deceived into believing that there will be a lucrative job or marriage prospects, only to find that they have been sold to a brothel, where they are kept for years as bonded labour. According to Human Rights Watch, escape is nearly impossible due to the constant surveillance, and the corruption prevalent among both the police and governments of India and Nepal. The girls' unsavory work makes them unacceptable to society, which greatly hinders the girls' reintegration and repatriation.

Aside from sexual exploitation, girls have been trafficked for other reasons, including to have their kidneys sold, to be forced into marriage, or to work as domestic workers and cheap labourers in various parts of India.

With changing public perspectives about of migration, the rising level of awareness among women, and the shift of trafficking pattern in Nepal, ABC Nepal has focused on eliminating the trafficking of girls beyond India, especially in Saudi Arabia. Many girls lured by a dream of a better world and job follow the path led by unauthorized dealers and traffickers and end up being sexually exploited and enslaved.

== Programs and activities ==
ABC Nepal has provided income-generating training to rural women and victims of trafficking to help them reduce their poverty and improve their living standard. It has formed over 300 women cooperative groups. ABC Nepal also has promoted self-reliance, self-confidence and leadership skills in women by economic empowerment, vocational training, and non formal education. The nonprofit focuses on reproductive health, providing education to secondary school children and operating health clinics and safe abortion campaigns. It has placed a special focus on HIV/AIDS prevention and awareness. The group enhances leadership in women and increases the participation of affected women at local, regional, and national levels. It also provides legal protection and can represent victims in legal processes.

ABC Nepal has operated rehabilitation homes in Kathmandu, Bhairahawa, and Biratnagar to provide shelter to victims of trafficking and violence against women.

ABC Nepal has raised awareness for safe migration. For example, the group monitored the Tribhuvan International Airport, establishing a help desk in major border transit of Bhairahawa. The rehabilitation and reintegration programs have yielded positive results.

== Geographical area coverage ==
The organization covers eastern, central and western development regions.

=== Eastern development region ===
- Morang
- Siraha
- Sunsari

=== Central development region ===
- Bhaktapur
- Sindhuli
- Dhading
- Lalitpur
- Kathmandu
- Nuwakot
- Sindhupalchok
- Bara
- Chitwan
- Makwanpur
- Parsa
- Rautahat
- Dhanusha
- Mahottari
- Ramechhap
- Sarlahi

=== Western development region ===
- Kapilvasu
- Nawalparasi
- Rupendehi

== Publications ==
The organization has published or contributed to several books, audio cassettes, and other publications.

Red Light Traffic, a book by ABC Nepal

=== Books ===
- Red Light Traffic (English) consist of 8 articles written by experts on the status of women, girl trafficking and AIDS, including case studies.
- ऐड्स को आतंक (Terror of AIDS)
- चेलीवेटिको देहव्यापर र ऐड्स (Girls Trafficking and AIDS – An introduction)
- चेलीवेटी को देहव्यापार र यसको विविध परिचय (Girls Trafficking and its Various Aspects)
- ऐड्स को तथ्यपूर्ण जानकारी (Fact Information of AIDS)
- A Situation Analysis Report on “Girls Trafficking in Sindhupalchowk” (English)
- चेली को आवाज (Daughters’ Voice)
- शक्ति (power) (Song in Nepali)
- शक्ति (booklet in Tamang language)
- महिला सशक्तिकरणको लागि सहकारिता (Cooperative for Women Empowerment)
- चेलिवेटिको आफ्नो कथा (Story books with Sketches for those illiterate with little education- Daughters’ Own Story)
- माइति फर्केका चेलिहरु (Real story of Rescued Girls who had rescued from Indian Brothels by NGO)
- Life In Hell (English Version of माइति फर्केका चेलिहरु)
- Sexual Exploitation of Nepalese Girls (in English Version – with special reference to girls trafficking)
- Political Empowerment of Women (English)
- सुखि परिवारिक जिवनका लागि सहकारि (Cooperative for Happy Family Life)
- Women Leadership Training Report (English)
- बेचिएका चेलिहरुको लागि सरकारि तथ गैर् सरकारि संस्थाहरुको प्रयास (Initiation of GO & NGO for Trafficked girls with special reference to published news by media)
- Report on " चेलिवेटि बेचबिखन को सन्दर्भ र मानव अधिकार को प्रश्न" (Girls trafficking and the Question of Human Rights)
- Report on " राष्ट्रिय सामाजिक प्रतिबद्धता" (National Social)
- Booklet regarding human rights (English)
- Booklet regarding Trafficking, HIV/AIDS and Cooperatives (English)
- दिगो शान्ति व्यवस्थापन का लागि महिला नेतित्व विकास तालिम् पुस्तिका (Women leadership training manual for sustainable peace development)
- चेलिवेटि बेचबिखन् तथा महिला हिंसा को वर्तमान अवस्था (Current Status of girls trafficking and violence against women)

=== Audio cassettes ===
- चेली को आवाज (Daughters’ Voice)
- शक्ति (Power)

=== Video cassettes ===
- चेली को आवाज (Daughter’s Voice)
- Samjhauta (How to compromise AIDS victims in family)
- Abhiyan,
- Shakti (Visual song-Nabechha Hamilai)

=== Posters ===
- AIDS
- Heart shape (message about AIDS)
- Girls trafficking
- Safe migration
