= Charimaya Tamang =

Nepalese activist

- Awards: 2011 Hero Acting to End Modern-Day Slavery Award by US Secretary of State Hillary Rodham Clinton

Charimaya ("Anu") Tamang is a recipient of the Hero Acting to End Modern-Day Slavery Award 2011, founder of Shakti Samuha which has been awarded the Ramon Magsaysay Award 2013. She was born into a poor family and sold to India when she was 16 years to work in a brothel as a sex worker. She spent 22 months in a brothel before the Indian government rescued her along with over 200 other Nepali women in 1996. Upon her return to Nepal, Tamang was ostracised by her community.

Later in 2000, Tamang and 15 other survivors established Shakti Samuha, an anti-trafficking NGO.

== Awards ==
- 2011 Hero Acting to End Modern-Day Slavery Award by Former US Secretary of State Hillary Rodham Clinton
- National Gorimaya Woman Genius Award

== Media ==
Charimaya ("Anu") Tamang's story appeared for the first time in 1999 in the Spanish monthly magazine Planeta Humano, "Girl Child-trafficking. When No Means Never Again".

In 2003, her story was further developed in the documentary film Tin Girls (Niñas de Hojalata), directed by Miguel Bardem, produced by Canal+ Spain and sold to public broadcaster RTVE.

In 2016, the documentary film Sands of Silence: Waves of Courage, directed by Chelo Alvarez-Stehle, featured Anu Tamang reacting to her Hero Acting to End Modern-Day Slavery Award, presented to her by Hillary Clinton in Washington D.C. in 2011, and following her current work as an anti-trafficking activist.
