= Durga Ghimire =

Nepalese social worker (born 12 May 1948)

- दुर्गा घिमिरे
- Born: Durga Acharya; 12 May 1948 (age 77); Biratnagar, Morang, Kingdom of Nepal
- Occupation: Social activist
- Spouse: Jagadish Ghimire
- Parents: Ganesh Acharya (father); Shanta Acharya (mother)
- Relatives: Mahesh Acharya (Brother)

Durga Ghimire (born 12 May 1948) is a Nepalese social worker and president of ABC Nepal, a non-profit organization working in the field of women welfare and anti trafficking.

== Early life and education ==
She was born on 12 May 1948 as a 5th child of father Ganesh Acharya and mother Shanta Acharya in Nepal's eastern city of Biratnagar. She has a Masters in Arts degree in Economics and Bachelors degree in Law (BL) from Tribhuwan University. She was married to Jagadish Ghimire, an eminent author, development worker and political analyst in Nepal.

== Works ==
Besides being a social activist, she is also an author and writer. She has written several literary books and articles on women, women health trafficking and safe migration. She also presents papers on national, regional and international conferences, research articles in journals on the issues of women right, women empowerment, trafficking of girls and sex slavery. She was involved in student politics in the early part of her life and was jailed thrice for about thirteen months. She also serves as consultant for drafting new policies and plans related to issues of women and girls trafficking in Nepal.

She has served for Centre for economic development and administration (CEDA), and Social Welfare Council of Nepal. During her stay in London with her husband, she worked for BBC Nepali Service as a news reader.

She together with Prativa Subedi and Mira Aryal had started ABC Nepal initially intended to work in the field of Agroforestry, basic health and cooperative but later on realized the fact that they should be working against women rights and act for the girls being sold in Indian brothels and save them from their life in hell and focus towards anti trafficking campaigns.

She is also the co-founder of Tamakoshi Sewa Samiti (TSS) that works in the rural villages of Ramechhap district of Nepal. It basically works to promotes the social lifestyle of people by improving their access to clean drinking water, gainful employment opportunities, better agriculture technique development and easy access to health facilities and educational services.

Besides being the founding president of ABC Nepal, she is also the vice president of the Women Force Group, vice president of CAPWIP(Center for Asia Pacific Women in Politics) Founding member of the National Network Against Girls Trafficking (NNAGT) and Vice president of the Center for Asia Pacific Women in Politics (CASP).

== International Recognitions and Awards ==
- Help for Self Help Award 2012, Strømme Foundation
- Reflection of Hope Award 2006, Oklahoma City National Memorial and Museum

== Books ==
- Unko Samjhana
- Jailko Samjhana
- Staying Alive: Memories of women in prison
- Prevention, Care, Repatriation and Re-integration of Rescued Girls (ABC/Nepal's experience)
- Cheliko Katha ra Bethaharu, Mera Abubhuti (The stories of daughters, My experiences)
- Chelibeti Bechbikhan ra Mahila Hinsa ko Bartaman Awastha (Current situation of girls trafficking and violence against women)(Collection of paper presented by Durga Ghimre)
- Sexual Exploitation of Nepalese Girls (with special reference to girls trafficking)

== Personal life ==
She was married to Jagadish Ghimire, till his death in 2013.
