= Shakti Samuha =

Non-profit organization

- Services: Support for the victim of women trafficking and enslavement
- Website: shaktisamuha.org.np

Shakti Samuha is a non-profit organisation working against women trafficking. It is based in Nepal and was formed by the survivors of women trafficking in India, including Charimaya Tamang. The organisation is a recipient of the Ramon Magsaysay Award 2013.

== Background ==
India operated a massive raid in illegal brothels and enslavements in 1996 and rescued 500 women including 128 of Nepalese background. These women realised they need an organisation to support other women in the similar situations and together they formed Shakti Samuha in 1996 and registered in 2000.
