= Julie Casper Roth =

American filmmaker and artist

- Born: Julie E. Casper
- Occupation(s): Artist, filmmaker, experimental video artist, writer

Julie Casper Roth (born Julie E. Casper), is an American artist, documentary filmmaker, experimental video artist, and writer based in Connecticut.

== Career ==
Casper Roth's work has been presented at many venues, including the MadCat International Women's Film Festival (2007, Object Lessons, West Coast premier), the Athens International Film and Video Festival, Chicago Reeling Lesbian and Gay International Film Festival, Dumbo Art Under the Bridge Festival, and the Southwest Gay and Lesbian Film Festival and Anthology Film Archives.

In addition, Casper Roth's work has been screened in gallery settings including Artists’ Television Access in San Francisco and the SCOPE Art Fair held at Lincoln Center and in Basel, Switzerland. She won 2nd Place in the experimental category in the 2008 Athens International Film and Video Festival. In 2011, she screened Housewives: Left Alone! at the video_dumbo video festival held in conjunction with the 2011 DUMBO Arts Festival. In 2008, she screened "A Matter of Fiction" at the video_dumbo video festival as part of the 2008 DUMBO Arts Festival in Brooklyn, NY.

In 2008, the Smith College alumnae magazine wrote that, "[Roth's] work has steadily gained national exposure since her graduation from Smith" in 2007. And the March 2008 issue of the Smith alum magazine contained a follow-up feature about Casper Roth entitled, "Alum Filmmaker Getting National Exposure." In 2007, The Chicago Traveler magazine mentioned Casper Roth's screening of "Tokens" as one of the highlights of the 2007 Chicago Reeling Lesbian and Gay International Film Festival.

As of 2015, Casper Roth was a producer/director at WMHT-PBS where she created documentary content and was the initial producer for AHA! A House of Arts, a weekly television arts program. Her documentary Out in Albany was the first documentary aired on public television to highlight the history and contemporary work of the Albany, NY Capital Region's LGBTQ community.

== Filmography ==
- Object Lesson [short] (2006)
- Physical Biography [3:30 min.] (2007)
- Tokens [18:00 min.] (2007)
- A Matter of Fiction [3:50 min.] (2008)
- Speaking with My Mouth Closed [short] (2009)
- Soothsayers: The Oil Loop [short] (2010)
- The Main [feature-length documentary] (2010)
- Lying Eyes [short] (2011)
- I Am Stein [10:13 min.] (2011)
- Housewives: Left Alone! [4:00 min.] (2011)
- The Animal Underground [4:57 min.] (2011)
- Paper Pills [in-progress short] (2011–2012)
- The Veil (2012)
- NT [feature screenplay] (2012)
- The Albany Academies [documentary] (2013)
- AHA! A House of Arts [television series] (producer-2014)
- Out in Albany [documentary] (2015)
- The Cake is a Lie [short fictional narrative] (2015)
- Beneath Gaslights [feature screenplay] (2014-2015)
- "Rooted Out" [documentary] (2022)

== Music videos ==
- "More", by Low

== Awards ==
- In 2021, Casper Roth was the recipient of a NYSCA Individual Artist grant.
- In 2012 and 2014, Casper Roth was a finalist for the Sundance Screenwriters Lab.
- In 2012, she was awarded a Professional Development Fellowship in Visual Arts from the College Art Association, one of only five MFA students in the U.S. to receive this award.
- In 2011, she was awarded a Research Grant for an experimental video project from University at Albany MFA program.
- In 2010, she was awarded a Strategic Opportunity Stipend grant from the New York Foundation on the Arts.
- In 2008, she was named as a New York Foundation for the Arts Fellow in Video.
- In 2008, NYFA also named her as an award recipient in the NYFA MARK program.
- In 2008, she won 2nd Place in the Experimental Category in the Athens International Film and Video Festival.
- In 2007, she won the "Best Experimental Film" and the "Best Film of Smith College" awards at the Five College Film Festival.
- In 2007, she was awarded a Strategic Opportunity Stipend grant from the New York Foundation on the Arts.
- In 2006, she was named as a Finalist for the Short Screenplay category in the Ivy Film Festival.

== Personal life ==
Julie Casper Roth graduated cum laude from Smith College in Northampton, Massachusetts. She resides in Connecticut.

== See also ==
- List of lesbian filmmakers
- List of LGBT-related films directed by women
