= Human trafficking in Nepal =

Human trafficking in Nepal is a growing criminal industry affecting multiple other countries beyond Nepal, primarily across Asia and the Middle East. Nepal is mainly a source country for men, women and children subjected to the forced labor and sex trafficking. U.S. State Department's Office to Monitor and Combat Trafficking in Persons placed the country in "Tier 2" in 2017.

== Overview of human trafficking ==
Human trafficking is the fastest growing criminal industry in the world, second to drug dealing and tied with arms dealing. According to the United Nations Office on Drugs and Crime, human trafficking is the acquisition of people by improper means such as deception, force, or fraud, with the goal of exploiting them. All countries are affected as source or destination countries or a combination of both, although developing countries tend to be source countries for developed nations. According to a conservative estimate by the International Labour Organization, around 2.4 million people—overwhelmingly women and girls—are currently in forced labor as a result of trafficking, creating a US$32 billion industry worldwide. Annually, approximately 600,000–800,000 people are trafficked across national borders around the world, 80 percent of whom are women and girls. Around 1.2 million victims of trafficking are minors: around 43% are trafficked for commercial sexual exploitation while 32% are for involuntary servitude, and 25% for a mixture of both. Nepali victims are trafficked within Nepal, the Middle East, and even Europe plus other areas such as Malaysia and forced to become prostitutes, domestic servants, beggars, factory workers, mine workers, circus performers, child soldiers, and others.

The process of human trafficking can be explained by two models: "hard" and "soft". The distinction between hard and soft trafficking has to do with the coercion or complicity of family members in the entry of a person into forced prostitution. Hard trafficking is conducted through false promises and coercion. It spreads from district to district, and has shifted significantly from rural to urban areas. In soft trafficking, family members can play roles beyond "seller", including transporter and purchaser.

== Destinations ==
=== Within Nepal ===
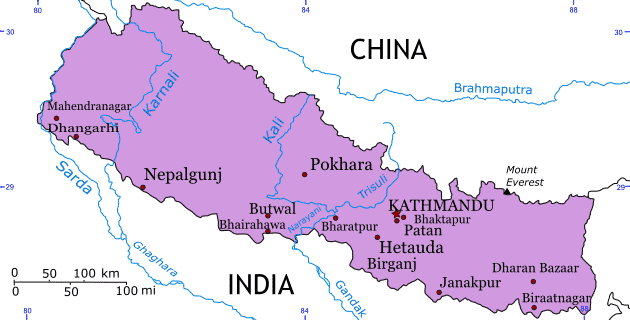
Map of Nepal

Trafficking victims often are taken to locations within Nepal, often from rural areas to the urban centers. Mainly young girls and women are trafficked for sexual exploitation in places such as cabin/dance restaurants, massage parlors, and other places within the tourism sector. However, these spaces also host many women who entered sex work voluntarily, and those who might have entered voluntarily but were later not allowed to leave and end up in slave-like conditions. Within Nepal, labor trafficking is also common: victims often end up in carpet and garment factories, embroidering sweatshops, brick-kilns, and others.

=== Cross-border to India ===
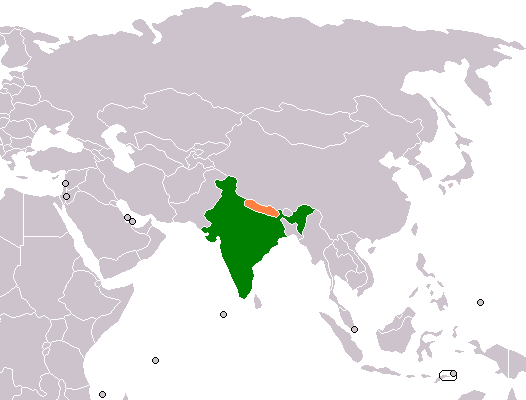
The Nepal-India border is one of the busiest sites for human trafficking.

The trafficking of girls from Nepal into India for forced prostitution is perhaps one of the busiest slave trafficking routes anywhere in the world, with an estimated 5,000-10,000 Nepali women and girls trafficked to India each year. An estimated 100,000–200,000 Nepali trafficked persons are in India. Victims are also trafficked for labor in circuses, agriculture, and manufacturing sectors. The 1850 kilometers of open, porous border between Nepal and India make trafficking simple and difficult to catch. In addition, there is no immigration control for Nepalese migrating to India or Indians coming into Nepal under the 1950 Peace and Friendship Treaty between India and Nepal. In addition to being a destination, India is also a transit country for Nepalese and Bangladeshi women trafficked to Pakistan, Western Asia, and the Middle East and for women trafficked from the Russian Federation to Thailand.

Nepal's open international border with India provides human traffickers with easy access to transport victims across the border undetected. According to the Office of the National Rapporteur on Trafficking in Women and Children, quoted by Gurung and Kachchhap, "There is no required passport and visa resulting in easy passage. With [fewer] rules and regulations in place, the border becomes an easy pass with falsified documents and paperwork. Consequently, it is easy for traffickers to lure Nepali women and children and transport them across the border into India. This largely unsupervised boundary facilitates human trafficking, with India serving as both a transit and destination country for victims of this inhumane crime.

=== Cross-border (excluding India) ===
Victims, especially girls and women, are trafficked to Saudi Arabia, Malaysia, Hong Kong, Russia, Pakistan, the United Arab Emirates and other Gulf states. Experts believe China is also becoming an emerging hub for Nepali victims. Many victims who end up overseas are passed through India first before their final destinations. For non-India foreign destinations, the victims are most commonly subjected to sex trafficking, especially to non-brothels. Also widespread is labor exploitation of victims in unorganized, informal sectors in Gulf states, such as domestic servitude.

== Types of trafficking ==
=== Sex trafficking ===
Sex trafficking is when someone uses coercion, force, or fraud to cause a commercial sex act with an adult or causes a minor to commit a commercial sex act. A commercial sex act includes prostitution, pornography or sexual performance done in exchange for an item of value, such as money, shelter, food, drugs, or clothes.

Sex trafficking is particularly rampant within Nepal and to India, with as many as 5,000–10,000 women and girls trafficked to India alone each year. Those who have been trafficked for sex work are more likely to be older, illiterate, and have fewer family members with earning power. Some reasons for being trafficked for sex work may include poverty and being old enough. Younger female children, on the other hand, tend to also be exploited for non-sex work including domestic and manual labour, and circus work. Girls are sold to brothels at prices ranging from 50,000 to 70,000 Indian rupees. The younger the girl, the higher the price she will be sold for. Once sold, the girls are property of the brothel owner until they can pay back the amount that was paid for them. Girls trafficked for sex work may be provided with a small portion of food and sometimes a small sum of money, however, brothel owners may take up to 90–95% of the girls' earnings. One study reported that girls were forced to serve an average of 14 clients per day, with a minimum of three and a maximum of 40 men.

=== Forced labor ===
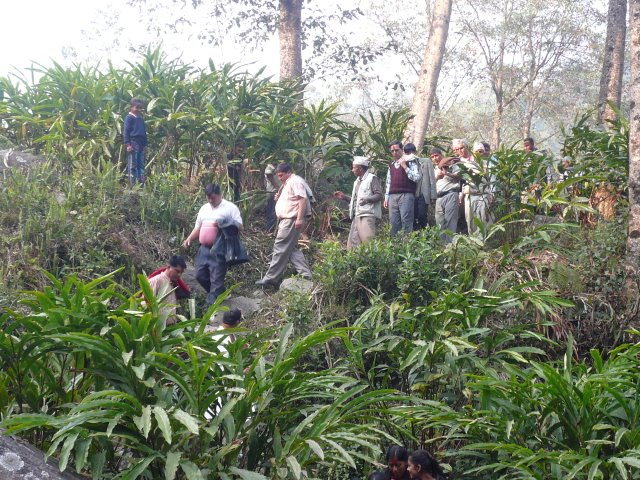
Forced labor in Nepal is commonly seen in agriculture.

Forced labor refers to "situations in which persons are coerced to work through the use of violence or intimidation, or by more subtle means such as accumulated debt, retention of identity papers, or threats of denunciation to immigrant authorities." Elements of forced labor include deception, exploitation and abuse, violating the International Labour Organization Declaration on Fundamental Principles and Rights at Work, adopted in 1998. In Nepal, slavery was one of the oldest forms of forced labor. Since forced labor is mostly hidden in the illicit economy, there is a lack of precise quantitative data to form an accurate measure of its extent.

One specific type of forced labor that is widespread in Nepal is bonded labor, also known as debt bondage. Even though Nepal outlawed bonded labor in 2000, it is still an issue throughout the country. Bonded labor is designed to exploit workers, and happens when individuals give themselves into slavery as a means of repayment for a loan. The individual is then tricked or trapped into working for very little or no pay, as they find that repayment of the loan is impossible. Most workers are not allowed to work for anyone else. Violence and threats are sometimes used to coerce workers to stay, and in certain cases, they are kept under strict surveillance. In Nepal, bonded labor is mostly seen in agriculture, but it can also be found in brick kilns, domestic work, embroidery workshops, tea shops, and small restaurants.

Child labor is also particularly rampant in Nepal. The country has an estimated 1.6 million child workers between the ages of five and 17 years old, who often work in exchange for money to give to their parents. Approximately three-quarters of them are younger than 14 years old, and most of them are girls.

== Victim characteristics ==
The majority of trafficking victims are women and girls, who are especially vulnerable due to limited economic opportunities, illiteracy or low education, and low socioeconomic and cultural status. Women and girls are also more vulnerable to trafficking if they are involved in marginalized livelihoods, deserted by their husbands or families, victims of abuse and violence, and those from disadvantaged communities and extremely poor families. Victims come from all areas of Nepal, but most targeted are those in traditionally disadvantaged, marginalized groups such as the Dalit caste (untouchables) and ethnic minorities ("janajati", indigenous peoples). Additional vulnerable groups include those of religious minorities, those with disability, those from mid- and far-western development regions, and those residing in an area vulnerable to climate change and natural disasters. The United Nations (2011) classified the most vulnerable groups in Nepal who require the most immediate support through the following three criteria: 1) human development (poverty, economic resources, knowledge and health); 2) exclusion (economic exclusion, political exclusion and civic/cultural exclusion); and 3) weak individual protection (physical protection and legal protection). However, victimization is spreading to advantaged groups and upper caste women as well. The Nepal Human Development Report (2004) estimates approximately 20% who are trafficked to India and other countries in Asia are under the age of 16.

Most victims were lured with promises of better jobs in areas such as India, Dubai, or Saudi Arabia; other tactics include false marriages and proposals, force, and approaching indebted families to sell their daughters to pay their debts, sometimes under the guise of a dowry for a marriage. Girls may be frequently viewed as family commodities who can be bought and sold like property. In the places of enslavement, victims are often imprisoned, followed with guards, routinely sexually and physically abused across different types of trafficking. Victims receive little or no pay for their work, work in dangerous conditions for extremely long periods of time, and are threatened physically and psychologically. Victims are often held in debt bondage by their captors, which means they are forced to pay off a debt for their families or transportation fee. Victims sometimes get away from their captivity through escape, rescue by police raids, or released by their captors when deemed too old to be profitable.

== Trafficker characteristics ==
A 2011 report by Dr. Gilly McKenzie, of UN Organised Crime Office, states: "Traffickers often originate from the same places or localities from where girls and women are trafficked. They are both men and women, and most often they were people the victim knows such as neighbors, relatives, friends, and even parents. Studies show that trafficking are conducted by networks of traffickers, with the network extending from village to working places to the destination. Traffickers have cooperations with politicians, officials, the police, customs, overseas recruiters/agents, transport agencies, adoption agencies etc. Researchers believe the routes, methods and activities of trafficking are becoming increasingly more organized. Traffickers often obtain authentic legal documents for the victims they traffic, but withhold them from the victims after borders are crossed Besides using false promises of well-paying employment, false love, and marriage, traffickers also play the role of "guardians" for girls and women, often under the guise of helping them seek medical treatment or guiding them to reach their husband or relatives in India." In Nepal, the large majority of traffickers are in the age range of 26–35 years, and around 95 percent of traffickers are married. An overwhelmingly majority of traffickers are only literate (84%), without secondary education. For their occupation, most traffickers were involved in agriculture before, followed by wage labor. Traffickers also come from non-agricultural industries including business and service.

== Human trafficking risk factors ==
=== Economic factors ===
Poverty is one of the greatest risk factors that makes victims, particularly women and girls, vulnerable: the Nepali PRSP (Poverty Reduction Strategy Papers) identifies that 38% of its population live on or below the poverty line. Poverty and lack of employment opportunities, particularly in rural areas, force individuals or families to migrate to more urban areas or accept distant job offers. This participation in rural-urban migration increases the risk of being trafficked for many Nepali women and girls. In addition, the rise of the carpet industry in Nepal as the greatest foreign exchange industry created a demand for cheap child labor and slave labor. Studies indicated that a large number of children working in the factories were enslaved and often sexually abused; the factories then became transit centers for trafficking girls to India. Furthermore, trafficking has become a low-risk and highly lucrative business, which incentivizes traffickers to recruit girls, even when they are neighbors or family members.

Extreme poverty in Nepal forces individuals into dire circumstances that increase their vulnerability to human traffickers. Traffickers exploit vulnerable women and children using their desperation for basic needs, such as food, shelter, and employment opportunities. Dr. Phuyal, in his forewords to the Nepal Multidimensional Poverty Index 2021, states that "Nepal has been able to reduce multidimensional poverty from 30.1 percent in 2014 to 17.4 percent in 2019" (ix). However, there is a severe disparity in the distribution of poverty across the country.

In a qualitative study on the experiences of trafficking survivors in Nepal, Dahal et al. noted that "All of the survivors communicated that unmet needs and dreams of overcoming poverty were the major reasons for falling victim to false promises" (3). This underscores the vulnerability of individuals grappling with poverty, who are often lured by promises of better opportunities but instead find themselves exploited and deceived.

Alongside poverty, the lack of education further perpetuates the cycle of vulnerability to human trafficking in Nepal. According to the Nepal Multidimensional Poverty Index 2021, "The deprivations in 'years of schooling' is a large contributor to overall multidimensional poverty in Nepal" (13). Years of schooling refers to the number of years an individual has spent in formal education. When individuals are deprived of sufficient access to education, it can have far-reaching consequences that extend beyond just economic poverty. While the lack of education limits their economic prospects, it also heavily diminishes individuals' awareness of their rights and restricts their ability to make informed decisions to safeguard themselves against exploitation. Limited educational opportunities are a heavy contributor but not the only cause of the lack of education. As Nixon explains, "Many Nepalis, particularly in rural areas, hold fast to the concept that education is unimportant for females" (8). The belief that education is unimportant for females preserves cycles of gender inequality and reinforces discriminatory practices. In an uneducated society, the desire of parents to see their children educated also contributes to the trafficking of children.

=== Cultural factors ===
Historical and cultural factors feed into the current state of trafficking. Children who come from indigenous populations, minority groups, or lower castes are the most vulnerable. The Hindu caste system does not have a prostitute caste: however, in south-west Nepal, women of the Badi caste were traditionally entertainers who offered cultural shows as well as sexual services to local kings, religious leaders and landlords. Trafficker gangs capitalized on this local tradition and incorporated the Badi community into a cross-border sex trafficking ring. Patriarchal social norms, values, attitudes and behaviors encourage trafficking and make women and girls vulnerable. For instance, women have fewer opportunities for education, job training, and employment than men in Nepal; families value boys as assets but view girls as financial burdens because girls will eventually be married off to serve another family, and the parents have to give a dowry in addition. Poor families in these situations might sell their daughters to traffickers or send them off at a young age to work and send remittances back to the family. Tradition, economic needs, and the low status of women work to continue the practice of trafficking. Tolerance of domestic and sexual violence create immense obstacles for victims to leave abusive circumstances or seek effective legal recourse. Furthermore, women who are divorced, abandoned, victims of rape, or sex workers face enormous levels of stigma and are ostracized by their families and communities, making them vulnerable to trafficking.

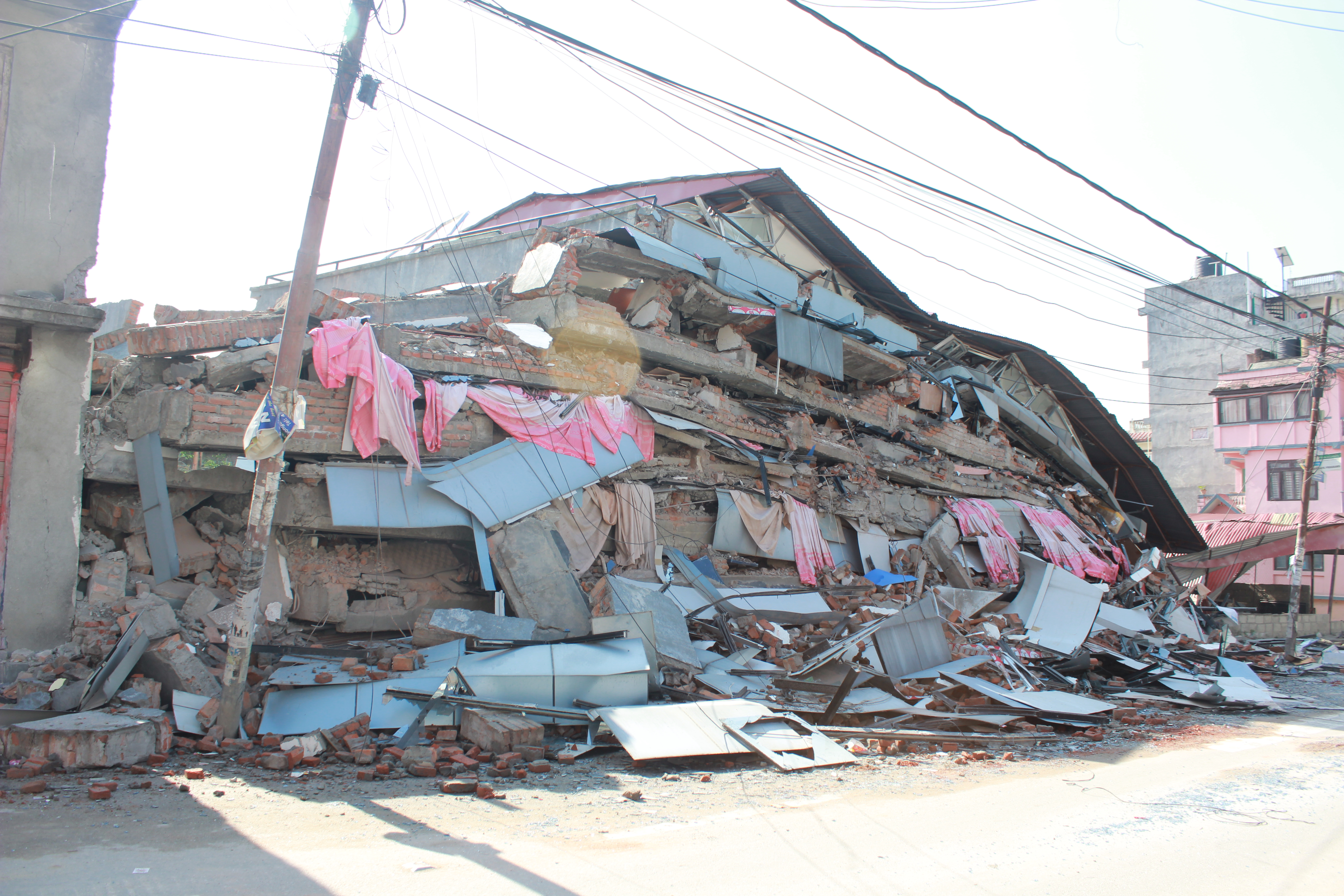
Some of the devastation caused by the 2015 Nepal Earthquake

=== Humanitarian crises ===
The April 2015 Nepal earthquake, its aftershocks have led to fears of intensified trafficking as people prey upon the millions of newly shelterless. The 2015 Nepal blockade has only heightened the sense of crisis in the country. Some showed that 461 girls as reported by Maiti Nepal, most of them were under the age of 18, were reported missing by their families after crossing into India. The political impasse also impacts efforts to engage India authorities to find them.

== Challenges after trafficking ==
Even if victims survive and are able to get out of trafficking, there are many challenges they may face in attempting to return to their normal lives.

=== Health consequences ===
The psychological effects of trafficking are often more neglected than the social and physical consequences, despite its extremely large influence on personal quality of life and on society. Because of the prolonged abuse, victims often suffer from physical and emotional trauma such as post-traumatic stress disorder (PTSD), depression, anxiety, and drug addiction. Female survivors of human trafficking are significantly more vulnerable to depression and anxiety compared to victims of other varieties of traumatic events. Anxiety, depression, and post-traumatic stress disorder tend to have an even higher prevalence in sex workers compared to those trafficked for non-sex work.

Victims are also at a high risk for sexually transmitted infections (STIs) including tuberculosis and HIV/AIDS. According to the 2002 United Nations document "Nepal's National HIV/AIDS Strategy," Nepal has a low HIV prevalence in its general adult population, however, it has a "concentrated epidemic" of HIV with much higher prevalence rates in sex workers. Lack of education about HIV and low condom use contribute to the spread of HIV in Nepal. In 2002, condom use accounted for 1.1% of the total contraceptive use in Nepal. Studies show around 30-38% of sex trafficking victims are HIV positive, a significantly higher rate than non-sex worker rates and non-coerced sex workers. In contrast with non-coerced sex workers, those who have been trafficked may have been forced to have unprotected sexual intercourse with clients, leading to the higher rate of HIV prevalence. Over 50% of the HIV positive women in Nepal are women who were deported after working in the sex industry in India. Once these women have been diagnosed with HIV, they face stigma, rejection, and social isolation, making it harder to reintegrate into society if they do manage to get out of sex work.

=== Reintegrating into society ===
In addition, since many survivors do not have the citizenship status, they have very limited options for legal recourse, and are ineligible for most government poverty reduction programs. Even after being aided by NGOs, many women report continued stigma in the community and lack of opportunities for livelihood.

Many have extreme difficulty reintegrating into society due to the strong stigma they face of being previous sex workers regardless of the fact they were forced into it. When survivors return to home villages, they are often cast out by family members and home communities. Survivors consider marriage to be the most reliable and desired social reintegration strategy; some hide their previous lives and HIV status from their new husbands. Because of the stigma and lack of skills and education, combined with Nepal's limited employment and livelihood opportunities for women that are considered socially acceptable, many survivors re-enter sex work.

== Governmental anti-trafficking efforts ==
=== Legislation ===
Nepal's constitution specifically lists the right to equality and the right to freedom from exploitation. The right against exploitation specifically prohibits the trafficking of persons. Nepal's Muluki Ain is a "comprehensive code relating to civil, criminals, as well as procedural and substantive laws of the kingdom" (Center for Legal Research and Resource Development, 2002, p. 11). A section of the Ain addresses trafficking specifically, and the following are prohibited: trafficking of human beings: an individual is not allowed to be removed from Nepal with the intent to sell; deprivation from legal guardian: someone who is below the age of 16 or mentally ill cannot be forcefully separated from their legal guardian; and slavery and bonded labor. Nepal also has three domestic laws in place that address girl trafficking and forced child labor, including the Labor Act of 1992, the Human Trafficking Control Act of Nepal of 1986, and the National Human Rights Commission Act of 1993. The Human Trafficking Control Act of Nepal of 1986 explicitly criminalizes the selling and buying of human beings and established provisions for rehabilitation and integration for victims. It defines human trafficking as anything that includes i) selling or buying of a person for any purpose; ii) forcing someone into prostitution with or without taking profit; iii) illegal dismembering of human organs and iv) engaging in prostitution. Those found guilty would be sentenced to up 20 years in prison. However, recruitment by deception for the purposes of bonded labor was not criminalized in this act unless it is for prostitution. The act is also criticized for equating sex trafficking with sex work, and for inadequate provisions for compensation and effective protection for plaintiffs who file cases against traffickers. Nepal has not adopted the international Palermo Protocol on Trafficking (2003) that offers the widely accepted working definition of trafficking as the use of force, coercion, and fraud to exploit a person for profit.

=== Problems with enforcement ===
Despite efforts at legislating against trafficking, lack of enforcement remains one of the highest hurdles to combatting trafficking in Nepal. First, governments and society tend to judge the woman guilty of prostitution and minimize the traffickers' role in this crime. Secondly, government police officials are often corrupt; pimps maintain close relations with police and politicians in connection with their trafficking activities. Thirdly, few survivors press charges, reflecting that survivors have little trust towards law enforcement mechanisms or mechanisms are ineffective to bring the survivors to report.

Furthermore, intimidation and harassment of survivors and the witnesses during the case proceedings, lack of survivors' protection mechanisms and lack of confidence in prosecuting and investing among the agencies are reported as the main reasons for low registration of trafficking cases in the courts. This is illustrated by the study of Forum for Women, Law and Development (FWLD) and United Nations Development Fund for Women (UNIFEM) which found that in 70% of trafficking cases, the police submit the investigation report to the Government attorney on the last day of the submission of the investigation report in court – making it delay in the investigation by the Government attorney. The same study identified that 23% of reported trafficking cases of the Government attorney did not appear during the hearing. At the trial level, the cases are delayed by insufficient evidence, excessive delay in court process and non-execution of judgment. In addition, there is gross lacking of awareness on gender issues, lack of conceptual clarity on trafficking issues, lack of skilled human resources, corruption, political pressure and lack of coordination among police and Government attorney. Another explanation to underreporting is that after trafficking raids in India, many women are immediately deported to their homelands before they can give evidence against traffickers. Finally, Nepal's courts also have no jurisdiction over brothel owners in India, who are one of the main drivers of trafficking.

=== Other governmental action ===
In addition to legislation, the Nepali government drafted a National Plan of Action (NPA) against Trafficking in Children and Women for Sexual and Labour Exploitation in 1998 which was revised in 2001. The NPA has identified eight areas of action: i) policy, research and institutional development; ii) legislation and enforcement; iii) awareness creation, advocacy, networking and social mobilization; iv) health and education; v) income and employment generation; vi) rescue and reintegration; vii) trans-border, regional and international issues and viii) monitoring and evaluation. The Ministry of Women, Children and Welfare is tasked with implementing the NPA against trafficking. It is responsible to i) formulate and implementation of plans and policies concerning women, children and social welfare; ii) coordinate and liaison with national and international organisations working in social sector; and iii) ensure protection and promotion of children and women.

The Office of the National Rapporteur on Trafficking in Women and Children (ONRT) was established in 2002 under the National Human Rights Commission (NHRC), whose responsibility is to monitor anti-trafficking initiatives. Various poverty reduction efforts were also put in place by the government in order to address one of the most fundamental causes of trafficking. The government also runs shelters in coordination with NGOs.

Various NGOs in Nepal are focused on programs that work to prevent the trafficking of women and girls, as well as to rehabilitate survivors and help reintegrate them into their communities. Some of most well-known and well-established include Change Nepal , Maiti Nepal, 3 Angels Nepal (www.3angelsnepal.com) ABC Nepal, National Network Against Girl Trafficking (NNAGT) and Shakti Samuha. Their major areas of work include research and documentation of trafficking; advocacy and lobbying for policy reform; awareness raising in the community; establishment of helpline services; establishment and operation of community surveillance system; empowerment of community and vulnerable groups such as girls and women; legal services for survivors; facilitation of cross-border rescue, raids, and repatriation; and establishment of rehabilitation centers for rescued survivors where they can have safe shelter, receive medical and legal aid, counseling, and learn other trade skills.

Anti-trafficking programs in Nepal can be divided into prevention programs, indirect prevention, remediation, and advocacy. Prevention programs include "awareness raising" programs, education about trafficking and safe migration practices, improved opportunities for livelihood, and patrolling the country's borders. These activities are executed through seminars, rallies, street theater performances, prevention camps, peer education, and community support groups. Indirect prevention helps prevent trafficking through other means, including microcredit lending, women's rights programs, education programs for women, and formal schooling for girls. Remediation is focused on the care and support of trafficking survivors, programs for their rehabilitation, and efforts to help reintegrate them into their home communities. Lastly, advocacy involves the prosecution of traffickers and the enforcement of anti-trafficking laws.

=== Criticisms ===
Despite being generally regarded as important and helpful to victims, anti-trafficking NGOs in Nepal are sometimes criticized on their ideology, methods, effectiveness, and transparency. First, despite the large number of organizations in place, most are concentrated in the Kathmandu valley and have limited reach in the rural communities where many victims and the vulnerable reside. Secondly, moralistic ideology can play a large role behind the services offered to the victims, with some NGOs equating sex trafficking with sex work and migration: after brothel raids, sex workers are sometimes forcibly repatriated, even when they are willingly there. Thirdly, some NGOs are accused of limiting the freedom of movement for women as many NGOs often encourage girls to stay in villages and try to restrict voluntary migration, which can be patronizing and limiting to young women's futures. The quality of NGO leaders, and training of counselors have also been questioned. Furthermore, in researcher interviews, survivors in NGO-run shelters were highly critical of the traditional skills training that is offered to them such as sewing and garment-making, which they complain are not sufficient to support themselves in the local economy. Instead the survivors report wanting types of support that they perceive as enabling them to compete in the global market and to have sustainable livelihoods.

On the organizational level, lack of communication and coordination, duplication and competition amongst NGOs which could prove to be limiting for anti-trafficking efforts. Inefficiency in the disbursement of foreign aid to combat trafficking is a major concern: as sex trafficking appeared on the international agenda, the amount of money available for interventions in Nepal increased. The number of NGOs dramatically increased, but accountability and transparency are lacking: no reliable database of NGOs exists, and there is no standard way to track their activities, expenditures, or administrative costs. In the health sector alone, 82% of those NGOs registered are reportedly "inactive". In addition, many have been criticized as top-down and welfare oriented.

Some even argue NGO interventions can inflict greater societal harm. For instance, over-promoting frightening stories of abduction has caused some parents to pull girls out of school for fear of kidnapping on their way to school; in addition, some migrant women lament that because of the sex trafficking awareness campaigns some Nepali associate HIV/AIDS with all migrants returning from India, increasing stigma for migrants.

== Remaining challenges ==
Many challenges remain in combatting trafficking. First, there is a dearth of quantitative data on trafficking, mostly because of its illegal and clandestine nature. Much existing information about sex trafficking in Nepal is reliant on NGO publications; there is still no centralized database system for trafficking in persons by the government or any other organization. Second, there is inadequate coordination between and among actors within the country, and third, it is difficult to generate scientific data due to social sigma attached to trafficking as majority of trafficking involves for sexual exploitation.

Other enduring challenges to combat trafficking are the open-border between Nepal and India, lack of enforcement of laws due to increasingly communal violence, political instability, corruption, inadequate funding and implementation of NPA against trafficking, and less priority of anti-trafficking activities on the Nepali government agenda. Socioeconomic factors such as pervasive poverty, a global economy with demand for cheap and slave labor, and lack of opportunities for Nepali locally continue to drive the cycle of vulnerability. Furthermore, elements of the greater socioeconomic and cultural climate such as gender inequality, stigma, and lack of respect for human rights, especially those of women and children, remain imposing societal obstacles toward fighting trafficking.

== See also ==
- Human trafficking in India
- Human rights
- Sexual slavery
- Slavery
- Trafficking of children
- Transnational efforts to prevent human trafficking
- Unfree labor
- Pir
