= Philip Stehle =

American physicist

Philip McL. Stehle was an American theoretical physicist, professor emeritus at the University of Pittsburgh, who worked as a theoretical physicist in the Manhattan Project under the leadership of J. R. Oppenheimer.

== Personal life ==
Stehle was born on March 3, 1919. He grew up in Montreal, where his father, Raymond L. Stehle, was head of the medical department and a professor of pharmacology and honorary medical librarian at McGill University. Her mother was Marie McLellan. In 1936, he moved to the United States to attend the University of Michigan. There he met Evelyn Hoole of Bronxville, New York, an artist. They married in 1942. They had three children. His wife died in 2012.

He took up furniture-making and produced beautiful pieces for family and friends, while his wife Evelyn became a painter. A skier and a squash-player, Stehle was known among his colleagues for his athleticism.

Stehle died of pneumonia April 29, 2013 in Oakmont, Pennsylvania, US.

== Career ==
In 1940, Stehle earned his bachelor's degree at the University of Michigan. He went on to earn his PhD at Princeton University for his thesis "Star Streaming" under the direction of Howard Percy "Bob" Robertson of the California Institute of Technology.

During World War II, Stehle served in the army as a specialist working in the Manhattan Project as a theoretical physicist.

After his discharge, Dr. Stehle taught for a year at the Harvard University Physics Department, then moved to University of Pittsburgh. Stehle was a member of the Department of Physics and Astronomy at the University of Pittsburgh from 1947 until his retirement in 1989 and twice served as its chairman.

At the time of his death, he was a professor emeritus at the University of Pittsburgh.

He also held a Fulbright Fellowship at the University of Innsbruck on three occasions. While his initial interest lay primarily in the local work on nuclear reactor physics and later on fusion reactor physics, Prof. Stehle already pointed out at this time that it would make sense to enter the new field of laser research and quantum optics. He was very familiar with the future possibilities of laser development and its applications from many discussions with American colleagues. Not least because of this early entry into the field of quantum optics, the University of Innsbruck now enjoys an excellent reputation in quantum physics worldwide. He received an honorary doctorate at the University of Innsbruck in 2003.

He is credited with having set the physics department at the University of Pittsburgh on a productive track of research, for which he was awarded an honorary degree. He is the author of three books on physics and a book on the history of physics in the early twentieth century.

== Books ==
- Classical Mechanics
- Order, Chaos, Order: The Transition from Classical to Quantum Physics "A serious exposition of an intellectually enthralling tale", according to Brian Pippan in Nature 371, 485 (1994.)NATURE
- Solutions manual to accompany Physics: The behavior of particles
- Physics: the behavior of particles. Harper's Physics Series.
- Quantum Mechanics
- From Classical to Quantum Physics

== Articles ==
- Comment on Weinstock’s objection to Newton’s logic. American Journal of Physics.
- Quantum Mechanics. American Journal of Physics.
- Medium-Energy Nuclear Physics: Conference at the University of Pittsburgh
