= Malibu Film Festival =

Malibu International Film Festival
- Location: Malibu, California, United States
- Founded: 1997
- Language: English
- Website: malibufilmfestival.org

Malibu International Film Festival (MIFF) is a film festival and non-profit organization, established in 1997, that showcases independent American and international films. The MIFF line-up includes world premieres and U.S. premieres with the focus on introducing new filmmakers to the film industry.

The festival has honored and featured many major actors and film personalities, including James Cameron and Malcolm McDowell.

== Awards ==
- Best Documentary
- Award for Best Short Film
- Award for Best Live Action Short Film
- Award for Best Animation
- Student Filmmaking Award
- Audience Choice Award for Best Film
- Special Jury Selection
