= Social Impact Media Awards =

SIMA Studios
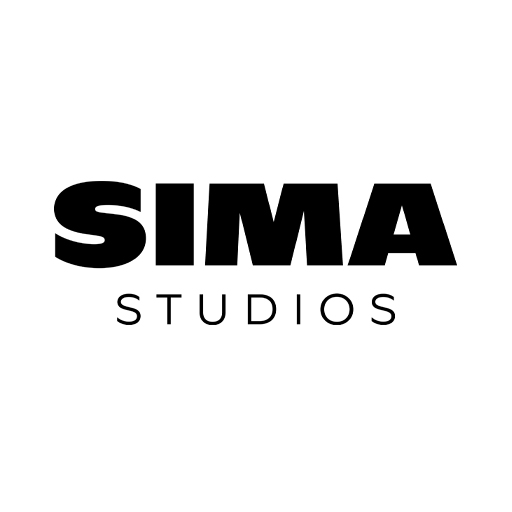
- SIMA Studios Global Impact Media Institute
- Founded: 2012
- Founder: Daniela Kon Lieberberg
- Type: 501(c)(3) nonprofit
- Headquarters: Los Angeles, California, U.S.
- Key people: Daniela Kon Lieberberg (CEO); Erinn Sullivan (CCOO); Virginia Pittaro (Director of Global Partnerships)
- Website: simastudios.org

SIMA Studios, also known as the Social Impact Media Awards (SIMA), is a 501(c)(3) nonprofit impact media institute based in Los Angeles, California. Founded in 2012 by Daniela Kon Lieberberg, SIMA is dedicated to advancing global awareness, human rights, and education through the power of documentary storytelling. SIMA supports filmmakers, educators, and changemakers through an interconnected suite of programs: the annual Social Impact Media Awards (SIMA Awards), SIMA Academy, SIMA Cinema Across Borders, and a Fiscal Sponsorship program.

== History ==
SIMA Studios was founded in 2012 by filmmaker and impact strategist Daniela Kon Lieberberg. It launched with the Social Impact Media Awards, an international documentary film competition spotlighting global human rights and social justice storytelling. In 2015, SIMA launched SIMA Classroom, later rebranded as SIMA Academy in 2022. The Fiscal Sponsorship program was introduced in 2018 to support independent creators seeking funding for impact media projects.

== Programs ==
=== SIMA Awards ===
The Social Impact Media Awards recognize documentary filmmakers and immersive storytellers whose work explores global justice, human rights, and social change. Now in its 14th edition, the awards have honored 630 films and supported over 4,200 filmmakers from 147 countries. Notable past honorees include Academy Award nominees and winners such as "Navalny," "To Kill a Tiger," and "Writing with Fire."

=== SIMA Academy ===
Originally launched as SIMA Classroom in 2015, SIMA Academy is an edtech platform that delivers media literacy and civic education through curated documentary content. Dubbed "the Netflix for changemakers," the platform reaches over 147,000 students and 5,300 educators in 106 countries.

=== SIMA Cinema Across Borders ===
This traveling community screening series delivers impact documentaries to grassroots audiences in the Global South. To date, 59 fellows have facilitated over 600 screenings in 57 countries, reaching more than 200,000 attendees.

=== Fiscal Sponsorship ===
SIMA’s Fiscal Sponsorship program provides independent creators with the legal and financial infrastructure to raise grant funding for non-commercial media projects. As of 2025, SIMA sponsors over 131 active projects, with more than $5 million raised.

== Recognition and Coverage ==
SIMA and its programs have been covered by outlets such as The Guardian, HuffPost, Global Voices, KPBS, and PassBlue. The organization has also been featured in industry platforms including Media Impact Funders, Chicken & Egg Pictures, UNESCO APCEIU, and Lucid Realities.

Third-party evaluation by The Representation Project documents SIMA’s decade-long impact across education, media distribution, and community engagement. SIMA Academy has been recognized by the Anthem Awards and EdTech Digest for its innovation in media literacy and global education.

== Mission ==
SIMA’s mission is to ignite social change through documentary storytelling. The organization leverages media to foster empathy, awareness, and activism in classrooms, communities, and global networks.
