= Aama Samuha =

Nepalese voluntary group

- आमा समूह
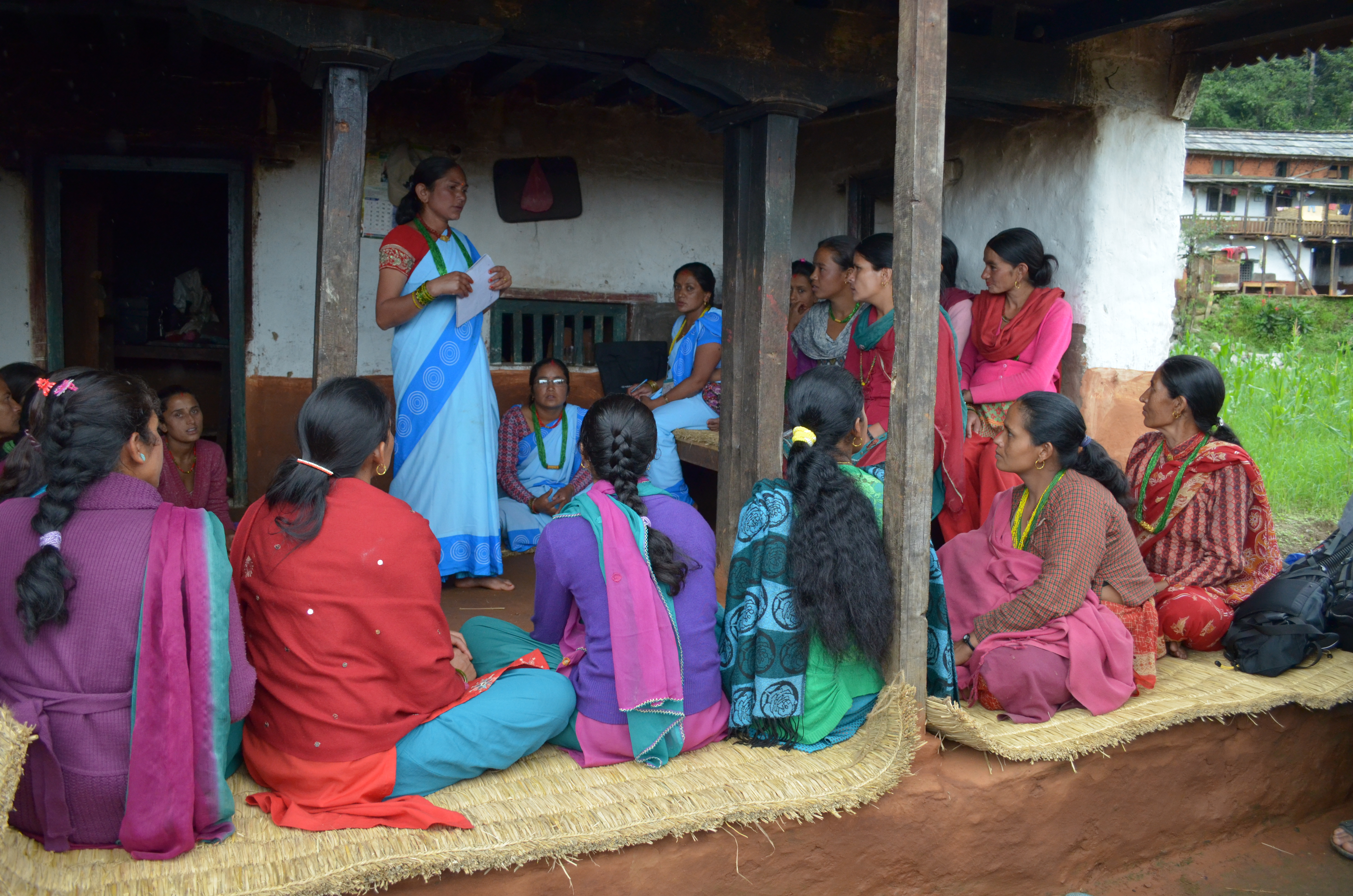
- Aama Samuha in Dolakha District
- Headquarters: numerous
- Location: Nepal

Aama Samuha (Nepali: आमा समूह, lit. 'Mothers' Group') is a Nepalese voluntary group formed to raise awareness about gender equality, issues affecting women and social issues. It was started in Western Nepal by the Gurung people because Gurung men would leave Nepal to join the British Army (Brigade of Gurkhas), and later the Indian Army (Gorkha regiments). Aama Samuha was originally started to "sing, dance and organise cultural activities in the evening."
