= Prayas Nepal =

Nepalize non-profit organization

- Founded: 2003, Nepal
- Purpose: Child rights protection, education and health care for the underprivileged
- Location: Lamtangin Marg, Baluwatar-4, Kathmandu, Nepal
- Region served: Nepal
- Website: https://prayasnepal.org

Prayas Nepal is a non-profit, non-governmental organization in Nepal. It is registered with the District Administrative Office of Kathmandu. Prayas Nepal aims to protect the rights of children and the underprivileged including orphans, women and elderly in Nepal by helping them to access essential services such as education and health care.

== History and development ==
June 2003: Prayas Nepal established the children's home in a rented house with the capacity to accommodate 10 orphans and underprivileged children of Nepal.

2005: In response to the needs and problems of street children in Kathmandu, Prayas Nepal launched a new programme named Children for Children.

March 2005: Due to the increasing number of orphan and abandoned children being accepted, Prayas Nepal acquired its own premises in Baluwatar, Kathmandu, which can accommodate 45 children, with the help of donors.

2006: Prayas Nepal launched its first programme targeting women through supporting female employment – Women Empowerment Program.

July 2007: Responding to the serious floods in some areas of Nepal, Prayas Nepal assisted in the reconstruction of 42 damaged houses in Dhanusa District by providing building materials.

2010: Prayas Nepal started to partner with schools to support their construction and renovation of educational facilities.

== Programmes ==
Children’s Home - Prayas Nepal currently provides basic nutritional and medical support, formal education support, learning excursions and playtime for 38 children at the children’s home.

Sponsorship Programmes - Prayas Nepal offers two types of sponsorship programmes for underprivileged children who live with their own family, namely the full and partial sponsorship programmes. Under the Purna Chhatrabritti (A Full Sponsorship Programme), children can receive overall financial support to complete their one year of schooling. Students granted the Share & Care Sponsorship can obtain partial monetary support from Prayas Nepal according to their need. This sponsorship mainly covers the tuition fee, uniform or school materials of the sponsored child.

Free Community Health Camp Programme - Prayas Nepal has established free medical camps in various rural areas in Nepal where there is no easy access to medical care for the underprivileged including children, women and elderly.

Micro Support (Small Aid) Programme - Prayas Nepal supports local schools’ purchase of learning materials and local small-scale school infrastructure projects, including water tank construction, science lab and library set-up.

Elder Education Programme - Prayas Nepal has organized several literacy classes for the elderly in two districts in Nepal – Dhanusa and Rukum.

Women Empowerment Programme - Prayas Nepal equips female victims of conflict and underprivileged women with literacy classes, counseling sessions and tailoring, knitting, weaving, candle-making, incense-making, pickle-making skills and provides them with necessities including shelter and food.

“Children for Children” - Prayas Nepal has offered counseling services to child street hawkers including drop-outs and drug users to encourage their re-entry to school.

School Construction and Renovation Project - Prayas Nepal assists schools which have inadequate and damaged classrooms and poor facilities with construction and renovation projects by providing technical and financial support including provisions of construction materials. By mid-2014, three projects have been accomplished in three different schools – Shree Nimna Lower Secondary School (Rukum District), Shree Bhumeswori Secondary School (Ramechhap District), and Shree Sunakhani Secondary School (Dhading District).
