= Aamako Ghar =

Nepalese charity for the homeless

Aamako Ghar ("Mother's House," established 1999) is a non-profit organisation established to shelter homeless senior citizens and children of Nepal. It was founded by Dil Shova Shrestha.
