= All Together Now (British TV series) series 1 =

All Together Now
- Series 1
- Presented by: Rob Beckett
- Judges: See The 100
- Winner: Michael Rice
- Runner-up: James Thompson

Release
- Original network: BBC One
- Original release: 27 January – 3 March 2018

Series chronology
- Next → Series 2

All Together Now is a British reality television music competition which first aired on BBC One on 27 January 2018. It is presented by Rob Beckett and Geri Halliwell (credited as Geri Horner). Michael Rice was crowned the winner of the first series on 3 March 2018. A second series was announced on 28 March 2018.

== The Performers ==
The Performers are a mix of soloists and groups. They were cast to include a diverse range of ages, backgrounds and genres, including pop, rock, soul, jazz, musicals, and classical. The casting was open to all and the show attracted performers with minimal public performance experience through to seasoned performers who have appeared on major stages and theatres.

== Performances ==
Result's colour key
Artist advanced to the final with the highest score
Artist did not score enough points to place inside the Top 3
Artist advanced to the sing-off in 2nd and 3rd place

=== Heat 1 (27 January) ===
- Opening song: "I've Got the Music in Me" – The Kiki Dee Band (Solos: Larissa, Maxine, Nigel, Nathaniel, Kiki, James, Milad, Divina, Geri, Mr Fabulous and Lindsay)

Order	Name	Song	Score	Result
1	Rosalie Galvin	"One Night Only" from Dreamgirls	61	1st
2	Gold Kay	"All Night Long" by Lionel Richie	80	1st (Rosalie moved to 2nd)
3	Diamantina	"One Last Time" by Ariana Grande	10	3rd
4	Chrissy Caine	"Nessun Dorma"/"Paradise City" by Giacomo Puccini/Guns N' Roses	83	1st (Gold Kay moved to 2nd, Rosalie moved to 3rd, Diamantina eliminated)
5	George Redwood	"Slow Hands" by Niall Horan	29	Out
6	Nadzira and Yin Yin	"Umbrella" by Rihanna ft. Jay-Z	25	Out
7	Chess Galea	"All That Jazz" from Chicago	61	3rd (Tie between Chess and Rosalie. Chess won 61–39. Rosalie eliminated)
8	The Sundaes	"No More Tears (Enough is Enough)" by Barbra Streisand and Donna Summer	88	1st (Chrissy moved to 2nd, Gold Kay moved to 3rd, Chess eliminated)
9	Luke Davies	"Human" by Rag'n'Bone Man	26	Out
10	The Apple Blossoms	"Wings" by Little Mix	40	Out
11	Alex Attrill	"Your Song" by Elton John	11	Out
12	Benjamin Gillham	"Delilah" by Tom Jones	81	3rd (Gold Kay Eliminated)
13	Michael Rice	"Proud Mary" by Tina Turner	100	1st (The Sundaes moved to 2nd, Chrissy moved to 3rd, Benjamin eliminated)

Michael advanced to the final.

Sing-Off details

Name	Song	Score	Result
Chrissy Caine	"Ain't No Mountain High Enough" by Marvin Gaye & Tammi Terrell	10	Eliminated
The Sundaes	"Shout" by The Isley Brothers	92	Advanced

=== Heat 2 (3 February) ===
- End Song:"Best Song Ever" – One Direction

Running order

Order	Name	Song	Score	Result
1	Tabi Gazele	"Treasure" by Bruno Mars	96	1st
2	Karl Lewis	"Shut Up and Dance" by Walk the Moon	86	2nd
3	Lauren Osborn	"How Far I'll Go" by Auliʻi Cravalho	44	3rd
4	Sista Sista	"Rather Be" by Clean Bandit ft. Jess Glynne	3	Out
5	Abi Carter-Simpson	"It Must Be Love" by Madness	52	3rd (Lauren eliminated)
6	Sophie Clarke	"You'll Never Walk Alone" by Gerry and the Pacemakers	63	3rd (Abi eliminated)
7	Prince and Pearl	"Smells Like Teen Spirit" by Nirvana	57	Out
8	Jordan Yates	"Sweet Child o' Mine" by Guns N' Roses	49	Out
9	Sarah	"Heartbreaker" by Dionne Warwick	18	Out
10	Peter Eldridge	"Easy" by Lionel Richie	62	Out
11	Aimee Adrianne	"Dog Days Are Over" by Florence and the Machine	69	3rd (Sophie eliminated)
12	The Two Singing Taxi Drivers aka Wayne and Jimmy	"That's Life" by Frank Sinatra	12	Out
13	Valentina	"Stay with Me" by Sam Smith	85	3rd (Aimee eliminated)

Tabi advanced to the final.

Sing-Off details

Order	Name	Song	Score	Result
1	Valentina	"I Will Always Love You" by Whitney Houston	32	Eliminated
2	Karl Lewis	"Wonderwall" by Oasis	82	Advanced

=== Heat 3 (10 February) ===
- Ending Song:"I'm Still Standing" — Elton John

Running order

Order	Name	Song	Score	Result
1	Sara Santoni	"You Got the Love" by Candi Staton	64	1st
2	The Wild Tonics	"Sweet Dreams (Are Made of This)" by Eurythmics	75	1st (Sara moved to 2nd)
3	Sean Murphy	"I Believe in a Thing Called Love" by The Darkness	35	3rd
4	Natalie Lomax	"I'll Be There" by The Jackson 5	39	3rd (Sean eliminated)
5	Chloe Griffiths	"Don't Rain on My Parade" from Funny Girl	80	1st (The Wild Tonics moved to 2nd, Sara moved to 3rd. Natalie eliminated)
6	Theo Brehony	"Use Somebody" by Kings of Leon	31	Out
7	Harriette Mullen	"Don't Look Back in Anger" by Oasis	79	2nd (Wild Tonics moved to 3rd, Sara eliminated)
8	Triple Fret	"Livin' on a Prayer" by Bon Jovi	67	Out
9	Blake Anderson	"Chandelier" by Sia	75	3rd (Tie between Wild Tonics and Blake. Blake won 94–6. The Wild Tonics eliminated)
10	Steve Charles	"Uptown Funk" by Mark Ronson featuring Bruno Mars	35	Out
11	Carmen Rose	"Jolene" by Dolly Parton	2	Out
12	Norbert Bondin	"Say Something" by A Great Big World & Christina Aguilera	92	1st (Chloe moved to 2nd, Hariette moved to 3rd. Blake eliminated)
13	Jodie Steele	"I Wanna Dance with Somebody (Who Loves Me)" by Whitney Houston	97	1st (Norbert moved to 2nd, Chloe moved to 3rd. Hariette eliminated)

Jodie advanced to the final.

Sing-Off details

Name	Song	Score	Result
Chloe Griffiths	"Get Here" by Oleta Adams	31	Advanced
Norbert Bondin	"Next to Me" by Emeli Sandé	18	Eliminated

=== Heat 4 (17 February) ===
- End Song:"Flashdance... What a Feeling" from Flashdance

Running order

Order	Name	Song	Score	Result
1	Elinor Fortune	"Valerie" by Mark Ronson feat. Amy Winehouse	47	1st
2	Scott Dale	"Jealous" by Labrinth	92	1st (Elinor moved to 2nd)
3	Camilla Lewington	"Young Hearts Run Free" by Candi Staton	20	3rd
4	Ky Lewis	"Shape of You" by Ed Sheeran	65	2nd (Elinor moved to 3rd, Camilla eliminated)
5	Georgia	"Royals" by Lorde	62	3rd (Elinor eliminated)
6	The Gherkins	"Bring Me Sunshine" by The Jive Aces	52	Out
7	James Evans	"Happy" by Pharrell Williams	60	Out
8	Rachael Hawnt	"Skyfall" by Adele	66	2nd (Ky 3rd, Georgia eliminated)
9	Victoria Oruwari	"Climb Ev'ry Mountain" from The Sound of Music	95	1st (Scott moved to 2nd, Rachael moved to 3rd. Ky eliminated)
10	Michael Joslin	"Last Request" by Paolo Nutini	52	Out
11	Matthew Crane	"You Raise Me Up" by Westlife	57	Out
12	Ashleigh McHugh	"Who's Loving You" by Jackson 5	66	Out (tie between Rachael and Ashleigh. Rachael won 54–46.)

Victoria advanced to the final.

Sing-Off details

Name	Song	Score	Result
Rachael Hawnt	"Alone" by Heart	97	Advanced
Scott Dale	"Fly Me to the Moon" by Kaye Ballard	7	Eliminated

=== Heat 5 (24 February) ===
End Song: The Edge of Glory – Lady Gaga

Running order

Order	Name	Song	Score	Result
1	Fay Parkinson	"It's Raining Men" by The Weather Girls	80	1st
2	Lee England	"Goodnight Girl" by Wet Wet Wet	84	1st (Fay moved to 2nd)
3	Stacey Phipps	"Bridge over Troubled Water" by Simon & Garfunkel	42	3rd
4	Ross Sexton	"Galway Girl" by Ed Sheeran	42	3rd (Tie between Ross and Stacey. Ross won 58–42. Stacey eliminated.)
5	Rachael Russell	"We Are the Champions" by Queen	72	3rd (Ross eliminated)
6	Rachel Lee Stephens	"And I Am Telling You I'm Not Going" from Dreamgirls	90	1st (Lee moved to 2nd, Fay moved to 3rd, Rachael eliminated.)
7	Franki Sullivan	"I'm Outta Love" by Anastacia	12	Out
8	Len Blanco aka Helen White	"Signed, Sealed, Delivered I'm Yours" by Stevie Wonder	28	Out
9	Johnny Mack	"Rabbit" by Chas and Dave	23	Out
10	James Thompson	"Ordinary People" by John Legend	100	1st (Racheal moved to 2nd, Lee moved to 3rd, Fay eliminated.)
11	Stash	"(I've Had) The Time of My Life" from Bill Medley and Jennifer Warnes	55	Out

James advanced to the final.

Sing-Off details

Order	Name	Song	Score	Result
1	Lee England	"Mr. Brightside" by The Killers	68	Eliminated
2	Rachel Lee Stephens	"Run" by Snow Patrol	94	Advanced

=== The Final (3 March) ===
- Beginning Song: "Greatest Day" — Take That
- End Song: "Can't Stop the Feeling — Justin Timberlake

Running order

Order	Name	Song	Score	Result
1	Jodie Steele	"River Deep – Mountain High" by Ike & Tina Turner	83	1st
2	Karl Lewis	"Story of My Life" by One Direction	33	2nd
3	Rachel Lee Stephens	"I Don't Want to Miss a Thing" by Aerosmith	46	2nd (Karl moved to 3rd)
4	Chloe Griffiths	"I Dreamed a Dream" from Les Misérables	27	Out
5	James Thompson	"Crazy" by Gnarls Barkley	87	1st (Jodie moved to 2nd, Rachel moved to 3rd, Karl eliminated)
6	The Sundaes	"I'm Every Woman" by Chaka Khan	75	3rd (Rachel eliminated)
7	Victoria Oruwari	"All I Ask of You" from The Phantom of the Opera	84	2nd (Jodie moved to 3rd, Sundaes eliminated)
8	Tabi Gazele	"Finally" by CeCe Peniston	65	Out
9	Michael Rice	"Crazy in Love" by Beyoncé ft. Jay-Z	95	1st (James moved to 2nd, Victoria moved to 3rd, Jodie eliminated)
10	Rachael Hawnt	"Feeling Good" by Nina Simone	73	Out

Sing-Off details

Order	Name	Song	Score	Result
1	Victoria Oruwari	"Tonight" by Ferrante & Teicher	43	Third place
2	James Thompson	"Never Too Much" by Luther Vandross	84	Runner-up
3	Michael Rice	"Hallelujah" by Leonard Cohen	94	Winner

== The 100 ==
The 100 are a range of music experts and performers from across the UK. Members of the 100 include:

- Geri Horner, former member of the Spice Girls.
- Andy McGeoch, a jingle writer and lead singer with rock band Tasty.
- Kelly Wilde, an 80's singer and UK cabaret artist.
- Daisy Dance, formally known as Daizy Agnew, a singer-songwriter and member of UK girlband Girls Can't Catch.
- Lindsay Dracass, who represented the United Kingdom in the Eurovision Song Contest 2001.
- Gabz, a rapper who was a finalist on Britain's Got Talent in 2013.
- Divina de Campo (Owen Farrow), a drag queen who runs a cabaret bar in Manchester called Kiki, and who would later be a runner-up in RuPaul's Drag Race UK.
- Nikki Lamborn - Singer, Vocal Coach, Actress. Vocalist with Band Never The Bride, London Vocal Coach.
- Paulus, aka Paul Martin, a cabaret compere.
- James Lomas, the West End's original Billy Elliot in the musical.
- Lili Davies, a Romanian-born pub singer going by the name ‘Magic Betty’, who appeared on Britain's Got Talent in 2020.
- Lili La Scala, a cabaret singer.
- Chloe Akam, an opera and rock singer from Hampshire.
- Sophie Armstrong, a singer from Northumberland and part of the acoustic duo Summerland.
- Joanna Eden, a singer, pianist and vocal coach from Saffron Walden, who has worked with Sam Smith among others.
- Jordan Charles, a choir director and member of harmony group Vox Clever.
- Oriana Curls, a French jazz singer.
- Bee Bakare, a British-Nigerian singer and songwriter.
- Miggy Dela Rosa, a backing singer for George Michael among others.
- Harry Kersley, an operatic tenor.
- Charlie Healy, former lead singer of rock band The Risk and finalist of the 8th British series of The X Factor.
- Corene Campbell, a singer in the Soul trio Voices with Soul.
- Maria Grimsley and Tracey Richley, sisters that are a wedding-singer duo.
- Mark James, a vocal coach and performer.
- Chris Shannon, a singer from Kent who participated in Britain's Got Talent.
- Georg Tormann, a BRIT School vocal coach, who helped launch Ella Eyre's career, and founder of The London Concert Chorus.
- Jason Butler, an Open Mic UK finalist and karaoke bar owner from Wigan.
- Aaron Sokell, a singer/songwriter and vocal coach who has worked with the likes of Tom Jones and Beverley Knight.
- Simon Kindleysides, a singer-songwriter. The first wheelchair user judge on BBC One, and the first paralysed man to walk the London Marathon, in 2018.
- Lizzie Capener, an opera singer, and the first blind female TV judge.
- Grenville Jones, a choir director from Bath.
- Adam Dean, a Michael Bublé tribute act.
- Harmesh Gharu, Director of Commercial Music at Tring Park School for the Performing Arts.
- Sandy Grigelis, a singer/songwriter/musician and West End performer.
- Ash Stevenson, a singer from Bradford.
- Maryam Ghaffari, founder and director of the Got Soul Choir.
- Helen Garnett, member of harmony group The Garnett Family, who reached the semifinals of the 10th series of Britain's Got Talent.
- Mr Fabulous, aka Jay Kamiraz, a gospel choir director, Prince's Trust ambassador and Pride of Britain award winner.
- Tina T (her real name), a Motown & Soul singer, and a Tina Turner & Whitney Houston tribute act.
- Dylan Hutchinson, a musical theatre teacher and singer.
- Melissa Vaszi, a Canadian singer going by the name ‘Hunny B’.
- Donna Marie Trego, an award-winning Lady Gaga tribute act & impersonator.
- Ed and Emma Saklatvala, married opera singers and singing teachers from Croydon.
- Kiki deVille, a vintage cabaret artiste.
- Maxine Brooks, the founder and director of Birmingham Community Gospel Choir.
- Ged Thompson, a choir singer from Sheffield.
- Jessica Cambray, a wedding singer from Radcliffe.
- Sharon Ashton, a singer and vocal coach.
- Steve Brewer, a pop & rock singer and Ed Sheeran tribute from Essex.
- Milad Shadrooh, the 'Singing Dentist', who is famous for his song parodies.
- Nathaniel Morrison, a West End performer and founder of the West End Gospel Choir.
- Zane Heath, a singer and dancer from Skegness.
- Suzanna Dee, a Singer/songwriter / Vocal arranger / Producer / Backing vocalist / Session singer
- Larissa Eddie, a singer/songwriter, as well as supporting singer for Peter Andre and Lionel Richie.
- Nigel Murfitt, a singer at the London tourist attraction the Medieval Banquet.
- Georgia Bray, who would the following year make it to Knockouts of The Voice UK series 8.
- Rob King, a singer and barman, who two years later would compete on Britain's Got Talent.

== Ratings ==
Episode	Air date	Viewers (millions)	BBC One weekly ranking	Viewing share
Episode 1	27 January 2018	3.88	26	TBA
Episode 2	3 February 2018	3.90	29	TBA
Episode 3	10 February 2018	3.90	21	TBA
Episode 4	17 February 2018	3.83	23	TBA
Episode 5	24 February 2018	3.18	30	TBA
Episode 6 (final)	3 March 2018	4.03	30	TBA
Celebrity Special	24 December 2018	5.09	30	TBA
