= Hope (English group) =

English girl group

- Origin: London, England
- Genres: Pop
- Years active: 2007–2009
- Past members: Emily Biggs; Phoebe Brown; Raquelle Gracie; Leah Lauder; Charlie Mole; Sisi Jghalef

Hope were an English girl group consisting of Charlie Mole, Emily Biggs, Raquelle Gracie, Leah Lauder, and Phoebe Brown, who found fame on the fourth series of The X Factor been the eighth contestant eliminated, originally a six-piece before prior to the live shows, Sisi Jghalef was forced to step down after it was discovered that she had an outstanding criminal conviction.

== The X Factor ==
The members of Hope auditioned originally as soloists but did not make it past bootcamp. However, judge Louis Walsh suggested that they re-audition, with the group originally containing member Sisi Jghalef. After reaching the judges' homes stage and being told that they had made it through to the top twelve, it emerged that Jghalef had an outstanding criminal conviction. This went against the rules of the competition and the show's producers asked her to leave the group. On 3, 17 and 24 November, they were in the bottom two but were saved by the judges on the first two occasions, and by the public vote on the other (due to the result going to deadlock). Hope were eliminated in the quarter-final by public vote.

== After The X Factor ==
Since leaving the show, Hope have performed at various events around the UK including The Birmingham Clothes Show and have booked their first international date in Dubai. They announced three tracks from their debut album: "Hot", "This Is It" and "I Apologize", which features Pharrell Williams.

It was revealed on MTV UK Television's The Celebrity Agency that Hope went through a temporary split. As of 28 April 2009, the band's official website was taken down and it is presumed that Hope is on hiatus.

== Solo careers ==
Brown subsequently joined the group Girls Can't Catch, signed to Fascination Records, the same label as Girls Aloud. However, the group disbanded after its two singles, "Keep Your Head Up" and "Echo" failed to meet expectations.

Biggs joined the group Parade. Their debut single "Louder" reached the top 10 in the UK singles chart while their follow-up, "Perfume", peaked at number 38. Parade's self-titled debut album was released in October 2011 but failed to enter the top 100. The group were dropped from their label in 2012 and split in early 2013.

Gracie now hosts the news/gossip web series "Daily Dips" on Dipdive.

Mole now works as a Senior Recruitment Consultant.
