= Agombar =

Agombar is a surname of French Huguenot origin. Notable people with the surname include:

- Jessica Agombar, British songwriter, previously member of the band Parade
