= Shelly-Ann =

Shelly-Ann is a feminine compound given name. It may refer to:

- Shelly-Ann Cox (1988–2026), Barbadian scientist and civil servant
- Shelly-Ann Fraser-Pryce (born 1986), retired Jamaican track and field sprinter

== See also ==
- Shellyann Evans, Welsh singer
- Shelley-Ann Brown, Canadian bobsledder
- Shelly Anne Simonds, American politician
