= Jimmy Carr's Am I The A**hole? =

British TV panel show

- Promotional poster featuring Jimmy Carr
- Genre: Comedy; panel show
- Based on: r/AmItheAsshole
- Presented by: Jimmy Carr; GK Barry; Jamali Maddix
- Country of origin: United Kingdom
- Original language: English
- No. of series: 2
- No. of episodes: 16

Production
- Executive producers: Iestyn Barker; Marc Beaulac; Steph Harris
- Production location: Television Centre, London
- Running time: 60 minutes
- Production company: Tuesday's Child

Original release
- Network: Comedy Central
- Release: 27 October 2025 – present

Jimmy Carr's Am I The A**hole?, sometimes stylised as Am I The A******?, is a British comedy panel game show produced by Tuesday's Child. It is based on the subreddit r/AmItheAsshole. Comedian Jimmy Carr serves as the host, alongside team captains GK Barry and Jamali Maddix, who judge stories put forward by contestants to determine if they were in the right or wrong. It is broadcast on Comedy Central.

== Background ==
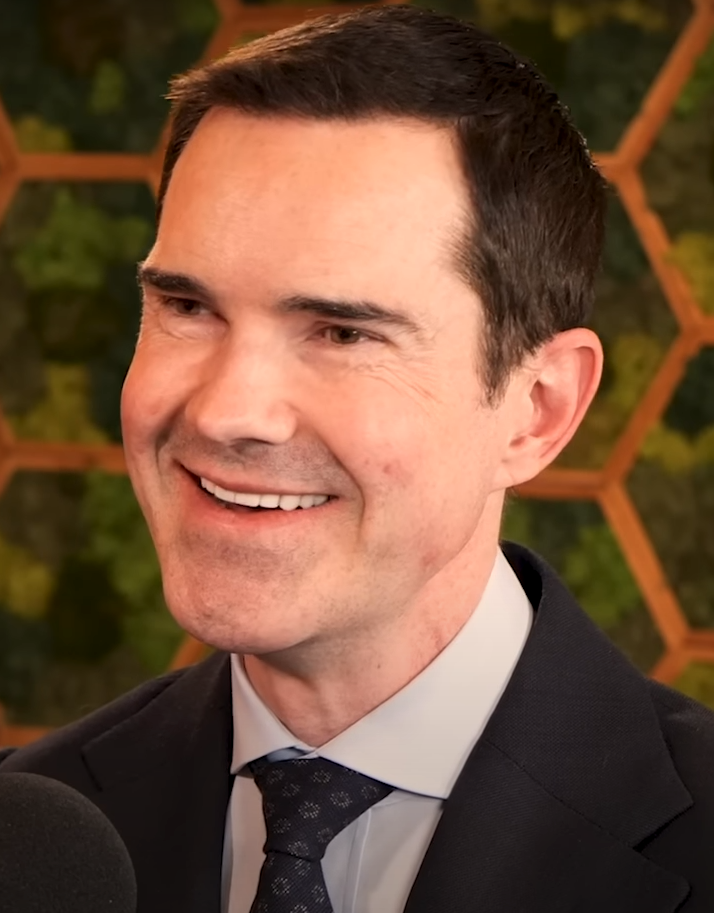
Jimmy Carr

On 16 April 2025, Paramount International Networks issued a press release announcing Jimmy Carr would host a newly commissioned eight-part comedy entertainment series titled Jimmy Carr's Am I The A**hole?, with the format inspired by one of Reddit's most popular subreddits, r/AmItheAsshole (AITA), with the subreddit's creator Marc Beaulac being named as an executive producer of the show, alongside Steph Harris of production company Tuesday's Child, and Iestyn Barker of Comedy Central UK. In May, following a pilot episode that had been recorded with Rob Beckett as the host earlier in the year, Comedy Central confirmed Carr would host all eight televised episodes with team captains GK Barry and Jamali Maddix, who would be joined by a panel of two other comedians. Episodes were filmed from 16 June until 19 June at the BBC Television Centre in White City, London. The first series aired every Monday from 27 October to 15 December 2025 in the 9pm timeslot.

In March 2026, the show's production company, Tuesday's Child, officially confirmed that the show had been recommissioned for a second series, with eight one-hour long episodes that would see Carr, Barry and Maddix return as the host and team captains. Like the first series, the second was filmed at the BBC Television Centre, this time from 20 July until 23 July 2026. On 5 October 2026, the airdate of the second series' premiere episode was revealed to be Monday, 2 November, where it retained its 9pm timeslot.

== Format ==
Members of the public who appear as contestants present the panel of Carr and Team Captains GK Barry and Jamali Maddix with their own stories for them to judge, and determine if they were acting as "A**holes" or not in their situation.

== Episodes ==
=== Series 1 (2025) ===
No.	#	Original air date	Viewers (millions) (Note: Sourced by BARB.)
1	1	27 October 2025	N/A
2	2	3 November 2025	N/A
3	3	10 November 2025	N/A
4	4	17 November 2025	N/A
5	5	24 November 2025	N/A
6	6	1 December 2025	N/A
7	7	8 December 2025	N/A
8	8	15 December 2025	N/A

=== Series 2 (2026) ===
No.	#	Original air date	Viewers (millions) (Note: Sourced by BARB.)
1	1	2 November 2026	TBD
2	2	9 November 2026	TBD
3	3	16 November 2026	TBD
4	4	23 November 2026	TBD
5	5	30 November 2026	TBD
6	6	TBD	TBD
7	7	TBD	TBD
8	8	TBD	TBD
