= Sian Charlesworth =

British singer

- Born: 17 January 1987 (age 39); Bolton, England
- Genres: Pop
- Occupation: Singer
- Instrument: Vocals
- Years active: 2007–present
- Label: Atlantic Records
- Formerly of: Parade

Sian Charlesworth (born 17 January 1987) is an English singer and former member of girl group Parade.

== Career ==
=== City Girls ===
In 2007, Charlesworth took part in the auditions with the producers Kim Glover and Samantha Forrest to become a member of a new girl group. Charlesworth was chosen to become a member of the "City Girls" (initially called "Stiletto"). The group was formed by Charlesworth and other three girls: Sheena Rowe, Sophie Leniston and Rebecca Doran. City Girls released their first single "O.M.G." in August 2008. The single was written by Darren Monson, Jay Raser and Sheena Rowe, and was produced by Pete Hammond and Jay Raser. The single reached number 3 in the UK Music Week Pop/Club Charts and reached No. 40 in the Bulgarian chart. The group started a promotional tour including a number of performances, appearances on television, radio and newspapers. The song was used as the soundtrack of the video game, Imagine Girl Band. In the beginning of 2009, Charlesworth and Doran left the group and were replaced by Claudia Evans.

=== BVG ===
In 2009, Charlesworth was also a member of a vocal group called "BVG". They did a number of gigs but they did not release recording material.

=== Parade ===
In 2010, she became a member of the new British girl group Parade, featuring Jessica Agombar, Emily Biggs, Bianca Claxton and Lauren Deegan. Their debut single "Louder" was released on 13 March 2011, which consequently entered in the UK Singles Chart at number 10, and in the Irish Singles Chart at number 41. Parade supported Shakira on the English dates for her 2010 The Sun Comes Out World tour. They also supported Alexandra Burke on her All Night Long 2011 tour, and Shayne Ward on his 2011 Up Close and Personal tour. Their second single "Perfume" was released on 19 June 2011 and charted at number 38 in the UK. Their self-titled debut album was released in November 2011 but failed to chart within the top 100, peaking at a low No. 171. Due to the poor sales of the album, Parade were dropped from Asylum Records.

The group spent 2012 working on their second studio album. They collaborated with successful UK producer Tim Powell, who has written and produced for the likes of Girls Aloud and Sugababes, on tracks including "Light Me Up". According to Twitter posts, they also worked with Ed Drewett, Fred Ball, MNEK, K-Gee, Jamal Hadaway and Tre Jean-Marie.

On 11 July 2012, through their official blog, they announced "Light Me Up" as the first song to be posted online from their new album. It was released as a free download on 1 August 2012.

On 11 February 2013, it was announced through the group's Twitter account that Claxton had decided to leave Parade, and that as a result, the other members had decided not to continue as a group. They also revealed that they were unsigned throughout 2012 to 2013, after being dropped by their record label in 2011. They released an official statement on the subject of their split:

"Dear Fans, we have some news that we're gutted to announce – sadly Bianca has chosen to leave the band. As you all know, the 5 of us make Parade and without all of us together the band would not be the same! We hope you understand that we've made the difficult decision to not carry on without her, as Parade is about the 5 of us girls. We cannot thank our fans enough for your incredible support as without you lot we wouldn't have achieved the success that we've had. In the last year as an unsigned band, we've written and recorded some wicked tracks and as a thank you we'd like to give something back for your love and patience. Watch our facebook page for more information. Thank you for coming on this rollercoaster of a ride with us and look out for us in the future! Love Parade x"

In February 2013, a SoundCloud account under the username "user123330693" leaked a previously unreleased track called "Lose It" which was originally intended to be included on their debut album. The song was reportedly produced by RedOne and heavily samples Reel 2 Real's "I Like To Move It". At a later date the account debuted 4 more new tracks recorded for their unreleased second album called "Chaos", "(Come) On The Double" and "Puppet Master (Dance For Me)". In early March "Throw It Up in the Air", which was part of their setlist for their UK tour when supporting The Wanted, was also released via the SoundCloud user.
