= All Together Now (British TV series) series 2 =

All Together Now
- Series 2
- Presented by: Rob Beckett
- Judges: The 100
- Winner: Shellyann Evans
- Runner-up: Southern Flavor

Release
- Original network: BBC One
- Original release: 2 March – 13 April 2019

Series chronology
- ← Previous; Series 1

The second series of British reality television music competition All Together Now started airing on BBC One on 2 March 2019. It is presented by Rob Beckett and Geri Halliwell (credited as Geri Horner). Shellyann Evans was crowned the winner of the second series on 13 April 2019.

== Performances ==
=== Heat 1 (2 March) ===
| Order | Name | Song | Score | Result |
|---|---|---|---|---|
| 1 | Southern Flavor | "Valerie" by The Zutons | 95 | 1st |
| 2 | Lucy | "Whole Lotta Love" by Led Zeppelin | 81 | 2nd |
| 3 | Pete Felton | "You Give Me Something" by James Morrison | 36 | 3rd |
| 4 | Adam & Nicole | "Ain't Nobody" by Chaka Khan | 6 | Eliminated |
| 5 | Lorena Dale | "Waiting All Night" by Rudimental feat. Ella Eyre | 53 | 3rd (Pete Eliminated) |
| 6 | Veronica Green | "Get the Party Started" by P!nk | 77 | 3rd (Lorena Eliminated) |
| 7 | Laura Baird | "When We Were Young" by Adele | 85 | 2nd (Lucy moved to 3rd, Veronica eliminated) |
| 8 | Tara | "Havana" by Camila Cabello | 17 | Eliminated |
| 9 | Sammy Leighton Clay | "There's Nothing Holdin' Me Back" by Shawn Mendes | 34 | Eliminated |
| 10 | Kike Adenowo | "Isn't She Lovely" by Stevie Wonder | 83 | 3rd (Lucy eliminated) |
| 11 | Lywis Cowles | "When I Was Your Man" by Bruno Mars | 84 | 3rd (Kike eliminated) |

Southern Flavor advanced to the final.

| Order | Name | Song | Score | Result |
|---|---|---|---|---|
| 1 | Lywis Cowles | "Skin" by Rag'n'Bone Man | 84 | Advanced |
| 2 | Laura Baird | "How Am I Supposed to Live Without You" by Michael Bolton | 34 | Eliminated |

=== Heat 2 (9 March) ===
| Order | Name | Song | Score | Result |
|---|---|---|---|---|
| 1 | James | "A Kind of Magic" by Queen | 41 | 1st |
| 2 | Alex Nicole | "Touch" by Little Mix | 17 | 2nd |
| 3 | Gary Hughes | "Eye of the Tiger" by Survivor | 42 | 1st (James moved to 2nd, Alex Nicole moved to 3rd) |
| 4 | Aimee Neill | "Part of Your World" from The Little Mermaid | 51 | 1st (Gary moved to 2nd, James moved to 3rd, Alex Nicole eliminated) |
| 5 | Gary | "Pillowtalk" by Zayn Malik | 69 | 1st (Aimee moved to 2nd, Gary moved to 3rd, James eliminated) |
| 6 | Xavier | "Locked Out of Heaven" by Bruno Mars | 97 | 1st (Gary moved to 2nd, Aimee moved to 3rd, Gary eliminated) |
| 7 | Bernadette Bangura | "Somebody Else's Guy" by Jocelyn Brown | 84 | 2nd (Gary moved to 3rd, Aimee eliminated) |
| 8 | Whitney | "All by Myself" by Eric Carmen | 15 | Eliminated |
| 9 | Chris | "Fix You" by Coldplay | 66 | Eliminated |
| 10 | Mandi Fisher | "I (Who Have Nothing)" by Shirley Bassey | 92 | 2nd (Bernadette moved to 3rd, Gary eliminated) |

Xavier advanced to the final.

| Order | Name | Song | Score | Result |
|---|---|---|---|---|
| 1 | Bernadette Bangura | "It's a Man's Man's Man's World" by James Brown | 99 | Advanced |
| 2 | Mandi Fisher | "Maybe This Time" by Liza Minnelli | 74 | Eliminated |

=== Heat 3 (23 March) ===
| Order | Name | Song | Score | Result |
|---|---|---|---|---|
| 1 | Dale Ali | "Fighter" by Christina Aguilera | 49 | 1st |
| 2 | Selina | "Runnin' (Lose It All)" by Naughty Boy feat. Beyoncé and Arrow Benjamin | 44 | 2nd |
| 3 | Hilary John | "I Could Have Danced All Night" from My Fair Lady | 64 | 1st (Dale moved to 2nd, Selina moved to 3rd) |
| 4 | Jerusha | "Dangerous Woman" by Ariana Grande | 11 | Eliminated |
| 5 | Maia | "Fastlove" by George Michael | 32 | Eliminated |
| 6 | Ben Lancaster | "Master Blaster" by Stevie Wonder | 86 | 1st (Hilary moved to 2nd, Dale moved to 3rd, Selina eliminated) |
| 7 | Nicola Greenwood | "Upside Down" by Paloma Faith | 84 | 2nd (Hilary moved to 3rd, Dale eliminated) |
| 8 | Nic Chiapetta | "Maniac" by Flashdance | 16 | Eliminated |
| 9 | Carys Lloyd | "Pure Imagination" from Willy Wonka & the Chocolate Factory | 76 | 3rd (Hilary eliminated) |

Ben advanced to the final.

| Order | Name | Song | Score | Result |
|---|---|---|---|---|
| 1 | Carys Lloyd | "What a Wonderful World" by Louis Armstrong | 72 | Eliminated |
| 2 | Nicola Greenwood | "Wake Me Up" by Avicii | 94 | Advanced |

=== Heat 4 (30 March) ===
| Order | Name | Song | Score | Result |
|---|---|---|---|---|
| 1 | Emily Louise | "I Think We're Alone Now" by Tiffany | 52 | 1st |
| 2 | Dammit Jack | "Hey Ya!" by Outkast | 16 | 2nd |
| 3 | Kelly Agbowu | "The Show Must Go On" by Queen | 60 | 1st (Emily moved to 2nd, Dammit Jack moved to 3rd) |
| 4 | Nicole McNally | "Creep" by Radiohead | 43 | 3rd (Dammit Jack eliminated) |
| 5 | Ben Irish | "Goodbye" by Spice Girls | 29 | Eliminated |
| 6 | Danny Wade | "Bring Him Home" from Les Misérables | 89 | 1st (Kelly moved to 2nd, Emily moved to 3rd, Nicole eliminated) |
| 7 | Chris Folwell | "Skyscraper" by Demi Lovato | 55 | 3rd (Emily eliminated) |
| 8 | Shellyann Evans | "Rise Up" by Andra Day | 98 | 1st (Danny moved to 2nd, Kelly moved to 3rd, Chris eliminated) |
| 9 | Aron Fisahaye | "As" by George Michael and Mary J. Blige | 72 | 3rd (Kelly eliminated) |

Shellyann advanced to the final.

| Order | Name | Song | Score | Result |
|---|---|---|---|---|
| 1 | Aron Fisahaye | "I Have Nothing" by Whitney Houston | 63 | Advanced |
| 2 | Danny Wade | "The Climb" by Miley Cyrus | 53 | Eliminated |

=== Heat 5 (6 April) ===
| Order | Name | Song | Score | Result |
|---|---|---|---|---|
| 1 | Britt Lenting | "Don't Leave Me This Way" by The Communards | 67 | 1st |
| 2 | Jake | "Last Request" by Paolo Nutini | 27 | 2nd |
| 3 | Chelsea Smith | "Listen" by Beyoncé | 65 | 2nd (Jake moved to 3rd) |
| 4 | The Hurst Sisters | "Time After Time by Cyndi Lauper | 34 | 3rd (Jake eliminated) |
| 5 | Micaela McGillian | "Hotline Bling" by Drake | 66 | 2nd (Chelsea moved to 3rd, The Hurst Sisters eliminated) |
| 6 | Harrison Knights | "I Am What I Am" from La Cage aux Folles | 29 | Eliminated |
| 7 | Liv and Oli | "Say You Won't Let Go" by James Arthur | 63 | Eliminated |
| 8 | Anastasia Quinton-Smith | "The Power of Love" by Frankie Goes to Hollywood | 96 | 1st (Britt moved to 2nd, Micaela moved to 3rd, Chelsea eliminated) |

Anastasia advanced to the final.

| Order | Name | Song | Score | Result |
|---|---|---|---|---|
| 1 | Micaela McGillian | "Candyman" by Christina Aguilera" | 18 | Eliminated |
| 2 | Britt Lenting | "Never Enough" from The Greatest Showman | 93 | Advanced |

=== The Final (13 April) ===
| Order | Name | Song | Score | Result |
|---|---|---|---|---|
| 1 | Xavier | "Happy" by Pharrell Williams | 73 | 1st |
| 2 | Britt Lenting | "I'd Do Anything for Love (But I Won't Do That)" by Meat Loaf | 21 | 2nd |
| 3 | Lywis Cowles | "Forget You" by CeeLo Green | 70 | 2nd (Britt moved to 3rd) |
| 4 | Bernadette Bangura | "Purple Rain" by Prince | 96 | 1st (Xavier moved to 2nd, Lywis moved to 3rd, Britt eliminated) |
| 5 | Aron Fisahaye | "Against All Odds (Take a Look at Me Now)" by Phil Collins | 32 | Eliminated |
| 6 | Anastasia Quinton-Smith | "With or Without You" by U2 | 41 | Eliminated |
| 7 | Southern Flavor | "Blame It on the Boogie" by The Jackson 5 | 78 | 2nd (Xavier moved to 3rd, Lywis eliminated) |
| 8 | Nicola Greenwood | "Came Here for Love" by Sigala and Ella Eyre | 69 | Eliminated |
| 9 | Ben Lancaster | "True" by Spandau Ballet | 65 | Eliminated |
| 10 | Shellyann Evans | "What About Us" by P!nk | 99 | 1st (Bernadette moved to 2nd, Southern Flavor moved to 3rd, Xavier eliminated) |

Sing-Off details

| Order | Name | Song | Score | Result |
|---|---|---|---|---|
| 1 | Southern Flavor | "Hold Back the River" by James Bay | 68 | Runner-up |
| 2 | Bernadette Bangura | "Halo" by Beyoncé | 23 | Third place |
| 3 | Shellyann Evans | "Alive" by Sia | 100 | Winner |

== The 100 ==
The 100 are a range of music experts and performers from across the UK. Some judges from the previous series returned, and some new judges were added to the panel, including:

- Frankie Cena, Mister World Talent 2012 and an R&B singer.
- Talia Mar, a video content creator and singer.
- Ami Carmine, a singer, songwriter and DJ.
- Ben Papworth, a musical director working in the West End of London.
- Celestina Diamond, a backing singer who's performed with singers like Mariah Carey and Madonna.
- Carreira 3, an R&B group formed by three brothers who have toured with Ne-Yo and Tinie Tempah.
- Rebecca Louise Porter, an Adele tribute act.
- Gatham Cheema, a singer from Worcester who competed in The X Factor of 2012 and 2013.
- Rachelle Rhienne, a singer and songwriter from Balloch.
- Lily-Rose Sheppard, a professional "mermaid singer".
- Julie Miles, a vocal coach who has worked with Sam Lavery and Courtney Hadwin among others.
- Yvette Royle, a function singer and Celine Dion tribute act.
- Reena Kaur, a punjabi folk singer.
- Dayton Grey, a Motown & Soul singer from Dudley.
- Michael Auger, a member of the musical theatre band Collabro.
- Bud and Aidan, twin brothers and singers of the punk band We Are One from Doncaster.
- Jack Griffin, an entertainment manager.

== Ratings ==
| Episode | Air date | Viewers (millions) | BBC One weekly ranking | Viewing share |
|---|---|---|---|---|
| Episode 1 | 2 March 2019 | | | |
| Episode 2 | 9 March 2019 | | | |
| Episode 3 | 23 March 2019 | | | |
| Episode 4 | 30 March 2019 | 3.37 | TBA | 19.9% |
| Episode 5 | 6 April 2019 | | | |
| Episode 6 (final) | 13 April 2019 | | | |
