= Keep Your Head Up =

Keep Your Head Up may refer to:

- "Keep Your Head Up" (Andy Grammer song), 2010
- "Keep Your Head Up" (Ben Howard song), 2011
- "Keep Your Head Up" (Artist Credited as Michael Jackson song), 2010
- "Keep Your Head Up" (Girls Can't Catch song), 2009
- "Keep Your Head Up", a song by Cults from their 2013 album Static
- "Keep Ya Head Up", a 1993 song by Tupac Shakur
- "Keep Your Head Up", a 2017 song by Lucas & Steve and Firebeatz featuring Little Giants
