= Soak Up the Sun =

2002 song by Sheryl Crow

Single by Sheryl Crow

from the album C'mon, C'mon
- B-side: "Chances Are"; "You're Not the One"
- Released: February 11, 2002
- Studio: Various
- Genre: Bubblegum pop
- Length: 4:52 (album version); 3:25 (radio edit)
- Label: A&M
- Songwriters: Sheryl Crow; Jeff Trott
- Producers: Sheryl Crow; Jeff Trott

Sheryl Crow singles chronology
"Sweet Child o' Mine" (1999)	"Soak Up the Sun" (2002)	"Steve McQueen" (2002)

Music video
- "Soak Up the Sun" on YouTube

"Soak Up the Sun" is a song by American singer Sheryl Crow. She and her longtime co-writer Jeff Trott wrote the song following a conversation they had during a plane flight, when they discussed the changing weather as they flew to New York City from Portland, Oregon. Crow was recovering from surgery at the time, inspiring her and Trott to write a happy song that would cheer her up. In the song, Crow has no money to afford any luxuries or necessities, but she decides that wallowing in her sadness is not a productive activity, so she reflects on what she currently has and "puts on a happy face" that she plans to spread to others. Crow chose to release the song as the lead single from her fourth studio album, C'mon, C'mon (2002), as she wanted to enliven people living in a post-9/11 society.

Crow first performed the song at the 2002 AFC Championship Game in January 2002, and A&M Records released "Soak Up the Sun" as a single in the United States on February 11, 2002. The song became Crow's sixth top-40 hit in the US, reaching number 17 on the Billboard Hot 100 and topping two other Billboard rankings. The Victor Calderone and Mac Quayle remixes also topped the Billboard Dance Club Songs chart, making it Crow's only record to peak atop the listing. "Soak Up the Sun" was America's 35th-best-performing single of 2002, and the Recording Industry Association of America (RIAA) awarded the song a gold disc in 2005. Worldwide, the song reached the top 10 in Croatia and the top 20 in Austria, New Zealand, Switzerland, and the United Kingdom.

A music video directed by Wayne Isham was made for the song, featuring Crow performing the track with many beachgoers on Oahu, Hawaii. The video shows her performing the song at several locations on the beach and surfing. These scenes are interspersed with other surfers riding the waves as well. Various cosmetics and lotions were used to achieve Crow's tanned look in the music video, with makeup artist Scott Barnes wanting a "St. Tropez" look. On her birthday, which occurred during filming, Crow received a surfboard from the crew that she uses in the video.

== Background, release, and promotion ==
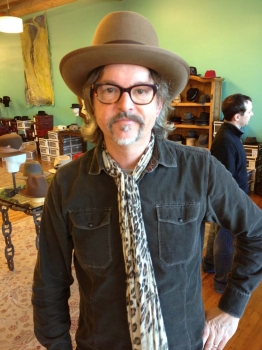
Jeff Trott (pictured) co-wrote the song with Crow after a plane trip.

"Soak Up the Sun" originated from a conversation that Sheryl Crow had with co-worker Jeff Trott during a plane trip. The two were flying from Portland, Oregon, to New York City, and Trott commented how "ironic" it was that they were departing a rainy city for a sunny city. This thought stuck with Trott after the trip, and he and Crow wrote a song based on what he felt during the trip. Around the same time, Crow was recovering from non-invasive surgery, leaving her debilitated. She and Trott decided to write the song to take her mind off her discomfort, and the lyrics came to them rapidly. Crow claims that the reason they came to her so quickly was because of the medication she was on, which also influenced her to write another track for C'mon, C'mon, "Weather Channel". In a 2002 interview with Radio & Records, Crow recalled that she wrote the song and most of the album before the September 11 attacks, and she wanted to release the song as the lead single from C'mon, C'mon since northern summer was only a few months away and because she wanted everyone to feel better after the stressful winter. Along with Trina Shoemaker and Eric Tew, Crow recorded the song and album at various studios in the United States and United Kingdom.

Crow first performed "Soak Up the Sun" on January 27, 2002, at the 2002 AFC Championship Game, and it was released to adult album alternative, hot adult contemporary, and top 40 radio stations on February 11, 2002. Two days later, Radio & Records' Music Meeting website made the song available for download, becoming the first retailer to do so. In Europe and Australia, A&M Records issued the song as a CD single on March 25, 2002, backed with two non-album B-sides: "Chances Are" and "You're Not the One". The same month, Crow traveled around Europe to promote the song and its parent album. Two days after its European release, a CD single was issued in Japan, and on April 1, 2002, A&M released "Soak Up the Sun" in the United Kingdom as two CD singles and a cassette single. During a live performance at the Glastonbury Festival in June 2019, Crow dedicated the song to Swedish environmental activist Greta Thunberg.

== Composition and lyrics ==
"Soak Up the Sun"
The chorus of "Soak Up the Sun". Liz Phair sings the background vocals.

"Soak Up the Sun" is a bubblegum pop song written in common time with a key of E major, following a moderately fast tempo of 120 beats per minute. American singer Liz Phair appears as a guest vocalist, with Tim Smith providing additional background vocals. Crow played acoustic guitar and an F/X keyboard while Trott played electric guitar, acoustic guitar, lap steel guitar, and bass. Jeff Anthony played drums, and he, along with Trott, handled drum programming.

Keith Philips of The A.V. Club described "Soak Up the Sun" as a "tribute to good living", and Billboard magazine editor Chuck Taylor noted that the song resembles Crow's earlier works, particularly "All I Wanna Do" (1994), with simplistic instrumentation and lyrics about living with what one already has. Crow has also acknowledged the similarity, explaining that the difference between the two songs is that "All I Wanna Do" is more "sardonic" in its meaning.

The song's overall lyrical meaning is diverse depending on which lines are examined. Crow stated that she believes "Soak Up the Sun" is about trying to live life with a constant smile despite the hardships that people encounter on a daily basis. Abigail Martin of college newspaper The Maine Campus wrote that the song illustrates this theme while also cautioning that nothing lasts forever, as indicated by the post-chorus line "before [the Sun] goes out on me". Music critics have noted that the song is reproachful of consumerism—as hinted by the lyric "while it's still free" as well as the communist mentioned at the beginning of the song—and how it relates to the declining popularities of certain celebrities, including Crow herself. Conversely, other critics believe that the line is literal, stating that the sun does not cost anything and therefore should always be available as a source for optimism. Entertainment Weekly's David Browne wrote that the song is a critique on "information-saturated culture".

== Critical reception ==
Reviewing the song for Billboard, Chuck Taylor called "Soak Up the Sun" "reassuring" when compared with the changing chart trends of early 2002, commenting that the track is "top-notch, honest-to-goodness musicianship". Steve Wonsiewicz of Radio & Records described the song as "breezy" and "feel-good". UK radio station The Revolution head of music Chris Gregg said the song is more "mature" than Crow's previous material and could catch the attention of adult audiences. On April 27, 2002, Music & Media magazine named it their "Pick of the Week", with music editor Thorsten Weber noting that it does not take long for listeners to sing along, labeling the song as "melodic" and "catchy". Sal Cinquemani of Slant Magazine noted that Crow's lyrics were a return to form and compared the song to the works of the Beach Boys. Retrospectively, Raymond Cummings of popular culture website Splice Today gave the song a negative review, referring to is as one of the most "loathsome" songs of the 2000s decade and criticizing its lyrics, comparing them to a superficial message one would find on a Hallmark card.

== Chart performance ==
In the United States, "Soak Up the Sun" debuted on the Billboard Hot 100 at number 73 on April 13, 2002, becoming that week's "Hot Shot Debut". Fourteen issues later, on July 20, 2002, the song rose to its peak of number 17. It was Crow's sixth single to enter the top 40 and spent a total of 29 weeks on the Hot 100, last appearing at number 42 on October 26, 2002. In December 2002, Billboard ranked the song at number 35 on its year-end Hot 100 edition. The song became a number-one hit on two other Billboard charts: the Adult Alternative Songs chart and the Adult Top 40. On the former chart, it spent seven weeks at number one, while on the latter, it remained at the top spot for nine weeks. It additionally reached number five on the magazine's Adult Contemporary chart and number 15 on the Mainstream Top 40 listing. On the Billboard Dance Club Songs chart, the Victor Calderone and Mac Quayle remixes topped the ranking on the week of June 1, 2002, becoming Crow's only song to top this chart. The RIAA awarded the song a gold certification in June 2005 for digital sales exceeding 500,000 in the US alone. In Canada, the song charted for one week on the Canadian Singles Chart, at number 24 on April 27, 2002. It was the second-most played song on Canadian radio in 2002.

In the United Kingdom, "Soak Up the Sun" became Crow's 15th and penultimate top-40 hit, debuting at peaking at number 16 on the UK Singles Chart in April 2002. It spent 10 weeks within the top 100, her longest-charting single since "All I Wanna Do" logged 17 weeks in the top 100 in 1995. In neighboring Ireland, the song peaked at number 36 and spent five weeks on the Irish Singles Chart; it was her only single besides "All I Wanna Do" that spent at least five weeks on the listing. On continental Europe, the song reached the top 10 in Croatia, peaking at number seven. It was also a top-40 hit in Romania, where it rose to number 39 in June 2002 and stayed on the Romanian Top 100 for 17 weeks. In German-speaking Europe, although the track stalled at number 96 in Germany, it reached number 15 in both Austria and Switzerland. In Switzerland, it logged 30 weeks on the Swiss Hitparade, becoming the country's 94th-most-successful single of 2002. Elsewhere in Europe, "Soak Up the Sun" reached number 51 on the French Singles Chart, number 76 on the Dutch Single Top 100, and number 17 on Wallonia's Ultratip Bubbling Under chart, attaining a peak of number 70 on the Eurochart Hot 100. In Oceania, the single rose into the top 20 in New Zealand, attaining a peak of number 19 on June 9, 2002, and remaining in the top 50 for 16 weeks, but in Australia, it failed to enter the top 75, reaching number 88 on April 1, 2002. The single was certified gold by both the Australian Recording Industry Association (ARIA) and Recorded Music NZ (RMNZ) for sales and streams in excess of 35,000 and 15,000 units, respectively.

== Music video ==
Crow surfing in the song's music video. Numerous beauty supplies were used to obtain the singer's tanned, rockstar-surfer hybrid look.

Wayne Isham directed the video to "Soak Up the Sun", which was filmed on Oahu, Hawaii. The first day was rainy, but by the next day, the weather had cleared up. That same day, for Crow's 40th birthday, the music video's crew gave Crow a custom-made surfboard. Speaking of the experience, Crow said, "I couldn't have asked for a sweeter birthday [...] And I couldn't wait to go surfing." During the filming, she rode waves alongside professional surfers such as Malia Jones and Pākē Salmon. To prepare Crow's hair for the video, hairstylist Peter Butler lathered it with Fudge Oomf Booster, then blow-dried it straight. Afterwards, he curled her hair with Velcro rollers, sprayed it with Phytolaque Soie hair spray, and used a curling iron to texture several areas. For Crow's skin, makeup artist Scott Barnes decided to replicate a St. Tropez tan, which he accomplished by applying Body Bling cream. He also used his then-upcoming brand of mascara on Crow's eyelashes. The clothes Crow wore during filming were courtesy of Linda Medvene, who explained, "The concept was to make her look like a rock star and yet fit in with the surfers."

The video features numerous clips of surfers riding waves and includes several freeze frames with yellow coloration. During the introduction, Crow retrieves her surfboard from her car and puts on lotion. As she performs the song with her guitar, she is mostly seen on the beach. During the first verse, she is seen in a recreational vehicle (RV). As the first chorus begins, she leaves the RV and prances with her guitar close to the ocean. The second verse features Crow singing by a waterfall, where various people, including herself, jump into the water below. Shortly before the second chorus begins, Crow is seen riding in a car. The sun sets during the final section, where many beachgoers dances around Crow and sing the song with her. The video ends by fading to yellow during a scene where Crow is next to a beach fire.

== Track listings ==
Mexican, European, Australian, and Japanese CD single

1. "Soak Up the Sun" (radio edit) – 3:25
2. "Chances Are" – 5:14
3. "You're Not the One" – 4:06
4. "Soak Up the Sun" (album version) – 4:54

Mexican, European, and South African maxi-CD single

1. "Soak Up the Sun" (album version) – 4:54
2. "Soak Up the Sun" (Sunsweep radio mix) – 4:24
3. "Soak Up the Sun" (Sunsweep club mix) – 10:08
4. "Soak Up the Sun" (Sunsweep dub) – 6:12

UK cassette single

1. "Soak Up the Sun" (radio edit) – 3:25
2. "Everyday Is a Winding Road" – 4:16
3. "If It Makes You Happy" – 5:23

UK CD1

1. "Soak Up the Sun" (radio edit) – 3:25
2. "Chances Are" – 5:14
3. "You're Not the One" – 4:06
4. "Soak Up the Sun" (video)

UK CD2

1. "Soak Up the Sun" (album version) – 4:52
2. "My Favorite Mistake" (live version from Central Park) – 4:14
3. "A Change Would Do You Good" (live version) – 5:18
4. CD-ROM, including preview of new album

== Credits and personnel ==
Credits are lifted from the C'mon, C'mon album booklet and the international CD single liner notes.

Studios

- Recorded at various studios in the US and UK
- Mixed at Soundtrack Studios (New York City)
- Mastered at Masterdisk (New York City)

Personnel

- Sheryl Crow – writing, vocals, acoustic guitar, F/X keyboard, production
- Jeff Trott – writing, electric guitar, acoustic guitar, lap steel guitar, bass, drum programming, production
- Liz Phair – guest vocals
- Tim Smith – backing vocals
- Jeff Anthony – drums, drum programming
- Trina Shoemaker – recording
- Eric Tew – recording
- Andy Wallace – mixing
- Steve Sisco – mixing assistant
- Howie Weinberg – mastering
- Mark Seliger – artwork photography
- SMOG – artwork design

== Charts ==
=== Weekly charts ===
Weekly chart performance for "Soak Up the Sun"
Chart (2002)	Peak position
Australia (ARIA)	88
Austria (Ö3 Austria Top 40)	15
Belgium (Ultratip Bubbling Under Wallonia)	17
Canada (Nielsen SoundScan)	24
Canada (Nielsen BDS)	2
Croatia (HRT)	7
Europe (Eurochart Hot 100)	70
France (SNEP)	51
Germany (GfK)	96
Ireland (IRMA)	36
Netherlands (Dutch Top 40 Tipparade)	9
Netherlands (Single Top 100)	76
New Zealand (Recorded Music NZ)	19
Quebec (ADISQ)	4
Romania (Romanian Top 100)	39
Scottish Singles Sales (Official Charts)	11
Switzerland (Schweizer Hitparade)	15
UK Singles (Official Charts)	16
US Billboard Hot 100	17
US Adult Alternative Airplay (Billboard)	1
US Adult Contemporary (Billboard)	5
US Adult Pop Airplay (Billboard)	1
US Dance Club Songs (Billboard) Victor Calderone & Mac Quayle mixes	1
US Pop Airplay (Billboard)	15

=== Year-end charts ===
2002 year-end chart performance for "Soak Up the Sun"
Chart (2002)	Position
Canada Airplay (Nielsen BDS)	2
Switzerland (Schweizer Hitparade)	94
US Billboard Hot 100	35
US Adult Contemporary (Billboard)	16
US Adult Top 40 (Billboard)	3
US Mainstream Top 40 (Billboard)	52

2003 year-end chart performance for "Soak Up the Sun"
Chart (2003)	Position
US Adult Contemporary (Billboard)	12

== Certifications ==
Certifications and sales for "Soak Up the Sun"
Region	Certification	Certified units/sales
Australia (ARIA)	Gold	35,000^{‡}
New Zealand (RMNZ)	Gold	15,000^{‡}
United States (RIAA)	Gold	500,000^{*}
^{*} Sales figures based on certification alone.^{‡} Sales+streaming figures based on certification alone.

== Release history ==
Release dates and formats for "Soak Up the Sun"
Region	Date	Format	Label	ID	Ref.
United States	February 11, 2002	Radio	A&M	—N/a	
Australia	March 25, 2002	CD	A&M	497 688-2	
Europe	March 25, 2002	CD	A&M	497 688-2	
Europe	March 25, 2002	Maxi-CD	A&M	497 721-2	
Japan	March 27, 2002	CD	A&M	UICA-5001	
United Kingdom	April 1, 2002	CD: CD1	A&M	497 704-2	
United Kingdom	April 1, 2002	CD: CD2	A&M	497 705-2	
United Kingdom	April 1, 2002	Cassette	A&M	497 705-4	
Mexico	2002	CD	A&M	497 688-2	
Mexico	2002	Maxi-CD	A&M	497721-2	
South Africa	2002	Maxi-CD	A&M	MAXCD 391	
