= Girls Can't Catch =

British girl group

- Origin: United Kingdom
- Genres: Pop
- Years active: 2009–2010
- Label: Polydor/Fascination
- Past members: Daizy Agnew; Jess Stickley; Phoebe Brown
- Website: GirlsCantCatch.com

Girls Can't Catch were a British girl group. Their debut single, "Keep Your Head Up", entered the UK Singles Chart at number 26. Their second single, "Echo", was released on 18 January 2010, debuting at number 19 on the chart. The band were dropped by their record company, Polydor Records, on 12 July 2010. They disbanded a day later.

== History ==
The girls were scouted by their label, Polydor, and then were asked to be in a new girl band. One founding member of the group, Phoebe Brown, was previously in a girl group called Hope, which rose to fame on The X Factor. Hope made it into the live shows, but were the seventh act eliminated (fifth place overall). Jess Stickley was scouted from the Motorokr competition, in which she travelled to New York with a group of other finalists to record with huge names of the industry. Girls Can't Catch also included Daizy Agnew of MTV's Urban Base. She was voted winner of the original Hugo Urban Rules in 2006 hosted by Trevor Nelson. Agnew has since gone back to her family name, Dance (her father, Richard Dance, died shortly after the group disbanded). Agnew went on to write and release music with AudioFreaks and Dave Doyle the musical directors behind the hit TV show The Big Reunion and wrote a top 5 dance hit 'Pennys Falling' with Silverland. In 2018, Agnew became a judge on the hit BBC one Saturday night entertainment show 'All Together Now', hosted by funny man Rob Beckett alongside Geri Halliwell and a panel of industry experts.

The girls recorded their debut album in 2009 and 2010. The group's first notable performance was as the opening act for Girls Aloud on their Out of Control Tour. Their Soft Cell inspired debut single, "Keep Your Head Up", was released on 3 August 2009 and entered the UK Singles Chart at number 26. They performed at the iTunes Festival, performing their second single, "Echo". In November 2009, they were the opening act in the UK for the Jonas Brothers on the European leg of their sold-out world tour. In March 2010, the girls headlined National Student Pride in Brighton. It was reported on 12 July 2010 that the band had been dropped by their record label. The following day, the group announced on their website that they had disbanded. Their unreleased album was leaked at the time of the split. It included "Turn Me Up", a song co-written by Shaznay Lewis, and "Alone", co-written by Pixie Lott, as well as covers of Sarah Connor's "You're The Kinda Man" and Santigold's "L.E.S. Artistes".

== Reunion ==
In June 2014, to mark the fifth anniversary of the "Keep Your Head Up" video release, the girls reunited for a final interview with Adam Iqbal in which they revealed that there were no plans for a Girls Can't Catch reunion and that it was very unlikely that there would ever be. They all confirmed that they were working on different solo projects, including recording new music.

== Discography ==
=== Singles ===
Year	Title	Peak position
Year	Title	UK
2009	"Keep Your Head Up"	26
2010	"Echo"	19
