= Michael Rice (singer) =

English singer (born 1997)

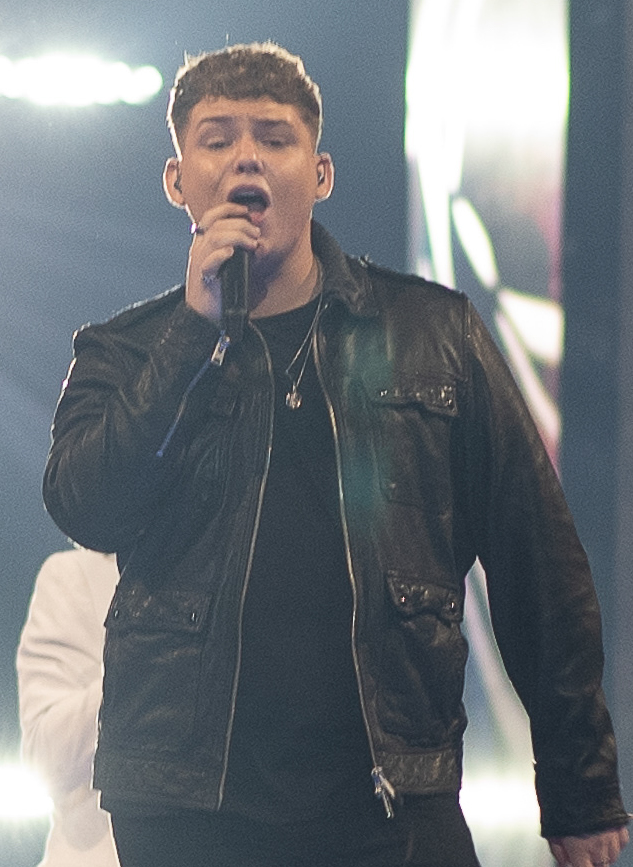

Background information
- Born: 25 October 1997 (age 28); Hartlepool, England
- Genre: Pop
- Occupation: Singer
- Years active: 2014–present

Michael Rice (born 25 October 1997) is an English singer. He represented the United Kingdom at the Eurovision Song Contest 2019 in Tel Aviv, Israel with the song "Bigger than Us". Prior to this, he won the first series of BBC One's singing competition All Together Now in 2018, and also appeared in the eleventh series of The X Factor in 2014. In 2024, Rice auditioned for the 22nd season of American Idol.

== Career ==
=== 2014–2018: The X Factor and All Together Now ===
In 2014, Rice entered series 11 of The X Factor in the United Kingdom. He auditioned for the show with "I Look to You" by Whitney Houston. He was eliminated following the Bootcamp stage. In 2018, he entered the first series of BBC One's singing competition All Together Now; he went on to win the competition.

All Together Now performances and results
Show	Song choice	Score	Result
Heat 1	"Proud Mary" by Creedence Clearwater Revival	100	1st
Final	"Crazy in Love" by Beyoncé ft. Jay-Z	95	1st
Final	"Hallelujah" by Leonard Cohen	94	Winner

=== 2019–present: Eurovision Song Contest and American Idol ===
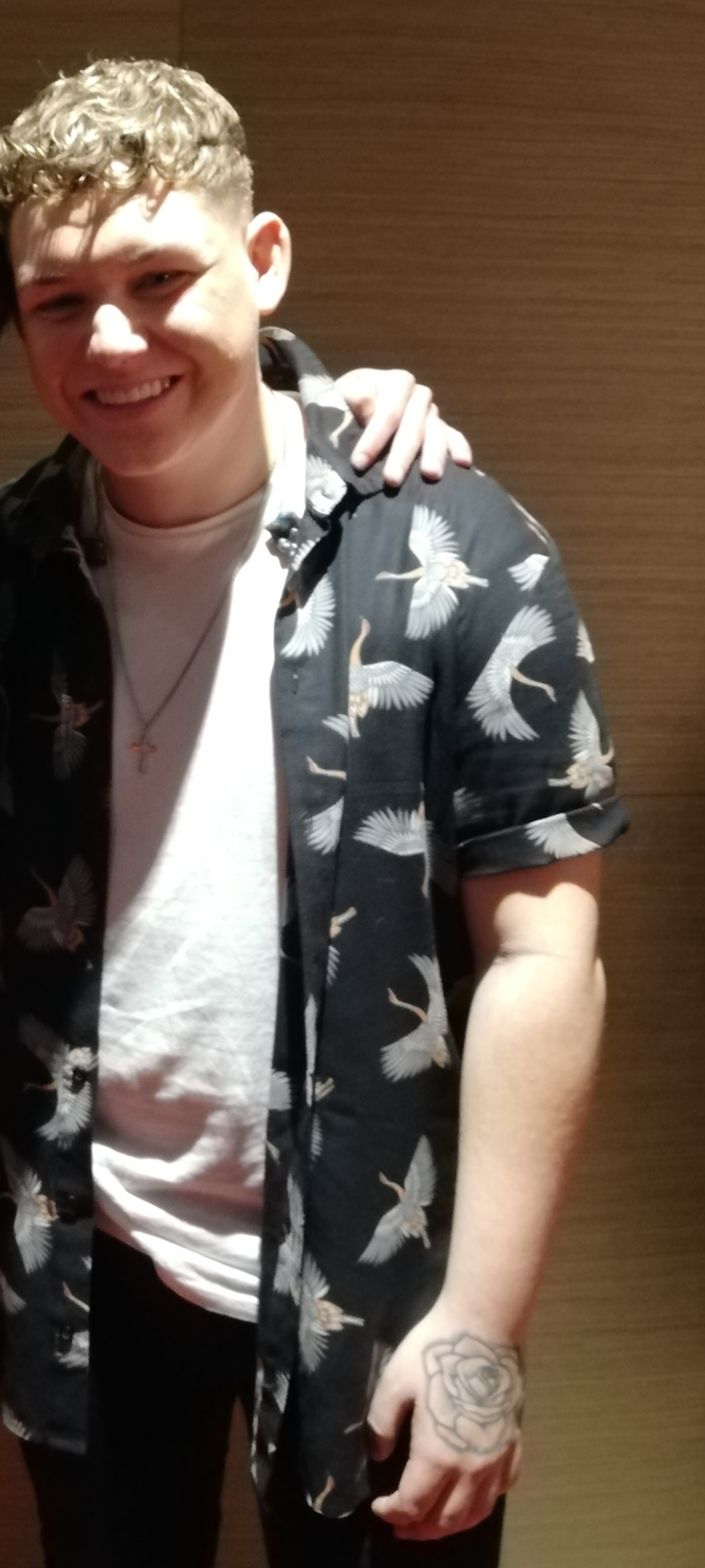
Rice in Moscow (Crocus City Hall) in 2019

In January 2019, Rice was confirmed as one of six artists competing in Eurovision: You Decide, the British national selection show for the Eurovision Song Contest 2019. On 8 February 2019, he won Eurovision: You Decide with the song "Bigger than Us", written by Laurell Barker, Anna-Klara Folin, John Lundvik and Jonas Thander, and represented the United Kingdom in the Eurovision final in Tel Aviv, Israel and came in last position with 11 points.

On the seventh ABC season (or the 22nd overall) of American Idol in 2024, Rice auditioned with the song "Because of You" by Kelly Clarkson, receiving 'yes' votes from all three judges: Lionel Richie, Katy Perry, and Luke Bryan. This earned him a golden ticket, advancing him to Hollywood week. He was not seen singing again during the Hollywood rounds however, and was eliminated during the final judgment alongside another British contestant competing by way of visa: former The X Factor series 15 runner-up, Scarlett Lee.

American Idol performances and results
Episode	Song choice	Artist	Result
Audition	"Because of You"	Kelly Clarkson	Advanced

== Discography ==
=== Singles ===
As lead artist

Title	Year	Peak chart positions			Album
Title	Year	UK Down.	SCO	SWE Heat.	Album
"Lady"	2017	—	—	—	Non-album singles
"Bigger than Us"	2019	27	35	8	Non-album singles
"Somebody"	2019	—	—	—	Non-album singles
"Think of Me"	2020	—	—	—	Non-album singles
"Breaking Free"	2020	—	—	—	Non-album singles
"Falling for You" (with HalfTraxx)	2021	—	—	—	Non-album singles
"Wasted Youth"	2021	—	—	—	Non-album singles
"Did You Even Love Me"	2021	—	—	—	Non-album singles
"Chasing Shadows"	2022	—	—	—	Non-album singles
"Boy I Used to Know"	2023	—	—	—	Non-album singles
"Because of You"	2024	—	—	—	Non-album singles
"Turning Tables"	2024	—	—	—	Non-album singles

As featured artist

Title	Year	Album
"I Won't Stumble Back" (Maison & Dragen featuring Michael Rice)	2016	Non-album single
"Bruised" (Power Of Muzik featuring Michael Rice, Asher Knight, Luena Martinez, Ben Ofoedu & Angels N Bandits)	2018	Non-album single

Preceded by SuRie with "Storm"	United Kingdom in the Eurovision Song Contest; 2019	Succeeded by James Newman with "My Last Breath"
