= Perfume (Parade song) =

Single by Parade

from the album Parade
- Released: 17 June 2011
- Recorded: 2010–11
- Genre: Pop
- Length: 3:07
- Label: Warner Music UK
- Songwriter(s): George Hannides, Anthony McLean

Parade singles chronology
"Louder" (2011)	"Perfume" (2011)	"Light Me Up" (2012)

"Perfume" is the second single by British girl group Parade. It was released on 17 June 2011 as a digital download in the United Kingdom. On 26 June 2011, the song entered the UK Singles Chart at No. 38 before falling out of the top 100 altogether.

== Critical reception ==
Lewis Corner of Digital Spy said, "Must be my perfume, my perfume, my perfume/That's what they like," cantillate the glamorous five-some while wistfully pondering about their fellas over feather-light beats and an overly insistent horn, courtesy of production trio The Fairground. Our verdict? Despite the catchy-as-cholera hook the track lacks any real conviction or 'tude - in fact, we doubt a line like "bringing all the boys and they're dropping all their toys" would ever be given the Spice seal of approval. Third time lucky perhaps? He awarded the song three stars.

== Music video ==
A music video to accompany the release of "Perfume" was first released onto YouTube on 18 May 2011 at a total length of three minutes and twelve seconds. The music video was directed by Emil Nava and shows Parade walking down the streets of London with a large group of partygoers following them. Later, Parade are seen with the previous partygoers dancing and having fun on a boat. In the video Big Ben and the London Eye can be seen.

== Live performances ==
While Parade are touring, Perfume was part of a set list of songs including a cover of Cee Lo Green's "Forget You", a song called Rollercoaster, and an original acoustic song called Rokstar performed by the group, as well as their song Louder, which is their first single that reached the number 10 spot on the uk top 40 charts.

== Track listing ==
iTunes download
No.	Title	Length
1.	"Perfume"	3:07
2.	"Perfume" (D'n'A Remix)	6:33
3.	"Perfume" (Wideboys Remix Edit)	3:18
4.	"Perfume" (Moto Blanco Remix)	7:06
5.	"Perfume" (Wideboys Dub)	5:24
6.	"Perfume" (Music Video)	3:06

CD 1

1. "Perfume" – 3:08
2. "Just a Boy" – 3:23

CD 2

1. "Perfume" – 3:08
2. "Perfume" (D'N'A Remix) – 6:33
3. "Perfume" (Wideboys Remix Edit) – 3:19
4. "Perfume" (Moto Blanco Remix) – 7:07

== Charts ==
Chart (2011)	Peak position
Scotland (OCC)	36
UK Singles (OCC)	38

== Release history ==
Region	Date	Format
United Kingdom	17 June 2011	Digital Download
