= The Hit List (game show) =

British music game show

- Genre: Music game show
- Presented by: Rochelle Humes; Marvin Humes
- Country of origin: United Kingdom
- Original language: English
- No. of series: 9
- No. of episodes: 60 (inc. 33 specials)

Production
- Production location: BBC Pacific Quay
- Running time: 45 minutes
- Production companies: Tuesday's Child Scotland and BBC Scotland

Original release
- Network: BBC One
- Release: 25 May 2019 – present

The Hit List is a British music game show that puts three pairs of contestants against each other to test their knowledge of music, which began airing on Saturday nights on BBC One on 25 May 2019. The show is hosted by husband and wife Marvin and Rochelle Humes, and it is their first standalone TV show as a couple.

== Format ==
Across three rounds, the contestants attempt to identify huge hits from across the years. The teams must prove their ability to recognise songs from all genres of music for a chance to win £10,000. Throughout the game, a correct answer to a song must consist of its name and its artist.

=== Round One – Five of Five from Five ===
The teams are played a selection of five 5-second clips from hit tracks of each decade (1970s to 2010s or 2020s) and must press their buzzer whenever they recognise a song. A correct answer earns the team one point. Scores in this round carry over to Round Two. From series 8, correctly identifying all five songs results in the team winning £500, regardless of the outcome.

=== Round Two ===
The teams race to reach ten points first, with the last team to do so being eliminated. All songs share a randomly chosen theme. Gameplay is the same as in Round One, though a correct answer entitles the team to a follow-up song, while a miss puts the team on "mute" (locking them out of the song) and gives the opponents a chance to claim the point. The round ends when two teams reach ten points or the Hit List is exhausted; if the latter happens and there is a tie, the affected teams will play one tie-breaker track to decide who advances to the next round.

=== Round Three ===
The two remaining teams must identify a range of song titles and artists by listening to the very beginning of the songs. Each team is given a 45-second clock and takes turns going through several "Hit Lists", each of which has four songs and contains a visual theme – for example, an image of an artist mentioned in the lyrics of a track. Teams also alternate choosing Hit Lists and their songs (the choice order is independent from the play order, so one team may be picking a song for themselves or for their opponents), and once a Hit List is exhausted, a new one is chosen.

This round is played chess clock style – the team in control at any given time must clear a song (or use a "skip") before passing control to the other team, and whoever runs out of time first is eliminated from the game. Teams may give as many answers as they desire for each song until they either provide a right answer or skip. Each team has three skips at the outset, each of which may be used three seconds after the start of each track.

=== Round Four – The Final Chart Rundown ===
The final team attempts to recognise ten songs and artists before the money runs out. The team starts the round with £10,000 available in the prize pot, but after five seconds of each track that is played, the money starts to drop at a rate of £1 per hundredth of a second (£100 per second). If the team can correctly name ten song titles and artists before the money disappears, the pair will go home with whatever is left in the pot; otherwise, the couple will leave with nothing. (In celebrity specials, losing teams leave with £500 for their chosen charities.)

== Transmissions ==
=== Series ===
Series	Start date	End date	Episodes
1	25 May 2019	29 June 2019	6
2	16 November 2019	1 February 2020	6
3	26 September 2020	29 May 2021	12
4	2 October 2021	13 November 2021	6
5	16 July 2022	10 September 2022	6
6	1 July 2023	2 September 2023	6
7	17 August 2024	21 September 2024	6
8	19 July 2025	23 August 2025	6
9	15 August 2026	2026	6

=== Specials ===
Date	Entitle
28 December 2019	Celebrity Special
14 November 2020	Celebrity Special
31 December 2020	Celebrity Special
4 September 2021	Celebrity Special
11 September 2021	Celebrity Special
18 September 2021	Strictly Come Dancing Special
27 November 2021	Strictly Come Dancing Special
11 December 2021	Christmas Special
1 January 2022	Noughties Special
24 September 2022	Strictly Come Dancing Special
1 October 2022	Celebrity Special
8 October 2022	Celebrity Special
15 October 2022	Celebrity Special
10 December 2022	Celebrity Special
17 December 2022	Christmas Special
13 May 2023	Eurovision Special
10 June 2023	Celebrity Special
17 June 2023	Celebrity Special
24 June 2023	Celebrity Special
9 September 2023	Strictly Come Dancing Special
23 December 2023	Christmas Special
5 April 2025	Celebrity Special
3 May 2025	Celebrity Special
10 May 2025	Celebrity Special
24 May 2025	Celebrity Special
31 May 2025	Celebrity Special
7 June 2025	Celebrity Special
30 August 2025	Celebrity Special
6 September 2025	Celebrity Special
13 September 2025	Celebrity Special
25 July 2026	Celebrity Special
1 August 2026	Celebrity Special
8 August 2026	Celebrity Special

== International versions ==
International format and distribution rights are held by Keshet International.

Country	Name	Presenter(s)	Channel	Premiere	Finale
Finland	Hitlist	Esko Eerikäinen and Shirly Karvinen	MTV3	8 November 2019	3 January 2020
France	Hit List	Élodie Gossuin and Issa Doumbia	Gulli	8 January 2025	2 March 2025
Netherlands	De Hit Kwis	Romy Monteiro and Kees Tol	NPO 1	21 July 2020	28 August 2020
Spain	Hit List	Mariam Hernández and Iván Torres (2024); Iván Torres and Thania Gil (2025–2026)	Televisión Canaria	29 February 2024	20 May 2026
Spain	Hit List Galicia	Míriam Rodríguez and Rafa Durán	TVG	3 December 2024	25 April 2026
