= R/AmItheAsshole =

Reddit forum for judgement of behavior

r/AmItheAsshole
- Website type: Subreddit
- Available in: English
- Creator: Marc Beaulac
- Website: www.reddit.com/r/AmItheAsshole
- Users: 24.5 million members (as of 17 August 2026)
- Launched: June 8, 2013; 13 years ago

r/AmItheAsshole, abbreviated as AITA, is a subreddit where users post about their real-world interpersonal conflicts and receive judgement from fellow redditors. The subreddit allows users to solicit and express opinions about the appropriateness of the actions of people in specific scenarios – especially the actions of the person reporting about the situation.

== History ==
The subreddit was created in 2013 by photographer and dog rescuer Marc Beaulac to determine if he had been inappropriately mansplaining in a debate with female coworkers about the temperature of their office. The subreddit gained popularity in of 2018. By July 2019, it had 1 million members, which it dubs "potential assholes". A Twitter account used to repost a curated selection of the posts, until it stopped doing so on 5 January 2023.

r/AmItheAsshole is based around the concept of posting situations from users' personal lives for judgement. Any user (typically from a single-use account referred to as a throwaway) can make a post, beginning with "AITA", asking if they're an asshole for what they did in a situation they were involved in. Other users can judge them with the ratings of YTA (you're the asshole), NTA (not the asshole), NAH (no assholes here), or ESH (everyone sucks here). An example of the conundrums posted is "AITA for switching to regular milk to prove my lactose intolerant roommate keeps stealing from me?" As of October 2020, the subreddit receives about 800 scenarios per day.

Princeton University ethicist Eleanor Gordon-Smith said to The Guardian, "There's something almost thrilling about peeking behind the curtain into other people's lives, hearing their weird thoughts – what they think deep down of their partners, children, friends."

Some posts, such as the December 2021 thread about an orange tabby named Jorts, are shared on other social media platforms, e.g.: Twitter.

In 2023, a group of researchers published a preprint study that used AI to analyze and categorize 369,161 posts and 11 million comments from the subreddit to understand the role of relational obligations in moral dilemmas. A 2025 study on social sycophancy by LLMs published by researchers from Stanford and Carnegie Mellon University used the forum as a dataset.

== Television adaptation ==
In April 2025, it had been announced that British comedian Jimmy Carr would host a panel show on Comedy Central UK based on its format, titled Jimmy Carr's Am I The A**hole?. The subreddit's creator Marc Beaulac was named as an executive producer. Hannah J. Davies wrote in The Guardian that it marks the second show to be based on a subreddit, as the first was Two Sentence Horror Stories on The CW.
