= Parade (group) =

English pop music girl group (2009–2013)

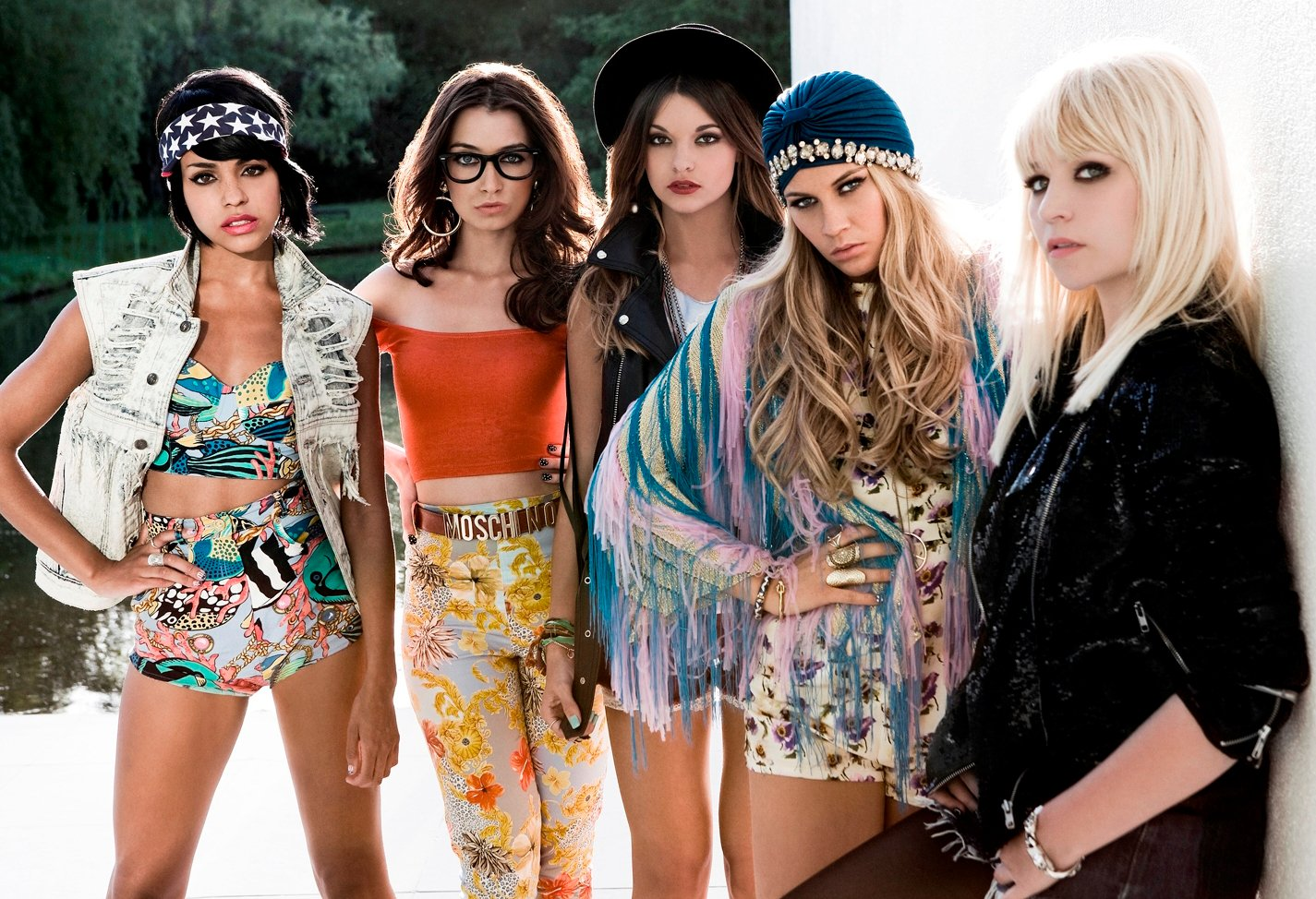
- Parade in 2011

Background information
- Genres: Pop, dance-pop
- Years active: 2009–2013
- Labels: Asylum (2010–2011)
- Past members: Emily Biggs; Lauren Deegan; Bianca Claxton; Jessica Agombar; Sian Charlesworth
- Website: www.paradeofficial.com

Parade were an English girl group who formerly signed to Asylum Records. The group had five members: Emily Biggs, Lauren Deegan, Bianca Claxton, Jessica Agombar and Sian Charlesworth. On 11 February 2013, it was confirmed via the Parade Twitter account the group had disbanded following the departure of Bianca Claxton.

== History ==
=== Before Parade ===
Before joining Parade, Biggs was a member in the girl group Hope and Charlesworth was a member of the girl group City Girls. Agombar also had a role in St Trinian's 2: The Legend of Fritton's Gold.

=== 2009-2011: Parade ===
Their debut single "Louder" reached number 10 on the UK Singles Chart. This was followed by "Perfume" which reached number 38. Their self-titled debut album, Parade, was released in November 2011. The album, despite yielding a top ten hit, underperformed and missed the UK top 100, coming in at a low No. 171. Due to the poor sales of the album, Parade were dropped from Asylum Records. The band became ambassadors of women's football, Clean and Clear and St. Tropez self-tan.

=== 2012: Second studio album and split ===
The group spent 2012 working on their second studio album. They collaborated with successful UK producer Tim Powell, who has written and produced for the likes of Girls Aloud and Sugababes, on tracks including "Light Me Up". According to Twitter posts, they also worked with Ed Drewett, Fred Ball, MNEK, K-Gee, Jamal Hadaway and Tre Jean-Marie.

On 11 July 2012, through their official blog, they announced "Light Me Up" as the first song to be posted online from their new album. It was released as a free download on 1 August 2012.

On 11 February 2013, it was announced through the group's Twitter account that Claxton had decided to leave Parade, and that as a result, the other members had decided not to continue as a group. They also revealed that they were unsigned throughout 2012 to 2013, after being dropped by their record label in 2011. They released an official statement on the subject of their split:

"Dear Fans, we have some news that we're gutted to announce - sadly Bianca has chosen to leave the band. As you all know, the 5 of us make Parade and without all of us together the band would not be the same! We hope you understand that we've made the difficult decision to not carry on without her, as Parade is about the 5 of us girls. We cannot thank our fans enough for your incredible support as without you lot we wouldn't have achieved the success that we've had. In the last year as an unsigned band, we've written and recorded some wicked tracks and as a thank you we'd like to give something back for your love and patience. Watch our facebook page for more information. Thank you for coming on this rollercoaster of a ride with us and look out for us in the future! Love Parade x"

In February 2013, a SoundCloud account under the username "user123330693" leaked a previously unreleased track called "Lose It" which was originally intended to be included on their debut album. The song was reportedly produced by RedOne and heavily samples Reel 2 Real's "I Like To Move It". At a later date the account debuted 4 more new tracks recorded for their unreleased second album called "Chaos", "(Come) On The Double" and "Puppet Master (Dance For Me)". In early March "Throw It Up In The Air", which was part of their setlist for their UK tour when supporting The Wanted, was also released via the SoundCloud user.

=== Performances ===
Parade were the support act for Shakira and Alexandra Burke. They also supported Shayne Ward on his "Up Close and Personal" UK tour in March 2011 and for The Wanted 'The Code' UK Tour 2012. Parade performed on the 'big top' stage at the Isle of Wight Festival 2011, and at the Isle of MTV 2011 in Malta. Parade were one of the supporting acts for the Black Eyed Peas at their Alton Towers Concert on 6 July 2011. The band also supported Westlife and supported Boyzone at Lytham Proms. A second support slot for Boyzone was at the Inverness Show on 27 August 2011. They supported The Wanted on their UK arena tour "The Code" in Spring 2012.

== Post-disbandment ==
After the group disbanded, Agombar and Claxton embarked on solo careers, with Agombar releasing the tracks "Bam Bam" and "Bam Bam Pt. 2" in 2014. Claxton released her debut EP Hi-5 on 17 May 2015 and entered the selection for the UK Eurovision Song Contest entry in 2016. Agombar released her debut EP later in 2015 and has since found success as a songwriter, co-writing "I Love You's" for Hailee Steinfeld, "What a Man Gotta Do" for Jonas Brothers and "Dynamite" for K-pop boy group BTS, which reached number one on the Billboard Hot 100 and internationally. Claxton became a session singer and back up singer and has contributed vocals for artists such as Leona Lewis, Kylie Minogue, Cher, Louise Redknapp, Kim Wilde and Claire Richards; for whom she also wrote the single 'End Before We Start'. She's written songs for Italian artist Paola Lezzi and Swedish artist Dream Beats.

== Discography ==
=== Studio albums ===
Title	Album details	Peak chart positions
Title	Album details	UK
Parade	Released: 11 November 2011; Label: Asylum; Format: CD, digital download	171

=== Singles ===
Year	Single	Peak chart positions			Album
Year	Single	UK	IRE	SCO	Album
2011	"Louder"	10	41	7	Parade
2011	"Perfume"	38	—	36	Parade
