= Steve McQueen (Sheryl Crow song) =

2002 single by Sheryl Crow

Single by Sheryl Crow

from the album C'mon, C'mon
- Released: July 1, 2002
- Studio: Various
- Genre: Rock; pop; country
- Length: 3:25
- Label: A&M
- Songwriters: Sheryl Crow, John Shanks
- Producers: Sheryl Crow, John Shanks

Sheryl Crow singles chronology
"Soak Up the Sun" (2002)	"Steve McQueen" (2002)	"C'mon, C'mon" (2003)

Music video
- "Sheryl Crow - Steve McQueen (Official Music Video)" on YouTube

"Steve McQueen" is a song by American singer-songwriter Sheryl Crow. It is the lead track from her fourth studio album, C'mon, C'mon (2002). It was released as the second single from the album on July 1, 2002. The song reached No. 88 on the US Billboard Hot 100 and became a dance hit, peaking at No. 11 on the Billboard Dance Club Play chart. It also won a Grammy Award for Best Female Rock Vocal Performance, Crow's fourth win in the category. The single's music video was directed by Wayne Isham and features Crow racing around in various vehicles, recreating scenes from Steve McQueen movies.

== Track listings ==
US CD single and UK cassette single

1. "Steve McQueen" – 3:24
2. "If It Makes You Happy" (live from Abbey Road Studios) – 3:45

UK CD1

1. "Steve McQueen" (album version) – 3:24
2. "The Difficult Kind" (live from Abbey Road Studios) – 6:35
3. "If It Makes You Happy" (live from Abbey Road Studios) – 3:45
4. "Soak Up the Sun" (video) – 3:49

UK CD2

1. "Steve McQueen" – 3:24
2. "If It Makes You Happy" (live from Abbey Road Studios) – 3:45
3. "My Favorite Mistake" (live from Abbey Road Studios) – 4:02

European CD single

1. "Steve McQueen" (album version) – 3:24
2. "The Difficult Kind" (live from Abbey Road Studios) – 6:35

== Credits and personnel ==
Credits are lifted from the C'mon, C'mon album booklet.

Studios

- Recorded at various studios in the United States and United Kingdom
- Mixed at Soundtrack Studios (New York City)
- Mastered at Masterdisk (New York City)

Personnel

- Sheryl Crow – writing, vocals, acoustic guitar, maracas, production
- John Shanks – writing, electric guitar, bass, drum loops, percussion loops, samples, production
- Doyle Bramhall II – backing vocals
- Craig Ross – electric guitar
- Steve Jordan – drums, tambora
- Shawn Pelton – drums
- Lenny Castro – congas
- Trina Shoemaker – recording
- Eric Tew – recording
- Andy Wallace – mixing
- Steve Sisco – mixing assistant
- Howie Weinberg – mastering

== Charts ==
=== Weekly charts ===
Chart (2002)	Peak position
Netherlands (Single Top 100)	86
Quebec (ADISQ)	19
Scotland Singles (OCC)	41
Switzerland (Schweizer Hitparade)	77
UK Singles (OCC)	44
US Billboard Hot 100	88
US Adult Alternative Airplay (Billboard)	2
US Adult Pop Airplay (Billboard)	13
US Dance Club Songs (Billboard) Remixes	11

=== Year-end charts ===
Chart (2002)	Position
US Adult Top 40 (Billboard)	48
US Triple-A (Billboard)	12

== Release history ==
Region	Date	Format	Label	Ref.
United Kingdom	July 1, 2002	CD	A&M	
United States	July 15, 2002	Triple A radio	A&M	
Australia	August 19, 2002	CD	A&M	
