= Killer Camp =

2019 game show

- Genre: Whodunit; Game show
- Created by: James Donkin; Ben Wilson
- Directed by: Mike Parker
- Presented by: Bobby Mair
- Country of origin: United Kingdom
- Original language: English
- No. of seasons: 2
- No. of episodes: 13

Production
- Executive producers: Steph Harris; Ben Wilson; Karen Smith
- Production location: Lithuania
- Running time: 45 minutes
- Production company: Tuesday's Child Television

Original release
- Network: ITV2 (season 1); The CW (season 2)
- Release: 27 October 2019 – 8 December 2021

Killer Camp is a British-American game show produced by Tuesday's Child Television. The series' first season aired on ITV2 as a Halloween Special 2019, on the five consecutive nights leading up to Halloween. After licensing the first season in summer 2020, The CW commissioned a second season of the series in March 2021, resulting in it moving to the network as an original.

The second season premiered on The CW on 10 October 2021, as a part of the network's fall 2021 schedule. On 18 October 2021, the series was pulled from the network's schedule after two episodes (the network aired the remaining episodes during its summer lineup), and was replaced by repeats of Masters of Illusion.

== Premise ==
Set in the forests of Lithuania, in a 1980s inspired lakeside lodge, the series follows eleven strangers who believe they are participating in a reality TV show called Summer Camp, however, it was nothing like the camp they imagined, but instead a Killer Camp with a secret murderer among them.

During the day, the contestants are given tasks and games to earn money, however, each night, one of them is murdered. The contestants must simultaneously win games to earn money, while also discovering which one among them is responsible for the murders, before ending up dead themselves.

== Season 1 (2019) ==
=== Contestants ===
Contestant	Age	Hometown	Occupation	Description	Role	Episodes				
Contestant	Age	Hometown	Occupation	Description	Role	1	2	3^{1}	4	5^{1}
Carl	29	Essex, England	Car Dealer	The Tough Guy	Killer	SAFE	RISK	Rob		Sam
Eleanor	22	Chichester, England	Content Executive	The Diva	Innocent	RISK		Rob	SAFE	Sam
Holly	19	York, England	Barista	The Outsider	Innocent			Rob	SAFE	Sam
Jacques	22	Cheshire, England	Wine Tasting Host	The Joker	Innocent			Rob	RISK	Sam
Sian	25	Doncaster, England	Beauty Therapist	The Beauty Queen	Innocent		SAFE	Rob		Sam
Sam	27	Poole, England	Chef	The Vegan	Innocent			Rob		Carl
Rosie	21	Peterborough, England	Healthcare Assistant	The Forensic Nurse	Innocent		SAFE	Sam	OUT	
Rob	28	Devon, England	Projectionist	The Film Geek	Killer^{2}			Sam		
Warren	26	Chester, England	Eyeware Designer	The Gym Bunny	Innocent	SAFE	OUT			
Nurry	23	Bath, England	Piano Student	The Music Nerd	Innocent	OUT				
Feargal	26	London, England	Stay-At-Home Dad	The Nice Guy	Innocent	OUT				

The contestant was in the bottom two, but was not eliminated.
The contestant earned or was given immunity, and was safe from elimination.
The contestant was eliminated.
- ^Note 1: Episodes 3 & 5 each featured a vote at the campfire, where the camper with the most votes would be killed - regardless of their affiliation. These episodes did not feature an Immunity Challenge.
- ^Note 2: Rob was revealed to be the killer as a result of being suspected in Episode 3's vote. A twist was revealed that Rob had been working in cahoots with a second killer the whole time.

=== Episodes ===
No. overall	No. in season	Title	Original release date
1	1	"A Killer in the Camp"	27 October 2019
Eleven British strangers get the shock of their lives when they discover that they are not going on a fun new reality show called Summer Camp, but actually a horror whodunit called Killer Camp. The contestants have to try to earn cash while avoiding being 'killed' and therefore eliminated from the game, all while spending five gruesome nights in an '80s themed US lodge.
2	2	"One in the Eye for the Killer"	28 October 2019
The campmates try to recover from the previous night's shocking killing as their suspicions see bromances broken, alliances forged and a relationship blossom. The campmates battle each other in a disgusting mud pit for cash while trying to procure clues as to the killer's identity. Meanwhile, the killer claims their next victim.
3	3	"A Killer Accusation"	29 October 2019
Suspicions drive the campmates apart as they try to deduce who was behind previous night's murder, while being thrown into freezing lakes, retrieving buoys for cash and playing a horribly awkward game that sees their true opinions about each other shared out loud. The campfire brings another shocking twist as the camp votes for who they think the killer is for the first time before another victim is brutally claimed.
4	4	"A Killer Twist"	30 October 2019
The campers face more fiendish camp activities, including blindly putting their hands inside terrifying boxes for cash, and smacking each other with soaking dodgeballs. During the penultimate campfire, the killer claims their final victim in a jaw-dropping murder.
5	5	"A Killer Finale"	31 October 2019
Events come to a head as two campers clash about the clues they have received and make a final play to convince fellow campers of their innocence. The campmates also vote one last time to guess the killer's identity.

== Season 2 (2021) ==
=== Contestants ===
Contestant	Description	Role	Episodes							
Contestant	Description	Role	1	2	3^{3}	4	5	6^{3}	7	8^{3}
Bella	The Bombshell	Innocent			Lexxi	SAFE		Clyde	RISK	Jaydah
Gabe	The Bro	Innocent		SAFE	Lexxi	RISK	SAFE	Bella	SAFE	Jaydah
Kobie	The Football Player	Innocent	Not in camp					Clyde^{5}		Jaydah
Maura	The Dim One	Innocent			Clyde			Clyde		Jaydah
SJ	The Screamer	Innocent			Lexxi	SAFE		Clyde	SAFE	Jaydah
Jaydah	The Bubbly One	Killer			Maura		RISK	Clyde		Maura
Syrah	The Cowboy	Innocent			Lexxi			Clyde	OUT	
Clyde	The Nerd	Innocent	RISK	SAFE	Lexxi		SAFE	Bella		
Kaleigh	The Cheerleader	Innocent	Not in camp		Gabe^{5}		OUT			
Lindi	The Rocker	Innocent			Lexxi		OUT^{4}			
Valentina	The Flirt	Innocent	SAFE	RISK	Syrah	OUT				
Lexxi Raine	The Blonde	Innocent	SAFE		Clyde					
Jordan	The Tennis Star	Innocent		OUT						
Basil	The Cool Guy	Innocent	OUT							
Sean	The Nice Guy	Innocent	OUT							

The contestant was in the bottom two, but was not eliminated.
The contestant earned or was given immunity, and was safe from elimination.
The contestant was eliminated.
- ^Note 3: Episodes 3, 6 & 8 each featured a vote at the campfire, where the camper with the most votes would be killed - regardless of their affiliation. No immunity challenge was held in these episodes - instead, two campers snuck into Bruce's house to try to win clues to the Killer's identity.
- ^Note 4: Lindi was killed outside of the Campfire as part of the Killer's Double Murder Day "celebration".
- ^Note 5: Kaleigh and Kobie were late arrivals to camp - both were still able to be suspected as Killer.

=== Episodes ===
No. overall	No. in season	Title	Original release date	U.S viewers (millions)
6	1	"A Smashing Sequel"	10 October 2021 (US); 29 November 2021 (UK)	0.16
The 13 new campmates arrive at Camp Pleasant for a reality show with a brutal horror twist. Bromances blossom, a risky love triangle forms and one Camper finds their time is up.
7	2	"Don't Lose Your Head"	17 October 2021 (US); 30 November 2021 (UK)	0.16
The campmates are still reeling from the previous night's shocking 'murder'. The survivors sink to new depths to win cash before battling for immunity from being killed.
8	3	"Killer Tan"	1 December 2021 (UK); 19 August 2022 (US)	0.18
It's vote-off day in Camp Pleasant and the innocent campmates have their first opportunity to expose the killer in their ranks.
9	4	"Murder on the Dance Floor"	2 December 2021 (UK); 26 August 2022 (US)	0.22
The previous episode's dramatic vote-off sends shockwaves through the camp while a surprising new romance blossoms.
10	5	"Double Murder Day (Note: When aired on The CW, the title of the episode is "Next Stop Murder")"	3 December 2021 (UK); 2 September 2022 (US)	0.19
Only nine campers remain as a shocking twist leads to accusations getting personal. A demented see-saw game sees the campers become increasingly unbalanced.
11	6	"Killer Garden (Note: When aired on The CW, the title of the episode is "Scared To Death")"	6 December 2021 (UK); 9 September 2022 (US)	0.14
The campers are forced to eat their words in a disgusting food challenge for cash before entering Bruce's House of Horrors to find more clues to the Killer's identity.
12	7	"Gnome Way Out (Note: When aired on The CW, the title of the episode is "Gnome Sweet Gnome")"	7 December 2021 (UK); 16 September 2022 (US)	0.16
The survivors become a crazed yearbook committee in a challenge with 10,000 dollars at stake, before the Killer claims their final victim.
13	8	"End of a Killer Summer (Note: When aired on The CW, the title of the episode is "A Killer Faces The Chop")"	8 December 2021 (UK); 23 September 2022 (US)	0.23
The campmates vote as to who they think the Killer is. Will the innocents win, or will the Killer fool everyone?

== Broadcast ==
The first season premiered in the U.S. on July 16, 2020, as part of The CW's Summer programming lineup, and a second season was commissioned. However, the second season was pulled from the following fall lineup after the first two episodes (the remaining episodes aired during the summer 2022 lineup). On 29 November, the season was released on ITV Hub with episodes airing concurrently on ITV2. In India, the series aired on Star World in July 2020.

== International version ==
A Dutch version of the show will premiere on Amazon Prime Video and will be produced by Skyhigh TV.
