= Tuesday's Child (company) =

British television production company

- Type: Subsidiary
- Industry: Television
- Genre: Reality television
- Founded: 2012
- Founder: Karen Smith
- Headquarters: London, England, United Kingdom
- Number of locations: 2 (2012)
- Area served: London, England; Glasgow, Scotland
- Key people: Karen Smith (executive producer)
- Owner: STV Group
- Parent: STV Studios
- Website: https://tuesdayschild.tv

Tuesday's Child is a British television production company founded in 2012 by Karen Smith. The company is best known for TV shows such as The Hit List and LEGO Masters. Tuesday's Child is part of the STV Studios group of production labels.

== History ==
Tuesday's Child was founded in 2012 by Karen Smith. It specialises in entertainment and popular factual formats.

== Programming ==
- For What It's Worth
- Guessable?
- Head Hunters
- Jimmy Carr's Am I The A**hole?
- Killer Camp
- LEGO Masters
- LEGO Masters US
- Pitch Battle
- Queens for the Night
- Superstar Dogs: Countdown to Crufts
- The Hit List
- You're Back in the Room

== Awards and nominations ==
Year	Association	Category	Nominee(s)	Result
2023	TV Choice Awards	Best Game Show	The Hit List	Long List
2023	International Format Awards	Best Retuning Format	LEGO Masters	Won
2020	Broadcast Digital Awards	Best Entertainment Category	Killer Camp	Nominated
2020	International Format Awards	Best Returning Format	LEGO Masters Australia	Nominated
2020	Rose d’Or	Studio Entertainment	LEGO Masters US	Nominated
2020	TBI Content Innovation Awards	Entertainment Format of the Year	LEGO Masters	Won
2020	TBI Content Innovation Awards	Competition Show of the Year	LEGO Masters Australia	Won
2020	Primetime Emmy Awards	Outstanding Directing For A Reality Program and Outstanding Picture	LEGO Masters US	Nominated
2020	Primetime Emmy Awards	Editing For A Structured Reality Or Competition Program	LEGO Masters US	Nominated
2020	International Emmy Kids Awards	Non-scripted Entertainment	LEGO Masters UK	Nominated
2016	MIPFORMATS	Best Studio Gameshow	You're Back In The Room	Won
2016	Broadcast Awards	Best Entertainment Programme	You're Back In The Room	Nominated
2015	Royal Television Society Programme Awards	Daytime Programme	Superstar Dogs	Nominated

== International success ==
Tuesday's Child formats have had success internationally, with formats such as LEGO Masters and The Hit List being reproduced in other countries.

- LEGO Masters – the LEGO competition show has so far been commissioned in the US (FOX), Australia (Channel Nine), France (M6), The Netherlands and Belgium (RTL), Germany (RTL), Poland (TVN), Sweden (TV4), Hungary (RTL), New Zealand (TVNZ), China (Shenzhen TV) and Japan (Tokyo Broadcasting)
- The Hit List – the music quiz show has been produced in Finland for MTV3, in Spanish Canary Island on (Television Canaria) and as De Hit Kwis on AVROTROS in The Netherlands.
- For What Its Worth – the antiques-themed quiz show was produced in Germany for ZDF in 2016.
- You're Back in the Room – the hypnosis game show was made in multiple territories, including The Netherlands, France, Australia (Channel Nine), Slovakia, Slovenia, Poland, Colombia, Canada, New Zealand and Portugal. In 2019, It was produced by Tuesday's Child and BBC LA Productions in the US under the name Hypnotize Me and hosted by Taye Diggs featuring hypnotist Keith Barry for The CW Network.
