= Head Hunters (game show) =

British game show

- Genre: Game show
- Directed by: Chris Power
- Presented by: Rob Beckett
- Country of origin: United Kingdom
- Original language: English
- No. of series: 1
- No. of episodes: 30

Production
- Executive producer: Karen Smith
- Running time: 44 minutes
- Production company: Tuesday's Child

Original release
- Network: BBC One
- Release: 7 October – 15 November 2019

Head Hunters is a British television game show produced by Tuesday's Child Television for the BBC. It is hosted by Rob Beckett. The programme was first broadcast on BBC One from 7 October 2019 to 15 November 2019, and was transmitted at 14:15 on weekdays. A repeat of the first series began airing at 1pm on 22 September 2021.
