= STV Studios =

Scottish television production business

STV Studios Limited
- Type: Subsidiary
- Industry: Media
- Founded: August 31, 1957; 69 years ago (as Scottish Television Productions)
- Headquarters: Glasgow, Scotland, UK
- Key people: David Mortimer (Managing Director); Paul Sheehan (Chief Operating Officer)
- Products: Television
- Parent: STV Group
- Subsidiaries: North Star; Blackhill; Big Light Productions; Crackit Productions; Curious Cat; Ferryman Films; Flicker Productions; Hello Halo; Hello Mary; Interstellar; Little Doole; North Star; Owl Power; Primal Media; Rockerdale Studios; Rumpus Media; Tod Productions; Top Hat Productions; Tuesday’s Child; Two Cities Television; Ginger Productions (defunct)
- Website: www.stvstudios.com

STV Studios (previously STV Productions, SMG Productions, and originally known as Scottish Television Enterprises) is a television production group, belonging to the Scottish company STV Group plc. Its headquarters are in Glasgow, Scotland.

== History ==
Founded in 1957 by Canadian newspaper magnate Roy Thomson, Scottish Television Enterprises initially served as the main content provider for the group's flagship ITV franchise, STV.

In the 1960s, its productions were often criticised for perceived low quality. However, the 1970s saw an improvement, and the company became a major provider of religious content for the new Channel 4. The ITV network also began showing Take the High Road nationally, and in 1983, STV produced one of its most well-known programs, Taggart.

In February 2019, STV Productions and Primal Media announced a two-year development deal to develop "large-scale entertainment formats" for the UK market.

In August 2020, STV Productions was rebranded to STV Studios after one year of acquisitions and to expand its growing portfolio of businesses. In September 2020, STV Studios acquired factual entertainment producer Barefaced TV from production group Argonon.

In July 2023, STV Studios acquired London-based Greenbird Media (including the 60% majority stake previously owned by Keshet International) for £21.4 million, giving it majority ownership of Crackit Productions and Tuesday's Child, among other studios.

In 2026, STV Studios rebranded its established production labels as Blackhill (formerly STV Studios Drama) and North Star (formerly STV Studios Factual).
