= All Together Now (British TV series) =

- Presented by: Rob Beckett; Geri Horner
- Country of origin: United Kingdom
- Original language: English
- No. of series: 2
- No. of episodes: 13

Production
- Executive producers: James Fox; Dom Waugh; Andrew Cartmell
- Producer: Marc Bassett
- Production location: Dock10 studios
- Editor: Marc Bassett
- Running time: 60 minutes
- Production company: Remarkable Entertainment

Original release
- Network: BBC One
- Release: 27 January 2018 – 13 April 2019

Related
- All Together Now

All Together Now is a British reality television music competition which first aired on BBC One on 27 January 2018. It was presented by Rob Beckett and Geri Halliwell (credited as Geri Horner). Michael Rice was crowned the winner of the first series on 3 March 2018. A second series was announced on 28 March 2018 and a one-off celebrity special aired on 24 December 2018, with Laurie Brett crowned as winner. In June 2019, the BBC decided to cancel the show after two series.

== Format ==
In every episode, a range of singers take to the stage, but waiting to judge each performance is 'The 100' – a panel of one hundred music experts and performers from across the UK headed up by Spice Girl, Geri Halliwell.

There are six episodes in the series, consisting of five heats and the final.

=== The heats ===
During each heat, performers try and outscore their competitors in order to earn a seat on the top three podium. Whenever a performer scores high enough for a podium place, the act in 3rd place is eliminated as a result.

From each heat, two acts go through to the series final. Once all acts have sung, the performer with the highest score automatically goes through. The acts in 2nd and 3rd sing off against one another and the winner of that sing off earns the second qualification spot.

Prior to filming, all performers choose the song they want to sing. The 100 learn the words to all the songs before the show, but they don't know who is going to come out and sing said songs to them. Each song is approximately 90 seconds long, but the 100 can only join in for the final 60 seconds as signified by a lighting change. This means that the 100 have the same amount of time to join in the singing for every act.

=== Tie-breaks ===
In the event of a tied score, the 100 review the full performances of both acts on monitors in studio. Each member of the 100 decides which act they prefer and votes by pressing their button. The act with the most votes takes their seat on the podium, meaning that the act with the fewer votes either drops down a podium place or exits the competition. In the event that the tiebreak vote is also tied, Geri Horner, as captain of the 100 has the casting vote.

=== The sing-off ===
For the sing-off at the end of the show, scores are reset to zero and the 2nd and 3rd placed acts perform a new song chosen from a given shortlist. In the event that both acts wish to sing the same song from that shortlist, the performer in 2nd place has priority.

=== The final and the prize ===
In the final, the ten finalists (the first placed performer and sing-off winner from each heat) perform again in front of The 100 with a new song. This time, all three acts who finish in the top three podium seats sing again and the act with the highest score after this final sing off wins the series and with it the £50,000 cash prize.

== The 100 and the performers ==
The 100 are a range of music experts and performers from across the UK. They were cast to include a diverse mix of ages, backgrounds and a variety of music genres. As captain of the 100, Geri's vote carries no extra weight. The only time Geri's vote takes precedence is in the case of a tied vote in the Tie Break.

The performers are a mix of soloists and groups. They were cast to include a diverse range of ages, backgrounds and genres, including pop, rock, soul, jazz, big band, musicals, and classical. The casting was open to all and the show attracted performers with minimal public performance experience through to seasoned performers who have appeared on major stages and theatres.

== Series overview ==
To date, 2 series have been broadcast, as summarised below. In early summer 2019, BBC decided to cancel the programme after the second series ended.

| Series | Start | Finish | Winner | Runner-up | Third Place | Presenter(s) |
|---|---|---|---|---|---|---|
| 1 | 27 January 2018 | 3 March 2018 | Michael Rice | James Thompson | Victoria Oruwari | Rob Beckett, Geri Halliwell |
| 2 | 2 March 2019 | 13 April 2019 | Shellyann Evans | Southern Flavor | Bernadette Bangura | Rob Beckett, Geri Halliwell |

=== Series 1 (2018) ===
The inaugural series aired from 27 January 2018 to 3 March 2018. The series was presented by Rob Beckett and Geri Halliwell (credited as Geri Horner). Michael Rice was crowned the winner of the first series.

=== Series 2 (2019) ===
Series 2 began on BBC One 2 March 2019, again with Beckett and Horner presenting. Shellyann Evans was crowned the winner of the second series.

== Specials ==
=== Celebrity Special (24 December 2018) ===
A celebrity special was announced in July 2018 with the line up being announced at the end of November 2018. The special episode aired 24 December 2018.

Running order

| Order | Celebrity | Occupation | Song | Score | Result |
|---|---|---|---|---|---|
| 1 | Gemma Collins | Reality Star | "Big Spender" by Shirley Bassey | 88 | 1st |
| 2 | Ben Foden | Rugby Player | "Shotgun" by George Ezra | 71 | 2nd |
| 3 | Sara Pascoe | Comedian | "It Must Have Been Love" by Roxette | 44 | 3rd |
| 4 | Chris Kamara | Former Footballer | "Your Song" by Elton John | 78 | 2nd (Ben moved to 3rd, Sara eliminated) |
| 5 | Amber Davies | Reality TV Star | "Titanium" by David Guetta ft. Sia | 75 | 3rd (Ben eliminated) |
| 6 | Omid Djalili | Actor | "Sway" by Dean Martin | 97 | 1st (Gemma moved to 2nd, Chris moved to 3rd, Amber eliminated) |
| 7 | Alison Hammond | Showbiz Presenter | "Gold" by Spandau Ballet | 71 | Out |
| 8 | Tyger Drew-Honey | Actor | "You Need Me, I Don't Need You" by Ed Sheeran | 56 | Out |
| 9 | Laurie Brett | Actress | "Wind Beneath My Wings" by Bette Midler | 92 | 2nd (Gemma moved to 3rd, Chris eliminated) |

Sing-Off details

| Order | Name | Song | Score | Result |
|---|---|---|---|---|
| 1 | Gemma Collins | "This Is Me" by Keala Settle and The Greatest Showman ensemble | 39 | Third place |
| 2 | Laurie Brett | "The Best" by Tina Turner | 99 | Winner |
| 3 | Omid Djalili | "Nobody Does It Better" by Carly Simon | 75 | Runner-up |

== Critical response ==
All Together Now has received mixed reviews. Sam Wollaston from The Guardian said: "It's kind of like a pub singalong meets Celebrity Squares. I quite enjoyed it. It doesn't take itself too seriously. There are no promises of stardom; just a bit of a laugh, and 50 grand to the winner. And it's nice to be able to easily work out how well someone's done, as a percentage." Jeff Robson from The Independent said: "With The Voice having moved to ITV, it's clear the BBC is looking for a new show to capture the nation's imagination before Strictly… comes back. They may well have found it. As head judge/MC, Geri Horner generates enough positivity to power a small town but co-presenter Rob Beckett brings a nicely acerbic vibe to counter the showbiz excesses."

Others have been more critical. Michael Hogan from The Daily Telegraph said the show's first episode "fell short" and noted as a positive that it "had the decency not to outstay its welcome". Stuart Heritage of The Guardian called it "alarmingly complicated and pointlessly inconsequential" and "less a programme and more a plea to end an entire genre [televised music competitions] for good". Carol Midgely of The Times said: "I haven't seen such toe-curling, 'make it stop' TV since Len Goodman's Partners in Rhyme. Whoever thought of having 100 judges deserves to be tied to a chair and forced to watch both shows on a loop. For a week."

== International versions ==
The format that began in 2018, with a British television series on BBC One, has been adapted by television stations in many other countries. The first adaptation was the Brazilian series known as Canta Comigo, this was followed by Danish and Australian editions under the title All Together Now and a Polish edition titled Śpiewajmy razem. All Together Now all of which aired in 2018.

Starting in 2019, many other countries have scheduled local editions including Colombia (A Otro Nivel: Canta Conmigo), Brasil (Canta Comigo), France (Together, tous avec moi), Germany (Sing Mit Mir), Italy (All Together Now), Netherlands (All Together Now), Romania (Cântă acum cu mine), Russia (Ну-ка, все вместе!) and Finland (All Together Now Suomi)

Starting in 2021, Malaysia has scheduled its own version with the title "All Together Now Malaysia" and Malaysia is the first country in Asia to have its own version of All Together Now on Astro Ria with 10 episodes starting from 6 June 2021. Also Portugal aired its own version on 7 March 2021.

And Ukraine aired its own version (Співають всі) on 21 August 2021. Star guests were among others Go_A, Ruslana, Julia Sanina and Olya Polyakova
