= Parade (Parade album) =

Studio album by Parade
- Released: 11 November 2011
- Recorded: 2010–2011
- Genre: Dance-pop
- Length: 44:18
- Label: Asylum
- Producer: The Fairground

Singles from Parade
- 1. "Louder" Released: 7 March 2011; 2. "Perfume" Released: 17 June 2011

Parade is the self-titled debut studio album by British girl group Parade. The album was released on 11 November 2011, by Asylum Records. It missed the top 100 of the UK Albums Chart, charting at No. 171 which led to the band being dropped from the record label.

== Singles ==
Two singles were released from the album, the first being "Louder" which was released on 7 March 2011. It debuted at number 10 on the UK Singles Chart, and also charted at number 41 in Ireland. "Perfume" was released on 17 June 2011 as the album's second single. The song peaked lower than its previous single reaching number 38 on the UK Singles Chart.

== Track listing ==
No.	Title	Writer(s)	Producer(s)	Length
1.	"Louder"	Alan Sampson, Kuk Harrell, George Hannides, Anthony McLean	The Fairground	2:53
2.	"Like You"	Herbie Crichlow, Sampson, Hannides	The Fairground	3:27
3.	"Ticking on It"	Sampson, Hannides	The Fairground	3:28
4.	"Perfume"	McLean, Hannides	The Fairground	3:07
5.	"Just a Girl"	Angelina 'Jipse' Roz Rozhdestvina, Lev Rozhdestvin	Richard Cassell, Eric Appapoulay	2:42
6.	"Knock on My Door"	James Tadgell, Jon Clare, Vanya Taylor	All About She	3:28
7.	"Stars"	Frankie Storm, Devinwade, Traxx Trigga	Sandy Vee	3:13
8.	"Mr Right Now"	Julian Lowe, Isaiah Freeman, Dwanna Orange, Michael Fonseca, Dylan Lloyd	Omega and Inkwell	3:18
9.	"Shoes"	Sak Pase	Pase	4:00
10.	"Pretty Ugly"	Greg Kurstin, Lauren Christy, Gary Clark, Graham Edwards, Scott Alspach	Kurstin	3:42
11.	"Weatherman"	Shama Joseph, Theron Thomas, Timothy Thomas, Ray Hedges, Nigel Butler	Shama "Sak Pase" Joseph	3:19
12.	"Yes You Are"	Sampson, Hannides	The Fairground	2:46
13.	"Rokstar"	Shahid Khan, Emeli Sande	Naughty Boy	3:27
14.	"Rollercoaster"	Shama Joseph, Theron T., Timothy T.	Shama "Sak Pase" Joseph	3:29

== Chart positions ==
Chart (2011)	Peak position
UK Albums Chart	171
