= Echo (Girls Can't Catch song) =

Single by Girls Can't Catch
- B-side: "Love Shy"
- Released: 14 January 2010
- Recorded: 2009
- Studio: EMI Publishing Studios
- Genre: Pop, electropop
- Length: 3:25
- Label: Polydor/Fascination
- Songwriter(s): Alan Kasirye, Viktoria Hansen
- Producer(s): Alan Nglish

Girls Can't Catch singles chronology
"Keep Your Head Up" (2009)	"Echo" (2010)

"Echo" is the second and final single by British girl group Girls Can't Catch. It was released on 14 January 2010.

== Music video ==
The music video was shot the week beginning 9 November 2009. Fans were allowed to post video ideas for the music video. Whoever won was allowed to visit the girls on the set of the music video, and get a makeover. The video premiered on 3 December 2009. It has been selected as the VIP Track of the Week on The Box, 4 Music and Smash Hits on 3 December 2009. The video features the girls performing on top of the White Cliffs of Dover with everything they sing echoing over the water, which relates to the lyrics of the song.

== Track listing ==
CD1

1. "Echo" (Radio Edit) – 3:23
2. "Love Shy"

CD2

1. "Echo" (Radio Edit) – 3:23
2. "Kimberley Walsh From Girls Aloud Interview With GCC Part 2"
3. "Video - Behind-The-Scenes At The Jonas Brothers Tour"
4. "Echo" (Music Video)

Digital EP

1. "Echo" (Love II Infinity Remix) – 6:50
2. "Echo" (Nu Addiction Remix) – 6:56
3. "Echo" (Ruff Loaderz Remix) – 5:57

iTunes Single

1. "Echo" (Radio Edit) – 3:23
2. "Echo" (Live From London)

== Chart performance ==
"Echo" was available to download digitally as of 17 January 2010 and released physically on 18 January 2010. It entered the UK Singles Chart on 24 January 2010 and went straight to #19. On 31 January 2010, "Echo" fell 13 places to #32, and on its third week, "Echo" dropped to #49, meaning the single has only spent 2 weeks in the UK Top 40. In Scotland, the song reached number 15.

Chart (2010)	Peak position
Scotland (OCC)	15
UK Singles (OCC)	19
