= Shellyann Evans =

Welsh singer

Shellyann
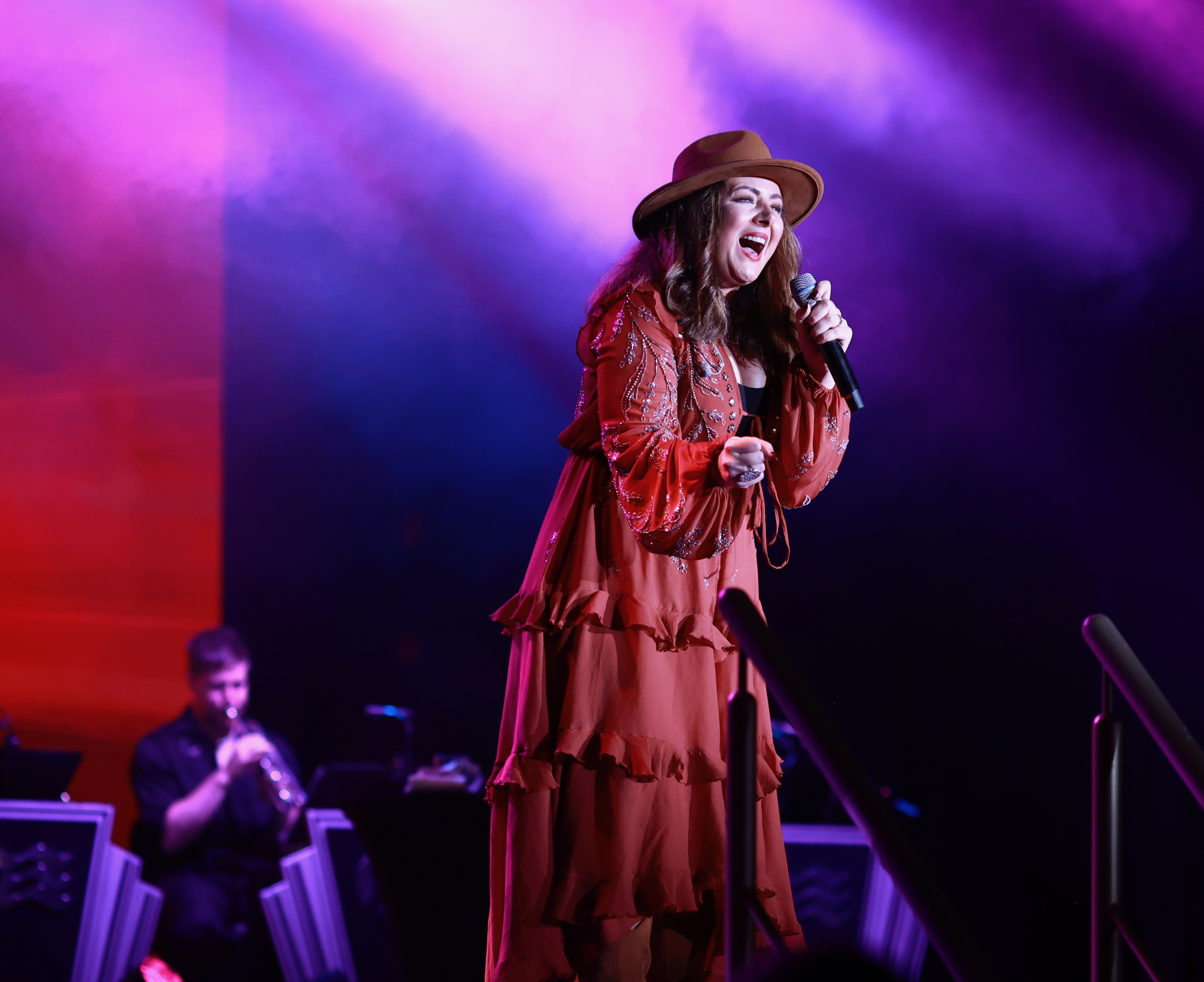
- Shellyann performing in 2023

Background information
- Born: Shellyann Evans; Rhondda, South Wales
- Genres: Pop
- Occupation: Singer
- Years active: 2015—present

Shellyann Evans, known professionally as Shellyann, is a singer from South Wales. She won the second series of BBC One's All Together Now in 2019. In 2015, she appeared on the fourth series of The Voice UK, but was eliminated at the knock-out rounds.

== TV performances ==
The Voice UK performances and results
Show	Song choice	Result
Audition	"Kiss from a Rose" by Seal	Advanced to Team Ricky
Battles (against Hannah Symons)	"Edge of Seventeen" by Stevie Nicks	Lost Battle but stolen by Team Rita
Knockouts	"Firework" by Katy Perry	Eliminated

All Together Now performances and results
Show	Song choice	Score	Result
Heat 4	"Rise Up" by Andra Day	98	1st
Final	"What About Us" by P!nk	99	1st
Final	"Alive" by Sia	100	Winner

== Personal life ==
Evans was born in Rhondda, a valley in South Wales. She currently has 1 son. Her partner's name is Pete, they plan to get married using the money she won from winning All Together Now. She also has 2 stepchildren.
