= Louder (Parade song) =

Single by Parade

from the album Parade
- Released: 7 March 2011
- Recorded: 2010
- Genre: Dance-pop
- Length: 3:32
- Label: Asylum
- Songwriters: Alan Sampson, Kuk Harrell, George Hannides, Anthony McLean
- Producer: The Fairground

Parade singles chronology
| "Louder" (2011) | "Perfume" (2011) |

"Louder" is the debut single by British girl group Parade, which was released on 13 March 2011. It debuted at number ten on the UK Singles Chart, and also peaked at number 41 in Ireland. The music video was filmed in an old house, where they’re throwing a house party, which went on in to the street with fireworks, it was directed by Emli Nava. The song was used in a Rimmel advert.

== Critical reception ==
The song received mixed to positive reviews from the music critics. Lewis Corner of Digital Spy said about Louder: 'A winning mix of insistent beats, pinches of piano and choppy synths, all topped off with a nursery rhyme-style chant of "Turn it up boy, boy, turn it up boy…", 'Louder' bubbles with modern pop fun, but does it offer anything we haven't heard before? Put it this way - The Saturdays needn't worry about eBaying off their Mulberry handbags just yet.' He awarded the song three stars.

== Music video ==
The music video featured the members of Parade having fun at a house party, and in the end they take the party to the streets where they are accompanied by some fireworks. The video was directed by Emil Nava.

== Live performances ==
While Parade are touring, Louder was part of a set list of songs including a cover of Cee Lo Green's Forget You, a song called Rollercoaster, and an original acoustic song called Rokstar performed by the group, as well as their song Perfume, which has been confirmed as their second single.

Their first T.V. performance of Louder was on the National Lottery. Their second major T.V. performance was at the launch of the Nintendo 3DS alongside other performers including Russell Kane and Plan B.

The group debuted the track while there were supporting a number of celebrities including Alexandra Burke, Shakira, Ellie Goulding and Shayne Ward

== Track listing ==
iTunes EP

1. "Louder" (2:53)
2. "Louder" (Wideboys Cut Up remix edit) (3:24)
3. "Louder" (Wideboys Remix) (6:54)
4. "Louder" (Steve Smart & Westfunk remix) (5:24)

Enhanced CD 1

1. "Louder"
2. "Louder" (Wideboys Remix)
3. "Louder" (Steve Smart & Westfunk Remix)
4. "Louder" (Document One Remix Dub)
5. "Louder" (Music Video)

Enhanced CD 2

1. "Louder"
2. "Louder" (featuring Sibley)
3. "Louder" (Wideboys Cut Up Remix)
4. "Louder" (Document One Remix) (featuring Griminal)
5. "Louder" (Karaoke Video)

== Charts ==
| Chart (2011) | Peak position |
|---|---|
| UK Singles (Official Charts) | 10 |
| Scotland Singles (Official Charts) | 7 |
| Irish Singles Chart | 41 |

== Release history ==
| Region | Date | Format |
|---|---|---|
| Ireland | 7 March 2011 | Digital download |
| United Kingdom | 13 March 2011 | Digital download, CD |
