= Got Soul Choir =

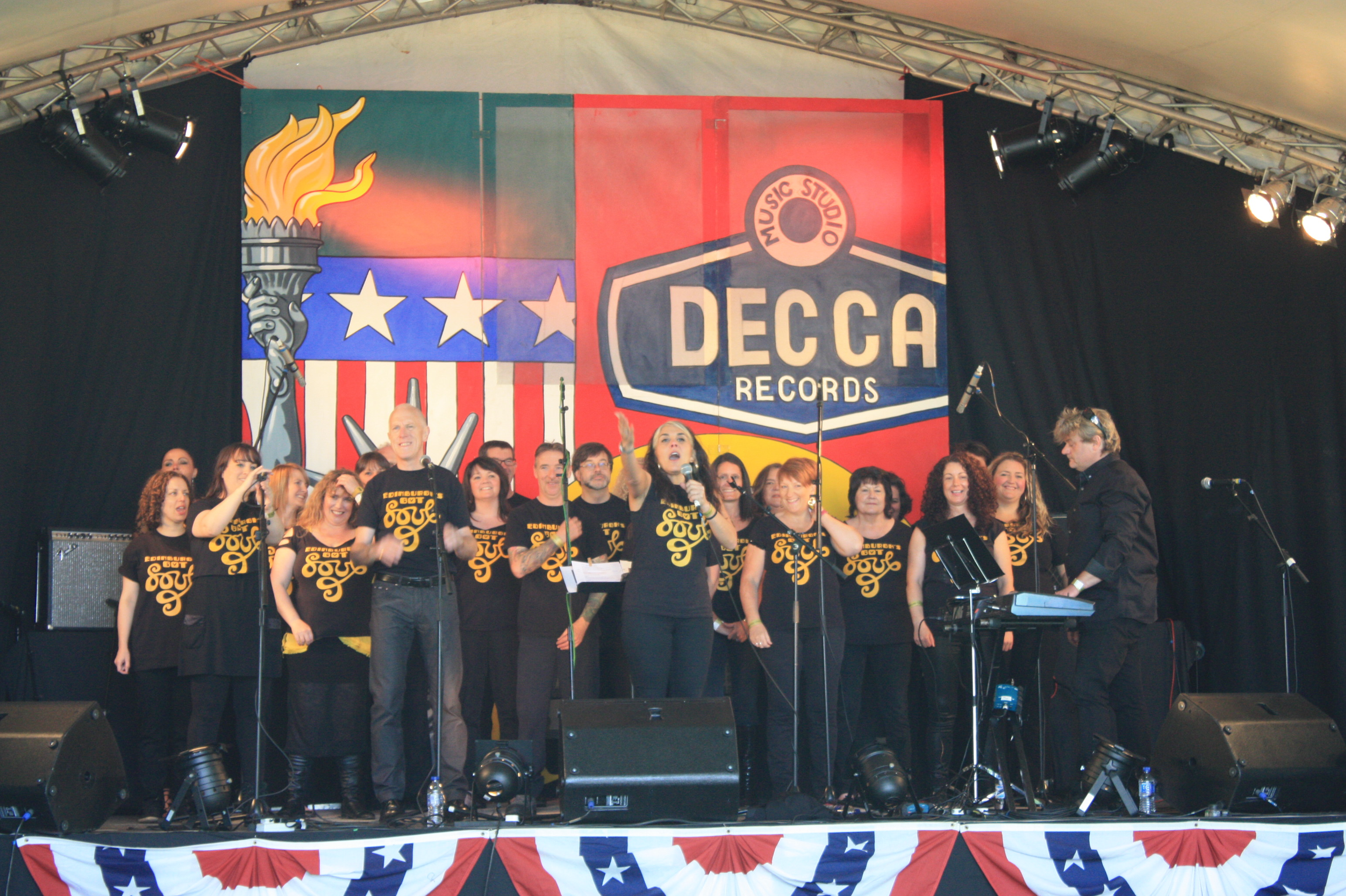
Got Soul Performance Choir at Traquair Fair, 2015

Got Soul Choir is a group of Scottish community choirs singing in the soul and R & B genres. The choir has charitable status (Scottish charity ref: SCO44178). The charity seeks to use music, and specifically choir membership, as a means of addressing loneliness. The choir makes it possible for other charities to raise funds during its concerts.

== History ==
The choir was founded in 2012 by Maryam Ghaffari, who continues to oversee and lead the choirs, with the aid of musical director, Rob Harrison, and several key volunteers. The original choir had only 30 members. The choirs began with Edinburgh’s Got Soul, which is also the largest of the choirs (totalling around 160 in full strength); this was added to in 2016 by the creation of Glasgow’s Got Soul and Dundee’s Got Soul, bringing total membership to around 300.

The Edinburgh branch, contains a smaller core, known as the Performance Choir, who sing at numerous invited events throughout the year, including regular appearances such as the Royal Highland Show and switching on the Christmas Lights on George Street in Edinburgh’s Light Night (which features an audience of up to 20,000). Other notable appearances included Traquair Fair in August 2015 and the Ross Bandstand in Princes Street Gardens (under the shadow of Edinburgh Castle) in May 2014. More exclusive (but still public) events include Harvey Nichols (Edinburgh) Christmas party, and Ocean Terminal, Edinburgh.

The choir made its television debut on 25 October 2016 as part of Gareth Malone’s Gareth’s Best in Britain.

Charities supported by the choir during their fund-raising concerts include Waverley Care, Multiple Sclerosis Therapy Centre Lothian, Scottish Autism, Edinburgh NE Foodbank, Dundee Foodbank, Glasgow SE Foodbank, Macmillan Cancer Support, Children's Hospice Association Scotland and Maggie's Centres.

The climax of their events to date was the sell-out concert at the Usher Hall on 10 December 2016, singing with Mica Paris as soloist to an audience of 2200, and singing to a crowd of 20,000 on George Street in November 2017 to switch on Edinburgh's Christmas lights. The choir also launched the Edinburgh 2017/2018 Hogmanay celebrations with a rendition of Queen's "Don't Stop Me Now".

== Public concerts ==
- St Marks Art Space, Edinburgh (December 2012)
- Soul'd Out – Roxy Assembly, Edinburgh (May 2013)
- Good Times – Queen's Hall, Edinburgh (December 2013)
- Solid Soul – Queen's Hall, Edinburgh (May 2014)
- Soul Celebration – Queen's Hall, Edinburgh; guest soloist Sharlene Hector (December 2014)
- Soul Train – Queen's Hall, Edinburgh; guest soloist Kele Le Roc (May 2015)
- Boogie Nights – Queen's Hall, Edinburgh; guest soloist Sharlene Hector (December 2015)
- 100 Degrees Soul – Queen's Hall, Edinburgh, Queen Margaret Union, Glasgow and Caird Hall, Dundee (May 2016)
- Soul Supreme – Usher Hall, Edinburgh; guest soloist Mica Paris, also featuring a string quintet from the Scottish Chamber Orchestra (December 2016)
- Sizzlin' Soul – O2 ABC Glasgow and Queen's Hall, Edinburgh; guest soloist Sharlene Hector (May 2017)
- Soul Intention – Usher Hall, Edinburgh; with guests Five After Midnight (December 2017)
- Soul Review – Queen's Hall, Edinburgh; with guest Sharlene Hector (May 2018)
- Soul Party – Caird Hall, Dundee; with guests Sharlene Hector and Kevin Mark Trail (December 2018)
