= St. Tropez (self-tan brand) =

Skin tanning products company

St.Tropez Tan
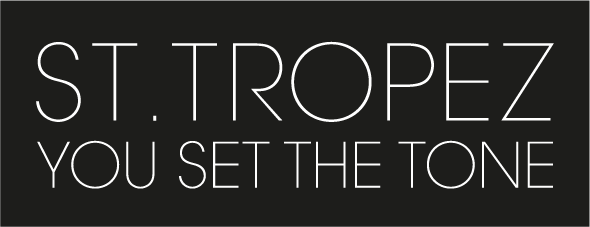
- St.Tropez Tan You Set The Tone Logo
- Product type: Sunscreen, self-tanner
- Current owner: PZ Cussons
- Country: UK
- Introduced: 1996; 30 years ago
- Website: www.sttropeztan.com

St. Tropez is a self-tan brand, specialising in self-tan, skin finishing treatments and bronzing cosmetics. The business was established in 1996. In 2010, it was acquired by PZ Cussons for £62m.

== Product range ==
St Tropez has a range of products which include cosmetics, self-tanning products, skin perfecting & finishing products.

== Philanthropy ==
St. Tropez works closely with the Prince's Trust and helped to raise £90,000 with its sponsorship of its first Spring Ball in 2009. It also participates in the charity’s Million Makers scheme, provides training via its staff for young people looking to gain additional skills in the workplace and has launched a Beauty steering group – led by CEO, Michelle Feeney.

== Skin Smart campaign ==
In May 2009, St Tropez began the Skin Smart campaign by announcing the launch of a new beauty industry lobby group to campaign for stricter regulations on sun beds in the UK. This included the launch of a petition backed by Sian James MP that aims to ban sun beds for under- 18s.

The All Parliamentary Parliament Lobbying Group*, which is being spearheaded by Sian James MP, is calling to ban all unmanned coin-operated sun beds in the UK, prevent any under 18 year old from using sun beds and introduce health and safety regulations for all sun bed shops, gyms and salons.

== Event sponsorship ==
At the 2009, Brit Awards and V Festival, St. Tropez gave performers and VIP’s the chance to experience their new ‘No Tan, Tan’ products backstage. Both events were a huge success, with over 3 gallons of tanning product being used at the V Festival.

== Awards ==
- NewBeauty Magazine Beauty Choice Awards 2013 – Best Self Tanner for a Natural Look
- Star Beauty Awards 2009 – Best Facial Self Tanner
- Sunday Times Beauty Awards 2009 – Best Self Tan for Face and Body
- CEW UK Beauty Awards 2009 – Everyday Body *Woman & Home Beauty Awards 2009 – Everyday Body
- Favorite Sunless Tanning Line – Professional Choice Awards
- Bridal Beauty Awards 2008 and 2009 *Cosmo Girl 2006 – Auto Bronzant *Style 2006 – Whipped Bronze
- In-Style 2006 – Whipped Bronze Mousse
- Debenhams 2006 – Whipped Bronze Mousse – Best 2005/6 – Auto Bronzant
- Cosmopolitan 2005 – Whipped Bronze Mousse
- Cosmopolitan Hair 2005 – Whipped Bronze Mousse
- Cosmo Girl 2005 – Auto Bronzant
- Handbag 2005 – Self Tanning Mousse
