= Keep Your Head Up (Girls Can't Catch song) =

Single by Girls Can't Catch
- B-side: "Stop"
- Released: 30 July 2009
- Recorded: 2008
- Studio: Untouchable Sound Studios
- Genre: Pop, electropop
- Length: 3:31
- Label: Polydor/Fascination
- Songwriter(s): Chris Braide, Nina Woodford
- Producer(s): Chris Braide

Girls Can't Catch singles chronology
"Keep Your Head Up" (2009)	"Echo" (2010)

"Keep Your Head Up" is the debut single by British girl group Girls Can't Catch. It was written by Chris Braide and Nina Woodford, and produced by Braide. It was released on 30 July 2009, and entered the UK Singles Chart at number 26. The single reached the top 5 in the Scottish Singles Chart, peaking at number 4.

The group performed the song at several different events, including GMTV, G-A-Y and the iTunes Festival.

== Music video ==
The music video was filmed and released in June 2009. It features the group playing croquet with three guys at a dump site, singing their verses in different parts of the dump site.

== Track listing ==
iTunes Pre-Order

1. "Keep Your Head Up"
2. "Keep Your Head Up" (Acoustic)

CD1

1. "Keep Your Head Up" (Braide, Woodford)
2. "Stop" (Daizy Agnew, Jess Stickley, Phoebe Brown, Viktoria Hanson, Jonathan Douglas)

Maxi CD-single

1. "Keep Your Head Up"
2. "Kimberly Walsh from Girls Aloud interviews GCC Part 1"
3. "Keep Your Head Up" (Music Video)
4. "Keep Your Head Up" (Riff & Rays Remix Video)

iTunes EP

1. "Keep Your Head Up" (Riff and Rays Club Mix)
2. "Keep Your Head Up" (Soulseekerz Club Mix)
3. "Keep Your Head Up" (Starsmith Club Mix)

Other download stores

1. "Keep Your Head Up"
2. "Keep Your Head Up" (Riff and Rays Radio Edit)
3. "Keep Your Head Up" (Soulseekerz Radio Edit)
4. "Keep Your Head Up" (Starsmith Radio Edit)

== Credits and personnel ==
- Keyboards, guitar, bass, drum programming and percussion: Chris Braide
- Mixing and additional production: Jeremy Wheatley for 365 Artists
- Production: Chris Braide for Braide Productions
- Programming: Chris Braide, Ben Wood, Jeremy Wheatley
- Songwriting: Chris Braide, Nina Woodford
- Additional vocal production and arrangement: Nina Woodford
- Vocals: Daizy Dance, Jess Stickley, Phoebe Jo Brown
- Published by Visible Music Ltd., Sony/ATV Music Publishing Ltd. and Chrysalis Music Publishing Ltd.

== Live performances ==
- G-A-Y — 8 April 2009
- Out of Control Tour — 24 April 2009 - 6 June 2009
- Hollyoaks — 25 June 2009
- Glastonbury Festival — 26 June 2009
- Waterstones, Piccadilly Circus — 4 July 2009
- 5:19 Show — 13 July 2009
- GMTV — 24 July 2009
- Tramlines Festival — 25 July 2009
- iTunes Festival — 27 July 2009
- Loose Women — 29 July 2009
- G-A-Y — 1 August 2009
- The Alan Titchmarsh Show — 4 December 2009

== Charts ==
Chart (2009)	Peak position
Scotland (OCC)	4
UK Singles (OCC)	26

== Release details ==
Region	Date	Label	Format
United Kingdom and Ireland	30 July 2009	Polydor	Digital download
United Kingdom and Ireland	3 August 2009	Polydor	CD single
