= Rob Beckett =

English comedian (born 1986)

- Beckett in 2025
- Born: Robert Anthony Beckett; 2 January 1986 (age 40); Mottingham, London, England
- Education: Canterbury Christ Church University (BSc)
- Occupations: Comedian, actor, presenter
- Television: 8 Out of 10 Cats; All Together Now; Head Hunters; I'm a Celebrity...Get Me Out of Here! NOW!; Wedding Day Winners
- Spouse: Louise Watts (m. 2015)
- Children: 2
- Website: robbeckettcomedy.com

Robert Anthony Beckett (born 2 January 1986) is an English comedian, actor, and presenter. He was a co-host on the ITV2 spin-off show I'm a Celebrity...Get Me Out of Here! NOW! from 2012 to 2014, and a team captain on the E4 panel show 8 Out of 10 Cats from 2016 to 2021. Since 2025, Beckett has been a team captain on the Channel 4 panel show 8 Out of 10 Cats Does Countdown and the narrator of the reality series Celebs Go Dating since 2016. He presented BBC One entertainment series Wedding Day Winners and All Together Now.

== Early life ==
Beckett was born on 2 January 1986 in Mottingham, London. His father was throughout his career a driver of vans, lorries, oil tankers, and cabs. His mother was a housewife throughout his childhood and later worked in a shop.

Beckett went to Edgebury Primary School and then Coopers School in Chislehurst. He attended Canterbury Christ Church University in Kent from 2004-07, where he studied tourism management.

Before his career in comedy began, Beckett undertook a series of minor jobs, including working in a flower market, and working in an office. While working at the latter, he went to a comedy club and decided to have a career in comedy after watching someone perform badly there. He said in 2019: "I entered a competition and I got through and I entered another one. I didn't seek the gig but I kept getting asked back. It was like playing five-a-side football where at first you pay a fiver to play, but then they say 'Well, you don't have to pay now' and then I was getting a fiver to perform. Before I knew it I was offered £40 and it didn't take too long to get to the sort of money I was getting working in an office.”

== Career ==
Beckett started performing stand-up in 2009. His performances led to a third place in So You Think You're Funny, and winning the Amused Moose Laugh-Off which earned him an invitation to perform at the Adelaide Fringe Festival in Australia. In Adelaide, Beckett was nominated for the best newcomer award in 2011. He made his debut at the Edinburgh Fringe Festival in 2012 with his solo show "Rob Beckett's Summer Holiday". In 2011, Beckett made a guest appearance as Mike in the Channel 4 series Fresh Meat.

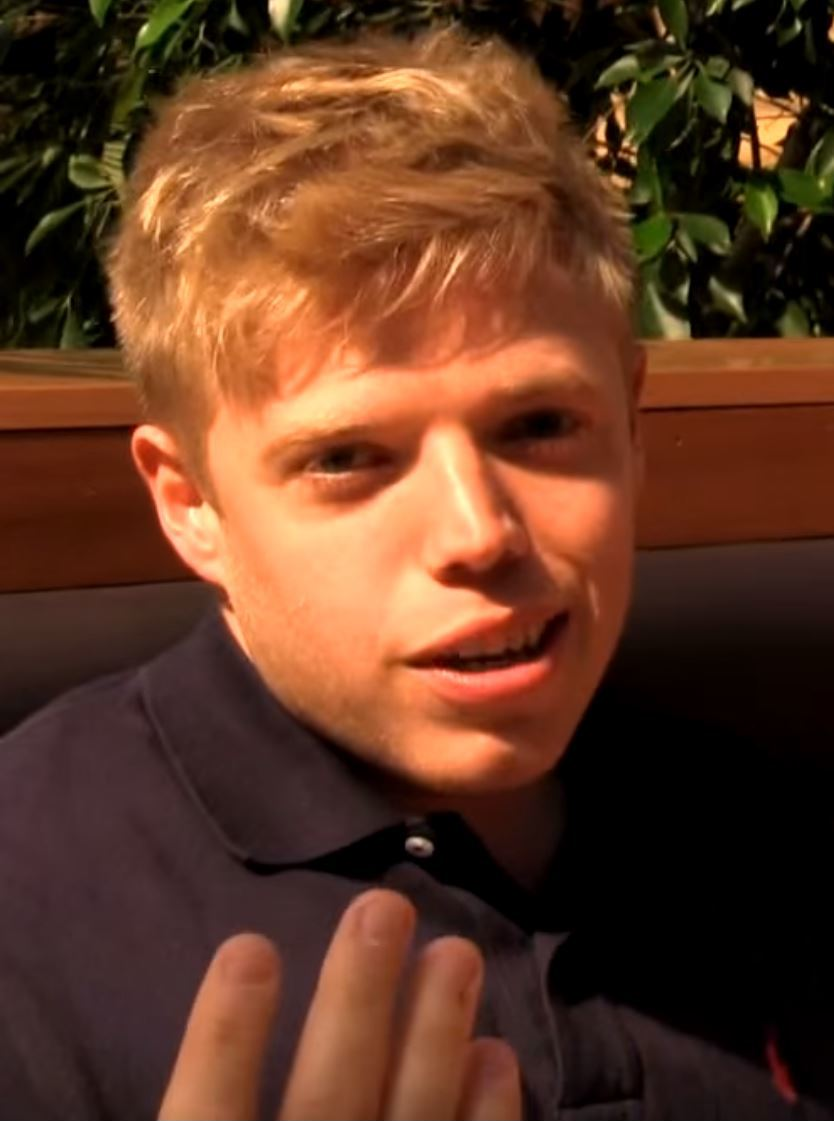
Beckett at the Edinburgh Festival Fringe 2012

From 2012 until 2014, Beckett co-hosted I'm a Celebrity...Get Me Out of Here! NOW!, the ITV2 spin-off from the main show. He presented the show with Laura Whitmore and Joe Swash. He announced his departure from the show in October 2015, to concentrate on his tour. He was replaced by David Morgan.

Beckett also presented the Rock'N'Roll Football Sunday show on Absolute Radio from August 2014 until 2018.

Alongside fellow comedian Ian Smith and former footballer Jimmy Bullard, Beckett hosts UK television channel Dave's comedy-football podcast The Magic Sponge, an irreverent look at the lives of professional footballers. Beckett narrated the 2016 E4 series Celebs Go Dating. In February 2017, the second series of Celebs Go Dating began airing with him writing and narrating once again, this time with some overseas celebrities in tow. Since 2016, Beckett has been a team captain on the More4 panel show 8 Out of 10 Cats.

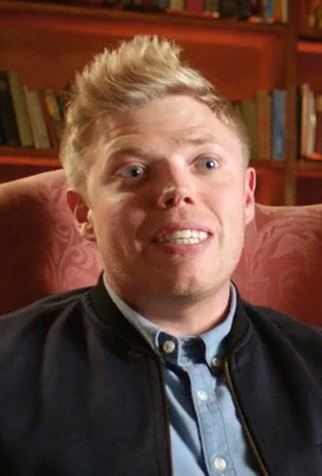
Beckett in 2016

Beckett was a contestant on (and eventual winner of) the third series of Taskmaster, which aired in October 2016. In 2018, he presented Wedding Day Winners, with Lorraine Kelly, and All Together Now, with Geri Halliwell, both Saturday-night entertainment series for BBC One. The following year, Beckett started presenting a Sky TV series Rob & Romesh vs..., in which he and fellow comic and presenter Romesh Ranganathan travel around the world, delve into the lives and careers of celebrities, and take on various challenges.

As of April 2020, Beckett has co-hosted a podcast named Lockdown Parenting Hell, with fellow comedian Josh Widdicombe. The pair frequently interview celebrities regarding the difficulties of parenting during the Coronavirus lockdown. On 20 February 2022, Beckett started his new 5–7pm Sunday Show on BBC Radio 2, a timeslot he shared throughout the year with Paul O'Grady on the Wireless.

In March 2025, he starred in the first series of LOL: Last One Laughing UK, hosted by Jimmy Carr and Roisin Conaty, alongside Richard Ayoade, Sara Pascoe, Lou Sanders, Bob Mortimer, Judi Love, Joe Wilkinson, Joe Lycett, Daisy May Cooper and Harriet Kemsley. Beckett appeared on the second series of The Celebrity Traitors in October 2026.

== Personal life ==
Beckett married Louise "Lou" Watts, a teacher, in 2015. The couple have two daughters. Beckett has two whippets, called Fred and George.

Beckett is a supporter of Arsenal. He has attention deficit hyperactivity disorder and dyslexia.

== Filmography ==
=== Television ===
Year	Title	Role	Notes
2011	Fresh Meat	Mike	
2012–2014	I'm a Celebrity...Get Me Out of Here! NOW!	Co-presenter	3 Series
2013–2016	Mock the Week	Recurring Panellist	5 Series (20 episodes)
2013–present	8 Out of 10 Cats Does Countdown	Panellist, team captain (2025–present)	13 episodes
2016–2017	Taskmaster	Contestant	Series 3 winner & Champion of Champions special
2016–present	Celebs Go Dating	Narrator	8 Series (182 episodes) to date
2016–2021	8 Out of 10 Cats	Team captain	4 series (from Series 19 onwards)
2017	Comic Relief	Co-presenter	1 episode
2017	The One Show	Guest presenter/himself	8 episodes
2017	Comedy Playhouse: Static	Rob	
2017	Anthony Joshua vs Rob & Romesh	Co-presenter with Romesh Ranganathan	
2018	Wedding Day Winners	Co-presenter with Lorraine Kelly	1 Series (6 Episodes)
2018	Rob Beckett's Playing for Time	Presenter	
2018–2019	All Together Now	Presenter	2 series & 1 special
2019	Knock Knock	Presenter	Pilot Episode
2019	Head Hunters	Presenter	1 Series (30 episodes)
2019–present	Rob & Romesh Vs...	Co-presenter with Romesh Ranganathan	
2021	The Great Celebrity Bake Off For Stand Up to Cancer	Contestant	Series 4, episode 1
2021	Rob Beckett's Undeniable	Presenter	
2021–2022	Paul Sinha's TV Showdown	Team captain	2 Series (12 episodes)
2022	Unbreakable	Host	
2022	Queens for the Night	Judge	
2022	DNA Journey	Guest	TV documentary
2023–2024	British Academy Television Awards	Co-host	With Romesh Ranganathan
2024–present	Rob Beckett's Smart TV	Host	Quiz show
2024	Hollyoaks	Sunshine	With Romesh Ranganathan
2024	Rob Beckett's Big Hollyoaks Catch-Up	Host	
2024	Bluey Minisodes	Monty Butler	Minisode Episode 17
2025	LOL: Last One Laughing UK	Contestant	Series 1
2026	Tempting Fortune	Host	Series 3
2026	The Celebrity Traitors	Contestant	Series 2

=== Film ===
Year	Title	Role	Notes
2021	Cinderella	Thomas Cecil	
2023	Epic Tails	Poseidon, Apollo	Voice role; UK dub
2025	Grand Prix of Europe	Enzo	Voice role

=== Stand-up ===
Year	Title	Role	Notes
2012	Rob Beckett's Summer Holiday	Stand-up	Fringe Show
2015–16	Mouth of the South	Stand-up	Tour
2019–21	Wallop	Stand-up	Tour
2022	Wallop	Stand-up	Sky special
2024–26	Giraffe	Stand-up	Upcoming tour
