= 2019 in British television =

This is a list of events that took place in 2019 relating to television in the United Kingdom.

== Events ==
=== January ===
Date	Event
1	BBC One welcomes 2019 with a concert by Madness. The programme pauses at midnight for the Chimes of Big Ben and fireworks display.
1	BBC One airs the New Year's Day special of Doctor Who, titled "Resolution", the last new episode of the programme to be shown until 2020. Overnight ratings suggest the episode to have been watched by an audience of 5.15 million.
1	The fifth series of Luther begins on BBC One. The series attracts criticism from some viewers because of the perceived poor lighting in some scenes that make the content difficult to see. The series is shown over four consecutive nights.
1	ITV introduces its first rebrand since 2013, with "ITV Creates", an artist led ident package, curated by Charlie Levine, with a different artist each week of the year and updated logo and presentation designed by DBLG. Week 1 of "ITV Creates" idents in 2019 is designed by Ravi Deepres.
1	Sky Sports Racing replaces At The Races.
1	Rob Lamarr and Jono Molloy present the final SuperCasino to be broadcast on Channel 5 after almost 15 years. The following night, Channel 5 begins temporarily airing teleshopping through the night to fill in the hours that SuperCasino left. The slot is taken over by 21.co.uk on 16 June.
4	Lisa Riley makes her return to Emmerdale as Mandy Dingle after 17 years.
5	The Greatest Dancer, a new dance competition programme featuring Cheryl, Matthew Morrison and Oti Mabuse on the judging panel, begins. It is the first programme to be created by Simon Cowell to air on BBC One.
5	BBC Two airs the British terrestrial television premiere of Ken Loach's anti-austerity film I, Daniel Blake.
5	ITV announces that ITV3 will broadcast two classic episodes of Emmerdale on weekday afternoons from 21 January.
7	Channel 4 broadcasts Brexit: The Uncivil War, a television film depicting the lead-up to the 2016 referendum that resulted in the vote to leave the European Union. The drama stars Benedict Cumberbatch as Dominic Cummings.
7	ITV launches Week 2 of its "Creates" Ident package in 2019, designed by Sutapa Biswas.
8	Channel 4 takes full control of Box Plus Network. It had previously operated Box Plus Network in a 50/50 joint venture with Bauer Media.
10	Fiona Bruce presents her first edition of Question Time.
10	After winning Strictly Come Dancing in 2018, Stacey Dooley is to present a new programme for BBC Three titled Glow Up: Britain's Next Make-Up Star, a programme searching for a make-up artist.
11	Channel 5 airs Episode 7000 of Home and Away.
14	ITV launches Week 3 of its "Creates" Ident package in 2019, designed by James Brunt.
18	Ant McPartlin returns to work with presenting partner Declan Donnelly following McPartlin's break from television after his arrest for drink driving in March 2018. The pair are reunited at the London Palladium for the auditions part of Britain's Got Talent and later appear in the first of a series of ITV advertisements for Santander Bank.
20	During the third live show of the eleventh series of Dancing on Ice, media personality and businesswoman, Gemma Collins has an on-screen argument with judge Jason Gardiner. Collins accuses Gardiner of selling stories to the press about her after Gardiner made comments about her weight and lack of commitment to the series.
21	ITV launches Week 4 of its "Creates" Ident package in 2019, designed by Patricia Volk.
21	ITV3 starts showing classic episodes of soap opera Emmerdale. The repeats start from November 1989, when it was renamed from Emmerdale Farm to just Emmerdale. The repeats, which sees two episodes broadcast each day, follow two episodes of Classic Coronation Street, which have been airing on the channel since October 2017.
22	The 24th National Television Awards takes place at The O2 Arena in London and is shown on ITV presented by Dermot O'Leary. BBC One's Bodyguard leads the success story of the night by winning Most Popular Drama Series and Best Drama Performance for Richard Madden
23	George Alagiah returns to BBC News at Six following a year out due to cancer treatment.
25	BBC One announces plans to show a documentary about the murder of Jill Dando to coincide with the twentieth anniversary of her death in April 1999. The film will include "previously unseen archive and photographs", as well as contributions from her friends, relatives and colleagues.
25	Olympic gymnast Beth Tweddle launches legal action against the makers of Channel 4's The Jump after fracturing vertebrae while taking part in the programme in 2016.
25	Netflix has commissioned a miniseries of Sarah Pinborough's psychological thriller Behind Her Eyes. Steve Lightfoot is credited as the creator and executive producer of the series.
27	BBC One airs an episode of Call the Midwife featuring a story about a boy born with a cleft lip. The episode wins praise both from viewers and charities for its handling of the storyline.
27	Businesswoman Jenny Campbell is to leave her Dragons' Den role at the end of the present series; she will make her last appearance on 3 February.
27	Media personality and businesswoman, Gemma Collins suffers a fall during her live performance to Celine Dion's "It's All Coming Back to Me Now" on the fourth week of the eleventh series of Dancing on Ice. She falls on her face, nearly breaking her jaw and neck, and injures her knee significantly.
28	ITV launches Week 5 of its "Creates" Ident package in 2019, designed by Mark Titchner.
29	Footage of David Bowie's first television appearance as Ziggy Stardust on an ITV music programme in 1972 has been unearthed. The thought-to-be-lost footage is of Bowie on an edition of Granada Television's Lift Off with Ayesha. It was recorded on a home video recorder and will undergo a restoration process as the film had degraded with time.
30	An annual survey of five- to sixteen-year-olds' viewing habits conducted by Childwise has indicated the US sitcom Friends to be the most popular programme among that age group.
31	ITV pulls the documentary Fred & Rose West: The Real Story with Trevor McDonald shortly before its scheduled transmission due to unspecified legal concerns. ITV says the documentary, which alleges Rose West was as violent and dangerous as her husband Fred, will now air at a later date. The documentary is subsequently rescheduled for 21 February.

=== February ===
Date	Event
1	The government announces that the television licence fee will rise from £150.50 to £154.50 on 1 April.
4	ITV launches Week 6 of its "Creates" Ident package in 2019, designed by Katrina Russell-Adams.
5	BBC Two viewers vote Alan Turing the most iconic figure of the 20th Century following a series that asked the public to name the century's greatest figure.
5	ITV announces it is axing two of its sitcoms – Birds of a Feather and Bad Move.
7	Artists Studio announces it is developing a reboot of the 1980s Jersey-based detective series Bergerac. The project is backed by Endemol Shine UK and Westward Studios.
8	Michael Rice is chosen by viewers of BBC Two's Eurovision: You Decide to represent the United Kingdom at the 2019 Eurovision Song Contest with his anthem "Bigger than Us".
10	The 72nd British Academy Film Awards take place at the Royal Albert Hall in London and are shown on BBC One. Joanna Lumley hosts the awards for a second time. Yorgos Lanthimos's film The Favourite leads the nominations with 12, Bradley Cooper and Alfonso Cuarón break records by receiving multiple nominations in multiple categories with Amy Adams, Olivia Colman and Steve Coogan receiving their seventh BAFTA nominations.
11	ITV launches Week 7 of its "Creates" Ident package in 2019, designed by Kristina Veasey.
11	Channel 4 says it will go ahead with plans to screen the controversial Michael Jackson documentary Leaving Neverland in spite of receiving a request from the singer's estate for it not to be aired. The film, due to air on 6 and 7 March, features two men who claim they were abused by Jackson as children. The Jackson family had asked for the film not to be screened since they had not been given the chance to respond to the allegations.
12	Details of BBC Scotland's flagship news programme, The Nine, are released. The 60-minute programme will air daily from 9.00 pm and has a fifteen-strong team of presenters and reporters. It will be anchored by Rebecca Curran and Martin Geissler.
13	Plans are announced to shorten the Monday to Thursday editions of BBC News at Ten from 45 minutes to 35 minutes from 4 March in order to make way for a new BBC Three strand of programming, and to avoid clashing with the start of BBC Two's Newsnight, which begins at 10.30 pm. The BBC Three strand will run from Mondays to Wednesdays at 10.35 pm, with Question Time continuing to air after the news on Thursdays.
13	Dermot O'Leary announces he is to quit his role as presenter of the National Television Awards after ten years.
13	Professional dancer Pasha Kovalev announces he is leaving Strictly Come Dancing after eight years with the series.
14	The BBC defends its forthcoming CBBC series Living with the Lams amid concerns its characters are racial stereotypes. The group BEATS (British East Asians working in Theatre and Screen) has expressed concerns about the series, about a Chinese family running a restaurant in Manchester, after scripts for it became available, because the series will be written by few British East Asian writers. The BBC says that they do not select writers and producers "based solely on their cultural affiliations or nationality", but that it is "confident" that it will make a show which "successfully reflects and celebrates this community".
14	Graham Norton and Alan Carr are named as judges on RuPaul's Drag Race UK, which is set to debut on BBC Three later in the year.
14	Nickelodeon confirms plans for a new series of Paddington Bear, which will be voiced by Ben Whishaw.
15	BBC One decides not to recommission its late night politics discussion programme This Week after Andrew Neil announced his intention to leave his role as its presenter. The current series is due to end in July, after which it will disappear from the schedules.
17	BBC Two Scotland closes in preparation for the launch of the BBC Scotland channel. Viewers in Scotland can still watch the national version of BBC Two, with regional content aired by BBC Two Scotland being transferred to the new channel.
18	ITV launches Week 8 of its "Creates" Ident package in 2019, designed by James Alec Hardy, marking the end of the first wave of idents.
19	Virgin Media stops providing BBC Four, BBC News, CBBC and CBeebies in standard definition.
20	The 2019 Brit Awards are held at the O2 Arena and are shown on ITV. Comedian Jack Whitehall hosts the awards for a second time. For the first time in Brit Awards history, the nominations are dominated by women, with Jess Glynne, Dua Lipa and Anne-Marie leading the nominations with four nods each.
21	ITV airs Fred & Rose West: The Real Story with Trevor McDonald after it was pulled by them on 31 January, the day before it was originally supposed to air.
23	Ellie Ferguson wins the first series of The Greatest Dancer.
24	A new BBC Scotland channel launches and replaces BBC Two Scotland. Overnight figures indicate it to have had a peak viewership of 700,000, with five of the top ten programmes seen in Scotland being aired by BBC Scotland.
25	BBC Scotland launches its weekday flagship news programme The Nine.
25	ITV launches Week 9 of its "Creates" Ident package in 2019, designed by Alec Stevens, marking the start of the second wave of idents.
27	The BBC and ITV announce they are in the final stages of discussions to set up a UK version of the BritBox streaming service as a rival to Netflix. BritBox is currently available to viewers in the US and Canada, where it provides UK television content to around 500,000 subscribers.
27	Launch of The Debate, BBC Scotland's weekly political debate show.

=== March ===
Date	Event
2	BBC One airs the first of two special Casualty/Holby City crossover episodes featuring a storyline involving characters from both series. The story concerns a cyber attack on Holby City Hospital. Part One of the story appears in the evening's episode of Casualty, with Part Two appearing in the 5 March episode of Holby City.
4	The Monday to Thursday editions of BBC News at Ten are cut from 45 minutes back to 35 minutes. The reduction affects editions of the national and local news bulletins airing in that timeslot, as well as the post-bulletin weather forecast.
4	The BBC confirms its period medical drama Call the Midwife has been recommissioned for a further two series. This is in addition to the previously confirmed series nine due to air in 2020, and means the series will be on air until at least 2022.
4	ITV launches Week 10 of its "Creates" Ident package in 2019, designed by Charley Peters.
4	With Big Brother no longer airing on Channel 5, The Bachelor makes a short-lived return to Channel 5 for the first time since 2012.
6	Sara Cox signs a contract with ITV to present a weekend entertainment show, The Sara Cox Show, that will air on Saturday and Sunday mornings.
6	Channel 4 airs the first part of the documentary Leaving Neverland, in which two men allege they were sexually abused as children by the singer Michael Jackson. The second part is aired on 7 March.
8	A special episode of Emmerdale airs on ITV to mark International Women's Day. The episode, featuring a female-only cast, reveals two secrets including (not previously announced) that character Lisa Dingle is living with a terminal illness and will be killed off. Jane Cox will be leaving the soap after 23 years.
10	James Jordan and dance partner Alexandra Schauman win series eleven of Dancing on Ice.
11	ITV launches Week 11 of its "Creates" Ident package in 2019, designed by Isabel + Helen.
12	BBC One makes some last minute schedule changes in order to show coverage of a crucial House of Commons vote on Brexit, meaning that EastEnders is aired 30 minutes later than usual, and the evening's episode of Holby City is postponed until the following week. Because of this Holby City airs on Tuesday 19 March and Wednesday 20 March instead of the usual single episode scheduled for the Tuesday.
14	ITV have signed up John Torode and Lisa Faulkner to present a weekend cooking show, John And Lisa's Weekend Kitchen on Sunday mornings.
14	Alicia Oates wins the short-lived revival of the Channel 5 reality dating show The Bachelor prior to the show's cancellation announcement in June 2020.
15	BBC One airs the Red Nose Day 2019 telethon, which raises £63m for Comic Relief. The programme includes short sequels to the film Four Weddings and a Funeral and the television series Bodyguard, with actors from both reprising their original roles.
18	ITV launches Week 12 of its "Creates" Ident package in 2019, designed by Bharti Parmar.
20	The BBC is criticised by the Public Accounts Committee over its handling of the redevelopment of the EastEnders set, which is several years behind schedule and will cost several million more than was original estimated.
20	Emily Maitlis is to become the main presenter of BBC Two's Newsnight following the departure of Evan Davis in 2018. BBC Radio 5 Live presenter Emma Barnett will also join the Newsnight presenting team.
21	Radzi Chinyanganya announces he will leave his Blue Peter presenting role after five years with the BBC children's programme.
25	ITV launches Week 13 of its "Creates" Ident package in 2019, designed by Adam Nathaniel Furman.
29	Retired banker Irini Tzortzoglou wins the 2019 series of MasterChef.
29	Following criticism of the ITV reality programme Love Island after the death of Mike Thalassitis, the channel's chief executive, Carolyn McCall, says ITV will change its aftercare procedure for participants so that counsellors stay in touch with them for a longer period than at present.
31	The fifth series of Line of Duty begins airing on BBC One. According to overnight figures the opening episode is watched by 7.8 million viewers, giving it the highest audience of 2019 so far.

=== April ===
Date	Event
1	ITV launches Week 14 of its "Creates" Ident package in 2019, designed by Olly Feathers.
1	Discovery Inc. announces that it will acquire BBC Studios' stakes in Good Food, Home, and Really, while BBC Studios will acquire Discovery's stakes in the seven remaining UKTV networks for £173 million. The sale comes as part of a larger agreement between the two companies for international streaming rights to the BBC's natural history programming.
2	BBC One airs the documentary The Murder of Jill Dando to coincide with the 20th anniversary of the death of Dando. It is watched by four million viewers. The general consensus among critics is that the film is "sensitive" and "powerful" but lacks answers.
2	Former Grange Hill actor Lee MacDonald (who played Zammo McGuire in the series) is to return to television for a cameo role in EastEnders where he will play a bus driver who takes part in a radio contest for gig tickets.
4	The BBC makes an eleventh hour decision to move the venue of the week's edition of Question Time from Bolton in Greater Manchester to Dulwich in London in order to allow parliamentarians scheduled to be panelists to still appear on the programme while taking part in votes concerning Brexit in the House of Commons. The move prompts accusations of bias on social media.
6	Coronation Street is to introduce its first black family, the Baileys, who will arrive in June 2019.
6	Britain's Got Talent returns for its thirteenth series on ITV, with Ant McPartlin returning to his presenting role alongside Declan Donnelly.
6	Molly Hocking wins the eighth series of The Voice UK.
7	Tony and Elaine Teasdale win the first series of BBC Two's Race Across the World.
8	Ofcom launches an investigation into Channel 4 News presenter Jon Snow after comments he made on the 29 March edition of the programme. The regulator says 2,644 people have complained about Snow's remark that he had "never seen so many white people in one place" during a report about a pro-Brexit rally.
8	Phoebe Waller-Bridge's dark comedy drama Fleabag concludes its second and final series on BBC One, receiving exceptional critical acclaim.
8	ITV launches Week 15 of its "Creates" Ident package in 2019, designed by CJ Mahoney.
10	Darcey Bussell announces that she is to step down as a judge from Strictly Come Dancing after seven years on the show.
10	True Vision Productions, a film company that produced a 2017 documentary about stillbirth for Channel 4, is fined £120,000 for unlawfully filming expectant mothers in a maternity unit by installing CCTV-style cameras without adequately informing the patients of their presence.
11	ITV confirms that Shila Iqbal, who plays Aiesha Richards in Emmerdale, has been dismissed from the series over historical offensive tweets she posted in 2014.
12	Robbie Williams confirms that he and his wife Ayda Field will not be judges on the next series of The X Factor.
13	Shellyann Evans wins the second series of All Together Now.
15	The first episode of the final series of Game of Thrones makes its British television debut on Sky Atlantic, where it is watched by an audience of 2.3 million. The episode airs at 2.00 am so as to coincide with its broadcast in the United States.
15	ITV launches Week 16 of its "Creates" Ident package in 2019, designed by Fiona Grady.
18	David Attenborough presents the BBC One documentary Climate Change – The Facts, which explores the science of climate change and possible solutions to counteract it. The film wins general praise from critics for highlighting the dangers that could be presented by not doing enough to tackle climate change.
18	Rylan Clark-Neal will co-present Strictly Come Dancing: It Takes Two alongside Zoe Ball when the series returns later in the year.
22	The University of Edinburgh wins the 2018–19 series of University Challenge, beating St Edmund Hall, Oxford 155–140.
22	ITV launches Week 17 of its "Creates" Ident package in 2019, designed by Laurie Nouchka.
22	Amazon apologises after an error led to the second episode of the final series of Game of Thrones being uploaded to the site before it was scheduled to become available.
23	Entrepreneur Sara Davies joins the panel of Dragons' Den, replacing Jenny Campbell.
23	BBC News reports that Stephen Frears will direct a television adaptation of James Graham's play Quiz which concerns Charles Ingram and the coughing scandal that surrounded his 2001 win of £1,000,000 on Who Wants to Be a Millionaire?.
24	Ellis Hill wins the first series of BBC Three/BBC One series Glow Up: Britain's Next Make-Up Star.
24	Rylan Clark-Neal announces that he is the spokesperson for the United Kingdom vote in the Eurovision Song Contest 2019 in Israel in next month.
25	The House of Lords Committee on Intergenerational Fairness recommends scrapping free television licenses for the over 75s as part of a number of measures to replace age-related benefits with support for the young to "deliver a fairer society".
26	Blue Peter names Richie Driss as its newest presenter, making him the programme's 38th regular presenter.
26	BBC Two airs the debut episode of The Looming Tower, a ten-part dramatisation of non-fiction book of the same name that explores the rising threat of Osama bin Laden and al-Qaeda during the years before 9/11.
29	ITV launches Week 18 of its "Creates" Ident package in 2019, designed by Caroline Wright.

=== May ===
Date	Event
3	BBC Four airs a special one-off edition of the 1960s television programme Jazz 625 live from the Cheltenham Jazz Festival. The programme airs in black-and-white, making it the first live black-and-white television broadcast since the 1970s.
3	Lucy Fallon announces she will leave her role as Coronation Street's Bethany Platt in 2020. Her decision follows similar departure announcements in the preceding few days from Faye Brookes (Kate Connor), Tristan Gemmill (Robert Preston) and Katie McGlynn (Sinead Tinker).
4	Speaking to David Tennant's podcast, US comedian Tina Fey reveals that former British Prime Minister David Cameron once asked her to lobby the British television industry to urge them to make the same number of episodes for series as shows produced in the United States. However, she rejected his request, explaining that US producers were envious of the British format of producing fewer episodes.
5	BBC One airs the 90-minute-finale of the fifth series of Line of Duty, with overnight figures indicating an audience of 9.1 million, giving it the largest audience of 2019 up to this point.
6	ITV launches Week 19 of its "Creates" Ident package in 2019, designed by deaf-artist Rubbena Aurangzeb-Tariq for Deaf Awareness Week.
9	Adrian Edmondson will join the cast of EastEnders as Daniel Cook, a love interest for Jean Slater (played by Gillian Wright).
10	The day's scheduled edition of Have I Got News for You is pulled from BBC One due to the confirmation a few days earlier that UK voting in the 2019 European Parliament election will go ahead, which conflicted with the booking of Change UK MP Heidi Allen as one of the panelists.
12	Graham Norton presents the 2019 British Academy Television Awards after a two-year-break, replacing Sue Perkins. The award for Best Drama Series is awarded to the hit BBC cat-and-mouse thriller, Killing Eve.
13	ITV launches Week 20 of its "Creates" Ident package in 2019, designed by Liz West.
13	ITV indefinitely suspends the filming and broadcast of last ever series of The Jeremy Kyle Show, following the death of a guest with a funeral date confirmed in June.
14	MPs call for ITV to axe The Jeremy Kyle Show following reports the guest who died had been subjected to a lie detector test on an edition of the show recorded a week before his death.
14	Actor Martin Clunes is dropped as a patron of the Born Free Foundation after he was seen riding a captive elephant during an episode of the ITV series My Travels And Other Animals.
15	ITV officially axes The Jeremy Kyle Show after the death of a guest who had appeared on the show. Both Ofcom and the House of Commons Culture, Media and Sport Select Committee subsequently launch investigations into reality television, with a focus on the support offered to participants.
15	Sophie Ellis-Bextor withdraws from the UK's Eurovision Song Contest jury due to "unforeseen circumstances".
17	George Ure replaces Sophie Ellis-Bextor as a member of the UK's Eurovision jury after Ellis-Bextor pulled out of the role.
17	BBC One has commissioned a two-part drama based on the events of the 2018 Salisbury poisoning.
17	Jack Whitehall guest presents the evening's edition of The Graham Norton Show while Graham Norton is in Tel Aviv to commentate on the Eurovision Song Contest.
18	The Eurovision Song Contest 2019 in Tel Aviv, Israel, is won by Duncan Laurence for the Netherlands with his song "Arcade". Michael Rice represented the United Kingdom with his song "Bigger than Us", finishing in 26th and last place. The UK's Eurovision anthem scored 11 points.
19	BBC One airs the documentary Royal Team Talk in which the Duke of Cambridge takes part in a discussion about men's mental health issues with several notable sportsmen, including Thierry Henry, Gareth Southgate and Peter Crouch.
20	ITV launches Week 21 of its "Creates" Ident package in 2019, designed by Gayle Chong Kwan.
22	BBC One airs a special edition of Panorama in which undercover filming documents abuse against patients with learning difficulties and autism at a specialist hospital at Whorlton Hall, County Durham. The programme leads to the hospital's closure, as well as a police investigation into activities at the unit.
24	Jane Cox makes her final appearance as the Emmerdale character Lisa Dingle where she is killed off, having been on screen since 1996.
27	Lucy Benjamin will be returning to EastEnders as Lisa Fowler.
27	ITV launches Week 22 of its "Creates" Ident package in 2019, designed by Florence Mytum.
28	The BBC announce plans to hold televised leadership debates for the candidates in the Conservative Party leadership election. All candidates will be invited to take part in a hustings debate chaired by Emily Maitlis, followed by a Question Time special with Fiona Bruce. The final two candidates will then have a one-to-one interview with Andrew Neil. Sky News also announce plans for a head-to-head leadership debate between the final two candidates in front of an audience of Conservative Party members.
28	The BBC announce that Gavin & Stacey will return for the first time in almost 10 years with an hour-long Christmas special to air on BBC One on Christmas Day. All of the regular cast will reprise their roles.
30	While appearing on the evening's edition of Question Time, the Liberal Democrats deputy leader Jo Swinson confirms that she will put her name forward in the party's forthcoming leadership election.
31	The parents of a police officer affected by the Salisbury poisoning criticise BBC plans for a television drama about the poisoning, saying it is too soon to make a drama about the events.
31	ITV announce plans to produce a UK version of the popular Korean music based game show Masked Singer that will begin in 2020.

=== June ===
Date	Event
2	Colin Thackery, an 89-year-old Chelsea Pensioner and singer, wins Series 13 of Britain's Got Talent. He is the oldest person to win the title.
3	ITV launches Week 23 of its "Creates" Ident package in 2019, designed by Greta Davies.
5	Channel 4 announces plans to broadcast a debate between the Conservative Party leadership candidates on 16 June, hosted by Krishnan Guru-Murthy.
6	The BBC confirms that the first Conservative leadership debate will be broadcast at 8.00 pm on 18 June on BBC One. Our Next Prime Minister will see members of the public in BBC studios around the UK asking the candidates questions live.
6	Channel 4 have recruited celebrity barrister Robert Rinder to present a current affairs programme for the network.
7	Among those from the world of entertainment to be recognised in the 2019 Birthday Honours are Olivia Colman, who becomes a CBE, and Bear Grylls, who becomes an OBE.
10	The BBC announces it will end blanket free television licenses for the over-75s from 2020, affecting around 3.7 million people. From 2020 only households where one occupant receives the Pension Credit benefit will be eligible for a free TV licence.
10	ITV launches Week 24 of its "Creates" Ident package in 2019, designed by Rabiya Choudhry.
11	Discovery Inc. takes full control of Good Food, Home and Really.
11	BBC Studios takes full control of UKTV and of its remaining seven channels.
13	The BBC announces it will bring its award-winning Brexitcast podcast to television, launching on BBC One in September.
14	Boris Johnson, frontrunner in the Conservative leadership election, declines an invitation from Channel 4 to take part in 16 June leaders debate with the five other candidates standing against him, saying he fears the event will be "cacophonous". However, he agrees to participate in the BBC One debate scheduled to be held two days later on 18 June.
16	Soccer Aid for UNICEF 2019 takes place at Chelsea FC's Stamford Bridge stadium, where Piers Morgan's World XI beat Susanna Reid's England squad for a third title.
17	ITV launches Week 25 of its "Creates" Ident package in 2019, designed by Carleen de Sözer.
18	Talk show host Jeremy Kyle is criticized for refusing to appear before a committee of MPs conducting an inquiry into reality TV. The Digital, Culture, Media and Sport (DCMS) Committee launched an investigation following the suicide of a guest shortly after having featured on ITV's The Jeremy Kyle Show in May.
24	ITV launches Week 26 of its "Creates" Ident package in 2019, designed by Keith Sargent and Lindsay Seers.
25	Pensioners stage a protest outside the BBC studios in Belfast and Derry following the BBC's decision to end universal free UK television licenses for those aged 75 and over.
25	Poppy Lee Friar makes her final appearance as the Ackley Bridge character Missy Booth, when she is killed off in a dramatic storyline.
27	Channel 5 announce the filming of a new series of All Creatures Great and Small, which will be shot on location in Yorkshire and begin later in the year.
28	Channel 4 airs the last-ever episode of the revived edition of Fifteen to One, hosted by Sandi Toksvig.

=== July ===
Date	Event
1	ITV launches Week 27 of its "Creates" Ident package in 2019, designed by Yvette Hawkins.
6	The 1,000th edition of Click makes its debut on the BBC News channel.
8	ITV launches Week 28 of its "Creates" Ident package in 2019, designed by Julia Vogl.
9	Julie Etchingham presents Britain's Next Prime Minister: The ITV Debate from MediaCityUK, an hour-long programme in which Boris Johnson and Jeremy Hunt, the two remaining Conservative leadership candidates, go head-to-head before a live audience.
10	The BBC says that an edition of Question Time featuring Boris Johnson and Jeremy Hunt scheduled for Tuesday 16 July is unlikely to go ahead since producers have been unable to reach agreement with the two Conservative Party leadership candidates over the programme's format.
11	Tamzin Outhwaite bows out of her EastEnders role as Mel Owen, and she will depart in the autumn.
12	Theresa May gives her final major interview as prime minister, speaking exclusively to the BBC's Laura Kuenssberg.
12	BBC One airs The Andrew Neil Interviews in which Andrew Neil questions Boris Johnson and Jeremy Hunt about their prospective policies should they become prime minister.
14	Channel 4 shows live coverage of the 2019 Cricket World Cup Final. This is the first time since 2005 that live cricket has been shown on terrestrial television. Sky Sports have the live rights to the tournament but had agreed to make the final available on free-to-air television if England made the final.
15	ITV launches Week 29 of its "Creates" Ident package in 2019, designed by 121.Collective.
15	The BBC's national and regional news programmes are revamped with the Reith font.
18	The world premiere of the fifth series of Peaky Blinders takes place in Birmingham, the city where the BBC drama is set.
18	BBC One broadcasts the final edition of This Week after sixteen years on air. A special live audience edition of the programme marks its finale. The edition finishes with an appearance from Mick Hucknall who serenades presenter Andrew Neil with a rendition of "Nobody Does It Better".
19	The BBC and ITV set out plans for the BritBox subscription service, a joint venture that will deliver streamed content. The service, scheduled to launch between October and December 2019, will cost £5.99 per month and include content from both broadcasters.
19	BBC Two airs a special edition of Politics Live in which presenter Jo Coburn is joined by Ed Davey and Jo Swinson, the two candidates in the 2019 Liberal Democrats leadership election.
19	Karina Canellakis becomes the first woman to conduct the First Night of the Proms.
20	Stephen McDonell, the BBC's China correspondent, is interrupted and heckled while on air by pro-China protesters during a weekend of demonstrations in Hong Kong over a proposed extradition bill allowing people to be sent to China for trial.
22	Motsi Mabuse will replace Darcey Bussell as a judge on the next series of Strictly Come Dancing.
22	ITV launches Week 30 of its "Creates" Ident package in 2019, designed by Emily Downing & Olivia Weston.
24	Nicky Morgan is appointed Secretary of State for Digital, Culture, Media and Sport, replacing Jeremy Wright.
24	Figures released by Ofcom indicate a decline in news consumption on television since 2018, with an increase in people getting news from social media. Television remains the main source of news, but fell from 79% in 2019 to 75%, with social media rising from 45% to 49% over the same period.
26	Ofcom has fined RT UK £200,000 over content in several of its news and current affairs programmes, which it said constituted "a serious breach" of the regulations.
29	ITV launches Week 31 of its "Creates" Ident package in 2019, designed by Brandon Saunders from University of Newcastle.
29	Amber Gill and Greg O'Shea win series five of Love Island.
30	Latin dancer Nancy Xu joins the line-up of professional dancers on Strictly Come Dancing.

=== August ===
Date	Event
1	Ofcom gives BBC iPlayer permission to extend the amount of time it can make broadcast content available from 30 days to a year, meaning BBC programmes will be available for 12 months after their original airdate.
5	Ofcom clears Channel 4 News and Jon Snow over remarks Snow made while reporting on a pro-Brexit rally in March. The regulator received 2,500 complaints after Snow said of the demonstration that he had "never seen so many white people in one place".
5	The Advertising Standards Authority says it will not take action over a complaint from the Royal College of Nursing (RCN) about a commercial for incontinence underwear TENA because the advert has not broken any rules. The RCN had complained to the watchdog that the commercial implied that incontinence is "normal and expected" after childbirth, which the RCN says is inaccurate.
5	ITV launches Week 32 of its "Creates" Ident package in 2019, designed by students at the BA (Hons) Fine Art course at Arts University Bournemouth.
7	Following the success of her one-off special Gemma Collins: Diva España the previous year, media personality and businesswoman Gemma Collins begins starring in her own reality series Gemma Collins: Diva Forever.
9	The BBC announces a year-long "celebration of literature" that will feature a series of programmes fronted by the likes of Richard E. Grant, Mark Gatiss and Helen Fielding.
9	The death is reported of Mexican transgender model Miriam Rivera, who in 2004 starred in the Sky One reality dating series There's Something About Miriam. The show featuring Rivera, who died in February 2019, caused controversy at the time of its broadcast after several of the male contestants took legal action against the programme which concluded with Rivera revealing her transgender status.
12	ITV launches Week 33 of its "Creates" Ident package in 2019, designed by Ash Kayser, who has enrolled at UWE Bristol.
18	BBC One's Songs of Praise shows its first gay wedding, the wedding of Jamie Wallace and Ian McDowall at the Rutherglen United Reformed Church in Glasgow.
19	ITV launches Week 34 of its "Creates" Ident package in 2019, designed by Erin Taylor, a Fine Art student at Manchester Metropolitan University.
23	Channel 4 airs the series finale episode of the popular game show The £100K Drop, formerly known as The Million Pound Drop and the original version of Money Drop franchise, after over seven years and 15 seasons of air. The eventual cancellation is announced on 30 December.
25	Peaky Blinders returns for a fifth series, moving from BBC Two to BBC One.
26	Prime Minister Boris Johnson wades into the debate over free TV licenses for the over-75s, declaring that the BBC should "cough up" and pay for TV licences for all over-75s.
26	ITV launches Week 35 of its "Creates" Ident package in 2019, designed by Emily Forgot.
31	ITV launches a new spin-off series to Britain's Got Talent titled Britain's Got Talent: The Champions with Ant & Dec as hosts and David Walliams, Alesha Dixon, Amanda Holden and Simon Cowell as judges.

=== September ===
Date	Event
2	ITV launches Week 36 of its "Creates" Ident package in 2019, designed by Florence Blanchard.
9	ITV launches Week 37 of its "Creates" Ident package in 2019, designed by Russell Bamber.
11	Emmerdale actor Asan N'Jie (who has played Ellis Chapman since September 2018) has been dismissed from the soap following an incident at the 2019 TV Choice Awards two days earlier.
12	The first televised edition of Brexitcast is aired, debuting firstly on the BBC News Channel at 9.30, before being shown on BBC One at 11.35 pm. The programme is watched by an average one million viewers.
13	Channel 4 announces plans to revive The Great Pottery Throw Down which was axed by BBC Two in 2017 after two series. Melanie Sykes will replace Sara Cox as presenter.
13	Top Boy returns for a third series on Netflix, executively produced by Drake and starring Ashley Walters, Kane Robinson, Micheal Ward and Jasmine Jobson, as well as UK rappers Dave and Little Simz. It is presented as the first series of a Netflix original series, whilst the previous two series, originally broadcast on Channel 4, are known as Top Boy: Summerhouse.
14–15	The first official Peaky Blinders themed festival, The Legitimate Peaky Blinders Festival, is held in Birmingham.
16	ITV launches Week 38 of its "Creates" Ident package in 2019, designed by Louise Bristow.
16	The BBC announces that the BBC Red Button teletext service will be switched off in early 2020.
16	The BBC scraps the public vote to select the UK's Eurovision entrant, and for Eurovision 2020 will team up with record label BMG to select the entry.
20	ITV announces that Richard Madeley and Judy Finnigan will return to This Morning as guest presenters in October, while regular presenters Eamonn Holmes and Ruth Langsford are away.
23	ITV launches Week 39 of its "Creates" Ident package in 2019, designed by Yinka Ilori.
25	The BBC rules that BBC Breakfast presenter Naga Munchetty breached the BBC's guidelines on impartiality when she criticised comments made by US President Donald Trump as perceived racism during an edition of the programme in July. The decision attracts criticism from several public figures, including Lenny Henry and Adrian Lester, who sign an open letter asking the corporation to revisit its ruling against her.
27	Caricaturist Roger Law unveiled plans to relaunch the classic ITV satire series Spitting Image, with a pilot episode having already been recorded. New episodes will feature characters such as US President Donald Trump and the Duke and Duchess of Sussex.
29	Jerusalem is named as Britain's favourite hymn following a vote by viewers of BBC One's Songs of Praise.
30	The BBC reverses its decision to partially uphold a complaint against BBC Breakfast presenter Naga Munchetty over comments she made about Donald Trump.
30	ITV launches Week 40 of its "Creates" Ident package in 2019, designed by Fernando Laposse.

=== October ===
Date	Event
1	Former newsreader Peter Sissons dies of leukemia at the age of 77.
3	BBC One airs episode 6,000 of EastEnders.
3	ITV confirms that the double bill episodes of Coronation Street scheduled for Friday 11 October and Monday 14 October have been scrapped in order to make way for coverage of two Euro 2020 qualifier matches being played by England. Fans of the series subsequently begin an online petition calling on ITV to reverse the decision.
4	Television presenter and campaigner June Sarpong is appointed as the BBC's first director of creative diversity.
4	David Walliams is confirmed as presenter of the 25th National Television Awards, replacing Dermot O'Leary; the event is due to take place in January 2020.
5	Comedy dance duo and Britain's Got Talent Series 4 runner-up, Twist and Pulse, wins the first series of Britain's Got Talent: The Champions.
7	ITV launches Week 41 of its "Creates" Ident package in 2019, designed by Stuart Robinson.
9	The next series of Dancing on Ice will feature a same-sex dancing couple, when Ian "H" Watkins of Steps will be teamed up with professional skater Matt Evers.
13	Sky News Sunrise is broadcast for the final time. The programme, which launched with Sky News first went on air more than 30 years ago, is broadcast. It is replaced the following day with two new shows – The Early Rundown and Sky News @ Breakfast.
14	ITV launches Week 42 of its "Creates" Ident package in 2019, designed by Noëmi Lakmaier.
17	BBC One axes the consumer rights programme Watchdog after 34 years.
18	Channel 4 opens its new national headquarters in Leeds.
18	Paddy Smyth wins the second series of the Channel 4 reality competition show The Circle. Tim Wilson is also voted "viewers champion".
21	Steph McGovern announces she will leave BBC Breakfast to join Channel 4; she will front a daily news and current affairs programme titled The Steph Show from Spring 2020.
21	ITV launches Week 43 of its "Creates" Ident package in 2019, designed by NEON.
24	Channel 4 postpones plans to broadcast Smuggled, a documentary series following eight people attempting to enter the UK by evading border checks following the deaths of 39 people in a refrigerated lorry.
24	Ofcom's annual report into the BBC concludes that it must do more to attract younger audiences to its services.
24	Chef Paul Hollywood apologises after describing a contestant's creation on the semi-final edition of The Great British Bake Off as "diabetes on a plate".
25	The BBC has told Apprentice contestant Lottie Lion that comments she made to a fellow contestant in a WhatsApp group are unacceptable. Lion is alleged to have referred to an Asian contestant as "Gandhi" in a group message sent after filming of the fifteenth series of the reality programme had been completed.
28	ITV launches Week 44 of its "Creates" Ident package in 2019, designed by Kochi Kochi.
29	David Atherton wins the tenth series of The Great British Bake Off.

=== November ===
Date	Event
1	Danny Walters is set to leave EastEnders as Keanu Taylor as his storylines comes to an end. There is a big chance that the character will be killed-off at Christmas.
1	Apple TV launches their new pay streaming service Apple TV+.
3	Johannes Radebe and fellow professional dancer Graziano Di Prima perform a same-sex dance on an edition of Strictly Come Dancing.
4	Jo Swinson, leader of the Liberal Democrats says that her party is seeking legal advice over ITV's decision to exclude them from an election debate.
4	The death is announced of veteran Irish broadcaster Gay Byrne, who presented the Republic of Ireland's The Late Late Show for 37 years, and who early in his career worked for Granada Television and the BBC.
4	ITV launches Week 45 of its "Creates" Ident package in 2019, designed by Jo Taylor.
5	BBC One airs the 1,000th episode of hospital drama Holby City.
6	The Guardian reports that Ofcom has appointed civil servant Melanie Dawes as its chief executive, and successor to outgoing chief executive Sharon White, although Ofcom is still to officially confirm the appointment.
6	Ofcom says it may investigate Sky News breakfast presenter Kay Burley following an instance of "empty chairing" on her programme. Burley spent several minutes conducting an empty chair interview in which she accused Conservative Party chairman James Cleverly of refusing to appear on her programme, then posed questions that she planned to ask him. The incident has generated twenty three official complaints to the watchdog regarding impartiality.
7	The subscription service BritBox is officially launched in the UK, with content from BBC, ITV, Channel 4 and Channel 5.
7	Children in Need chief executive Simon Antrobus criticises a decision by the Official Charts Company to recategorise the charity's 2019 album Got It Covered. The album, which features a selection of actors covering well known songs, was heading for number one in the UK Album Charts but the Official Charts Company has decided to recategorise it as a compilation album.
11	ITV launches Week 46 of its "Creates" Ident package in 2019, designed by Anna Berry.
12	ITV confirms that it has no plans to replace The Jeremy Kyle Show with a specific programme; instead Good Morning Britain and This Morning will each be extended by half an hour to cover the timeslot occupied by the former talk show.
13	The Scottish National Party will take legal action against ITV over the broadcaster's decision to exclude their leader Nicola Sturgeon from a general election debate. ITV plans a head-to-head debate between Conservative leader Boris Johnson and Labour leader Jeremy Corbyn, something Sturgeon has described as "fundamentally unfair" because her party is the third largest in parliament.
14	John Lewis unveils their 2019 Christmas advert, their first joint ad with Waitrose. "Excitable Edgar", filmed in Budapest, features a cover of REO Speedwagon's "Can't Fight This Feeling", performed by Bastille frontman Dan Smith. The ad's creators, adam&eveDDB, say they were struggling to come up with the "perfect ending" until the idea of involving Waitrose led to the Christmas pudding finale. The advert quickly attracts complaints from some parents who claim their children were frightened by Excitable Edgar, the central dragon character in the commercial.
15	BBC One and BBC Two stage the Children in Need 2019 telethon, which raises £47.9m.
16	BBC Two airs a special edition of Newsnight that features a recorded interview between Prince Andrew and Emily Maitlis in which Andrew recounts his friendship with financier and convicted sex offender Jeffrey Epstein. The interview, recorded at Buckingham Palace on 14 November, is the first occasion on which the prince has spoken publicly about his friendship with Epstein.
16	ITV confirms that no live insects will be eaten in series 19 of I'm a Celebrity...Get Me Out of Here!, nor will they be eaten in any future series.
18	The Scottish National Party and Liberal Democrats lose a legal challenge to be included in the ITV leaders' debate to be aired on 19 November.
18	ITV launches Week 47 of its "Creates" Ident package in 2019, designed by Sam Curtis and Dave Bennett.
19	Boris Johnson and Jeremy Corbyn appear on ITV in a head-to-head election debate. The Conservative Party's live Twitter response attracts censure for being branded "factcheckUK".
25	ITV launches Week 48 of its "Creates" Ident package in 2019, designed by Dan Rawlings.
26	Filming for the 20th anniversary episode of Doctors takes place in Birmingham.
29	News of the London Bridge stabbings is broken live on BBC News as one of its reporters, John McManus, is passing by.
30	Megan McKenna is named the winner of ITV's The X Factor: Celebrity.
30	At 7.10 pm, ITV launches early Week 49 of its "Creates" Ident package in 2019, designed by Faith Bebbington.

=== December ===
Date	Event
3	Tilly Keeper leaves the role of EastEnders as Louise Mitchell and will depart in the new year.
3	Ofcom says it will not investigate a complaint from the Conservative Party over a decision by Channel 4 to replace its representative with an ice sculpture during a climate debate aired on 28 November. The channel had refused to accept Michael Gove in place of Boris Johnson for the one-hour debate, and so "empty chaired" Johnson, as well as Brexit Party leader Nigel Farage who had also not attended the debate.
4	Matt Baker announces he will leave The One Show in spring 2020 after nine years with the program, making the announcement on the evening's edition of the show.
4	The Advertising Standards Authority bans a Deliveroo commercial as misleading following 300 complaints from viewers. The ad features a woman handing out food delivery orders from a Deliveroo bag that have been ordered from multiple outlets. The Advertising Standards Authority deems the advert as misleading since it implies a single delivery could include orders from multiple retailers, when in fact individual orders have to be made from each outlet.
6	BBC One airs the final head-to-head debate between Boris Johnson and Jeremy Corbyn before the general election, presented by Nick Robinson.
8	BBC One airs a television adaptation of Emma Healey's novel, Elizabeth Is Missing, a drama featuring Glenda Jackson in her first television acting appearance for 25 years.
8	Jacqueline Jossa wins series 19 of I'm a Celebrity...Get Me Out of Here!.
9	ITV launches Week 50 of its "Creates" Ident package in 2019, designed by Hattie Newman.
11	A software glitch is reported to be preventing the BBC iPlayer service from running on some Samsung Smart TV models, and customers are advised to download a patch to fix the problem. However, the update does not work on some older models, requiring a separate patch that may not be available until early 2020. The BBC estimates the number of TVs affected to be in the low thousands.
12	CBBC announce that they have greenlit the seventh series of Canadian series The Next Step. While the previous six series were acquired from Family and distributed secondhand, the seventh series will be funded directly by CBBC.
12–13	The BBC, ITV and Sky carry coverage of the results of the 2019 general election; the election is won by the Conservative Party with Boris Johnson as Prime Minister. Overnight viewing figures indicate the BBC's coverage, fronted by Huw Edwards (and the first in four decades not to be anchored by David Dimbleby), to have been watched by an average audience of 4.7 million. ITV's coverage, presented by Tom Bradby, has an average audience of 1.4 million, its best since 2005. Sky's coverage, presented by Dermot Murnaghan, has an average of 270,000 viewers for the night, but a peak audience of 2 million.
14	Kelvin Fletcher and professional dance partner Oti Mabuse win the seventeenth series of Strictly Come Dancing. The final is watched by an average of 11.3 million viewers.
15	England cricketer Ben Stokes is named 2019 BBC Sports Personality of the Year.
15	Girl group Real Like You win ITV's The X Factor: The Band.
16	ITV launches Week 51 of its "Creates" Ident package in 2019, designed by Melanie Tomlinson.
17	Caroline Flack stands down as presenter of ITV2's Love Island following an assault charge.
18	Carina Lepore wins the fifteenth series of The Apprentice, beating Scarlett Allen-Horton in the final.
20	Laura Whitmore replaces Caroline Flack as presenter of Love Island.
20	Birmingham chef Stu Deeley wins Series 12 of MasterChef: The Professionals.
24	The BBC announces a unique programme for BBC Four that will coincide with the broadcast of Mary Beard's Shock of the Nude on BBC Two. Life Drawing Live! will be a two-hour programme presented by Josie D'Arby in which life drawing experts will guide a group of artists in how to create a life drawing while viewers will also be encouraged to create their own work.
25	Gavin & Stacey returns to BBC One for a one-off Christmas special a decade after the series' original run. Overnight viewing figures indicate it is watched by an audience of 11.6 million and is the most watched programme on Christmas Day. When catch-up viewers are included in figures released on 2 January 2020 the number rises to 17.1 million, making the episode the most viewed scripted television programme of the 2010s.
26	ITV launches Week 52 of its "Creates" Ident package in 2019, marking the end of the year-long campaign, designed by Anna Lomax.
27	Among those from the world of television to be recognised in the 2020 New Year Honours are Floella Benjamin who becomes a Dame, Nigel Slater who becomes an OBE, and Nadiya Hussain, Ainsley Harriott and Gabby Logan who become MBEs.
28	Brothers Billy and Joe Smith, who appeared in Channel 4's My Big Fat Gypsy Wedding are found dead in a country lane in Kent. An inquest subsequently hears that the two were discovered after a relative found a suicide note.
29	BBC One airs the first episode of its drama The Trial of Christine Keeler, starring Sophie Cookson as Christine Keeler and Ben Miles as John Profumo. Overnight viewing figures indicate it had an average audience of 4.7 million.
30	Following several thousand complaints about poor reception from viewers around the UK, Freeview attributes the problem to high-pressure weather conditions, and urges people experiencing any problems with their reception not to retune their television sets or boxes.
31	BBC One airs Craig David Rocks Big Ben Live to bid farewell to the 2010s and welcome in the new decade.

== Debuts ==
=== BBC ===
Date	Debut	Channel
2 January	The Twinstitute	BBC Two
2 January	Tom Kerridge's Fresh Start	BBC Two
5 January	The Greatest Dancer	BBC One
8 January	Icons: The Greatest Person of the 20th Century	BBC Two
28 January	Inside Europe: 10 Years of Turmoil	BBC Two
12 February	Pitching In	BBC One Wales
15 January	Almost Never	CBBC
17 February	Baptiste	BBC One
24 February	A Night at the Theatre	BBC Scotland
24 February	Getting Hitched Asian Style	BBC Scotland
24 February	Nae Pasaran	BBC Scotland
24 February	The People's News	BBC Scotland
25 February	Born to be Wild	BBC Scotland
25 February	Jamie Genevieve #Unfiltered	BBC Scotland
25 February	Test Drive	BBC Scotland
25 February	The Seven	BBC Scotland
25 February	The Nine	BBC Scotland
25 February	This Time with Alan Partridge	BBC One
25 February	Warren	BBC One
26 February	Real Kashmir FC	BBC Scotland
26 February	The Great Food Guys	BBC Scotland
26 February	The Grey Area	BBC Scotland
27 February	Debate Night	BBC Scotland
27 February	Mini Disco Divas	BBC Scotland
27 February	Rewind 1990s	BBC Scotland
27 February	Scotland's Model Teenager	BBC Scotland
27 February	The Edit	BBC Scotland
28 February	Loop	BBC Scotland
28 February	Next Big Thing	BBC Scotland
28 February	The Racer	BBC Scotland
28 February	TUNE	BBC Scotland
1 March	A View from the Terrace	BBC Scotland
2 March	Rip It Up Unwrapped	BBC Scotland
2 March	Seven Days	BBC Scotland
2 March	Tutti Frutti	BBC Scotland
3 March	Race Across the World	BBC Two
3 March	Inside Central Station	BBC Scotland
5 March	Yes/No: Inside the Indyref	BBC Scotland
6 March	MotherFatherSon	BBC Two
23 March	Catchpoint	BBC One
24 March	Blue Planet Live	BBC One
25 March	Blue Planet UK	BBC One
26 March	The Yorkshire Ripper	BBC Four
1 April	Curiosity	BBC One
2 April	The Murder of Jill Dando	BBC One
4 April	Celebrity Painting Challenge	BBC One
4 April	Jack the Ripper: The Case Reopened	BBC One
8 April	The Victim	BBC One
9 April	Don't Forget the Driver	BBC Two
15 April	Ghosts	BBC One
15 April	Back to Life	BBC One
17 April	Earth from Space	BBC One
18 April	Climate Change – The Facts	BBC One
19 April	Britain's Easter Story	BBC One
22 April	The Customer Is Always Right	BBC One
24 April	Sanjeev Kohli's Big Talk	BBC Scotland
26 April	The Looming Tower	BBC Two
1 May	Last Commanders	CBBC
2 May	Our Dementia Choir with Vicky McClure	BBC One
14 May	Years and Years	BBC One
15 May	Nadiya: Anxiety And Me	BBC One
16 May	David Harewood: Psychosis and Me	BBC Two
19 May	Gentleman Jack	BBC One
19 May	The Ranganation	BBC Two
19 May	What We Do in the Shadows	BBC Two
20 May	Thatcher: A Very British Revolution	BBC Two
21 May	Alastair Campbell: Depression and Me	BBC Two
22 May	Summer of Rockets	BBC Two
22 May	Victorian Sensations	BBC Four
23 May	Big Animal Surgery	BBC Two
25 May	The Hit List	BBC One
26 May	Equator From The Air	BBC Two
28 May	The Warwick University Rape Scandal	BBC Three
28 May	The Planets	BBC Two
29 May	Crisis in Care	BBC One
30 May	Galdem Sugar	BBC iPlayer
2 June	Deadstock: Ultimate Resellers	BBC iPlayer
2 June	England's World Cup Lionesses	BBC One
2 June	The Raft: Storyville	BBC Four
7 June	Pregnant and Platonic	BBC Two
10 June	Ellie and Natasia	BBC Three
10 June	War on Plastic with Hugh and Anita	BBC One
13 June	Who Should Get to Stay in the UK?	BBC Two
17 June	The Family Brain Games	BBC Two
4 July	Serengeti	BBC One
8 July	Dark Money	BBC One
10 July	8 Days: To the Moon and Back	BBC Two
15 July	Nadiya's Time to Eat	BBC Two
17 July	Remarkable Places to Eat	BBC Two
19 July	A Night in With Bros	BBC Four
23 July	Planespotting Live	BBC Four
24 July	Animal Babies: First Year on Earth	BBC Two
30 July	The Chefs' Brigade	BBC Two
14 August	Interior Design Masters	BBC Two
29 August	China: A New World Order	BBC Two
2 September	Rise of the Nazis	BBC Two
3 September	The Capture	BBC One
4 September	The Andrew Neil Show	BBC Two
4 September	The Big Hospital Experiment	BBC Two
4 September	Raiders of the Lost Past with Janina Ramirez	BBC Four
6 September	Scarborough	BBC One
8 September	State of the Union	BBC Two
12 September	Hairy Bikers Route 66	BBC Two
12 September	Brexitcast	BBC One
18 September	Japan with Sue Perkins	BBC One
19 September	The Cameron Years	BBC One
20 September	Inside the Vatican	BBC Two
23 September	Moon and Me	CBeebies
29 September	World on Fire	BBC One
3 October	RuPaul's Drag Race UK	BBC Three
6 October	The Americas with Simon Reeve	BBC Two
7 October	Head Hunters	BBC One
7 October	Escape to the Perfect Town	BBC One
7 October	Handmade in Bolton	BBC Four
12 October	The Wall	BBC One
14 October	Dublin Murders	BBC One
17 October	Giri/Haji	BBC Two
26 October	Great Australian Railway Journeys	BBC Two
27 October	Seven Worlds, One Planet	BBC One
28 October	Gigglequiz	CBeebies
28 October	Who Are You Calling Fat?	BBC Two
30 October	Guilt	BBC Two
31 October	Boy Girl Dog Cat Mouse Cheese	CBBC
3 November	His Dark Materials	BBC One
4 November	For Love or Money	BBC One
5 November	Rick Stein's Secret France	BBC Two
7 November	Inside the Supermarket	BBC One
9 November	Novels That Shaped Our World	BBC Two
11 November	Dom Does America	BBC One
12 November	Gold Digger	BBC One
15 November	Mountain Vets	BBC Two
17 November	The War of the Worlds	BBC One
17 November	Reggie in China	BBC Two
18 November	Vienna Blood	BBC Two
24 November	Ladhood	BBC iPlayer
25 November	The Mallorca Files	BBC One
27 November	The Baby Has Landed	BBC Two
8 December	Elizabeth Is Missing	BBC One
16 December	Responsible Child	BBC Two
22 December	A Christmas Carol	BBC One
23 December	The Goes Wrong Show	BBC One
24 December	The Last Igloo	BBC Four
24 December	Martin's Close	BBC Four
25 December	The Snail and the Whale	BBC One
26 December	Mimi and the Mountain Dragon	BBC One
29 December	The Trial of Christine Keeler	BBC One
29 December	Snow Cats and Me	BBC Two

=== ITV ===
Date	Debut	Channel
6 January	Manhunt	ITV
9 January	Cleaning Up	ITV
28 January	The Stand Up Sketch Show	ITV2
2 February	Small Fortune	ITV
23 February	Out There	ITV
11 March	Cheat	ITV
12 March	Tipping Point: Best Ever Finals	ITV
18 March	Harry's Heroes: The Full English	ITV
20 March	The Bay	ITV
8 April	The Widow	ITV
9 April	Hard to Please OAPS	ITV
13 April	In for a Penny	ITV
18 April	Martin Clunes: My Travels and Other Animals	ITV
19 April	The Comedy Years	ITV3
20 April	The Sara Cox Show	ITV
21 April	Buble!	ITV
23 April	Run for Your Life	ITV
26 April	John Bishop's Ireland	ITV
1 May	Planet Child	ITV
5 May	Tenable All Stars	ITV
6 May	The All New Monty: Who Bares Wins	ITV
7 May	The All New Monty: Ladies' Night	ITV
11 May	Bradley Walsh's Late Night Guestlist	ITV
13 May	Victoria's Palace	ITV
14 May	Bear's Mission With David Walliams	ITV
19 May	What The Durrells Did Next	ITV
20 May	Hatton Garden	ITV
24 May	Hatton Garden: The Inside Story	ITV
3 June	7 Up & Me	ITV
4 June	Her Majesty's Cavalry	ITV
4 June	63 Up (in Up (film series))	ITV
6 June	Shopping with Keith Lemon	ITV2
11 June	Counting Tigers	ITV
12 June	Wild Bill	ITV
13 June	Death Row: Countdown To Execution	ITV
17 June	Hey Tracey!	ITV2
23 June	Trevor McDonald's Indian Train Adventure	ITV
23 June	Beecham House	ITV
2 July	Judi Dench's Wild Borneo Adventure	ITV
25 July	Sewer Men	ITV
27 July	Zone of Champions	ITV
7 August	Speed Freaks	ITV4
14 August	Deep Water	ITV
25 August	Sanditon	ITV
31 August	Britain's Got Talent: The Champions	ITV
2 September	The Rubbish World of Dave Spud	CITV
2 September	A Confession	ITV
2 September	Singletown	ITV2
5 September	Billy Connolly's Great American Adventure	ITV
26 September	Inside Prison: Britain Behind Bars	ITV
8 October	Zomboat!	ITV2
12 October	The X Factor: Celebrity	ITV
24 October	Prince Charles: Inside the Duchy of Cornwall	ITV
27 October	Killer Camp	ITV2
25 November	The Switch	ITV
9 December	The X Factor: The Band	ITV
16 December	Sticks and Stones	ITV

=== Channel 4 ===
Date	Debut	Channel
7 January	Brexit: The Uncivil War	Channel 4
10 January	Flirty Dancing	Channel 4
28 January	The Sex Clinic	E4
30 January	Pure	Channel 4
2 February	Great British Car Journeys	Channel 4
5 February	How the Other Kids Live	Channel 4
11 February	Famous and Fighting Crime	Channel 4
11 February	The Secret Lives of Slim People	Channel 4
17 February	Traitors	Channel 4
26 February	The Hangover Games	E4
5 March	Home	Channel 4
6 March	Leaving Neverland: Michael Jackson & Me	Channel 4
11 March	Baewatch: Parental Guidance	E4
14 March	60 Days on the Streets	Channel 4
20 March	Mums Make Porn	Channel 4
24 March	Secrets of Egypt's Valley of the Kings	Channel 4
28 March	Dead Pixels	E4
30 March	Mission Ignition	Channel 4
1 April	Devon and Cornwall	More4
5 April	Joe Lycett's Got Your Back	Channel 4
5 April	Let's Talk About Sex	Channel 4
8 April	Life After Lock-Up	Channel 4
11 April	Naked Beach	Channel 4
16 April	The Great British School Swap	Channel 4
17 April	Chimerica	Channel 4
2 May	When I Grow Up	Channel 4
15 May	The Virtues	Channel 4
20 May	The Hunt for Jihadi John	Channel 4
23 May	The Secret Life of the Zoo:Underwater Special	Channel 4
27 May	Beat the Chef	Channel 4
27 May	Confessions of a Serial Killer	Channel 4
27 May	A Very British Sex Shop	Channel 4
30 May	The Final Mission:Foxy's War	Channel 4
30 May	Klopp vs Poch: Battle of the Supermanagers	Channel 4
6 June	My Gay Dog and Other Animals	Channel 4
10 June	Year of the Rabbit	Channel 4
25 June	Drag SOS	Channel 4
1 July	Kirstie's Celebrity Craft Masters	Channel 4
10 July	Generation Porn	Channel 4
19 July	The Lateish Show with Mo Gilligan	Channel 4
25 July	The Tez O'Clock Show	Channel 4
5 August	Born Famous	Channel 4
7 August	Jade: The Reality Star Who Changed Britain	Channel 4
8 August	The Secret Teacher	Channel 4
8 August	This Way Up	Channel 4
13 August	Kathy Burke's All Woman	Channel 4
19 August	Call the Cops	Channel 4
30 August	The Rob Rinder Verdict	Channel 4
2 September	Jamie's Meat-Free Meals	Channel 4
5 September	The Dog House	Channel 4
9 September	Cooking Up a Fortune	Channel 4
16 September	Crime and Punishment	Channel 4
29 September	Rob Beckett's Savage Socials	E4
1 October	Snackmasters	Channel 4
7 October	Your Room or Mine?	Channel 4
10 October	Pants on Fire	E4
22 October	The British Tribe Next Door	Channel 4
24 October	The Accident	Channel 4
25 October	Harry Hill's Clubnite	Channel 4
4 November	Smuggled	Channel 4
27 November	My Grandparents' War	Channel 4
24 December	The Tiger Who Came to Tea	Channel 4
25 December	Kylie's Secret Night	Channel 4

=== Channel 5 ===
Date	Debut	Channel
9 January	Red Arrows: Kings of the Sky	Channel 5
5 February	Stalked: Murder in Slow Motion	Channel 5
7 February	Ryanair: Britain's Best Hated Airline	Channel 5
8 February	Secret Scotland	Channel 5
25 February	Around The World By Train With Tony Robinson	Channel 5
5 March	London: 2000 Years of History	Channel 5
13 March	Critical Condition	Channel 5
1 April	Celebs on the Ranch	5Star
8 April	World's Busiest Train Stations	Channel 5
14 April	Titanic: Draining The Wreck	Channel 5
18 April	Clink	5Star
13 May	15 Days	Channel 5
21 May	The Murder of Charlene Downes	Channel 5
27 May	The Blitz: Britain on Fire	Channel 5
29 May	When Plastic Surgery Goes Horribly Wrong	Channel 5
30 May	Hitler's U-Boat: Draining the Ocean	Channel 5
30 May	40 Stone and Too Fat to Move	Channel 5
31 May	The Oath	My5
31 May	The Pompeii Prophecy: Countdown to Devastation	Channel 5
5 June	Casualty 24/7	Channel 5
5 June	Age Gap Love	Channel 5
16 June	21.co.uk	Channel 5
2 July	The Great Gardening Challenge	Channel 5
1 August	Portillo: The Trouble with the Tories	Channel 5
8 August	Vegas 24/7	Channel 5
23 August	Most Expensive Cruise Ships	Channel 5
5 September	British Airways 24/7: Access All Areas	Channel 5
9 September	Undercover Twins	5Star
3 October	Wonderful World of Crafting	Channel 5
25 October	World's Most Scenic Railway Journeys	Channel 5
18 November	Cold Call	Channel 5
28 November	Can You Really Afford to Retire	Channel 5
4 December	Britain's Great Pension Crisis	Channel 5
26 December	Susan Hill's Ghost Story	Channel 5

=== Other channels ===
Date	Debut	Channel
11 January	Sex Education	Netflix
25 January	Rob and Romesh Vs	Sky One
31 January	Ed Stafford: First Man Out	Discovery
6 February	Hypothetical	Dave
16 February	Hala al Turk Show	MBC 4
21 February	Flack	W
22 February	Curfew	Sky One
25 February	London Kills	Acorn TV
7 March	Al Murray's Great British Pub Quiz	Quest
8 March	After Life	Netflix
8 March	Formula 1: Drive to Survive	Netflix
15 March	Turn Up Charlie	Netflix
18 March	101 Dalmatian Street	Disney Channel
5 April	Our Planet	Netflix
8 April	Queens of Mystery	Acorn TV
19 April	Moominvalley	Sky One
21 April	Jesus: His Life	History
2 May	There's Something About Movies	Sky One
3 May	Flinch	Netflix
7 May	Chernobyl	Sky Atlantic
15 May	Sliced	Dave
15 May	Comedy Central Live	Comedy Central
16 May	My Dad Wrote a Porno	Sky Atlantic
21 May	Wanda Sykes: Not Normal	Netflix
21 May	Inside the Operating Theatre	W
24 May	What If	Netflix
24 May	The Perfection	Netflix
26 May	Britain's Greatest Comedian	Gold
27 May	Game of Thrones: The Last Watch	Sky Atlantic
29 May	Black Monday	Sky Atlantic
31 May	When They See Us	Netflix
31 May	Killer Ratings	Netflix
31 May	Good Omens	Amazon Prime Video
4 June	Jonas Brothers: Chasing Happiness	Amazon Prime Video
5 June	Laurence of Suburbia	Amazon Prime Video
7 June	Armistead Maupin's Tales of the City	Netflix
7 June	I Am Mother	Netflix
26 June	Emily Atack: Adulting	W
6 July	Amphibia	Disney Channel
22 August	Brassic	Sky One
29 August	Train Truckers	Yesterday
4 September	Stacey Dooley Sleeps Over	W
13 September	Temple	Sky One
20 September	Criminal: United Kingdom	Netflix
26 September	Frayed	Sky One
3 October	Catherine the Great	Sky Atlantic
7 October	Spy Wars	History
14 October	The Early Rundown	Sky News
14 October	Sky News @ Breakfast	Sky News
21 October	Dave Gorman: Terms and Conditions Apply	Dave
24 October	The London Show	Dubai TV / Dubai One
8 November	Trust Morecambe & Wise	Gold
12 November	The Cockfields	Gold
28 November	Upright	Sky Atlantic
9 December	Traces	Alibi
24 December	Cinderella: After Ever After	Sky One

== Channels and streaming services ==
=== New channels ===
Date	Channel
24 February	BBC Scotland
10 September
10 September	Sony Channel
10 September	Sony Channel +1
10 September	Sony Movies Action
10 September	Sony Movies Action +1
10 September	Sony Movies Classic
10 September	Sony Movies Classic +1
16 September	Drama +1
1 October	Sky Crime
27 December	Now 70s

=== New streaming services ===
Date	Channel
1 November	Apple TV+
7 November	Britbox

=== Defunct channels ===
Date	Channel
12 February	TruTV
17 February	BBC Two Scotland
7 March	Lifetime +1
1 July	True Crime
10 September	True Entertainment
10 September	True Entertainment +1
10 September	Movies4Men
10 September	Movies4Men +1
10 September	True Movies
10 September	True Movies +1
12 September	Good Food
16 September	Travel Channel +1
27 September	YourTV
30 September	Real Lives
20 November	Total Country
30 December	Sewing Quarter

=== Rebranding channels ===
Date	Old Name	New Name
1 August	Turner Classic Movies	TCM Movies
10 September	Sony Movie Channel	Sony Movies
10 September	Sony Movie Channel +1	Sony Movies +1
1 November	Chart Show TV	Trace Urban
1 November	The Vault	Trace Vault
1 November	Chart Show Hits	Trace Latina
20 November	Now 90s	Now Christmas
20 November	Total Country	Now 80s
27 December	Now Christmas	Now 80s
27 December	Now 80s	Now 70s

== Television programmes ==
=== Changes of network affiliation ===
Programme	Moved from	Moved to
Classic Emmerdale	Plus	ITV3
The Expanse	Netflix	Amazon Prime
Cheers	ITV4	Channel 4
Blue Bloods	Sky Atlantic	Sky Witness
Law & Order: Special Victims Unit	Universal TV	Sky Witness
Lucifer	Amazon Prime	Netflix
Rick and Morty (First run rights)	Fox, Netflix, Comedy Central	E4
The Dog Rescuers	Channel 5	5Select
The Repair Shop	BBC Two	BBC One

=== Returning this year after a break of one year or longer ===
Programme	Date(s) of original removal	Original channel(s)	Date of return	New channel(s)
Blockbusters	1993; 1995; 1997; 2001; 2012	ITV, Sky1, BBC Two, Challenge	21 March 2019	Comedy Central
Luther	22 December 2015	BBC One	1 January 2019	N/A (same channel as original)
Celebrity Coach Trip	27 January 2012	Channel 4	14 January 2019	E4
Classic Emmerdale	1 November 2004	Plus	21 January 2019	ITV3
The Great British Sewing Bee	4 July 2016	BBC Two	12 February 2019	N/A (same channel as original)
Shipwrecked	19 December 2001; 10 May 2009; 31 January 2012	Channel 4 E4	28 January 2019	N/A (same channel as original)
Class Dismissed	11 December 2017	CBBC	11 March 2019	N/A (same channel as original)
Line of Duty	30 April 2017	BBC One	31 March 2019	N/A (same channel as original)
Supermarket Sweep	6 September 2001; 31 August 2007	ITV	9 September 2019	ITV2
Top Boy	10 September 2013	Channel 4	13 September 2019	Netflix
The Demon Headmaster	22 January 1998	CBBC	14 October 2019	N/A (same channel as original)
Timmy Time	13 July 2012	CBeebies	21 October 2019	N/A (same channel as original)
Bing	20 May 2015	CBeebies	31 October 2019	N/A (same channel as original)
Cash Trapped	1 September 2017	ITV	11 November 2019	N/A (same channel as original)
Gavin & Stacey	1 January 2010	BBC Three; BBC One	25 December 2019	N/A (same channel as original)
Worzel Gummidge	12 December 1981; 16 April 1989	ITV; Channel 4	26 December 2019	BBC One

== Continuing television programmes ==
=== 1920s ===
Programme	Date
BBC Wimbledon	1927–1939, 1946–2019, 2021–present

=== 1930s ===
Programme	Date
Trooping the Colour	1937–1939, 1946–2019, 2023–present
The Boat Race	(1938–1939, 1946–2019, 2021–present)

=== 1950s ===
Programme	Date
Panorama	(1953–present)
Eurovision Song Contest	(1956–2019, 2021–present)
The Sky at Night	(1957–present)
Final Score	(1958–present) (part of Grandstand 1958–2001)
Blue Peter	(1958–present)

=== 1960s ===
Programme	Date
Coronation Street	(1960–present)
Maigret	(1960–1963, 1992–1993, 2016–present)
Points of View	(1961–present)
Songs of Praise	(1961–present)
University Challenge	(1962–1987, 1994–present)
Doctor Who	(1963–1989, 1996, 2005–present)
Horizon	(1964–present)
Match of the Day	(1964–present)
Top of the Pops	(1964–present) (only at Christmas 2006–present)
Gardeners' World	(1968–present)
A Question of Sport	(1968, 1970–present)

=== 1970s ===
Programme	Date
Emmerdale	(1972–present)
Mastermind (including Celebrity Mastermind)	(1972–1997, 2003–present)
Newsround	(1972–present)
Football Focus	(1974–present)
Arena	(1975–present)
One Man and His Dog	(1976–present)
Top Gear	(1977–present)
Ski Sunday	(1978–present)
Antiques Roadshow	(1979–present)
Question Time	(1979–present)

=== 1980s ===
Programme	Date
Children in Need	(1980–present)
Countdown	(1982–present)
ITV Breakfast	(1983–present)
Thomas & Friends	(1984–present)
EastEnders	(1985–present)
Watchdog	(1985–present)
Comic Relief	(1985–present)
Catchphrase	(1986–2002, 2013–present)
Casualty	(1986–present)
Fifteen to One	(1988–2003, 2013–present)
Red Dwarf	(1988–1999, 2009, 2012–present)
This Morning	(1988–present)
Countryfile	(1988–present)

=== 1990s ===
Programme	Date
The Crystal Maze	(1990–1995, 2016–present)
Have I Got News for You	(1990–present)
MasterChef	(1990–2001, 2005–present)
ITV News Meridian	(1993–present)
Junior MasterChef	(1994–1999, 2010–present)
Top of the Pops 2	(1994–present)
Hollyoaks	(1995–present)
Soccer AM	(1995–present)
Silent Witness	(1996–present)
Midsomer Murders	(1997–present)
Teletubbies	(1997–2002, 2007–2009, 2012, 2015–present)
Y Clwb Rygbi	(1997–present)
Cold Feet	(1998–2003, 2016–present)
Classic Emmerdale	(1998–2004, 2019–present)
Who Wants to Be a Millionaire?	(1998–2014, 2018–present)
British Soap Awards	1999–2019, 2022–present
Holby City	(1999–2022)
Loose Women	(1999–present)

=== 2000s ===
Programme	Date
2000
Bargain Hunt	(2000–present)
BBC Breakfast	(2000–present)
Click	(2000–present)
Doctors	(2000–present)
A Place in the Sun	(2000–present)
The Unforgettable	(2000–2002, 2010–present)
Unreported World	(2000–present)
2001
BBC South East Today	(2001–present)
Rogue Traders	(2001–present) (part of Watchdog 2009–present)
2002
Escape to the Country	(2002–present)
Flog It!	(2002–present)
I'm a Celebrity...Get Me Out of Here!	(2002–present)
Inside Out	(2002–present)
Most Haunted	(2002–2010, 2014–present)
River City	(2002–2026)
Saturday Kitchen	(2002–present)
Still Game	(2002–2019)
2003
QI	(2003–present)
This Week	(2003–present)
Eggheads	(2003–present)
Extraordinary People	(2003–present)
Homes Under the Hammer	(2003–present)
Traffic Cops	(2003–present)
2004	(2003–present)
Doc Martin	(2004–present)
Match of the Day 2	(2004–present)
Strictly Come Dancing	(2004–present)
The Big Fat Quiz of the Year	(2004–present)
The Culture Show	(2004–present)
Football First	(2004–present)
The Gadget Show	(2004–present)
Live at the Apollo	(2004–present)
NewsWatch	(2004–present)
SadlerVision	(2004–present)
Strictly Come Dancing: It Takes Two	(2004–present)
Who Do You Think You Are?	(2004–present)
2005
8 Out of 10 Cats	(2005–present)
Coach Trip	(2005–2006, 2009–2012, 2013–present)
The Andrew Marr Show	(2005–present)
The Adventure Show	(2005–present)
The Apprentice	(2005–present)
Dragons' Den	(2005–present)
The Hotel Inspector	(2005–present)
The Jeremy Kyle Show	(2005–2019)
Mock the Week	(2005–present)
Pocoyo	(2005–present)
Springwatch	(2005–present)
SuperCasino	(2005–2019)
2006
The Album Chart Show	(2006–present)
Animal Spies!	(2006–present)
The Apprentice: You're Fired!	(2006–present)
Banged Up Abroad	(2006–present)
Cricket AM	(2006–present)
Dancing on Ice	(2006–2014, 2018–present)
Dickinson's Real Deal	(2006–present)
Don't Get Done, Get Dom	(2006–present)
Horrid Henry	(2006–present)
Monkey Life	(2006–present)
Not Going Out	(2006–present)
The One Show	(2006–present)
People & Power	(2006–present)
Peschardt's People	(2006–present)
The Secret Millionaire	(2006–2008, 2010–present)
2007
Britain's Got Talent	(2007–present)
Would I Lie to You?	(2007–present)
Benidorm	(2007–present)
The Big Questions	(2007–present)
Don't Tell the Bride	(2007–present)
The Graham Norton Show	(2007–present)
Heir Hunters	(2007–present)
Helicopter Heroes	(2007–present)
London Ink	(2007–present)
Shaun the Sheep	(2007–present)
Real Rescues	(2007–present)
The Hot Desk	(2007–present)
2008
An Là	(2008–present)
Big & Small	(2008–present)
Celebrity Juice	(2008–present)
Chuggington	(2008–present)
Only Connect	(2008–present)
Put Your Money Where Your Mouth Is	(2008–present)
Police Interceptors	(2008–present)
Rubbernecker	(2008–present)
Seachd Là	(2008–present)
2009
Pointless	(2009–present)
The Chase	(2009–present)
Alan Carr: Chatty Man	(2009–present)
Countrywise	(2009–present)
Cowboy Trap	(2009–present)
Piers Morgan's Life Stories	(2009–present)
Rip Off Britain	(2009–present)

=== 2010s ===
Programme	Date
2010
Dinner Date	(2010–present)
The Great British Bake Off	(2010–present)
Great British Railway Journeys	(2010–present)
A League of Their Own	(2010–present)
Little Crackers	(2010–present)
Lorraine	(2010–present)
Luther	(2010–present)
The Only Way Is Essex	(2010–present)
Sherlock	(2010–present)
Sunday Morning Live	(2010–present)
Take Me Out	(2010–2020)
2011
Top Boy	(2011–2013, 2019–present)
All Over the Place	(2011–present)
The Amazing World of Gumball	(2011–present)
Black Mirror	(2011–present)
Four Rooms	(2011–present)
Junior Bake Off	(2011–present)
Made in Chelsea	(2011–present)
Match of the Day Kickabout	(2011–present)
Sam & Mark's Big Friday Wind-Up	(2011–present)
Show Me What You're Made Of	(2011–present)
Vera	(2011–2025)
2012
4 O'Clock Club	(2012–present)
Endeavour	(2012–present)
Call the Midwife	(2012–present)
Great Continental Railway Journeys	(2012–present)
Stand Up To Cancer	(2012–present)
The Voice UK	(2012–present)
Tipping Point	(2012–present)
Naomi's Nightmares of Nature	(2012–present)
Paul O'Grady: For the Love of Dogs	(2012–2023)
Operation Ouch!	(2012–present)
Claimed and Shamed	(2012–present)
2013
The Dumping Ground	(2013–present)
Absolute Genius with Dick and Dom	(2013–present)
Caught Red Handed	(2013–present)
Officially Amazing	(2013–present)
Shetland	(2013–present)
The Dog Rescuers	(2013–present)
Still Open All Hours	(2013–present)
Two Doors Down	(2013, 2016–present)
2014
Agatha Raisin	(2014–present)
Boomers	(2014–present)
The Dog Ate My Homework	(2014–present)
The Jump	(2014–present)
The Great Interior Design Challenge	(2014–present)
The Great British Bake Off: An Extra Slice	(2014–present)
Happy Valley	(2014–present)
Holiday of My Lifetime	(2014, 2016–present)
In the Club	(2014–present)
Chasing Shadows	(2014–present)
The Next Step	(2014–present)
Judge Rinder	(2014–present)
Grantchester	(2014–present)
Paul O'Grady's Animal Orphans	(2014–present)
Weekend Escapes with Warwick Davis	(2014–present)
Scrambled!	(2014–present)
Who's Doing the Dishes?	(2014–present)
24 Hours in Police Custody	(2014–present)
GPs: Behind Closed Doors	(2014–present)
2015
The Almost Impossible Gameshow	(2015–present)
The Dengineers	(2015–present)
Doctor Foster	(2015–present)
Eat Well for Less?	(2015–present)
Hetty Feather	(2015–2020)
The Last Kingdom	(2015–2022)
Hunted	(2015–present)
The Kyle Files	(2015–present)
Michael McIntyre's Big Show	(2015–present)
Ninja Warrior UK	(2015–present)
Nightmare Tenants, Slum Landlords	(2015–present)
Poldark	(2015–present)
Real Stories with Ranvir Singh	(2015–present)
SAS: Who Dares Wins	(2015–present)
The Saturday Show	(2015–present)
Taskmaster	(2015–present)
Thunderbirds Are Go	(2015–2020)
Victoria Derbyshire	(2015–2020)
Wild & Weird	(2015–present)
10,000 BC	(2015–present)
2016
The A Word	(2016–present)
All Over the Workplace	(2016–present)
Bake Off: The Professionals	(2016–present)
Borderline	(2016–present)
Cash Trapped	(2016–2017, 2019–present)
Celebs Go Dating	(2016–present)
Class Dismissed	(2016–2017, 2019–present)
The Crown	(2016–present)
The Cruise	(2016–present)
Got What It Takes?	(2016–present)
Insert Name Here	(2016–present)
The Level	(2016–present)
Marcella	(2016–present)
Masterpiece	(2016–present)
Mum	(2016–present)
Naked Attraction	(2016–present)
No Such Thing as the News	(2016–present)
The Premier League Show	(2016–present)
Spot Bots	(2016–present)
Tenable	(2016–present)
This Time Next Year	(2016–present)
Top Class	(2016–present)
Tribes, Predators & Me	(2016–present)
Unspun with Matt Forde	(2016–present)
Upstart Crow	(2016–present)
Victoria	(2016–present)
The Windsors	(2016–present)
2017
Ackley Bridge	(2017–present)
All Round to Mrs. Brown's	(2017–present)
Back	(2017–present)
Bancroft	(2017–present)
Beyond 100 Days	(2017–present)
This Country	(2017–2020)
Electric Dreams
The End of the F***ing World	(2017–2019)
Free Rein	(2017–2019)
The Good Karma Hospital	(2017–present)
The Voice Kids	(2017–present)
Impossible	(2017–present)
Jamestown	(2017–2019)
Keeping Faith	(2017–present)
Liar	(2017–2020)
Love Island: Aftersun	(2017–present)
The Mash Report	(2017–2020)
Numberblocks	(2017–2019)
The Playlist	(2017–present)
Remotely Funny	(2017–present)
The Repair Shop	(2017–present)
Riviera	(2017–present)
Strike	(2017–present)
Taboo	(2017–present)
Trust Me	(2017–2019)
White Gold	(2017–2019)
Harry Hill's Alien Fun Capsule	(2017–2019)
2018
Britannia	(2018–present)
Bulletproof	(2018–present)
Celebs on the Farm	(2018–present)
The Circle	(2018–present)
Defending the Guilty	(2018–present)
Derry Girls	(2018–present)
A Discovery of Witches	(2018–present)
Gemma Collins: Diva	(2018–present)
I'll Get This	(2018–present)
Killing Eve	(2018–present)
Mark Kermode's Secrets of Cinema	(2018–present)
McMafia	(2018–present)
Peston	(2018–present)
The Real Football Fan Show	(2018–present)
Shakespeare & Hathaway: Private Investigators	(2018–present)
The Split	(2018–present)
Stath Lets Flats	(2018–present)
There She Goes	(2018–present)

== Ending this year ==
Date(s)	Programme	Channel(s)	Debut(s)
1 January	SuperCasino	Channel 5	2005
13 January	Cities: Nature's New Wild	BBC Two	2018
3 February	Les Misérables	BBC One	2018
7 February	Ryanair: Britain's Best Hated Airline	Channel 5	2019
11 February	Inside Europe	BBC Two	2019
13 February	Red Arrows: Kings of the Sky	Channel 5	2019
13 February	Cleaning Up	ITV	2019
19 February	Stalked: Murder in Slow Motion	Channel 5	2019
14 March	Cheat	ITV	2019
19 March	Harry's Heroes: The Full English	ITV	2019
22 March	Flog It!	BBC Two	2002
28 March	Still Game	BBC Scotland	2002
1 April	Warren	BBC One	2019
8 April	Fleabag	BBC One	2016
11 April	The Victim	BBC One	2019
13 April	All Together Now	BBC One	2018
24 April	MotherFatherSon	BBC Two	2019
30 April	The Widow	ITV	2019
7 May	Trust Me	BBC One	2017
8 May	Chimerica	Channel 4	2019
9 May	The Premier League Show	BBC Two	2016
10 May	The Jeremy Kyle Show	ITV	2005
12 May	The Durrells	ITV	2016
12 May	Victoria (British TV series)	ITV	2016
12 May	What Would Your Kid Do	ITV	2018
18 May	Eurovision Song Contest	BBC One	1956
21 May	Horrid Henry	CITV	2006
23 May	Hatton Garden	ITV	2019
4 June	Chernobyl	Sky Atlantic	2019
5 June	The Virtues	Channel 4	2019
14 June	Jamestown	Sky One	2017
15 June	Trooping the Colour	BBC One; BBC Two	1937 & 1946
16 June	Blind Date	ITV & Channel 5	1985 & 2017
18 June	Years and Years	BBC One	2019
19 June	Mum	BBC Two	2016
25 June	The Planets	BBC Two	2019
26 June	Summer of Rockets	BBC Two	2019
30 June	Trevor McDonald's Indian Train Adventure	ITV	2019
1 July	Jackpot 247	ITV	2011
6 July	Free Rein	Netflix	2017
9 July	Judi Dench's Wild Borneo Adventure	ITV	2019
14 July	BBC Wimbledon	BBC One; BBC Two	1927 & 1946
16 July	Dark Mon£y	BBC One	2019
17 July	Wild Bill	ITV	2019
18 July	This Week	BBC One	2003
20 July	Harry Hill's Alien Fun Capsule	ITV	2017
25 July	Planespotting Live	BBC Four	2019
7 August	Animal Babies: First Year on Earth	BBC Two	2019
8 August	Portillo: The Trouble with the Tories	Channel 5	2019
26 August	Poldark	BBC One	2015
12 September	China: A New World Order	BBC Two	2019
16 September	Rise of the Nazis	BBC Two	2019
19 September	Billy Connolly's Great American Adventure	ITV	2019
25 September	Japan with Sue Perkins	BBC One	2019
6 October	State of the Union	BBC Two	2019
7 October	A Confession	ITV	2019
11 October	Scarborough	BBC One	2019
13 October	Sunrise	Sky News	1989
17 October	Inside Prison: Britain Behind Bars	ITV	2019
21 October	Jamie's Meat-Free Meals	Channel 4	2019
24 October	Catherine the Great	Sky Atlantic	2019
1 November	GMT	BBC World News	2010
10 November	The Americas with Simon Reeve	BBC Two	2019
14 November	The Accident	Channel 4	2019
20 November	Guilt	BBC Two	2019
21 November	Cold Call	Channel 5	2019
1 December	The War of the Worlds	BBC One	2019
1 December	Reggie in China	BBC Two	2019
2 December	Vienna Blood	BBC Two	2019
8 December	Seven Worlds, One Planet	BBC One	2019
15 December	The X Factor: The Band	ITV	2019
17 December	Gold Digger	BBC One	2019
18 December	Sticks and Stones	ITV	2019
20 December	Cash Trapped	ITV	2019
23 December	Still Open All Hours (Note: Another series was commissioned, but was delayed by the COVID-19 pandemic and eventually cancelled in 2023)	BBC One	2013
24 December	A Christmas Carol	BBC One	2019
28 December	Take Me Out	ITV	2010
Undated	The British Soap Awards	ITV	1999

== Deaths ==
Date	Name	Age	Broadcast credibility
6 January	W. Morgan Sheppard	86	Actor (Max Headroom, Biker Mice from Mars, Star Trek, Doctor Who)
10 January	Dianne Oxberry	51	Radio and television presenter (BBC Radio 1, North West Tonight)
14 January	Del Henney	83	Actor (When Eight Bells Toll, Straw Dogs, Brannigan)
17 January	Windsor Davies	88	Actor (It Ain't Half Hot Mum, Carry On England, Never the Twain)
18 January	Sylvia Kay	82	Actress (Rapture, Wake in Fright, Just Good Friends)
19 January	Muriel Pavlow	97	Actress (Malta Story, Doctor in the House, Reach for the Sky)
1 February	Jeremy Hardy	57	Comedian (The News Quiz, I'm Sorry I Haven't a Clue, Jeremy Hardy Speaks to the Nation)
1 February	Clive Swift	82	Actor (The National Health, Keeping Up Appearances, The Old Guys, Doctor Who, BT ad campaign)
2 February	William Davis	85	Journalist and broadcaster (BBC)
5 February	Peter Hughes	96	Actor (The Great Muppet Caper, Hope and Glory, Evita)
7 February	Albert Finney	82	Actor (Saturday Night and Sunday Morning, Tom Jones, Murder on the Orient Express)
21 February	Edward Enfield	89	Television and radio presenter (Watchdog) and journalist
24 February	Patricia Garwood	78	Actress (The Lavender Hill Mob, Petticoat Pirates, No Place Like Home)
4 March	Michael Thomas	66	Actor (Life Without George, The Boat That Rocked, Head Over Heels)
6 March	Magenta Devine	61	Television presenter (Rough Guide, Network 7) and journalist
14 March	Pat Laffan	79	Actor (Father Ted, The Snapper)
15 March	Mike Thalassitis	26	Footballer and reality television show contestant (Love Island)
19 March	Clinton Greyn	85	Actor (Compact, Goodbye, Mr. Chips, Doctor Who)
24 March	Julia Lockwood	77	Actress (My Teenage Daughter, Please Turn Over, No Kidding)
29 March	Shane Rimmer	89	Actor (Thunderbirds, Dr. Strangelove, The Spy Who Loved Me)
30 March	Tania Mallet	77	Actress (Goldfinger)
5 April	John Quarmby	89	Actor (Fawlty Towers, K-9 and Company, A Christmas Carol)
6 April	Nadja Regin	87	Actress (From Russia With Love, Goldfinger, Runaway)
7 April	Mya-Lecia Naylor	16	Actress and model (Millie Inbetween, Almost Never)
7 April	Sandy Ratcliff	70	Actress (EastEnders)
8 April	Rex Garrod	75	Roboteer (Brum, Robot Wars) and television presenter (The Secret Life of Machines)
12 April	John McEnery	75	Actor (Romeo and Juliet, Nicholas and Alexandra, The Land That Time Forgot)
15 April	Martin King	86	Voice actor (Captain Scarlet and the Mysterons, Joe 90) and continuity announcer
23 April	Edward Kelsey	88	Actor (Danger Mouse, Wallace & Gromit: The Curse of the Were-Rabbit, Doctor Who)
29 April	John Llewellyn Moxey	94	Film and television director (The City of the Dead, Foxhole in Cairo, Circus of Fear)
30 April	Peter Mayhew	74	Actor (Star Wars, Sinbad and the Eye of the Tiger, Terror)
3 May	Irene Sutcliffe	94	Actress (Coronation Street)
9 May	Freddie Starr	76	Comedian
9 May	Brian Walden	86	Broadcaster and former Labour Party MP (presenter of Weekend World)
11 May	Nan Winton	93	News presenter (first female newsreader on BBC)
20 May	Andrew Hall	65	Actor (Butterflies, Casualty, Coronation Street, EastEnders)
21 May	Royce Mills	77	Actor (Up Pompeii, Up the Chastity Belt, Doctor Who)
26 May	Stephen Thorne	84	Actor (Z-Cars, Crossroads, Doctor Who)
1 June	John Myers	60	Radio executive and presenter, continuity announcer for Border Television
3 June	Paul Darrow	78	Actor (Blake's 7, Doctor Who)
10 June	Peter Whitehead	82	Writer and filmmaker (Wholly Communion, Charlie Is My Darling, Tonite Let's All Make Love in London)
15 June	Jane Hayward	69	Actress
21 June	William Simons	78	Actor (Heartbeat, Crown Court, Where No Vultures Fly) aka Alf Ventress
25 June	Bryan Marshall	81	Actor (The Spy Who Loved Me, Quatermass and the Pit, The Long Good Friday)
26 June	Douglas Fielding	73	Actor (Z-Cars, EastEnders)
30 June	Glyn Houston	93	Actor (Doctor Who, Keep It in the Family)
5 July	John McCririck	79	Horse racing pundit (ITV Racing, Channel 4 Racing)
9 July	Freddie Jones	91	Actor (Emmerdale, The Elephant Man, The Ghosts of Motley Hall) aka Sandy Thomas
10 July	Albert Shepherd	82	Actor (The Anniversary, Crossroads, Rosie)
11 July	Brendan Grace	68	Comedian (Father Ted) and singer
12 July	Emily Hartridge	35	Television presenter and YouTube star
14 July	Karl Shiels	47	Actor (Peaky Blinders)
19 July	Jeremy Kemp	84	Actor (The Winds of War, Z-Cars, The Blue Max)
23 July	Nika McGuigan	33	Actress (The Tudors, Hollyoaks: The Morning After)
25 July	Jimmy Patton	87	Comedian (ChuckleVision) and half of the Patton Brothers
29 July	Paula Williamson	38	Actress (Coronation Street, Emmerdale)
3 August	Joe Longthorne	64	Singer and entertainer
10 August	Freda Dowie	91	Actress (Distant Voices, Still Lives, The Old Curiosity Shop, The Omen)
16 August	Anna Quayle	86	Actress (Grange Hill)
18 August	Gillian Hanna	75	Actress (Brookside, Les Misérables, Oliver Twist)
23 August	Sheila Steafel	84	Actress (Daleks' Invasion Earth 2150 A.D., Quatermass and the Pit, The Ghosts of Motley Hall)
29 August	Terrance Dicks	84	Screenwriter (Doctor Who, Crossroads, Space: 1999)
10 September	Valerie Van Ost	75	Actress (Carry On, The Beauty Jungle, Mister Ten Per Cent)
14 September	Jean Heywood	98	Actress (When the Boat Comes In, Our Day Out, Billy Elliot)
15 September	Leah Bracknell	55	Actress (Emmerdale, Doctors, The Royal Today)
20 September	Diarmuid Lawrence	71	Television director (The Hanging Gale, Little Dorrit, Peter and Wendy)
September	Hanna Yusuf	27	Journalist (BBC News)
1 October	Peter Sissons	77	Journalist, broadcaster (BBC News, ITN) and television presenter (Question Time)
4 October	Stephen Moore	81	Actor (Rock Follies, A Bridge Too Far, The Last Place on Earth, The Hitchhiker's Guide to the Galaxy, The Queen's Nose, Merseybeat)
10 October	Juliette Kaplan	80	Actress (Last of the Summer Wine, Coronation Street)
12 October	Reg Watson	93	Producer and screenwriter (Crossroads)
17 October	Wendy Williams	84	Actress (Crossroads, Doctor Who)
6 November	Tazeen Ahmad	48	Journalist and news presenter
6 November	Richard Lindley	83	Journalist and news presenter
12 November	Ian Cullen	80	Actor (Z-Cars, Family Affairs)
14 November	Jean Fergusson	74	Actress (Last of the Summer Wine, Coronation Street)
24 November	Clive James	80	Writer and broadcaster (Clive James on Television, Saturday Night Clive)
26 November	Gary Rhodes	59	Television chef (MasterChef, Hell's Kitchen)
1 December	Paula Tilbrook	89	Actress (Emmerdale, Coronation Street, Last of the Summer Wine)
3 December	Donald Tosh	84	Screenwriter (Doctor Who)
4 December	Sheila Mercier	100	Actress (Emmerdale)
4 December	Bob Willis	70	Cricketer and Sky Sports commentator
11 December	David Bellamy	86	Naturalist and broadcaster
15 December	Nicky Henson	74	Actor (Fawlty Towers, EastEnders, Downton Abbey)
18 December	Claudine Auger	78	Actress (Thunderball, The Memoirs of Sherlock Holmes)
18 December	Kenny Lynch	81	Singer, actor (Carry On Loving, The Playbirds) and entertainer
22 December	Tony Britton	95	Actor (Operation Amsterdam, Sunday Bloody Sunday, The Day of the Jackal)
25 December	Neville Buswell	76	Actor (Coronation Street)
29 December	Neil Innes	75	Writer, comedian and musician (Monty Python, The Raggy Dolls)
