= Red Room Sessions =

Red Room Sessions may refer to:

- The Red Room Sessions, by Shakespears Sister
- Red Room Sessions (Busted EP)
- Red Room Sessions (Kym Marsh EP)
