= Bounty Island =

Bounty Island may refer to:

- Bounty Islands, a small group of 13 islets and numerous rocks in the south Pacific Ocean which are territorially part of New Zealand.
- Bounty Island, the common name of Kadavulailai Island in the Mamanuca Islands group, Fiji.

== See also ==
- Bounty (disambiguation)
