= Bounty =

Bounty or bounties commonly refers to:

- Bounty (reward), an amount of money or other reward offered by an organization for a specific task done with a person or thing

Bounty or bounties may also refer to:

== Geography ==
- Bounty, Saskatchewan, a ghost town located in Saskatchewan, Canada
- Bounty Bay, an embayment of the Pacific Ocean into Pitcairn Island, named for the ship
- Bounty Islands, a small group of 13 islets and numerous rocks in the south Pacific Ocean which are territorially part of New Zealand

== Arts, entertainment, and media ==
=== Fictional entities ===
- Bounty, an evil entity that possessed and took over the identity of the DC Comics character Dawnstar
- Bounty, the name given by James T. Kirk's crew to their captured Bird-of-Prey in Star Trek IV: The Voyage Home

=== Music ===
- bounty (album), a 2013 album by iamamiwhoami
- "Bounty" (song), a 2013 song by Dean Brody

=== Films ===
- Bounty, a 1993 documentary film, the first Kinopanorama production shot in Australia
- The Bounty (1984 film), a film with Mel Gibson and Anthony Hopkins
- The Bounty (2012 film), a Hong Kong film

=== Television episodes ===
- "Bounty" (The A-Team)
- "Bounty" (Blake's 7)
- "Bounty" (Star Trek: Enterprise)
- "Bounty" (Stargate SG-1)
- "Bounty" (The Walking Dead)
- "The Bounty" (Wander Over Yonder), see List of Wander Over Yonder episodes (2014)
- "The Bounty" (Star Trek: Picard), an episode of the third season of Star Trek: Picard
- "Bounty" (Star Wars: The Clone Wars)

=== Other arts, entertainment, and media ===
- Bounty (poker), a feature in some poker tournaments that rewards a player for eliminating another player

== Brands and enterprises ==
- Bounty (brand), a brand of paper towel manufactured by Procter & Gamble
- Bounty (chocolate bar), a brand of coconut-filled chocolate bar

== Ships ==
- Bounty (1960 ship), replica in the movie Mutiny on the Bounty with Marlon Brando; sunk in 2012 during Hurricane Sandy
- Bounty (1978 ship), replica in the movie The Bounty with Mel Gibson
- HMS Bounty, an 18th-century British Royal Navy ship

== Other uses ==
- Bounty (parenting club), a UK parenting and pregnancy club
- Bounty, historically, another word for a "subsidy"
- Bounty Day, the national holiday of Norfolk Island, celebrated on Pitcairn Island on a different day, commemorating the ship

== See also ==
- Bountiful (disambiguation)
- Mutiny on the Bounty (disambiguation)
