= Kym Marsh =

English actress, television presenter and singer (born 1976)

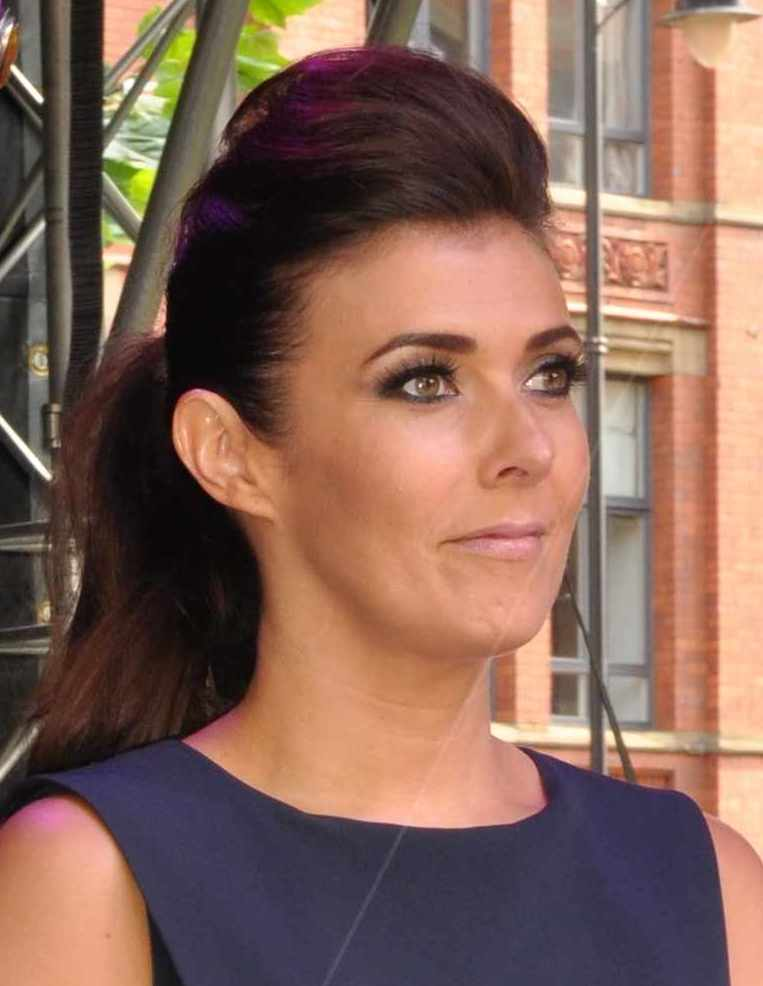
- Marsh in 2015
- Born: Kimberley Gail Marsh; 13 June 1976 (age 50); Whiston, Merseyside, England
- Occupations: Actress; singer; television presenter
- Years active: 2000–present
- Employer: BBC
- Spouses: Jack Ryder (m. 2002; div. 2009) Jamie Lomas (m. 2012; div. 2014) Scott Ratcliff (m. 2021; div. 2023)
- Children: 3
- Relatives: Charley Webb (former sister-in-law); Jack Hues (former father-in-law)
- Musical career
- Genres: Pop; rock
- Instrument: Vocals
- Label: Island
- Member of: Hear'Say

Kimberley Gail Marsh (previously Ryder, Lomas and Ratcliff; born 13 June 1976) is an English actress, television presenter and singer. In 2001, she won a place in the band Hear'Say as a result of appearing on the reality television series Popstars. Hear'Say enjoyed brief success, achieving two UK number-one singles and a UK number-one album, but Marsh left the band in 2002 to pursue a solo career. She released an album titled Standing Tall in 2003, which peaked at number nine in the UK and spawned two UK top-ten singles.

From 2006 to 2019, she portrayed Michelle Connor on the ITV soap opera Coronation Street. She won the British Soap Award for Best Newcomer at the 2007 British Soap Awards, as well as winning the Newcomer category at the 2007 National Television Awards and being nominated for Best Female Dramatic Performance at the 2017 British Soap Awards. In 2010, she finished in fourth place on Popstar to Operastar, a reality show featuring well-known pop stars being trained to sing opera. Since October 2020, Marsh has co-fronted the BBC One morning lifestyle programme Morning Live alongside Welsh presenter Gethin Jones. From 2023, Marsh appeared in the revival of the BBC school drama series Waterloo Road.

== Early life ==
Kimberley Gail Marsh was born on 13 June 1976 at Whiston Hospital in Whiston, Merseyside, to Pauline and David Marsh, who lived in Garswood. She has two older brothers and one older sister. Her father was a joiner and in his spare time was the lead guitarist for the band Ricky and the Dominant Four who were a supporting act to The Beatles at The Cavern Club. She attended Cansfield High School in Ashton-in-Makerfield and the Elliot Clarke Stage School in Liverpool for two years, leaving when she was 15.

== Music career ==
=== Early singing career and Hear'Say ===
Marsh provided session vocals for artists including Matt Darey, the group Freaky Realistic and the duo Hemstock & Jennings. She sang in Norwegian on the latter's track "Arctic", which caught the attention of Paul van Dyk, and was remixed and re-recorded with additional vocals from Jan Johnston. The track, renamed "Nothing But You", was released in the UK via Positiva and reached number 14 in the UK charts.

In late 2000, Marsh auditioned for the ITV talent show Popstars. She was one of the five singers chosen for the newly formed band Hear'Say, along with Danny Foster, Myleene Klass, Suzanne Shaw and Noel Sullivan. In March 2001, Hear'Say released their first single "Pure and Simple", a cover of a track by Girl Thing. She was hailed by her girl bandmates as "the funniest out of the bunch". The song went straight to number 1 on the UK Singles Chart in March 2001, selling just under 550,000 copies. The group then released their second single, "The Way to Your Love," in June 2001. The song became their second consecutive number 1 single. Shortly afterwards the group toured the UK. In January 2002, Marsh announced that she was leaving Hear'Say. Auditions were held to find a replacement for her, but the group split up in October 2002.

=== Solo career ===
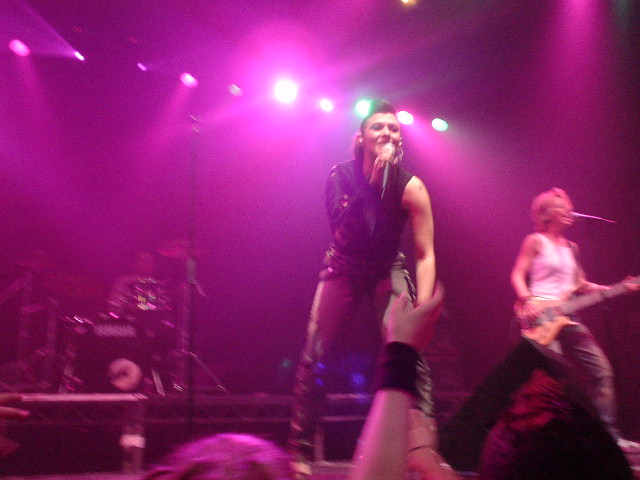
Marsh performing at G-A-Y in 2003

After a while out of the spotlight Marsh signed a solo record deal with Island Records. Her first single, "Cry", went to number 2 in the UK Singles Chart and her second single, "Come on Over," made it to number 10. In July 2003, Marsh released her debut solo album, Standing Tall, which peaked at number 9 in the UK. It contained three solo singles and twelve other tracks. However, her make-or-break third single, "Sentimental", stalled at number 35, and that resulted in her being dropped by her record label. In early 2006, Marsh entered Making Your Mind Up with a song titled "Whisper to Me", a show intended to pick a singer and a song for the UK entry in the Eurovision Song Contest. Marsh came fourth in the contest, which was won by Daz Sampson.

=== Hear'Say reunion ===
On 1 October 2026, precisely 24 years after Hear'Say's split, the group teased a reunion with four of the original members: Foster, Marsh, Shaw and Sullivan. On 8 October, the group announced that they would be embarking on a joint arena tour with Liberty X, Popstars: The Originals, in April and May 2027.

== Television career ==
Marsh made her television acting debut in 2005, in an episode of the BBC One soap opera Doctors, playing a character called Ruth Parry. That same year, she also became a regular panellist on ITV's daytime show Loose Women for its eighth series. In 2006, she played sex worker Kay Price in the first 2 episodes of Channel 4's soap opera Hollyoaks: In the City.

Marsh joined the cast of Coronation Street, playing Michelle Connor from April 2006, a role she held until 2019. For her role on the show she has subsequently received Newcomer awards at the 2007 British Soap Awards and the 2007 National Television Awards, among others. Becoming a regular character, her storylines have included a serious relationship with Steve McDonald (Simon Gregson), discovering that her son had been swapped at birth, the death of her eldest brother Paul (Sean Gallagher) and the murder of her other brother Liam (Rob James-Collier), her failed engagement to Ciaran McCarthy (Keith Duffy), surviving a minibus crash, becoming pregnant with Steve's baby, learning that Steve has also impregnated Leanne Battersby (Jane Danson), delivering a stillborn son Ruairi and being stalked by her ex-boyfriend Will (Leon Ockenden). Other storylines have focused on the relationships with her sisters-in-law, Carla (Alison King) and Maria (Samia Ghadie), as well as her relationship with Robert Preston (Tristan Gemmill) after the collapse of her marriage to Steve. In 2008, as the character dominated more storylines, some fans began to tire of her as well as her behaviour. The baby-swap storyline, which Michelle was central to, was largely panned by both fans and critics, columnist Grace Dent said of the plot; "...It feels like something ripped from a copy of Pick Me Up magazine and read to me laboriously over 22 weeks". In contrast, the 2017 stillbirth storyline as well as Marsh's performance received rave reviews and were praised by the stillbirth charity Sands. Marsh, whose real-life son Archie was also stillborn, explained that it was important for her to take on the storyline in order to raise awareness of the issue. She also voiced for the change in law which would see stillborn children receive birth certificates. The actress also stated it was "the best way to honour" her son. She later won the 2017 British Soap Award for Best Female Dramatic Performance. On 24 February 2019, it was announced that Marsh would be leaving the soap after 13 years and Michelle's final scenes were broadcast on 27 December 2019.

Marsh began presenting the daily morning magazine show Morning Live on BBC One on 26 October 2020, alongside Gethin Jones. The series ended on 18 December 2020 and the BBC confirmed on 17 December it would return in 2021 for a second series. In March 2021, Marsh appeared in the fourth series of the BBC One drama The Syndicate as Donna.

In February 2022, she was announced as one of the starring cast members of BBC's revival of their school drama Waterloo Road, which began airing in January 2023.

On 4 August 2022, it was announced that Marsh would be competing on the twentieth series of Strictly Come Dancing. She was partnered with Graziano Di Prima. The series launched on 24 September 2022. On 22 November 2022, it was announced that Marsh had tested positive for COVID and would, therefore, have to miss that Saturday's appearance on the show. She was the tenth celebrity to be eliminated, on 3 December 2022, after losing the dance off to Molly Rainford and Carlos Gu.

On 21 July 2025, it was announced that Marsh would appear in the UK/Australian co-commissioned series Imposter alongside Dannii Minogue & Neighbours actress Jackie Woodburne.

== Personal life ==
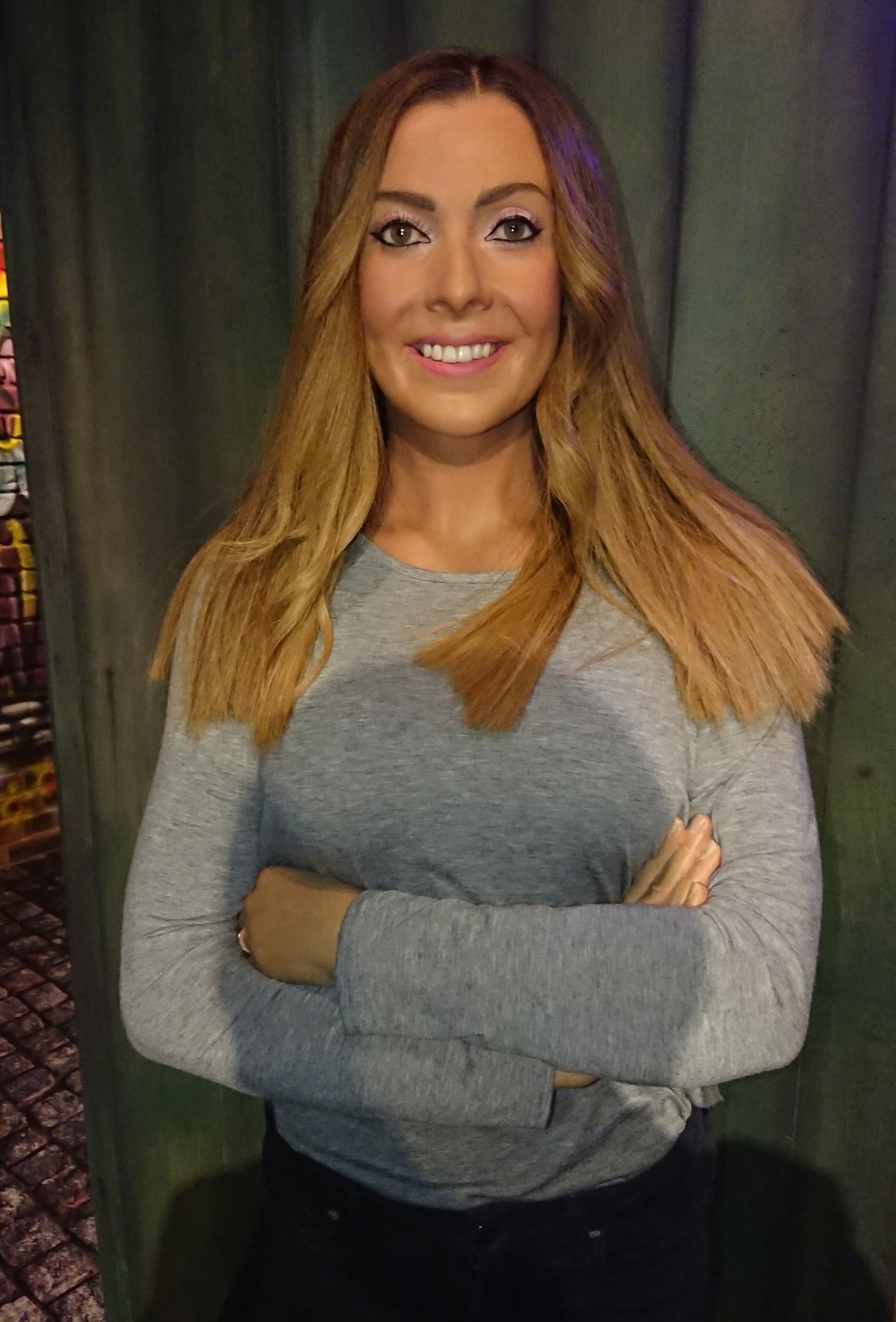
A wax figure of Marsh as Michelle Connor in the museum Madame Tussauds Blackpool

Marsh has been married and divorced three times and has three children and two grandchildren. She has a son named David (born 1995) and a daughter named Emilie (born 1997) from a relationship with Dave Cunliffe. She married the actor Jack Ryder in St Albans, Hertfordshire, on 10 August 2002. It was announced on 20 March 2008 that the couple had decided to separate and would be seeking a divorce; they announced their divorce on 12 August 2009.

In July 2008, Marsh began dating actor Jamie Lomas. They married in Cheshire in September 2012. She and Lomas announced that they were expecting a baby in 2009. Their son, Archie, was born 18 weeks early on 11 February and died moments after birth. On 23 March 2011, their daughter, Polly, was born. On 3 October 2012, Marsh announced that she would be taking Lomas' name professionally. They separated in 2013 and divorced in 2014. During the later stages of Marsh and Lomas’ marriage, Marsh had an affair with Coronation Street co-star Oliver Mellor.

In May 2017, a wax figure of Marsh's Coronation Street character was added to the gallery of Madame Tussauds Blackpool.

In May 2019, Marsh became a grandmother when her daughter Emilie had a son. On 14 June 2021, Marsh announced her engagement to army major Scott Ratcliff and they were married on 16 October 2021.

Marsh became a grandmother for the second time in August 2022, when her son David and his fiancée Courtney had a son named Clayton.

Marsh announced her separation from Ratcliff in May 2023 and they divorced later the same year.

== Filmography ==
=== Film ===
Year	Title	Role	Notes
2020	The Loss Adjuster	Angie Dyer	

=== Television ===
Year	Title	Role	Notes
2001	Popstars	Contestant	
2005	Loose Women	Panellist	
2005	Doctors	Ruth Parry	Episode: "Bad Chemistry"
2006	Holby City	Myrna Morrison	Episode: "Brother's Keeper"
2006	Making Your Mind Up 2006	Contestant	
2006	Hollyoaks: In the City	Kay Price	Recurring role; 3 episodes
2006–2019	Coronation Street	Michelle Connor	Regular role; 1,641 episodes
2010	East Street	Michelle Connor	Charity crossover between Coronation Street and EastEnders
2010	Popstar to Operastar	Contestant	
2016	EastEnders: Last Orders	Self	Television short
2018	Coronation Street's DNA Secrets	Herself	Television film
2019	Stalked: Murder in Slow Motion	Narrator	
2019–2022	For Love or Money	Co-presenter	25 episodes
2020	The One Show	Guest co–presenter	6 episodes
2020–2021	Murder at My Door with Kym Marsh	Presenter	2 series
2020	Your Money and Your Life	Co-presenter	15 episodes
2020–present	Morning Live	Relief presenter	
2021	The Syndicate	Donna Sanderson	Recurring role; 3 episodes
2022	Strictly Come Dancing	Contestant	Series 20
2023–present	Waterloo Road	Nicky Walters	Series regular
2025	The Weekend Travel Show	Co-presenter	With Richard Arnold
2025	Imposter	Amanda	TV mini series

=== Theatre ===
Year	Title	Role(s)	Playwright	Venue(s)	Ref.
2023	Greatest Days	Rachel	Tim Firth	UK & Ireland Tour	
2024	101 Dalmatians	Cruella De Vil	Zinnie Harris	UK & Ireland Tour	
2026	Single White Female	Hedy	John Lutz	UK & Ireland Tour	

== Discography ==
=== Studio albums ===
Title	Album details	Peak positions
Title	Album details	UK
Standing Tall	Released: 21 July 2003; Label: Island; Formats: CD, digital download	9

=== Extended plays ===
Title	Album details
Red Room Sessions	Released: 2003; Label: Island; Formats: CD

=== Singles ===
Year	Single	Peak positions		Album
Year	Single	UK	IRE	Album
2003	"Cry"	2	22	Standing Tall
2003	"Come on Over"	10	11	Standing Tall
2003	"Sentimental"	35	53	Standing Tall

== Awards and nominations ==
Year	Award	Category	Nominated for	Result	Ref.
2007	2007 British Soap Awards	Best Newcomer	Coronation Street	Won	
2007	2007 British Soap Awards	Best Actress	Coronation Street	Nominated	
2007	2007 British Soap Awards	Sexiest Female	Coronation Street	Nominated	
2007	2007 Inside Soap Awards	Best Actress	Coronation Street	Nominated	
2007	2007 Inside Soap Awards	Best Couple (shared with Simon Gregson)	Coronation Street	Nominated	
2007	2007 TV Choice and TV Quick Awards	Best Soap Newcomer	Coronation Street	Won	
2007	2007 TV Now Awards	Favourite Newcomer to Irish	Coronation Street	Won	
2007	2007 National Television Awards	Most Popular Newcomer	Coronation Street	Won	
2008	2008 Digital Spy Soap Awards	Sexiest Female	Coronation Street	Nominated	
2008	2008 British Soap Awards	Sexiest Female	Coronation Street	Nominated	
2008	2008 British Soap Awards	Best Actress	Coronation Street	Nominated	
2008	2008 Inside Soap Awards	Best Dressed Soap Star	Coronation Street	Won	
2008	2008 Inside Soap Awards	Best Actress	Coronation Street	Nominated	
2008	2008 TRIC Awards	TV Soap Personality	Coronation Street	Won	
2008	2008 TV Now Awards	Favourite Female Soap Star	Coronation Street	Won	
2008	2008 TV Now Awards	Favourite Soap Couple (shared with Simon Gregson)	Coronation Street	Nominated	
2008	2008 Inside Soap Awards	Best Dressed Soap Star	Coronation Street	Won	
2008	2008 All About Soap Bubble Awards	Best Celebrity Style	Coronation Street	Won	
2009	2009 Inside Soap Awards	Best Actress	Coronation Street	Nominated	
2009	2009 Inside Soap Awards	Best Dressed Soap Star	Coronation Street	Shortlisted	
2010	2010 British Soap Awards	Sexiest Female	Coronation Street	Nominated	
2010	2010 TV Now Awards	Ireland's Most Glamorous TV Star	Coronation Street	Nominated	
2015	2015 Inside Soap Awards	Sexiest Female	Coronation Street	Shortlisted	
2015	2015 TRIC Awards	Soap Personality	Coronation Street	Nominated	
2016	2016 Inside Soap Awards	Sexiest Female	Coronation Street	Shortlisted	
2017	2017 TRIC Awards	Soap Personality	Coronation Street	Won	
2017	2017 British Soap Awards	Best Female Dramatic Performance	Coronation Street	Won	
2017	2017 British Soap Awards	Best Actress	Coronation Street	Shortlisted	
2017	2017 TV Choice Awards	Best Soap Actress	Coronation Street	Shortlisted	
2017	2017 Inside Soap Awards	Best Actress	Coronation Street	Longlisted	
2017	2017 RTS North West Awards	Best Performance in a Continuing Drama	Coronation Street	Won	
2017	Digital Spy Awards	Best Soap Actress	Coronation Street	Nominated	
2017	2017 TVTimes Awards	Favourite Soap Star	Coronation Street	Nominated	
2018	2018 TRIC Awards	Soap Actor	Coronation Street	Nominated	
2022	2022 RTS North West Awards	Best Breakthrough Talent	Morning Live	Nominated	
2023	2023 Inside Soap Awards	Best Drama Star	Waterloo Road	Shortlisted	
2024	2024 TV Choice Awards	Best Actress	Waterloo Road	Longlisted	

=== Other ===
Year	Award	Result	Ref.
2008	La Redoute's 2008 Celebrity Mum of the Year Award	Shortlisted	
2008	Tesco Magazine's 2008 Mum of the Year Award	Won	
2009	Bounty's 2009 Celebrity Mum of the Year Award	Won	
2015	2015 Rear of the Year Award	Won	
