= Bountiful =

Bountiful may refer to:

== Places ==
- Bountiful (Book of Mormon) refers to two historical places:
  - Bountiful (Old World), location in Arabia
  - Bountiful (New World), a city in the Americas
- Bountiful, British Columbia, Canada
- Bountiful, Colorado, United States
- Bountiful, Utah, United States
  - Bountiful Peak, Utah, US

== Arts, entertainment, and media ==
- The Trip to Bountiful (play), 1953 play
  - The Trip to Bountiful, 1985 film based on the play
    - The Trip to Bountiful, 2014 TV Movie

== Other uses ==
- Bountiful, a variety of green beans

== See also ==
- Bounty (disambiguation)
