= Red Room Sessions (Kym Marsh EP) =

EP by Kym Marsh
- Released: 2003
- Genre: Pop
- Label: Island

Kym Marsh chronology
Standing Tall (2003)	Red Room Sessions (2003)

Red Room Sessions is an extended play by British singer Kym Marsh which was released in 2003 as a limited edition CD. It could be obtained by collecting a certain amount of tokens through Smash Hits or cans of Coca-Cola. This EP is the second edition of the Red Room Sessions, following the release by Busted.

The CD includes "The Girl I Used to Be" from Marsh's debut album, Standing Tall, as well as a cover of "Every Kinda People", originally recorded by Robert Palmer, which can only be found on this release. Another exclusive to the CD is an interview with Marsh.

The Red Room Sessions were a series of live performances by pop acts, held in small venues with up-and-coming artists providing support.

== Track listing ==
No.	Title	Writer(s)	Length
1.	"The Girl I Used to Be"	Espen Lind, Amund Bjørklund
2.	"Every Kinda People"	Andy Fraser
3.	"Interview"
