= Standing Tall (Kym Marsh album) =

Studio album by Kym Marsh
- Released: 21 July 2003
- Genre: Pop, pop rock
- Length: 56:14
- Label: Island

Kym Marsh chronology
Standing Tall (2003)	Red Room Sessions (2003)

Singles from Standing Tall
- 1. "Cry" Released: 7 April 2003; 2. "Come On Over" Released: 7 July 2003; 3. "Sentimental" Released: 27 October 2003

Professional ratings
Review scores
Source	Rating
Allmusic	3.5/5 stars
Entertainment.ie	1/5 stars
The Guardian	2/5 stars
BBC	Mixed

Standing Tall is the debut and only studio album by former Hear'Say singer Kym Marsh. It was released on 21 July 2003 in the United Kingdom by Island Records.

The album was preceded by two single releases: "Cry", the lead single, and "Come on Over" which reached number 2 and 10 respectively on the UK Singles Chart. Standing Tall peaked at number 9 on the UK Albums Chart after selling 19,821 copies in the first week. Marsh's third single, "Sentimental", was released in October 2003 and stalled at number 35, resulting in her being dropped by the record label.

== Track listing ==
No.	Title	Writer(s)	Producer(s)	Length
1.	"Cry"	Espen Lind, Amund Bjørklund	Espionage	3:44
2.	"Come on Over"	Ash Howes, Martin Harrington, Deborah Andrews	Ash Howes, Martin Harrington	3:53
3.	"Sentimental"	Avril Mackintosh, Julie Thompson, Wayne Wilkins	Avril Mackintosh, Wayne Wilkins	3:16
4.	"I Think It's Gonna Rain Today"	Rob Davis, Martin Harrington, Ash Howes	Ash Howes, Martin Harrington	3:35
5.	"After Goodbye"	Tim Hawes, Pete Kirtley, Sean Solomon	Jiant	3:36
6.	"The Girl I Used to Be"	Espen Lind, Amund Bjørklund	Espionage	3:40
7.	"Standing Tall"	Espen Lind, Amund Bjørklund, Tor Erik Hermansen	Espionage	3:21
8.	"Cross Every River"	Espen Lind, Amund Bjørklund	Espionage	3:40
9.	"Glow"	Kym Marsh, Jim Marr, Wendy Page	Rampage	3:10
10.	"Live Forever"	Espen Lind, Amund Bjørklund, Bob Dylan	Espionage	3:26
11.	"Shine on Me"	Espen Lind, Amund Bjørklund, Tor Erik Hermansen	Espionage	3:27
12.	"Because of You"	Kym Marsh, Tim Hawes, Pete Kirtley	Jiant	3:40
13.	"Here Comes Heaven"	Kym Marsh, Jim Marr, Wendy Page	Rampage	4:06
14.	"Tempted" (United Kingdom only)	Trevor Steel, John Holiday	Trevor Steel, John Holiday	4:02
15.	"Don't Break My Heart" (United Kingdom only)	Mark Topham, Karl Twigg, John Robinson Reid	TNT	4:21

== Charts ==
Chart (2003)	Peak position
Scottish Albums Chart	9
UK Albums Chart	9
