= Cry (Kym Marsh song) =

2003 single by Kym Marsh

Single by Kym Marsh

from the album Standing Tall
- B-side: "All Over You"; "Lost in Love"
- Released: 7 April 2003
- Studio: Espionage
- Genre: Pop
- Length: 3:44
- Label: Universal; Island
- Songwriter(s): Espen Lind; Amund Bjørklund
- Producer(s): Espionage

Kym Marsh singles chronology
"Cry" (2003)	"Come on Over" (2003)

"Cry" is the debut solo single by former Hear'say member Kym Marsh, released on 7 April 2003 in the United Kingdom. The song was written by Espen Lind and Amund Bjørklund for Marsh's debut album Standing Tall. "Cry" peaked at number two on the UK Singles Chart in its second week of release, and it also charted in Ireland and the Netherlands.

== Reception ==
The song received mostly positive reviews from music critics, in contrast to the reviews of her debut album. In her review of the album Standing Tall, BBC Music's Ruth Mitchell wrote "Opener "Cry" isn't a fantastic start. The acoustic guitar introduction has been used to death...and the melody, although pleasant, packs no punches and holds no surprises." Yahoo! Music called it a "homage to Natalie Imbruglia's "Torn" and "it's this track that sets the breezy-mostly-written-by-Norwegians guitar pop template on which the rest of the album follows." The Guardian's Betty Clarke called the song "a catchy, chick-lit ode to wrong-doing".

== Track listings ==
UK CD1

1. "Cry" (album version) – 3:44
2. "All Over You" – 2:52
3. "Lost in Love" – 3:52
4. "Cry" (video)

UK CD2 and cassette single

1. "Cry" (radio edit) – 3:18
2. "Cry" (instrumental) – 3:18
3. "Cry" (Paul Simm mix) – 4:02
4. "Cry" (Almighty mix) – 8:24

European CD single 1

1. "Cry" – 3:40
2. "All Over You" – 2:52
3. "Lost in Love" – 3:52

European CD single 2

1. "Cry" (radio edit) – 3:18
2. "Cry" (Almighty mix) – 3:24

== Charts ==
=== Weekly charts ===
Chart (2003)	Peak position
Europe (Eurochart Hot 100)	10
Ireland (IRMA)	25
Netherlands (Single Top 100)	80
Scotland (OCC)	2
UK Singles (OCC)	2

=== Year-end charts ===
Chart (2003)	Position
UK Singles (OCC)	75
