= Come On Over (Kym Marsh song) =

2003 single by Kym Marsh

"Come on Over"

Single by Kym Marsh

from the album Standing Tall
- B-side: "Forever"; "Cry" (acoustic)
- Released: 7 July 2003
- Length: 3:27
- Label: Universal; Island
- Songwriters: Deborah Andrews; Martin Harrington; Ash Howes
- Producers: Martin Harrington; Ash Howes

Kym Marsh singles chronology
"Cry" (2003)	"Come on Over" (2003)	"Sentimental" (2003)

"Come on Over" is a song written by Deborah Andrews, Martin Harrington, and Ash Howes for former Hear'Say member Kym Marsh's debut album, Standing Tall (2003). It was released as the second solo single on 7 July 2003 in the United Kingdom and peaked number 10 on the UK Singles Chart.

== Track listings ==
UK CD1

1. "Come on Over" (album version)
2. "Forever"
3. "Cry" (acoustic version)
4. "Come on Over" (video)

UK CD2

1. "Come on Over" (radio edit)
2. "Come on Over" (Almighty mix)
3. "Come on Over" (Illicit mix)

UK cassette single

1. "Come on Over" (radio edit)
2. "Forever"
3. "Come on Over" (Illicit mix)

== Charts ==
Chart (2003)	Peak position
Europe (Eurochart Hot 100)	38
Scottish Singles Sales (Official Charts)	9
UK Singles (Official Charts)	10
