= Albert Shepherd (actor) =

English actor (1936–2019)

- Born: 29 August 1936; York, England
- Died: 10 July 2019 (aged 82); York, England
- Occupation: Actor
- Years active: 1965–1981
- Spouse: Rosaleen Dummigan (m. 1967)
- Children: 3

Albert Shepherd (29 August 1936 – 10 July 2019) was an English actor, known for playing Don Rogers in Crossroads from 1970 until 1974.

== Life and career ==
Albert was born and raised in York and attended the St George's Roman Catholic Secondary School. Before becoming an actor he worked as a railway engineer for nine years, then decided to try acting so went off to Webber Douglas Academy of Dramatic Art in London for two years.

He starred in a TV series called Rosie, which was filmed in Scarborough, from 1979 to 1981, and also appeared in the 1968 film Secret Ceremony alongside Elizabeth Taylor. He was also the first person to speak on the 1969 movie Battle of Britain, and appeared in a number of other films and TV series.

Albert retired from acting in the mid-1980s following the death of his wife Rosaleen to look after his three children—Anthony, Jonathan and Gerard.

He lived in Crayke north of York for the last 45 years of his life.

Albert died at York Hospital from lung cancer in July 2019, aged 82, just three weeks after he was diagnosed.

== Filmography ==
=== Film ===
Year	Title	Role	Notes
1967	Quatermass and the Pit	Loader	Uncredited
1968	The Anniversary	Construction Worker	
1968	Charlie Bubbles	Policeman	
1968	Before Winter Comes	Second British Soldier	
1969	Battle of Britain	Soldier at Self-propelled Gun	Uncredited

=== Television ===
Year	Title	Role	Notes
1965	Compact	Waiter	Episode: "Action for Libel"
1965	Danger Man	First Prison Guard	Episode: "Two Birds with One Bullet"
1967	Market in Honey Lane	Customer	Episode: "Hearts and Flowers"
1969	Strange Report	Hayes	Episode: "Report 3906: Cover Girls - Last Year's Model"
1970	Department S	Lomax	Episode: "The Bones of Byrom Blain"
1971	Thirty-Minute Theatre	Guard	Episode: "Faith"
1970–1974	Crossroads	Don Rogers	Recurring role
1974	Notorious Woman	Pietro Pagello	Episode: "Conflict"
1977	Emmerdale Farm	Fred Teaker	One episode
1979–1981	Rosie	'Englebert'	10 episodes, (final appearance)
