= Stalked: Murder in Slow Motion =

- Genre: Crime, Documentary
- Directed by: Alex Scott; Jessica Rajna
- Presented by: Kym Marsh
- Country of origin: United Kingdom
- No. of series: 1
- No. of episodes: 3

Production
- Executive producers: Andy Dunn; Ian Rumsey; George Waldrum
- Producers: Lucy Johnstone; Jessica Rajna; Alex Scott
- Cinematography: Siggi Rosen-Rawlings
- Editors: Stephanie Amponsah; Tim Auld; Larry Molloy; Josh O'Brien; Owen Griffiths; Anil Douglas; Benjamin Rose
- Running time: 65 minutes
- Production companies: ITN Productions; Channel 5 Television

Original release
- Network: Channel 5
- Release: 5 February – 19 February 2019

Stalked: Murder in Slow Motion is a crime, television documentary mini-series narrated by Kym Marsh. The series explores the impact of stalking on women. One of the aims of the documentary is to highlight these dangers and encourage people to support legislation changes in order to prevent future stalkings and murders.

== Episodes ==
| No. overall | No. in season | Title | Directed by | Narrated By | Original release date | United Kingdom viewers (millions) |
|---|---|---|---|---|---|---|
| 1 | 1 | "Molly McLaren" | Jessica Rajna | Kym Marsh | 5 February 2019 | 866,000 |
Molly and Joshua met in November 2016 through Tinder, they dated for seven months until Molly ended their relationship. Two weeks later, Joshua attacked Molly in her car and in a frenzy stabbed her multiple times and cut her throat. In February 2018, Joshua was found guilty of murder and sentenced to 26 years in prison.
| 2 | 2 | "Hollie Gazzard" | Jessica Rajna | Kym Marsh | 12 February 2019 | N/A |
| 3 | 3 | "Clare Bernal" | Jessica Rajna | Jessica Rajna | 19 February 2019 | N/A |
Alarm bells went off when Michael said he loved her after just three dates. Claire complained to her bosses and the police, Michael was arrested but freed on bail without charges. He continued to stalk Claire for several months and was eventually charged in court of stalking, but again was granted bail. In September 2005, Michael snuck into the luxury store and shot Claire four times in the back of the head in front of customers, before turning the pistol on himself.

== Development ==
Just before the documentary Kym Marsh shared her own experiences to the Sun about living in fear from stalkers.
