= Rubbena Aurangzeb-Tariq =

British, Muslim artist based in London

Rubbena Aurangzeb-Tariq (born 1971) is a British Muslim artist based in London. She is deaf and a British Sign Language user.

== Early life and education ==
Aurangzeb-Tariq was born in 1971; her family had previously settled in England from Pakistan. She graduated from Central Saint Martins in London with a BA in 1995. She was awarded an MA in fine art from the Surrey Institute of Art & Design in 1996. She also holds an MA in art psychotherapy from Goldsmiths University and an additional MA in psychodynamics.

== Career ==
=== Artistic practice ===
Aurangzeb-Tariq's work has been exhibited nationally and internationally since 1992, in solo shows (London and Oxford) and in group exhibitions (London, Montreal, Paris and Birmingham). Her work concerns deaf identity and explores the idea of belonging to a "minority within a minority" and the intersection between deafness, Muslim culture and feminism. In 2007, she collaborated with architects at the University of Northumbria to examine how deafness, accessibility and building design affect one another.

In 2013, she created new work sponsored by Arts Council England which examined marriage traditions within Asian families and the emotional impact on women. She works in a variety of media, such as painting (mainly abstract and conceptual art), sculpture (for example casts of her hands) and installations with lights and colours. She was the lead artist for the "Translating the Deaf Self" project, a joint academic and artistic project exploring deaf people's lived experience of being represented through translation. In it she developed a range of paintings exploring deafness and colour. As an artist and BSL user, she has worked with the Royal Collections Trust to deliver experiences for deaf visitors.

=== Psychotherapy ===
In her art psychotherapy practise, Aurangzeb-Tariq works particularly with children and adults who have experienced a wide range of mental, emotional and behavioural issues. As an expert in sexual and relationship education for deaf people, she provides consultancy and training to deaf young people and professionals in the field. She currently works as a consultant and trainer on health education for the charity Deafax and the NHS, and she has been part of a team developing the Signly app, aimed at improving accessibility for deaf people by translating English into British Sign Language.

She is a founder member of the Deaf Ethnic Women's Association (DEWA) and sits on the board of trustees of Deaf Aspirations and BSL Zone.

== Media ==
Aurangzeb-Tariq has appeared on television a number of times, including on the BBC's See Hear and on ITV in the 2019 series Create. In 2020, she was a speaker at the Women of the World Festival in London.

== Awards ==
- Deaf Explorers Arts Award.
