= Bountiful Peak =

Mountain in Utah

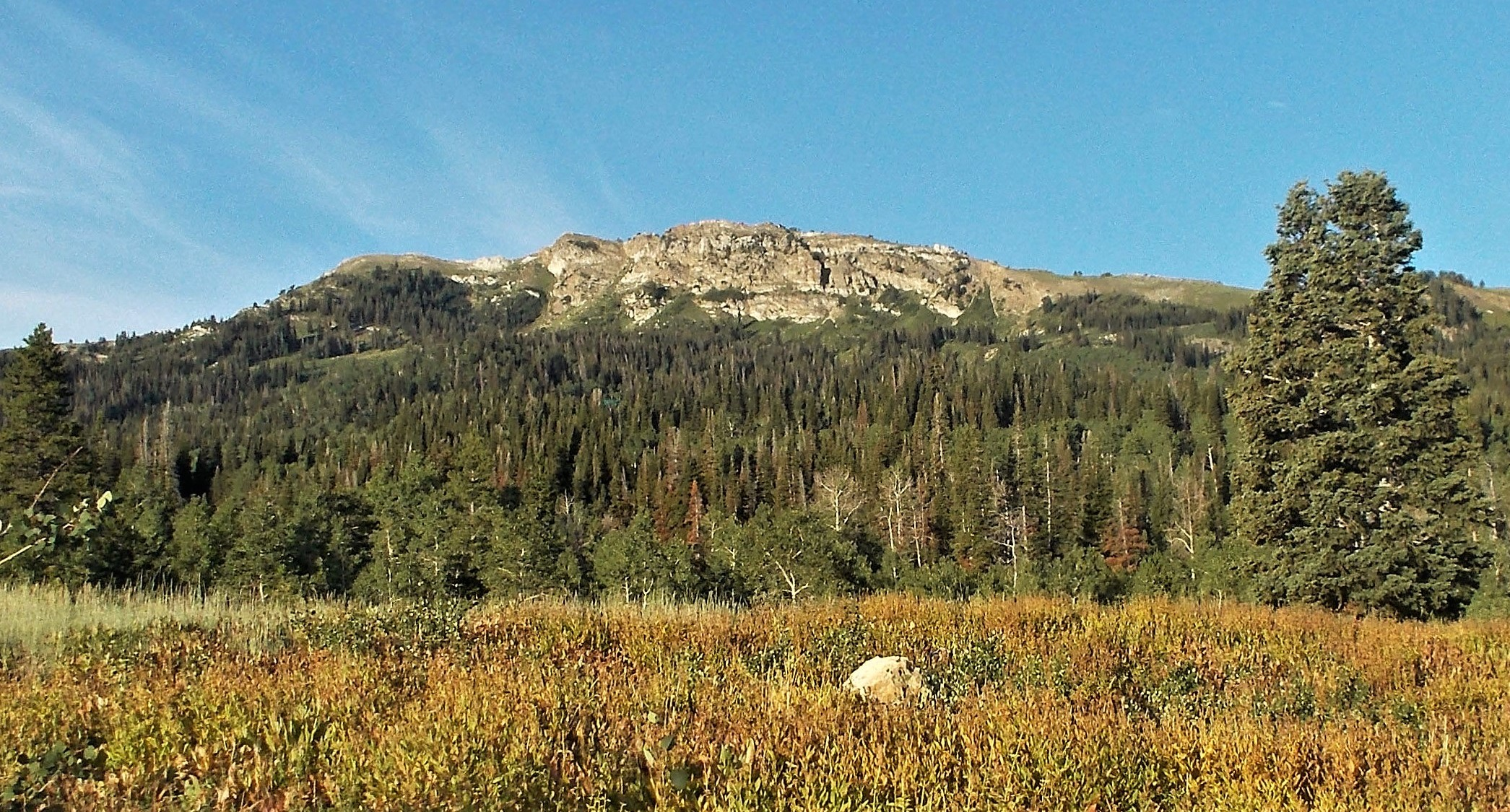
- Northeast aspect, from Farmington Flats

Highest point
- Elevation: 9,259 ft (2,822 m)
- Prominence: 1,219 ft (372 m)
- Parent peak: Francis Peak (9,560 ft)
- Isolation: 4.86 mi (7.82 km)
- Coordinates: 40°57′52″N 111°49′06″W

Geography
- Location within Utah Location within the United States
- Country: United States of America
- State: Utah
- County: Davis
- Parent range: Wasatch Range; Rocky Mountains
- Topo map: USGS Bountiful Peak

Climbing
- Easiest route: class 1 hiking trail

Bountiful Peak is a 9,259-foot elevation (2,822 m) mountain summit located in Davis County, Utah, United States.

== Description ==
Bountiful Peak is situated in the Wasatch Range which is a subset of the Rocky Mountains, and it is set on land managed by Wasatch-Cache National Forest. The community of Bountiful is six miles to the south-southwest and Farmington is four miles to the northwest. Precipitation runoff from the mountain's slopes ultimately drains to Great Salt Lake. Topographic relief is significant as the summit rises over 5,000 feet (1,500 meters) above Interstate 15 in four miles. Skyline Drive and the Great Western Trail traverse the peak, providing an approach option. This landform's toponym has been officially adopted by the U.S. Board on Geographic Names and is named in association with the nearby town, which in turn refers to Bountiful in the Book of Mormon. On November 4, 1940, United Airlines Flight 16 struck Bountiful Peak due to navigational equipment failure while on an Oakland-Salt Lake City passenger service, killing all 10 on board.

== See also ==
- List of mountain peaks of Utah
