= Jamie's Meat-Free Meals =

2019 British cooking TV series

- Also known as: Jamie's Ultimate Veg
- Starring: Jamie Oliver (host)
- Narrated by: Jamie Oliver
- Opening theme: "I Can't Wait" by Nu Shooz
- Country of origin: United Kingdom
- Original language: English
- No. of seasons: 1
- No. of episodes: 8

Production
- Running time: 27 minutes (approx.; UK)

Original release
- Network: Channel 4
- Release: 2 September – 21 October 2019

Jamie's Meat-Free Meals is a UK food lifestyle programme which aired on Channel 4 in 2019. In each half-hour episode, host Jamie Oliver creates inspirational vegetarian meals. In the show, Oliver also explores vegetarianism in the United Kingdom and abroad.

The show premiered on 2 September 2019 and concluded with its series finale episode on 21 October 2019.

== Episodes ==
=== Season 1 (2019) ===
No. overall	No. in season	Title	Original release date
1–01	1	"Cottage Pie & Bonkers Chip Butty"	2 September 2019
Jamie cooks a veggie Cottage Pie, After trying veggie street food in Delhi, Jamie cooks an indian inspired chip butty. The chef visits a London school that only serves vegetarian food. Jamie rustles up Greens Mac 'N' Cheese.
1–02	2	"Scruffy Lasagna & Bigged-Up Broccoli"	9 September 2019
Scruffy aubergine lasagna is the first dish cooked up. Jamie visits Azadpur Fruit & Vegetable Market, Asia largest fruit and vegetable market. The chef whips up an Angry Bean Salad. Jamie then tries his hand at making vegetarian sushi in London. Finally, he makes Crispy-Bottomed Steam Dumplings.
1–03	3	"Bean Burger, Charred Salad, Spicy Curry"	16 September 2019
Jamies makes a Roasted Black Bean Burger. In Jerusalem Jamie tries Fattoush, a type of Levantine Middle Eastern salad. Still in Jerusalem he tries some Egyptian vegetarian food. The chef makes a Double Corn Salad. Jamie visits Gurudwara Bangla Sahib, the largest Sikh temple in Delhi and helps cooks the Langar for worshippers. Following on from his visit to India, Jamie cooks his Amazing Tomato Curry.
1–04	4	"Veggie Pad Thai & Cauliflower Cheese Pizza Pie"	23 September 2019
Jamie cooks a veggie Pad Thai. In Jodhpur, northwest India Jamie learns about local vegetarian food. Back in his kitchen Jamie cooks a Roast New Potato & Pickle Salad. In Dagenham, East London a farm growing organic vegetables and fruit being grown and cooked by locals. Back in Jamie's kitchen he cooks a deep-pan Cauliflower Cheese Pizza Pie.
1–05	5	"Asparagus, Sweet Leek Carbonara, Roasted Cauliflower"	30 September 2019
Jamie knocks up an Asparagus Quiche & Asparagus Soup. A trip to an organic farm in Enfield, England to see how organic vegetables are grown. A Sweet Leek Carbonara is cooked up next. In Jerusalem, Jamie experiences the vibrant vegan food scene and tries a vegan Doner kebab. Roasted Cauliflower is the last dish made.
1–06	6	"Kick-Ass Chilli & Pasties"	7 October 2019
Jamie cooks his Amazing Veggie Chilli. The chef try local vegetarian food in Rajasthan, India. Jamie makes Spiced Parsnip Soup. He tries falafel in Bethlehem and Pan de Pita, a type of Sabich in Tel Aviv. Back in his kitchen, Jamie makes Veggie Pasties.
1–07	7	"Onion Tart, Pumpkin Rice & Butter Bean Stew"	14 October 2019
Jamie shows us how to make his Sticky Onion Tart. Jamie visits East London to see how vegetarian Caribbean food is made. Jamie makes Jamaican themed Pumpkin Rice & Butter Bean Stew. In Jerusalem, Jamie enjoys stuffed figs with spiced mushrooms and local stuffed vegetables. Stuffed Curried Aubergines are made by Jamie.
1–08	8	"Tomato Risotto, Spinach Pancakes, Summer Veg Blanket Pie"	21 October 2019
Jamie makes Roasted Tomato Risotto. In Jerusalem Jamie has a local vegetarian breakfast. Jamie shows us how to make Super Spinach Pancakes. Jamie visits an East London charity that teaches people to cook vegetarian food. The final dish of the series sees Jamie cook a Summer Veg Blanket Pie.

== Book ==
- Veg: Easy & Delicious Meals for Everyone, ISBN 978-0718187767

== Note ==
Outside the United Kingdom, the series is known as Jamie's Ultimate Veg.
