= Bounty (parenting club) =

- Company type: Promotions company
- Industry: Parenting and pregnancy services
- Founded: 1959
- Founder: Bill Hopewell-Smith
- Fate: Acquired by Kaboose, Inc. (29 November 2007)
- Headquarters: Welwyn Garden City, United Kingdom
- Area served: United Kingdom
- Services: Pregnancy and parenting information; Product sampling and promotional packs (e.g., maternity/new mother packs); Newborn photography services in hospitals
- Website: www.bounty.com

Bounty is a promotions company, pregnancy and parenting club. The pregnancy club gives advice in the areas of pregnancy, baby names and baby products. The company provides a range of informational material, product samples and access to an internet forum.

The organization is headquartered in Welwyn Garden City, the United Kingdom. On November 29, 2007, Bounty was acquired by Kaboose, Inc. (TSX: KAB)

Bounty's parenting club offers information, support and products for families from the pre-birth to the pre-school period.

Bounty claims to have 2.5 million members.

== History ==
Bounty Parenting Club

Founded in 1959 by Bill Hopewell-Smith, the company was initially based in London and counted 6 employees and launched its first sample offering - The New Mother Pack. The company provides payments to the trusts which operate hospitals, and has access to new mothers. They provide "goodie bags" to new mothers and take pictures of newborn babies in many hospitals across England and Wales.

== Controversy ==
The Telegraph in 2009 reported several complaints about hard selling techniques used to obtain new photograph contracts. Bounty stated that it operates "...purely on a basis of choice with mums and hospitals and we take our responsibilities very seriously." These complaints resurfaced in 2013 following a Mumsnet internet survey that indicated similar experiences.

Bounty has also recently been fined £400,000gbp for the unlawfully sharing data belonging to 14 million people.

== Media references ==
Products were featured in the television series Holby City when Patsy Kensit gave a Bounty pack to a colleague.

== Awards ==
From October - December, 2007, www.bounty.com was ranked #4 in the Hitwise United Kingdom 'Lifestyle - Family' industry based on number of visits.

This ranking relates to UK based users visiting UK websites.
