= Mutiny on the Bounty (disambiguation) =

The Mutiny on the Bounty was a mutiny on HMS Bounty that occurred in 1789.

Mutiny on the Bounty may also refer to:

- Mutiny on the Bounty (novel), a 1932 novel by Charles Nordhoff and James Norman Hall
- Mutiny on the Bounty (1935 film), a film by Frank Lloyd starring Charles Laughton
- Mutiny on the Bounty (1962 film), a film by Lewis Milestone starring Marlon Brando
- Mutiny on the Bounty (band), a Luxembourgish rock band formed in 2004
- Mutiny on the Bounty, a 2008 novel by John Boyne

== See also ==
- A Narrative of the Mutiny on board His Majesty's Ship "Bounty", the account of the 1789 mutiny by William Bligh
- "The Mutineers of the Bounty", an 1879 short story by Jules Verne
- The Mutiny of the Bounty, a 1916 film by Raymond Longford, starring John Storm
- In the Wake of the Bounty, a 1933 film by Charles Chauvel, starring Errol Flynn and Mayne Lynton
- The Bounty (1984 film), a film by Roger Donaldson starring Anthony Hopkins
- Mutiny on the Bunny, a Looney Tunes cartoon starring Bugs Bunny and Yosemite Sam
