= The Cameron Years =

British television series

The Cameron Years is a two-part 2019 documentary television series on the premiership of David Cameron. Drawing on an exclusive interview with Cameron, the series explores his leadership, the events that led to the EU referendum, and his impact on British politics. The airing of the programme in September coincided with The Cameron Interview on ITV.

Leading politicians connected to Cameron appeared on the programme, including George Osborne, Iain Duncan Smith, Michael Heseltine, Michael Gove, and Nick Clegg.

== Episodes ==
No. in series	Title	Directed by	Original release date	UK viewers (millions)
1	"A Huge Fight on My Hands"	Ian Leese	19 September 2019	N/A
2	"The Best Is Yet to Come"	Ian Leese	26 September 2019	N/A

== Reception ==
The New Statesman described the mini-series as "a parade of entitlement, cowardice and careerism". Writing in The Times, Hugo Rifkind said of the former Prime Minister, "his poshness is in another league".

The Independent's Sean O'Grady wrote "He [David Cameron] is destined to be eternally friendless. He certainly comes across as very lonely and despondent in The Cameron Years".
