= Kaboose =

Canadian media company

Kab Distribution Inc.
- Company type: Subsidiary
- Industry: Information Technology Services
- Founded: 1999 in Toronto, Ontario
- Headquarters: Toronto, Ontario, Canada
- Key people: Jason DeZwirek
- Number of employees: 105

Kaboose was a Canadian media company targeting the broader English-speaking market across North America. It published a website of the same name which focused on family activities and parenting for mothers of children under 12.

On February 14, 2006, the Company graduated to the Toronto Stock Exchange ("TSX") from the TSX Venture Exchange and officially began trading on the TSX. In May 2006, Kaboose acquired the Newton, Mass.-based BabyZone.com pregnancy and parenting website for US$22 million. Kaboose had revenue of CAD$20.6 million in 2006 and $35.5 million in 2007.

Babyzone focused on preconception and early years; Kaboose focused on older kids and growing families. Retailer Aston Baby's website contains a history of Babyzone from its 1990s founding by Jeanine Cox to its 2014 shuttering by Disney.

Kaboose's CEO was Jason DeZwirek. Assets of the company were acquired by the Walt Disney Company on April 1, 2009, for CAD$23.3 million. Remaining assets were sold to Barclays Private Equity for about $97 million.

By September 2016, the website could no longer be reached, except on the Internet Archive Wayback Machine.
