= Red Room Sessions (Busted EP) =

EP by Busted
- Released: 2003
- Recorded: 2002
- Genre: Pop punk
- Label: Island

Red Room Sessions is an EP by Busted which was released as a limited edition promotional CD single. It could be obtained by collecting a certain amount of tokens through Smash Hits and cans of Coca-Cola. Accordingly, its catalogue number was "COKE01".

The CD contained two songs from their first album Busted — including an exclusive mix of "What I Go to School For" — with a cover of the 1964 Beach Boys song "Fun, Fun, Fun", first released as a B-side to "Year 3000".

The Red Room Sessions was a series of live performances by pop acts, held in small venues with up-and-coming artists providing support.

== Track listing ==
1. "What I Go to School For" (Alternative Remix) – 3:33
2. "Dawson's Geek" – 2:27
3. "Fun Fun Fun" – 2:17
