= List of Billboard Blues Albums number ones of the 1990s =

Blues Albums is a music chart published weekly by Billboard magazine which ranks the top selling blues albums in the United States, ranked by sales data as compiled by Nielsen SoundScan. The chart debut as the Top Blues Albums in the issue dated September 2, 1995, as a 15-position chart with its first number one being Eric Clapton's From the Cradle.

Its introduction was a culmination of commercial realities at the time and a recognition of the "enduring legacy and artistic force of this timeless genre".

== Number-one blues albums of the 1990s ==
These are the albums which have reached number one on the Blues Albums chart during the 1990s, listed chronologically. Note that Billboard publishes charts with an issue date approximately 7–10 days in advance.

Issue date	Album	Artist(s)	Weeks at number one	Ref.
1995
September 2	From the Cradle	Eric Clapton	1	
September 9	Cover to Cover	The Jeff Healey Band	1	
September 16	From the Cradle	Eric Clapton	9	
November 18	Greatest Hits	Stevie Ray Vaughan and Double Trouble	17	
1996
March 16	Ledbetter Heights	Kenny Wayne Shepherd	20	
August 3	Good Love!	Johnnie Taylor	3	
August 24	A Tribute to Stevie Ray Vaughan	Various artists	8	
October 19	Good Love!	Johnnie Taylor	9	
December 21	Greatest Hits	Stevie Ray Vaughan and Double Trouble	6	
1997
February 1	Help Yourself	Peggy Scott-Adams	9	
April 5	Lie to Me	Jonny Lang	19	
August 16	Live at Carnegie Hall	Stevie Ray Vaughan and Double Trouble	8	
October 11	Lie to Me	Jonny Lang	1	
October 18	Live at Carnegie Hall	Stevie Ray Vaughan and Double Trouble	1	
October 25	Trouble Is...	Kenny Wayne Shepherd Band	4	
November 22	Deuces Wild	B.B. King	13	
1998
February 21	Blues Brothers 2000	Soundtrack	7	
April 11	Trouble Is...	Kenny Wayne Shepherd Band	22	
September 12	Slow Down	Keb' Mo'	4	
October 10	Trouble Is...	Kenny Wayne Shepherd Band	4	
November 7	Wander This World	Jonny Lang	22	
1999
April 10	The Real Deal: Greatest Hits Volume 2	Stevie Ray Vaughan and Double Trouble	18	
August 14	Blues	Eric Clapton	10	
October 23	In Session	Albert King with Stevie Ray Vaughan	1	
October 30	Live On	Kenny Wayne Shepherd Band	25	
