= Live! in Chicago =

Live album by Kenny Wayne Shepherd
- Released: September 27, 2010
- Genre: Blues, Rock
- Label: Roadrunner

Kenny Wayne Shepherd chronology
10 Days Out: Blues from the Backroads (2007)	Live! in Chicago (2010)	How I Go (2011)

Live! In Chicago is a blues album by Kenny Wayne Shepherd Band.

== Critical reception ==
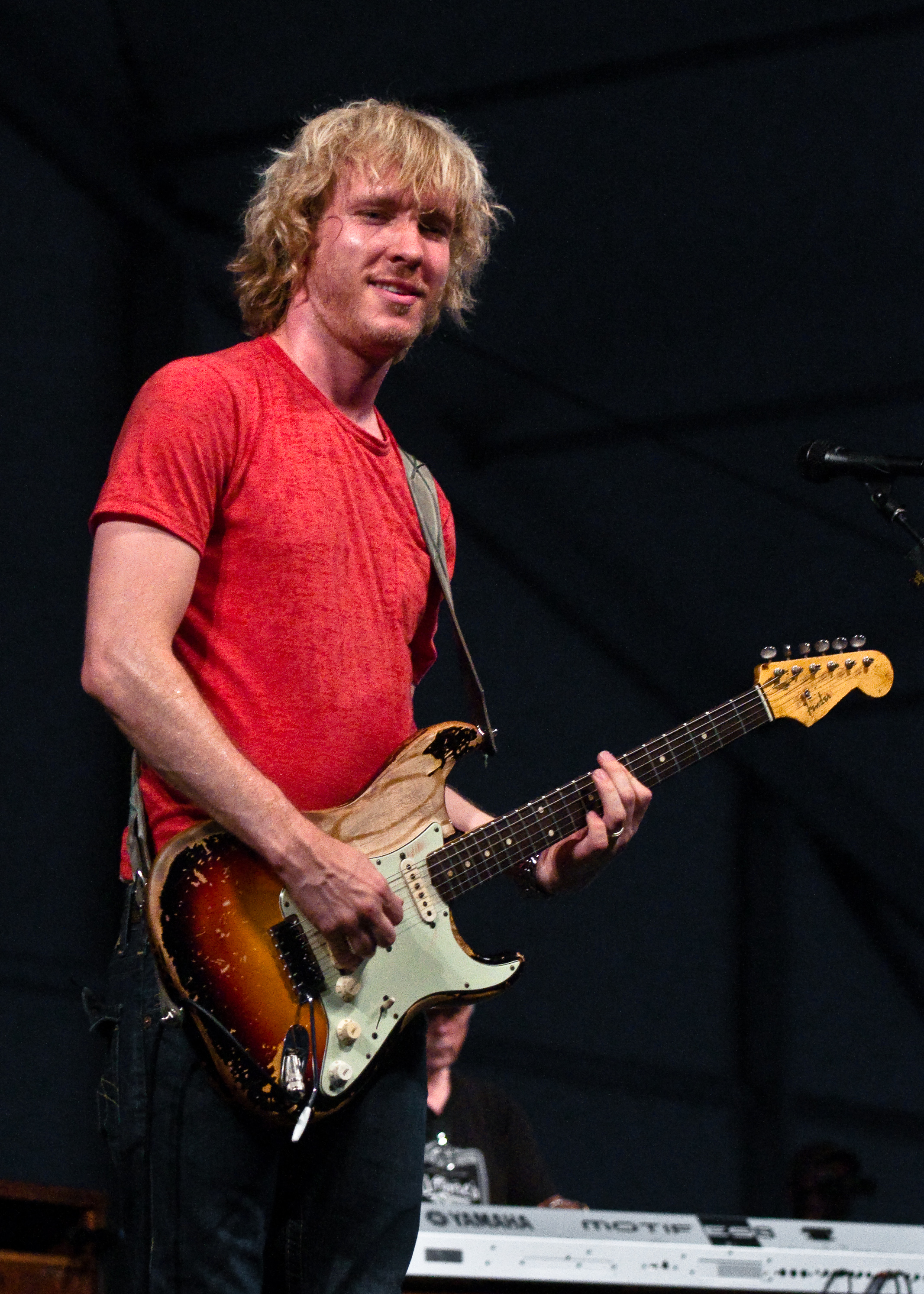
Kenny Wayne Shepherd live in New Orleans

On AllMusic, Steve Leggett wrote, "[Kenny Wayne Shepherd] does play a hot lead guitar – that, in a nutshell, is what he does. But over the years he's also learned that the blues isn't just about blazing lead licks, it's also about letting the song say its say – and on Live! In Chicago he does that.... This isn't a live album from some teenaged savant – it's an album from a grown man proud and honored to be playing the blues with some of his heroes. It also rocks."

== Track listing ==
1. "Somehow, Somewhere, Someway"
2. "King's Highway"
3. "True Lies"
4. "Deja Voodoo"
5. "Sell My Monkey" (with Buddy Flett)
6. "Dance For Me Girl" (with Buddy Flett)
7. "Baby, Don't Say That No More" (with Willie "Big Eyes" Smith)
8. "Eye To Eye" (with Willie "Big Eyes" Smith)
9. "How Many More Years" (with Bryan Lee)
10. "Sick And Tired" (with Bryan Lee)
11. "Feed Me" (with Hubert Sumlin)
12. "Rocking Daddy" (with Hubert Sumlin)
13. "Blue On Black"
14. "I'm A King Bee"

== Personnel ==
- Kenny Wayne Shepherd – lead guitar, vocals
- Scott Nelson – bass guitar
- Chris Layton – drums
- Riley Osbourne – Hammond B3, keyboards
- Noah Hunt – lead vocals, rhythm guitar
- Hubert Sumlin
- Willie "Big Eyes" Smith
- Bryan Lee
- Buddy Flett
