= Kelly Norris Sarno =

Canadian film producer

- Born: Edmonton, Alberta, Canada
- Occupation: Executive Producer

Kelly Norris Sarno is the owner of Agency Arts, an agency that manages a select group of creatives from various disciplines such as: music video, still photography and fine art. She was previously Executive Producer and owner of production company Symphony 19, based in Los Angeles, California.

Born in Edmonton, Alberta, Canada, Norris Sarno began in the music video field in 1994 in Toronto, Ontario, Canada as a Line Producer for directors such as Andrew MacNaughtan and Floria Sigismondi. She is credited with producing Sigismondi's groundbreaking clip "The Beautiful People" for artist Marilyn Manson. She has line produced well over 50 music video productions for recording artists: Tricky, David Bowie, Filter, Barry Adamson, Great Big Sea, Esthero and others.

In 2000, Norris Sarno opened the U.S. branch of The Revolver Film Co. in Los Angeles, CA as its sole executive producer.

In February 2008, she was nominated for a Grammy Award for Best Long Form Music Video at the 50th Grammy Awards for the film 10 Days Out: Blues from the Backroads by Kenny Wayne Shepherd. The film was directed by Noble Jones.

Also in 2008, Norris Sarno Co-Executive Produced the live concert DVD The Black Parade Is Dead! by My Chemical Romance. The DVD was directed by Atom Rothlein.
