= Have Harmony, Will Travel =

Studio album by Carla Olson
- Released: April 30, 2013
- Genre: Roots rock, Americana
- Length: 43:52
- Label: Busted Flat
- Producer: Carla Olson

Carla Olson chronology
Detroit 85: Live and Unreleased (2008)	Have Harmony, Will Travel (2013)	Have Harmony, Will Travel 2 (Sunset Blvd Records)

Professional ratings
Review scores
Source	Rating
Allmusic	4/5 stars

Have Harmony, Will Travel is an album by singer and songwriter Carla Olson. It was released by Busted Flat Records on April 30, 2013 and marked Olson's first studio album since her 2001 release The Ring of Truth (in between, she and her band, the Textones, had produced Detroit 85: Live and Unreleased, a live album released in 2008).

== Overview ==
Carla Olson desire to cut a duet record had been in development for several decades. In an interview with journalist Mike Ragogna she stated:

Several years ago, I was in between production projects, which is what I mainly do. I haven't done a studio album in a long time, mainly because I've been working at producing. One day I just thought, "Well, I'm in between projects. Maybe I should try to start something." I approached a couple of people about doing a duet album, one of them being Peter Case, who I’ve known since the '70s, and he said, "Yeah, I’d love to."

Olson then rounded up a host of her friends and bandmates as well as some of her favorite singers. Among these were Juice Newton, who duets with Olson in "You Can Come Cryin' to Me", the album's opening track, and "Stringin' Me On". Olson and Peter Case team on the Del Shannon tune "Keep Searchin' (We'll Follow the Sun)" and on Moby Grape's "8:05". Initially, Olson was to have performed "8:05" with her recording partner, Gene Clark, but he died before the recording was made. "She Don't Care About Time", a song written by Clark, was performed with Richie Furay.

In his review of the album music critic Thom Jurek stated:

Though there isn't a weak cut in bunch, there are some soaring highlights It ends the set by seamlessly melding folk, rock, and country. Have Harmony, Will Travel is a welcome return for Olson, but that's not all. With its direct, kinetic production, compelling song choices, and inspired performances, it is a blueprint for future duet recordings.

== Track listing ==
No.	Title	Writer(s)	Duet with	Length
1.	"You Can Come Cryin’ To Me"	Radney Foster	Juice Newton	4:52
2.	"Look What You’ve Done"	Wes Farrell, Bob Johnston	Rob Waller	3:21
3.	"Love’s Made a Fool Of You"	Buddy Holly, Bob Montgomery	James Intveld	2:28
4.	"Keep Searchin' (We'll Follow the Sun)"	Del Shannon	Peter Case	2:36
5.	"Still Waters"	Chris Jagger	Gary Myrick	4:35
6.	"She Don’t Care About Time"	Gene Clark	Richie Furay	2:54
7.	"All I Needed Was You"	Steven Van Zandt	Scott Kempner	5:22
8.	"The First In Line"	Paul Kennerley	John York	3:23
9.	"Stringin’ Me On"	James Intveld	Juice Newton	4:08
10.	"Upon a Painted Ocean"	P. F. Sloan	John York	3:40
11.	"8:05"	Jerry Miller, Don Stevenson	Peter Case	2:45
12.	"Til The Rivers All Run Dry"	Wayland Holyfield, Don Williams	Rob Waller	3:48

== Personnel ==
- Carla Olson – acoustic and electric guitar, vocals
- Peter Case – featured artist, acoustic, rhythm and electric guitar, vocals
- Richie Furay – featured artist, vocals
- James Intveld – featured artist, electric guitar, vocals
- Scott Kempner – featured artist, rhythm guitar, vocals
- Gary Myrick – featured artist
- Juice Newton – primary artist, vocals
- Rob Waller – featured artist, vocals
- John York – 12-string guitar, acoustic guitar, vocals
- Clem Burke – drums
- Cindy Cashdollar – lap steel guitar
- Mike Clinco – nylon string guitar
- Skip Edwards – piano
- Tom Fillman – drums
- Barry Goldberg – Hammond B3, piano
- Rick Hemmert – drums
- Tony Marsico – bass
- Tom Junior Morgan – saxophone
- Richard Podolor – nylon string guitar, mandolin
- Marty Rifkin – pedal steel guitar
- Pat Robinson – bass, piano
- Gregg Sutton – bass
