= Neal Pattman =

American singer

- Also known as: Big Daddy Pattman
- Born: January 10, 1926; Madison County, Georgia, United States
- Died: May 4, 2005 (aged 79) Athens, Georgia, United States
- Genres: Electric blues
- Occupations: Singer, harmonica player, songwriter
- Instruments: Harmonica, vocals
- Years active: 1960s–2005
- Labels: Global Village, Music Maker, Bent Notes

Neal Pattman (January 10, 1926 – May 4, 2005) was an American electric blues harmonica player, singer and songwriter. Sometimes billed as Big Daddy Pattman, he is best known for his self-penned tracks, "Prison Blues" and "Goin' Back To Georgia". In the latter, and most notable stages of his long career, Pattman worked with Cootie Stark, Taj Mahal, Dave Peabody, Jimmy Rip, Kenny Wayne Shepherd, Guitar Gabriel, and Lee Konitz.

== Biography ==
Pattman was born in Madison County, Georgia, United States, one of fourteen children. He learned harmonica playing from his father, after an accident involving a wagon wheel at the age of nine left him with only his left arm. Inspired by Sonny Terry's playing and distinctive whoops and hollers, Pattman played on the street corners of nearby Athens, Georgia. He found regular employment in the University of Georgia's kitchens, and gained further experience and local adoration for his regular live performances at various clubs and festivals. However, his more general renown was minimal until 1989, when he performed at the Lincoln Center for the Performing Arts in New York City.

A meeting in 1991 with Tim Duffy, of the Music Maker Relief Foundation, led to Pattman playing with Cootie Stark, supporting Taj Mahal, on a nationwide Blues Revival Tour. Playing with the British blues guitarist, Dave Peabody, led to Pattman releasing three albums between 1995 and 2001. He also contributed to Kenny Wayne Shepherd's album and DVD, 10 Days Out: Blues from the Backroads, which was released in 2007.

However, Pattman had already died of bone cancer in May 2005, in Athens, Georgia, aged 79.

== Discography ==
Year	Title	Record label
1995	The Blues Ain't Left Yet	Global Village Records
1999	Prison Blues	Music Maker
2001	It Seemed Like a Dream	Bent Notes Records

== See also ==
- List of electric blues musicians
