= Last of the Great Mississippi Delta Bluesmen: Live in Dallas =

2007 live blues album

Live album by David "Honeyboy" Edwards, Robert Lockwood Jr., Pinetop Perkins, and Henry Townsend
- Released: February 12, 2007
- Recorded: October 16, 2004, at the Majestic Theatre, Dallas, Texas, United States
- Genre: Delta blues
- Length: 76:32
- Language: English
- Label: The Blue Shoe Project
- Producer: Jeffry Dyson and Michael Dyson

David "Honeyboy" Edwards chronology
Back to the Roots (2001)	Last of the Great Mississippi Delta Bluesmen: Live in Dallas (2007)	Roamin' and Ramblin' (2008)

Robert Lockwood Jr. chronology
Legend Live (2004)	Last of the Great Mississippi Delta Bluesmen: Live in Dallas (2007)	Robert Lockwood Plays Robert Johnson (2011)

Pinetop Perkins chronology
10 Days Out: Blues from the Backroads (2007)	Last of the Great Mississippi Delta Bluesmen: Live in Dallas (2007)	Pinetop Perkins and Friends (2008)

Henry Townsend chronology
My Story (2004)	Last of the Great Mississippi Delta Bluesmen: Live in Dallas (2007)	Classic Piano Blues from Smithsonian Folkways (2008)

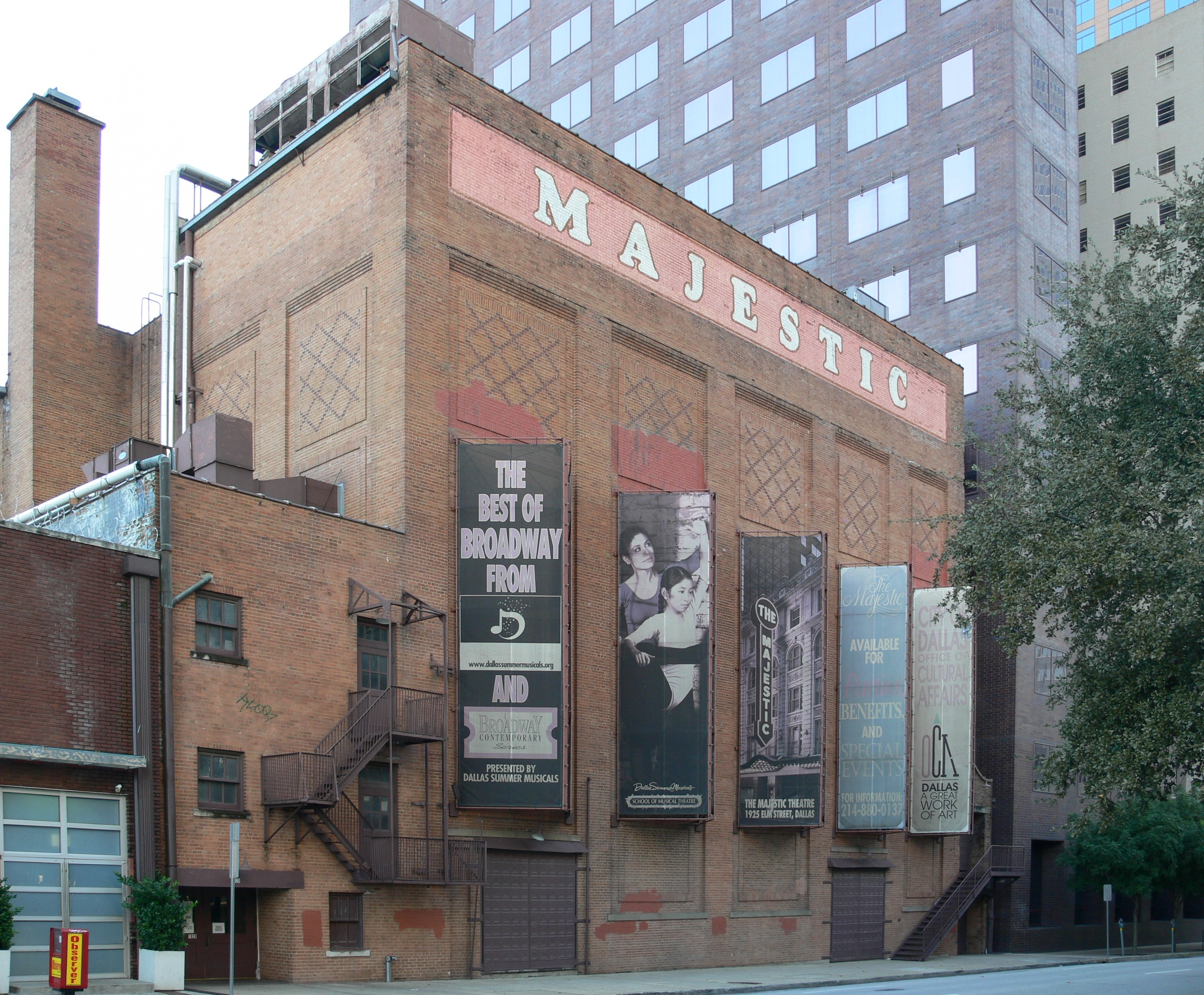
The Majestic Theatre in Dallas, Texas hosted this historic performance

Last of the Great Mississippi Delta Bluesmen: Live in Dallas is a live blues album, recorded in Dallas, Texas, in October 2004 by Henry James Townsend, Joe Willie "Pinetop" Perkins, Robert Lockwood Jr. and David "Honeyboy" Edwards. At the event, the four blues legends were from 89 to 94 years old and represented the last performers of Delta blues from the 1920s. The concert was arranged by the 501(c)(3) non-profit The Blue Shoes Project, which aims to preserve and spread awareness of roots music amongst students.

Two years after the concert, both Lockwood and Townsend were dead, and by early 2011, only Edwards was still alive. He died later that year.

== Critical reception ==
In 2007, the album was nominated for Best Traditional Blues Album and won the following February at the 50th Grammy Awards. It was also nominated for a Blues Music Award for Traditional Blues Album of the Year. By January 2009, the album had sold less than 1,000 copies.

== Track listing ==
1. Robert Lockwood Jr. – "King Biscuit Time" (McKinley Morganfield) – 2:55
2. Pinetop Perkins – "Chicken Shack" (Ike Turner) – 4:42
3. Henry Townsend – "It's Got to End Somewhere" (Tonwsend) – 3:56
4. David "Honeyboy" Edwards – "Catfish Blues" (Robert Petway) – 2:58
5. Pinetop Perkins – "Down in Mississippi" (J. B. Lenoir) – 3:36
6. Robert Lockwood Jr. – "Hangin' On" (Robert Lockwood, Jr.) – 5:17
7. Henry Townsend – "All My Money's Gone" (Roosevelt Sykes) – 4:57
8. David "Honeyboy" Edwards – "Sweet Home Chicago" (Robert Johnson) – 3:09
9. Pinetop Perkins – "Kansas City" (Jerry Leiber and Mike Stoller) – 4:53
10. Henry Townsend – "If I Asked You" (Townsend) – 6:08
11. Robert Lockwood Jr. – "Got to Find Me a Woman" (Lockwood) – 4:56
12. David "Honeyboy" Edwards – "Country Boy" (Muddy Waters) – 3:13
13. Pinetop Perkins – "Got My Mojo Working" (Preston Foster) – 5:11
14. Henry Townsend – "If You Don't Want Me" (Townsend) – 5:59
15. Robert Lockwood Jr. – "For You My Love" (Lockwood) – 4:37
16. David "Honeyboy" Edwards – "Apron Strings" (Edwards) – 1:49
17. Henry Townsend – "Blind Girl Blues" (Townsend) – 4:21
18. Robert Lockwood Jr. – "See See Rider" (Lena Arnet and Ma Rainey) – 3:55

== Personnel ==
David Honeyboy Edwards

- David "Honeyboy" Edwards – guitar and vocals

Robert Lockwood Jr.

- Robert Lockwood Jr. – guitar and vocals
- Charles "D. C." Carnes – guitar
- Gus Hawkins – alto and tenor saxophone
- Jimmy "Gator" Hoare – drums and backing vocals
- Benny Mostella – trumpet
- Maurice Reedus – tenor saxophone and backing vocals
- Gene Schwartz – bass guitar
- Robert "Red Top" Young – keyboards and backing vocals

Pinetop Perkins

- Pinetop Perkins – piano and vocals
- Diunna Greenleaf – backing vocals
- Jonn Richardson – guitar
- James Rose – drums
- Stephen Schneider – harmonica

Henry Townsend

- Henry Townsend – guitar, piano, and vocals
- Larry Johnson – bass guitar
- John May – bass guitar

Technical personnel

- Anne E. Dyson – photography
- Jeffry Dyson – executive production, production
- Michael Dyson – executive production, production
- Wade Griffith of Holt Design, Inc. – design
- Paul Grupp – engineering, mastering, mixing
- Scott Shuman – engineering, mastering, mixing, production
