= Chris Jagger =

English musician (born 1947)

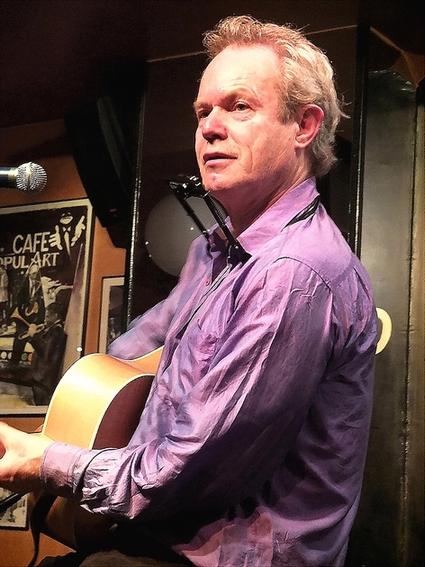
- Jagger in 2013

Background information
- Born: Christopher Jagger; 19 December 1947 (age 78); Dartford, Kent, England
- Genres: Cajun; zydeco; folk; country; roots; blues; rock
- Occupations: Musician; singer; songwriter; actor; producer
- Relatives: Mick Jagger (brother)
- Instruments: Guitar; vocals; harmonica; washboard
- Website: chrisjaggeronline.com

Christopher Jagger (born 19 December 1947) is an English musician and actor. He is the younger brother of Mick Jagger, the frontman of the Rolling Stones.

== Early life and education ==
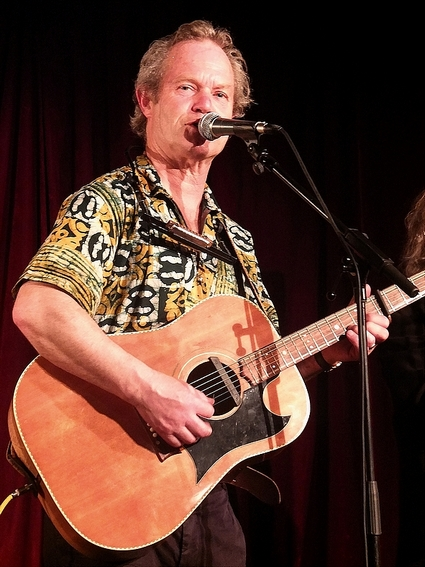
Jagger performing in Strasbourg in 2013

Jagger was born into a middle-class family in Dartford, Kent. His father, Basil Fanshawe "Joe" Jagger (13 April 1913 – 11 November 2006), was a teacher. His mother, Eva Ensley Mary (née Scutts; 6 April 1913 – 18 May 2000), was born in New South Wales, Australia to English parents, and was a hairdresser.

Jagger attended secondary school at Eltham College. He won a place to study drama at the University of Manchester, but opted not to attend so he could spend time in London, where his elder brother Mick was enjoying his first years of fame.

== Career ==
Jagger has worked in many fields, including theatre, cinema, clothes design, and decoration. He designed the jacket with eyes worn by Jimi Hendrix. He appeared in the musical Hair in Tel Aviv for six months, and later with the Black Theatre of Brixton at the Institute of Contemporary Arts in London with Rufus Collins. He then joined The Glasgow Citizens' Theatre, where he appeared with Kieran Hinds, Pierce Brosnan, and Sian Thomas. He also played repertory theatre in Nottingham, Plymouth, and Hammersmith Lyric London.

In the 1970s, his project for recording an album with the Flying Burrito Brothers was aborted. In the 1980s, he contributed on two of the Rolling Stones' albums, Dirty Work (1986) and Steel Wheels (1989) while he also worked in France with Vanessa Paradis's producer, Franck Langolff.

Jagger has worked as a journalist, contributing articles for The Daily Telegraph, The Guardian, The Mail on Sunday, The Independent on Sunday, and Rolling Stone. He wrote and presented for a BBC Radio 2 programme about Alexis Korner, a blues pioneer, and co-produced a film, I Got the Blues in Austin, for the Sky Arts channel.

In England, he also organised charity concerts, including in support of Bosnia (Bop for Bosnia) and Tibet, including one at Alexandra Palace in London in the presence of the Dalai Lama, where the acts included David Gilmour and Sinéad O'Connor.

Jagger's third album was released in 1994. Since this date, his musical style has changed to incorporate elements of cajun, zydeco, folk, country, blues, and swamp rock.

Jagger's song "Still Waters" appears on the 2013 Carla Olson album Have Harmony, Will Travel.

Jagger teamed with his brother Mick for two duets to mark the 40th anniversary of his debut album.

In April 2018 it was announced that Jagger would be the support act at six concerts in June 2018 of the German popstar Nena, a long-time fan of the Rolling Stones who had met Jagger during one of his performances in Verden the previous October.

In 2021, he recorded a duet titled "Anyone Seen My Heart" with his brother Mick and produced an accompanying video.

His song, "Hey Brother", is about his relationship with his brother Mick.

=== Guitar company ===
Jagger and his business partner Pat Townshend founded the guitar company Staccato in the mid-1980s. Townshend designed the magnesium alloy guitar, The Staccato, featuring a neck and bridge system that can be swapped out. The user can interchange a bass neck for a six-string neck. Some models feature no volume or tone pots. The user can activate the volume controls on a touch sensitive LED pad.

A prototype bass was built in Norfolk, England in 1983, and a business partnership was formed to produce Staccato guitars at the schoolhouse in Woodbastwick, Norfolk. The partners included Townshend, Bill Wyman, and Chris and Mick Jagger. The company went under in 1987. Gene Simmons played a Staccato bass during Kiss' Crazy Nights World Tour.

== Personal life ==
Jagger has been married to Norwegian former model and actress Kari-Ann Muller for over 40 years, and they have five sons. The family relocated from North London to Somerset (near) Glastonbury in 2000, and "relish" their country living ethos with their flock of sheep.

In 2021, Jagger penned his 400-page autobiography Talking To Myself, published by BMG Books.

== Discography ==
=== Albums ===
- 1973: You Know the Name But Not the Face
- 1973: Chris Jagger (US #186)
- 1974: The Adventures of Valentine Vox the Ventriloquist
- 1994: Atcha
- 1995: Rock the Zydeco (US edition of Atcha)
- 1996: From Lhasa to Lewisham
- 2001: Channel Fever
- 2006: Act of Faith
- 2009: The Ridge
- 2013: Concertina Jack
- 2014: Chris Jagger's Acoustic Roots
- 2017: All The Best
- 2021: Mixing up the Medicine

=== Contributions ===
- 1976: Eric Clapton: No Reason to Cry (vocals)
- 1997: Knights of the Blues Table – one track: "Racketeer Blues" (with Mick Jagger on harmonica)
- 2003: Rick Payne : Sessions – one track: "Blue Eyes Crying2
- 2005: Edith Lefel : Mèci – one track: 2L'isine Fémin2
- 2007: Whatever Colors You Have in Your Mind (tribute to Bob Dylan) – one track: "To Be Alone With You"
- 2008: Flipron : Gravity Calling (vocals)
- 2009: Thank You, Georges! (tribute to Georges Brassens) – one track: "First Love" ("La Première Fille")
- 2010: Mustique Blues Festival – one track: "Evil"

== Filmography ==
=== Cinema ===
- 1972 : Lucifer Rising
- 1978 : The Stud
- 1979 : Home Before Midnight
- 1979 : The Bitch
- 1985 : Lifeforce (L'étoile du mal)
- 2000 : Attraction
- 2009 : I Got the Blues in Austin – Co-producer (Jagger Peyton Films)

=== Television ===
- 1979 : BBC2 Playhouse – 1 episode : Standing in for Henry
- 1980 : Shoestring – 1 episode : Find the Lady

== Bands and musicians ==
=== Atcha Acoustic (1996) ===
- Chris Jagger: guitar, harmonica
- Charlie Hart: fiddle, accordion
- Ben Waters : piano

=== Chris Jagger's Atcha! ===
- Chris Jagger: guitar, harmonica, washboard
- Charlie Hart: fiddle, accordion, piano, bass, double bass
- Malcolm Mortimore: drums
- Jim Mortimore: bass, guitar, double bass

The first version of the band also included Paul Emile on bass and Jim Mortimore on guitar.

=== Chris Jagger's Acoustic Trio ===
- Chris Jagger : guitar, harmonica
- Elliet Mackrell : fiddle, didgeridoo
- David Hatfield : double bass

Apart from the band members, contributions also came from several artists such as

- Ed Deane
- Dave Stewart (Eurythmics)
- David Gilmour (Pink Floyd) – guitar
- Mick Jagger (The Rolling Stones), Sam Brown – vocals

Steve Laffy has also played drums and percussion with Chris on many occasions. Liz Gilbert had provided backing vocals on various albums.
