= Luminate (company) =

Tracking system for music and music video sales

Luminate Data, LLC
- Type: Private
- Industry: Music and Entertainment data
- Founded: 1991; 35 years ago
- Founders: Mike Fine; Mike Shalett
- Headquarters: Los Angeles, California
- Key people: Rob Jonas (CEO)
- Owner: Eldridge Industries and Penske Media Corporation
- Website: luminatedata.com

Luminate Data, LLC (formerly MRC Data and P-MRC Data) is a provider of music and entertainment data. It was established in 2020 as a joint venture, by Nielsen Music, Alpha Data (formerly BuzzAngle Music), and Variety Business Intelligence (formerly TVtracker).

In December 2019, Eldridge Industries' Valence Media, then parent company of Billboard, had acquired Nielsen's music data business, thus reuniting it with Billboard after it had been spun off to E5 Global Media from Nielsen Business Media. In 2020, Eldridge merged Valence into the film and television studio MRC, and then (as P-MRC Data) into its PMRC joint venture with Penske Media Corporation. P-MRC Data was renamed Luminate Data in March 2022. In August 2022, the MRC merger was unwound, with Eldridge Industries taking sole ownership of its stake in PMRC.

== Nielsen Music ==
Nielsen Music, originally established by Mike Fine and Mike Shalett in 1991, collects music consumption and sales weekly and makes this available every Sunday (for album sales) and every Monday (for song sales) to subscribers, which include record companies, publishing firms, music retailers, independent promoters, film and TV companies, and artist managers. It is the source of sales information for the Billboard music charts. The company operates the analytics platform Music Connect, Music 360 and Broadcast Data Systems (which tracks airplay of music), the latter of which was shut down in September 2022.

Nielsen SoundScan began tracking sales data for Nielsen on March 1, 1991. The May 25 issue of Billboard published Billboard 200 and Country Album charts based on SoundScan "piece count data", and the first Hot 100 chart to debut with the system was released on November 30, 1991. Previously, Billboard tracked sales by calling stores across the U.S. and asking about sales—a method that was inherently error-prone and open to outright fraud. Indeed, while transitioning from the calling to tracking methods, the airplay and sales charts (already monitored by Nielsen) and the Hot 100 (then still using the calling system) often did not match (for instance Paula Abdul's "The Promise of a New Day" and Roxette's "Fading Like a Flower" reached much higher Hot 100 peaks than their actual sales and airplay would have allowed them to). Although most record company executives conceded that the new method was far more accurate than the old, the chart's volatility and its geographical balance initially caused deep concern, before the change and the market shifts it brought about were accepted across the industry. Tower Records, the country's second-largest retail chain, was originally not included in the sample because its stores were equipped with different technology to measure sales. At first, some industry executives complained that the new system—which relied on high-tech sales measurement rather than store employee estimates—was based on an inadequate sample, one that favored established and mainstream acts over newcomers.

The Recording Industry Association of America also tracks sales (or more specifically, shipments minus potential returns) on a long-term basis through the RIAA certification system; it has never used either Nielsen SoundScan or the store-calling method.

The first Billboard Hot 100 number-one song via Nielsen SoundScan was "Set Adrift on Memory Bliss" by P.M. Dawn.

Other changes would also largely impact the Hot 100 in the future, consisting of radio-only songs being able to chart in 1998, and YouTube views playing part of how a Hot 100 is decided in 2013.

Sales data from cash registers is collected from 14,000 retail, mass merchant, and non-traditional (on-line stores, venues, digital music services, etc.) outlets in the United States, Canada, UK and Japan.

The requirements for reporting sales to Nielsen Music are that the store has Internet access and a point of sale (POS) inventory system. Submission of sales data must be in the form of a text file consisting of all the UPCs sold and the quantities per UPC on a weekly basis. Sales collected from Monday–Sunday or Sunday–Saturday are reported every Monday and made available to subscribers every Wednesday. Anyone selling a music product with its own UPC or ISRC may register that product to be tracked by Luminate.

Not all retailers participate in the SoundScan program, so total CD sales are projected from the collected data using a statistical calculation called "weighting". This assigns a multiplier to each category of stores, to compensate for the number of similar stores not covered by the sampling program. Sales in each category are multiplied accordingly.

Such a system is vulnerable to exploitation if it is known which stores are included in the sampling program. To inflate their reported chart sales, some indie labels were reported to purposefully target stores in the program for on-site sales promotions. Also, other labels were found shipping boxes of their CDs to be scanned by complicit retailers in the program.

The incorporation of SoundScan tracking by the Billboard charting system was cited by the industry as a possible cause of the early '90s popularization of alternative music in the United States. An explanation floated was that the previous call system under-represented marginal genres. Under SoundScan, more accurate data on alternative music sales allowed these acts to appear higher in the Billboard charts than before, and their chart success helped increase the genre's popularity. In addition, SoundScan sales data quickly found use in the promotion departments at major record labels, to persuade radio station music directors to play tracks by high-selling alternative artists such as Nirvana.

== Alpha Data ==
Alpha Data (formerly, but commonly known as BuzzAngle Music) was a music analytics firm which provided statistics for the music industry, including record sales and music streaming.

== TVtracker ==
TVtracker, founded in 1999 by Mark Hoebich, tracks and analyzes all aspects of U.S. filmed entertainment, including television, feature film and digital entertainment, with coverage of everything from pilot pickups and series orders to motion picture development and post-production. The company evolved into Variety Business Intelligence and operates as Luminate Film & TV.

== See also ==
- Album era
- Music recording certification
- List of best-selling albums in the United States of the Nielsen SoundScan era
- List of number-one Billboard Blues Albums of the 1990s
- DigiListan – Swedish radio programme using Nielsen SoundScan to create its statistics
