= Blue on Black =

1998 single by Kenny Wayne Shepherd Band

Single by Kenny Wayne Shepherd Band

from the album Trouble Is...
- B-side: "Blue on Black" (The Road Mix); "Voodoo Child"
- Released: April 7, 1998
- Genre: Southern rock; blues; alternative country
- Length: 5:30
- Label: Revolution; Giant; Warner Bros.
- Songwriters: Kenny Wayne Shepherd; Mark Selby; Tia Sillers
- Producer: Jerry Harrison

Kenny Wayne Shepherd Band singles chronology
| "Somehow, Somewhere, Someway" (1998) | "Blue on Black" (1998) | "Everything Is Broken" (1998) |

Music video
- "Blue on Black" on YouTube

"Blue on Black" is a song by American blues rock group Kenny Wayne Shepherd Band. Written by Shepherd with Mark Selby and Tia Sillers, it was originally released on their second studio album, Trouble Is... (1997). In 1998, the song was released as a single and reached the top position on the US Billboard Mainstream Rock Tracks chart, becoming that chart's most successful song of 1998. It has since been regarded as the best rock song of 1998 by various media, including winning the Billboard Music Award for "Rock Track of the Year".

In 2019, Shepherd teamed up with American heavy metal band Five Finger Death Punch, along with country singer Brantley Gilbert and Queen guitarist Brian May for a reworked version of "Blue on Black". It also performed well on the record charts and proceeds were donated to the Gary Sinise Foundation to benefit first responders.

== Composition ==
In an August 2017 interview, Shepherd discussed the song's origins:

We wrote that when we were down in New Orleans – me, Mark and Tia. I had the music, and Mark and I were just rolling with the music and tried to develop things up. Tia came up with this idea based on a shirt that I was wearing that was blue and black. She noticed the two colors that were dominant on my shirt, and if you mix those two colors together, black consumes the blue. It doesn't amount to anything if you put the two together: You still have one color, instead of creating a new color. So she built on that idea, and it became this really deep song. It's really up to the listener to determine how they apply it. So many people have applied it to a death in the family, an abusive relationship, a broken relationship, or whatever. There are so many different ways. That's what's beautiful about music and lyrics is trying to write a song that the listener can apply to their own experience in whatever way seems fit. And that's one of those songs.

== Charts and recognition ==
Shepherd discussed the song's commercial significance in an interview:

The success at rock radio that we had early in my career, with 'Blue on Black,' I think we set a record. When that song was out, it definitely helped expose my music to a wider audience, and also, by gaining that exposure, then I get to turn a lot of those people on to the blues who may not have listened to the blues otherwise.

"Blue on Black" reached number 78 on the US Billboard Hot 100 and peaked atop the magazine's Mainstream Rock Tracks chart for six weeks, ending 1998 as the most successful mainstream rock song. The song also charted in Canada, where it peaked at number 47 on the RPM 100 Hit Tracks chart and number two on the RPM Alternative 30. A review in Billboard described the song as a "widely appealing meld of brooding southern rock, searing blues guitar and alt-country touches".

In honor of the hit single, the Martin Guitar Company issued its Kenny Wayne Shepherd Limited Edition Signature model JC-16KWS, a distinct jumbo model in dark blue, in January 2001. The guitar design was inspired by the imagery evoked in the song's lyrics. Proceeds from the model were to be donated to Providence House, a Shreveport, Louisiana shelter and development program for homeless families with children.

== Performance and personnel ==
As Shepherd's signature song, he often closes his concert performances with "Blue on Black", just prior to "Voodoo Child". The Jimi Hendrix cover was also included on the CD single with an alternate mix of "Blue on Black".

- Kenny Wayne Shepherd – lead guitar
- Noah Hunt – lead vocals
- Joe Nadaeu – rhythm guitar
- Jimmy Wallace – keyboards
- Robby Emerson – bass guitar
- Sam Bryant – drums, percussion

== Charts ==
=== Weekly charts ===
| Chart (1998) | Peak position |
|---|---|
| Canada Top Singles (RPM) | 47 |
| Canada Rock/Alternative (RPM) | 2 |
| US Billboard Hot 100 | 78 |
| US Adult Alternative Airplay (Billboard) | 8 |
| US Mainstream Rock Airplay (Billboard) | 1 |

=== Year-end charts ===
| Chart (1998) | Position |
|---|---|
| US Mainstream Rock Tracks (Billboard) | 1 |
| US Triple-A (Billboard) | 23 |

== Certifications ==
| Region | Certification | Certified units/sales |
|---|---|---|
| United States (RIAA) | Platinum | 1,000,000^{‡} |
^{‡} Sales+streaming figures based on certification alone.

== Five Finger Death Punch version ==
"Blue on Black"
- Cover art for the collaboration version.

Single by Five Finger Death Punch featuring Kenny Wayne Shepherd, Brantley Gilbert, and Brian May

from the album And Justice for None
- Released: April 12, 2019
- Genre: Hard rock; blues rock
- Length: 4:34
- Label: Prospect Park
- Songwriters: Kenny Wayne Shepherd; Mark Selby; Tia Sillers

Five Finger Death Punch singles chronology
| "When the Seasons Change" (2018) | "Blue on Black" (2019) | "Inside Out" (2019) |

Kenny Wayne Shepherd singles chronology
| "You Can't Judge a Book By the Cover" (2014) | "Blue on Black" (2019) | "Christmas Must Be Tonight" (2020) |

Brantley Gilbert singles chronology
| "What Happens in a Small Town" (2019) | "Blue on Black" (2019) | "Fire't Up" (2019) |

Brian May singles chronology
| "One Voice" (2016) | "Blue on Black" (2019) | "One Beautiful Christmas Day" (2020) |

Music video
- "Blue on Black" on YouTube

American heavy metal band Five Finger Death Punch recorded "Blue on Black" for their 2018 album And Justice for None. However, on April 12, 2019, a version different to the one on that album, was released as a single, together with Kenny Shepherd, country musician Brantley Gilbert and Queen guitarist Brian May. It merged Sheperd's blues rock, Gilbert's country, May's classic rock and Five Finger Death Punch's mainstream rock styles.

An official music video was released on April 11, 2019. Proceeds from the song were donated to the Gary Sinise Foundation to benefit first responders. This version debuted and peaked at No. 2 on the US Digital Song Sales chart and No. 66 on the Billboard Hot 100, marking Five Finger Death Punch's first visit to the latter list since 2011 and also became the band's record-extending tenth Hard Rock Digital Song Sales No. 1. It also topped the Billboard Mainstream Rock Songs chart for five non-consecutive weeks.

=== Personnel ===
- Ivan Moody – co-lead vocals
- Jason Hook – lead guitar, backing vocals
- Zoltan Bathory – rhythm guitar
- Chris Kael – bass guitar, backing vocals
- Jeremy Spencer – drums, percussion
- Brantley Gilbert – co-lead vocals
- Kenny Wayne Shepherd – first guitar solo, backing vocals
- Brian May – second guitar solo

=== Certifications ===
| Region | Certification | Certified units/sales |
|---|---|---|
| United States (RIAA) | Platinum | 1,000,000^{‡} |
| United States (RIAA) Remix with Kenny Wayne Shepherd, Brantley Gilbert, and Brian May | Platinum | 1,000,000^{‡} |
^{‡} Sales+streaming figures based on certification alone.

== See also ==
- List of Billboard Mainstream Rock number-one songs of the 1990s
