= The Place You're In =

Studio album by Kenny Wayne Shepherd
- Released: October 5, 2004
- Genre: Hard rock
- Length: 44:37
- Label: Reprise
- Producer: Marti Frederiksen

Kenny Wayne Shepherd chronology
Live On (1999)	The Place You're In (2004)	10 Days Out: Blues from the Backroads (2007)

Singles from The Place You're In
- 1. "Alive" Released: 2004; 2. "The Place You're In" Released: 2005

Professional ratings
Review scores
Source	Rating
Allmusic	4/5 stars

The Place You're In is the fourth studio album by American blues rock musician Kenny Wayne Shepherd. It was released on October 5, 2004, by Reprise Records. It was his first album since 1999's Live On.

== Track listing ==
All tracks written by Kenny Wayne Shepherd and Marti Frederiksen, except where noted

1. "Alive" – 3:44
2. "Be Mine" – 4:09
3. "Spank" (with Kid Rock) (Kenny Wayne Shepherd, Jamie Houston, Kid Rock) – 3:01
4. "Let Go" – 5:02
5. "Ain't Selling Out" – 3:15
6. "Believe" (with Noah Hunt) (Kenny Wayne Shepherd, Noah Hunt, Marti Frederiksen) – 3:58
7. "The Place You're In" (Kenny Wayne Shepherd, Marti Frederiksen, Mikal Reid) – 3:22
8. "Hey, What Do You Say" – 5:03
9. "Get It Together" – 3:48
10. "Burdens" (with Noah Hunt) – 3:39
11. "A Little Bit More" (Instrumental) – 3:05

== Credits ==
- Kenny Wayne Shepherd - guitars, vocals
- Marti Frederiksen - bass
- Brian Tichy - drums

== Charts ==
Chart performance for The Place You're In
Chart (2004)	Peak position
US Billboard 200	101
