= Blowing My Mind =

Studio album by Barry Goldberg
- Released: 1966
- Genres: pop, rock, blues
- Label: Epic
- Producer: Billy Sherrill

Barry Goldberg chronology
Blowing My Mind (1966)	There's No Hole in My Soul (1968)

Blowing My Mind is the first album by the Barry Goldberg Blues Band. It was released in 1966.

== Critical reception ==
Professional ratings
Review scores
Source	Rating
Allmusic	4/5 stars

On AllMusic Lindsay Planer wrote, "After [Steve] Miller split to the Bay Area to form his own blues band, Goldberg and the remnants of the short-lived Goldberg-Miller union headed to Music City U.S.A. to cut Blowing My Mind (1966) . Joining Goldberg were several up-and-coming notables, including Charlie Musselwhite (harmonica), Harvey Mandel (guitar), Roy Ruby (bass), and Maurice McKinley (drums). This quintet drives through a blend of high-energy originals as well as an interesting combination of equally commanding cover tunes."

== Track listing ==
Side 1

1. "Gettin' It Down" (Barry Goldberg)
2. "Mean Old World" (Goldberg)
3. "Twice a Man" (Goldberg)
4. "Whole Lotta Shakin' Going On" (Dave Williams, Sunny David)
5. "Big Boss Man" (Al Smith, Luther Dixon)

Side 2

1. "Blowing My Mind" (Goldberg, Roy Ruby)
2. "That'll Be the Day" (Buddy Holly, Jerry Allison, Norman Petty)
3. "Can't Stand to See You Go" (Jimmy Reed)
4. "Put Me Down" (Goldberg, Roy Ruby)
5. "Think" (Deadric Malone, Jimmy McCracklin)

Bonus track, 1998 CD reissue

11. "Ginger Man" (Geoff Muldaur)

== Personnel ==
Barry Goldberg Blues Band

- Barry Goldberg – vocals, organ
- Charlie Musselwhite – harmonica
- Harvey Mandel – lead guitar
- Roy Ruby – bass guitar
- Maurice McKinley – drums

Production

- Billy Sherrill – producer
