= Can't Get Enough (The Rides album) =

Studio album by The Rides
- Released: August 27, 2013
- Recorded: EastWest Studios (Hollywood, California)
- Genre: Blues rock
- Length: 49:10
- Labels: Provogue (Europe); 429 Records (US)
- Producers: Jerry Harrison, Stephen Stills, Kenny Wayne Shepherd

The Rides chronology
Can't Get Enough (2013)	Pierced Arrow (2016)

Stephen Stills chronology
Carry On (2013)	Can't Get Enough (2013)	Pierced Arrow (2016)

Can't Get Enough is the debut album by The Rides, a band consisting of Stephen Stills, Kenny Wayne Shepherd and Barry Goldberg. It was released in 2013.

== Track listing ==
All tracks are written by Stephen Stills, Kenny Wayne Shepherd, and Barry Goldberg except where indicated.

Side one
No.	Title	Writer(s)	Length
1.	"Roadhouse"		3:02
2.	"That's a Pretty Good Love"	Bryant Lucas, Fred Mendelsohn	2:51
3.	"Don't Want Lies"		4;41
4.	"Search and Destroy"	Iggy Pop, James Williamson	2:28
5.	"Can't Get Enough"		6:13

Side two
No.	Title	Writer(s)	Length
1.	"Honey Bee"	Muddy Waters	7:17
2.	"Rockin' in the Free World"	Frank Sampedro, Neil Young	6:09
3.	"Talk to Me Baby"	Elmore James	3:46
4.	"Only Teardrops Fall"		4:43
5.	"Word Game"	Stephen Stills	4:46
Total length:			49:10

== Personnel ==
The Rides

- Stephen Stills – vocals, guitars
- Kenny Wayne Shepherd – vocals, guitars
- Barry Goldberg – keyboards

Additional musicians

- Kevin McCormick – bass
- Chris Layton – drums
- Luis Conte – percussion
- Alethea Mills – backing vocals
- Chavonne Stewart – backing vocals

== Production ==
- Jerry Harrison – producer
- John Hiler – engineer
- Wil Anspach – assistant engineer
- Brendan Dekora – assistant engineer
- Ben O'Neil – assistant engineer
- Eric "ET" Thorngren – mixing
- Bernie Grundman – mastering at Bernie Grundman Mastering (Hollywood, California)
- Stu Fine – A&R
- Gary Burden – art direction, design
- Jenice Heo – art direction
- Eleanor Stills – photography
- Kelly Muchoney Johnson – business management
- Elliot Roberts, Kristin Forbes and Ken Shepherd – personal management
