= Busted Flat Records =

Record label in Ontario

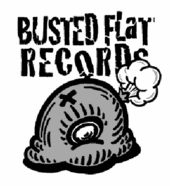
- Parent company: Busted Flat Records
- Founded: 2002
- Founder: Mark Logan, owner of Encore Records and co-founder, Jnana Records
- Distributor(s): F>A>B> Distribution, Encore (Kitchener, Canada)
- Genre: Roots, folk, blues, Americana, rock, alt-country
- Country of origin: Canada
- Official website: www.bustedflatrecords.com

Busted Flat Records is Ontario-based independent record label, founded in 2002.

== History ==
Mark Logan, the owner of a vinyl music store in Kitchener, Encore Records, started Busted Flat Records in 2002 to record and release a live album by Shannon Lyon. The label is currently based in Kitchener, Canada and as of 2013, has 24 artists with over 65 released recordings.

Musicians on the roster include/have included blues artist, Matt Andersen (two-time Maple Blues Awards winner, recipient of the Best Solo performance at the International Blues Challenge, and winner of several East Coast Music Awards), as well as Paul MacLeod, Brock Zeman, Lynn Jackson, Ambre McLean, Shannon Lyon, Jay Semko, the Billie Hollies and many other Canadian singer-songwriters.

The label name was taken from a line in the song, "Me and Bobby McGee" made popular by Janis Joplin. The label was founded to showcase talent from the Southern Ontario region, but has since branched out to release acts from across Canada and Europe. The label specializes in roots, Americana, blues, folk and alt-country acts.

According to a feature article in Exclaim! magazine, Busted Flat Records operates on a business model that favours the independent artist, with approximately "75 percent of the profits going to artists, 15 percent paying for production and roughly ten percent going to the label." In a recent (2011) review, Busted Flat Records was named "one of the most respected roots music outlets in the country."

In 2013, the label distributed its first release by an American artist: Have Harmony, Will Travel, a collection of duets by Carla Olson, who had previously co-founded The Textones. The album includes contributions from Barry Goldberg, Cindy Cashdollar, Scott Kempner, Rob Waller from I See Hawks in L.A., Juice Newton, Richie Furay, John York, Peter Case, James Intveld and Scott Kempner.

== See also ==
- Music of Canada
- Music in Canada
- List of record labels
