= Pierced Arrow =

Studio album by the Rides
- Released: 6 May 2016
- Studios: EastWest Studios (Hollywood, California)
- Genre: Blues rock
- Length: 45:31
- Labels: Provogue (Europe); 429 Records (US)
- Producers: Stephen Stills, Kenny Wayne Shepherd, Barry Goldberg and Kevin McCormick

The Rides chronology
Can't Get Enough (2013)	Pierced Arrow (2016)

Stephen Stills chronology
Can't Get Enough (2013)	Pierced Arrow (2016)	Everybody Knows (2017)

Pierced Arrow is the second album by the Rides, a band consisting of Stephen Stills, Kenny Wayne Shepherd, and Barry Goldberg. It was released in 2016.

Pierced Arrow is the band's most recent album to date, and also the last one to feature Goldberg, who died in 2025.

== Track listing ==
All tracks are written by Stephen Stills, Kenny Wayne Shepherd, Barry Goldberg and Kevin McCormick except where indicated.

Side one
No.	Title	Writer(s)	Length
1.	"Kick Out Of It"	Stills, Shepherd, Goldberg	4:46
2.	"Riva Diva"		3:22
3.	"Virtual World"		4:01
4.	"By My Side"	Shepherd, Goldberg	5:15
5.	"I've Got To Use My Imagination"	Goldberg, Gerry Goffin	6:16

Side two
No.	Title	Writer(s)	Length
1.	"Mr. Policeman"		4:05
2.	"Game On"		4:05
3.	"I Need Your Lovin'"	Shepherd, Goldberg	4:57
4.	"There Was A Place"		4:41
5.	"My Babe"	Willie Dixon	4:03
Total length:			45:32

== Personnel ==
The Rides

- Stephen Stills – vocals, guitars
- Kenny Wayne Shepherd – vocals, guitars
- Barry Goldberg – keyboards

Additional musicians

- Kevin McCormick – bass
- Chris Layton – drums
- Kim Wilson – harmonica
- Raven Johnson – backing vocals
- Stephanie Sprull – backing vocals

== Production ==
- Barry Goldberg – producer
- Kenny Wayne Shepherd – producer
- Stephen Stills – producer, cover artwork, layout, illustration
- Kevin McCormick – producer
- Ed Cherney – engineer, recording, mixing
- Jeremy Miller – assistant engineer
- Bernie Grundman – mastering at Bernie Grundman Mastering (Hollywood, California)
- Stu Fine – A&R
- David Alan Kogut – package art
- West Coast Customs – layout, illustration
- Eleanor Stills – photography
- Kelly Muchoney Johnson – business management
- Elliot Roberts – management (for Barry Goldberg and Stephen Stills)
- Kristin Forbes and Ken Shepherd – management (for Kenny Wayne Shepherd)
