= Paramount Plaza Walk of Fame =

Walk of Fame honoring artists who recorded for Paramount Records in Grafton, Wisconsin

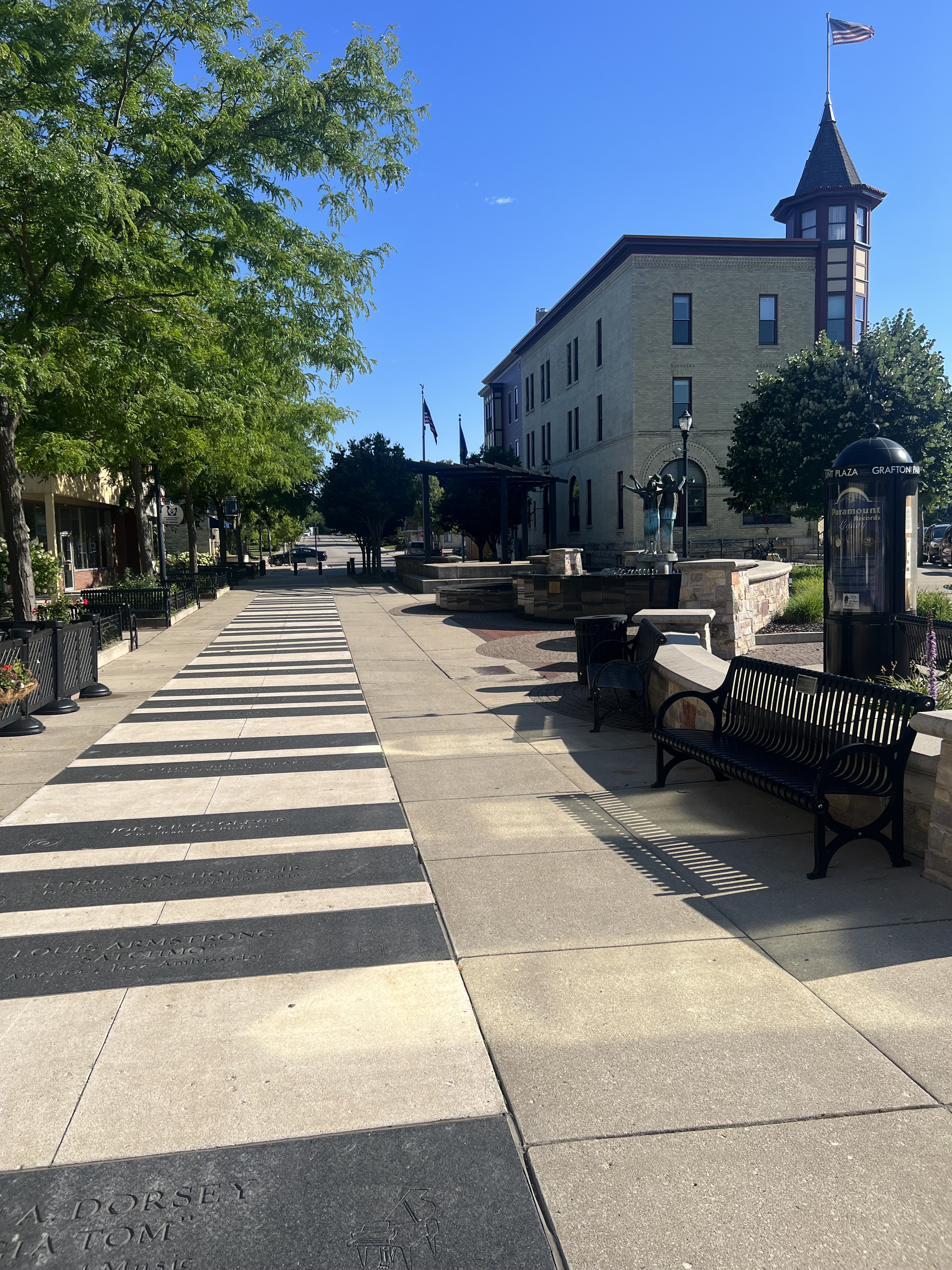
- Established: 2006
- Location: Wisconsin
- Coordinates: 43.318125°N 87.951665°W

The Paramount Plaza Walk of Fame honors artists who recorded for Paramount Records in Grafton, Wisconsin with a 'piano key'.

The first of a total of 44 'piano keys' is 2 feet (0.61 m) wide by 7 feet (2.1 m) long and made of black granite to resemble a keyboard. Annually, additional keys – placed by the Village of Grafton – will be inscribed with the names of artists who recorded for Paramount Records.

Starting in 2006, the first inductees chosen by the Paramount GIG ('Grooves In Grafton') organization, in Grafton, were Charley Patton, Ma Rainey, Blind Lemon Jefferson, Skip James, Thomas Dorsey, and Henry Townsend.
