= Brock Zeman =

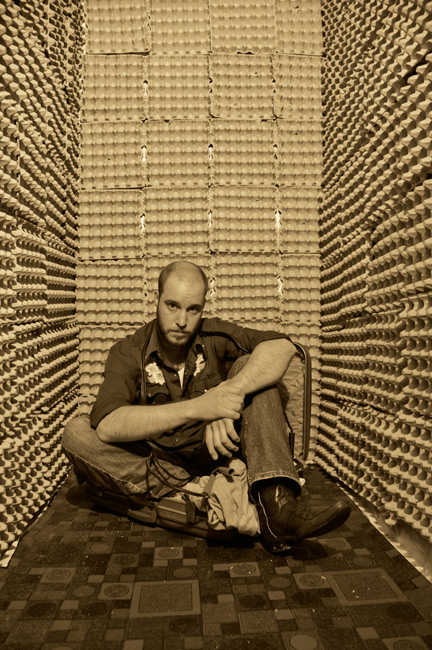

Background information
- Born: 1981 (age 43–44)
- Origin: Canada
- Genres: Roots; Americana
- Occupation(s): Singer-songwriter, producer
- Years active: 2000–present
- Labels: Busted Flat Records and Mud Records
- Website: Brock Zeman

Brock Adam Zeman is a singer-songwriter from the Ottawa Valley based in Carleton Place, Ontario, Canada. He has released twelve albums and a live DVD/digital audio release called The Pinball Sessions. He is known as a prolific performer having given more than two hundred live performances across North America every year for the last decade.

Before his mid-20s, Zeman had signed with indie label, Busted Flat Records, had played most major music festivals in Canada and performed on stage with some of the top talent of the contemporary roots and Americana scenes, including Steve Earle, Lynn Miles, Fred Eaglesmith, Corb Lund, Toby Keith, Prairie Oyster, and Blackie & the Rodeo Kings.

Exclaim! magazine calls Zeman "a songwriter worth hearing over and over again" while CKUA hails Zeman's work as "intelligent, tuneful, heart-felt songs served up with an authentic but understated style." The Waterloo Region Record says that "Zeman doesn't surrender an inch to any Texas singer-songwriter you care to name. Closer to home, he has the chops to join the likes of Fred Eaglesmith on the lonesome outskirts of town after the street lights come on."

Zeman has taken a new direction and founded Mud Records (2011), his signature label for releasing his own material and the imprint for showcasing emerging roots talent in Canada, including albums by Robert Larisey and Brothers Through the Hill, which Zeman also produced. The Ottawa Citizen says that Zeman "recognizes talent when he sees it" and Rootstime named Mud Records "a promising young label."

== Discography ==
- The Carnival is Back in Town (Busted Flat Records, 2017)
- The Pinball Sessions (Live DVD and digital audio release) (2016)
- Pulling your Sword out of the Devil's Back (Busted Flat Records, 2015)
- Rotten Tooth (Busted Flat Records, 2013)
- Me Then You (Busted Flat/Mud Records 2012)
- Ya Ain't Crazy Henny Penny (Mud Records, 2011)
- Live @ the Acoustic Grill (Acoustic Grill Records, 2008)
- $100 Difference (Busted Flat Records, 2008)
- The Bourbon Sessions (Busted Flat Records, 2007)
- Welcome Home Ivy Jane (Busted Flat Records, 2006)
- Brock Zeman and the Dirty Hands (Busted Flat Records, 2005)
- Songs from the Mud (Busted Flat Records, 2005)
- Cold Winter Comes Back (Busted Flat Records, 2003)

== See also ==
- Music of Canada
