= Barry Goldberg =

American musical artist (1942–2025)

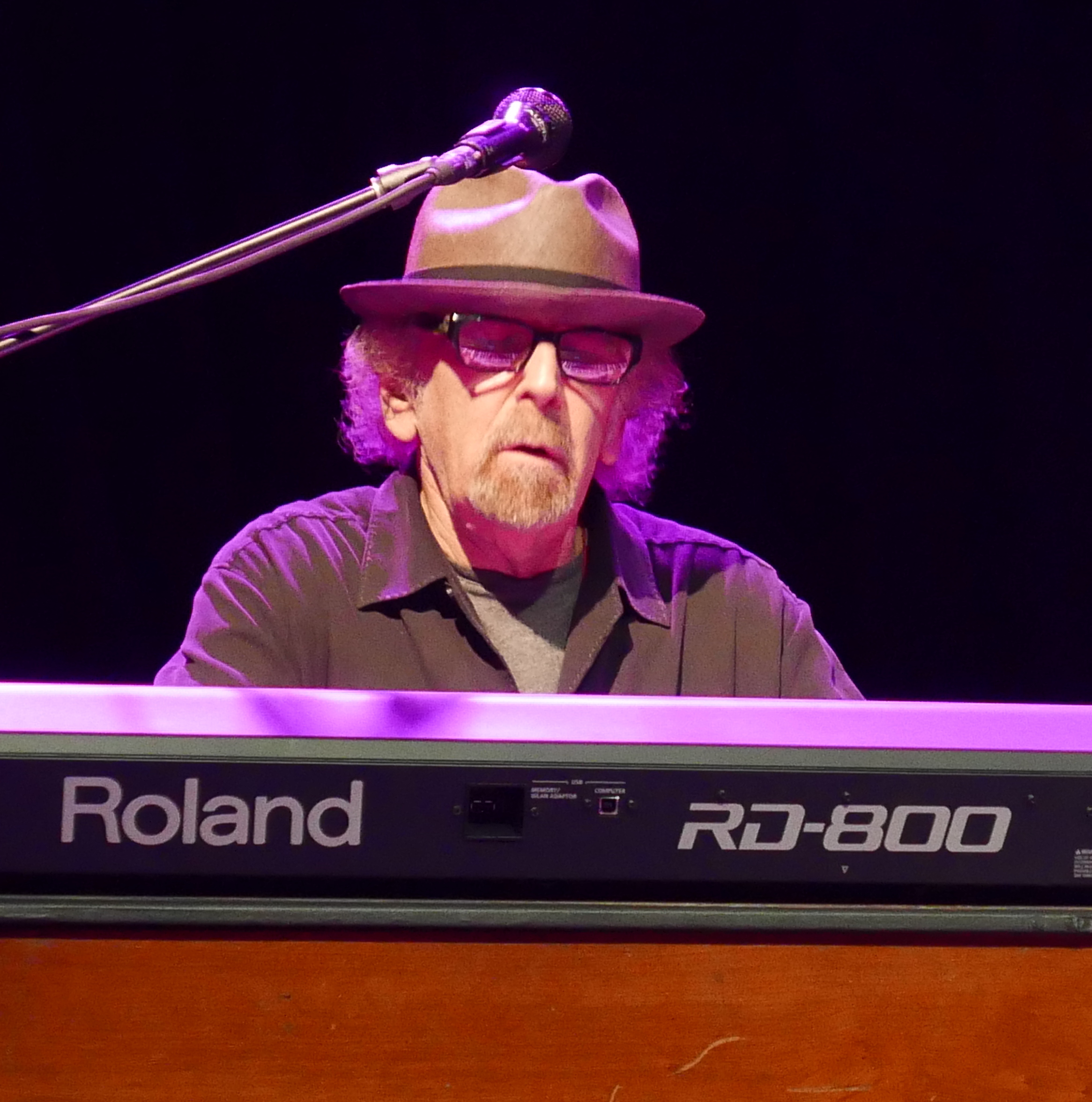
- Goldberg in 2016

Background information
- Born: December 25, 1941; Chicago, Illinois, U.S.
- Died: January 22, 2025 (aged 83) Los Angeles, California, U.S.
- Genres: Rock; blues
- Occupations: Musician; songwriter; producer
- Instrument: Keyboards
- Years active: 1964–2021
- Formerly of: The Electric Flag; The Rides

Barry Joseph Goldberg (December 25, 1941 – January 22, 2025) was an American blues and rock keyboardist, songwriter, and record producer. Goldberg co-produced albums by Percy Sledge, Charlie Musselwhite, James Cotton, and the Textones, plus Bob Dylan's version of Curtis Mayfield's "People Get Ready".

== Career ==
=== 1950s–1970s ===
As a teenager in Chicago, Goldberg sat in with Muddy Waters, Otis Rush, and Howlin' Wolf. He played keyboards with the Paul Butterfield Blues Band backing Bob Dylan during his 1965 newly 'electrified' appearance at the Newport Folk Festival. He formed The Electric Flag with Mike Bloomfield in 1967, and formed the Barry Goldberg Reunion in 1968.

In 1965, after moving to Chicago to play the blues, Steve Miller and Goldberg founded the Goldberg-Miller Blues Band, along with bassist Roy Ruby, rhythm guitarist Craymore Stevens, and drummer Maurice McKinley. The band contracted to Epic Records and recorded a single, "The Mother Song", which they performed on Hullabaloo, before Miller left the group to go to San Francisco.

Goldberg's songs (some co-written with Gerry Goffin) have been recorded by many musicians, including Rod Stewart, Gladys Knight, Joe Cocker, Steve Miller, Bobby "Blue" Bland, Gram Parsons and B. J. Thomas.

Goldberg's first professional recording session was "Devil with a Blue Dress On"/"Good Golly Miss Molly" by Mitch Ryder & the Detroit Wheels. Among the albums he contributed to are Leonard Cohen's Death of a Ladies' Man, the Ramones' End of the Century, The Flying Burrito Brothers' The Gilded Palace of Sin, and Super Session, which featured Michael Bloomfield, Stephen Stills, and Al Kooper.

Goldberg's self-titled album was released in 1974, and was produced by Bob Dylan and Jerry Wexler.

=== 1990s–2000s ===
In 1992 he played keyboards with the Carla Olson & Mick Taylor band, which resulted in the live CD Too Hot for Snakes, featuring Ian McLagan, Jesse Sublett and John "Juke" Logan.

In 1994, Goldberg and Saul Davis produced Blue Night by Percy Sledge, which featured Bobby Womack, Steve Cropper, Mick Taylor, Greg Leisz, Bob Glaub, Ed Greene, and Mikael Rickfors, with songs written by Rickfors, Gregg Sutton, Pat Robinson, Carla Olson, the Bee Gees, Quinton Claunch, Fats Domino, and Otis Redding. The album was Grammy nominated and the WC Handy soul album of the year.

By 1999, Goldberg both wrote and performed the theme to the Disney Channel original movie Smart House, entitled "The House is Jumpin'", with Phil Shenale and Sterling Smith, with vocals by Chan André. He wrote the song with Jill Wisoff and Joel Diamond.

In 2002, he was featured on the Bo Diddley tribute album Hey Bo Diddley – A Tribute!, playing piano on the songs "Pills", "I'm A Man" and "Before You Accuse Me" (produced by Carla Olson). Carla also produced Barry's Stoned Again album, which featured Denny Freeman, Mick Taylor and Ernie Watts.

In 2004, Shining Through The Rain by Percy Sledge was co-produced by Davis and Goldberg, featuring Larry Byrom, Denny Freeman, Clayton Ivey, Ed Greene, Phil Upchurch, Bob Glaub, the Waters, and Jakob Dylan, and songs by the Bee Gees, Mikael Rickfors, Carla Olson, Jackie Lomax, Earl Carson, Bobby Moore.

In 2005–2006, he toured with the Chicago Blues Reunion featuring Nick Gravenites, Harvey Mandel, Tracy Nelson and Corky Siegel. Their debut CD reached No. 2 on the Billboard Blues Chart and received a four-star review from Rolling Stone magazine's David Fricke.

=== 2010 to 2021 ===
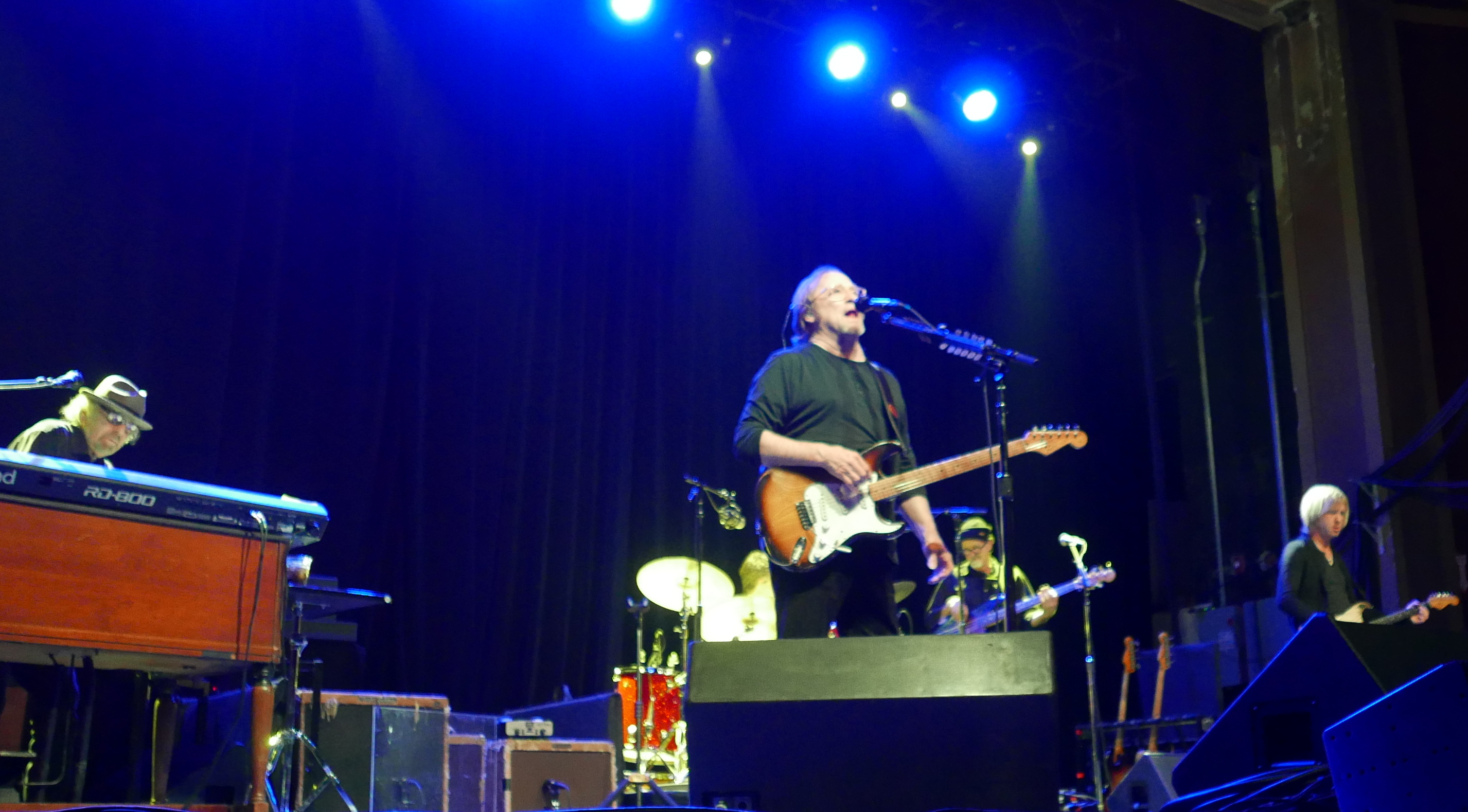
Goldberg, left, performing with the Rides

In 2012, Stephen Stills recruited Goldberg in founding a new band dubbed the Rides, culling some of Stills's best work from the past, adding guitarist Kenny Wayne Shepherd and session drummer Chris Layton. Goldberg co-wrote four songs on their first album, titled Can't Get Enough, released that year. The feature track is "Word Game". Much of the album reflects the work Stills did on the Super Session album with Mike Bloomfield in 1968. The album was nominated for a 2014 Blues Music Award for Best Rock Blues Album.

Goldberg appears on the Carla Olson album Have Harmony, Will Travel (released April 15, 2013, on Busted Flat Records) playing Hammond B3 organ on Del Shannon's "Keep Searchin'" sung by Carla and Peter Case, and piano and organ on the Little Steven song "All I Needed Was You", sung by Scott Kempner (The Del-Lords).

The Born in Chicago documenting Chicago blues was released in 2013, premiering at the SXSW Film Festival in March. Goldberg had been working on this project for a few years. It includes unique contributions by Bob Dylan, B. B. King, Buddy Guy, Hubert Sumlin, Eric Burdon, and many others.

Goldberg produced three tracks on the 2013 EP (Drown in the Crimson Tide) by The Voice Season One semi-finalist Nakia with longtime friend Johnny Lee Schell.

In 2016, the Rides played with Neil Young at the Pantages Theater in Los Angeles at the Light Up the Blues event. The band later the same year released their second album, Pierced Arrow.

Goldberg produced and composed additional musical score to the documentary feature film BANG! The Bert Berns Story, which premiered at SXSW in 2016 and was released theatrically in 2017.

His latest CD, In the Groove, was released on June 15, 2018, on Sunset Blvd Records. The album consists of new and classic instrumentals, and features Goldberg on Hammond B3 organ, piano and Wurlitzer piano. Among the featured musicians and guests is jazz pianist Les McCann. The album was produced by Carla Olson.

Goldberg appears on the RENEW / BMG album Americana Railroad, released November 26, 2021, backing Rocky Burnette and James Intveld.

== Personal life and death ==
Goldberg was born in Chicago on December 25, 1941. Goldberg was a nephew of Arthur Goldberg, a prominent Chicago-based labor attorney who served as the United States Secretary of Labor (1961–1962) and as an Associate Justice of the Supreme Court of the United States (1962–1965) before returning to the Cabinet of the United States as United States Ambassador to the United Nations (1965–1968).

Goldberg died in Los Angeles on January 22, 2025, at age 83, due to complications from non-Hodgkin's lymphoma.

== Discography ==
=== Albums ===
- 1966: Blowing My Mind (Epic LP: BN-26199)
- 1967: The Trip: Original Motion Picture Soundtrack (Sidewalk LP: ST-5908) – The Electric Flag
- 1968: A Long Time Comin' (Columbia LP: CS-9597) – The Electric Flag
- 1968: There's No Hole in My Soul (Buddah LP: BDS-5012)
- 1969: Two Jews Blues (Buddah LP: BDS-5029) – with Mike Bloomfield
- 1969: Street Man (Buddah LP: BDS-5051)
- 1972: Barry Goldberg and Friends (Record Man/Cherry Red LP: CR-5015)
- 1974: The Band Kept Playing (Atlantic LP: SD-18112) – The Electric Flag
- 1974: Barry Goldberg (Atco LP: SD-7040)
- 1976: Barry Goldberg & Friends Recorded Live (Buddah LP: BDS-5684)
- 2002: Stoned Again (Antone's/Texas Music Group CD: ANT-0058)
- 2013: Can't Get Enough (429 Records CD: FTN-17940) – The Rides
- 2016: Pierced Arrow (429 Records CD: FTN-16054) – The Rides
- 2018: In the Groove (Sunset Blvd Records CD: SBR-7931)
- 2025: Chicago to L.A. (Sunset Blvd Records)

=== Miscellaneous ===
- Some 1960s session work appears on the re-release of John P. Hammond's So Many Roads
- 1970: Ivar Avenue Reunion (RCA LP: LSP-4442) as Ivar Avenue Reunion, with Neil Merryweather, Lynn Carey, Charlie Musselwhite
- 1971: Blasts From My Past (Buddah LP: BDS-5081) compilation of There's No Hole in My Soul and Two Jews Blues
- 2005: Chicago Blues Reunion: Buried Alive in the Blues (Out of the Box Records 3016) with Nick Gravenites, Harvey Mandel, Tracy Nelson, Sam Lay, Corky Siegel
- 2006: Chicago Blues Reunion (Music Avenue 250151) reissue of the Barry Goldberg and Friends material
- 2008: Harvey Mandel and the Snake Crew (self release), as part of the Snake Crew

== Sources ==
- Larkin, Colin. The Guinness Encyclopedia of Popular Music, Guinness Publishing, 1992.
- Muirhead, Bert. The Record Producers File. A Directory of Rock Album Producers 1962–1984, Blandford Press, 1985.
- Wright, H. Stephen; Limbacher, James L. Keeping Score. Film and Television Music, 1980–1988, Scarecrow Press, 1991.

=== Interviews ===
- 2008 Barry Goldberg @The Cabana Club in Hollywood, CA Rehearsals with Barry Goldberg- Jeanie Cunningham of The Composers Corner is the host of this six-part video series.
- "Barry Goldberg: Born and Raised to Play the Blues": Interview with Barry Goldberg (2012, Blues.gr)
