= Ambre McLean =

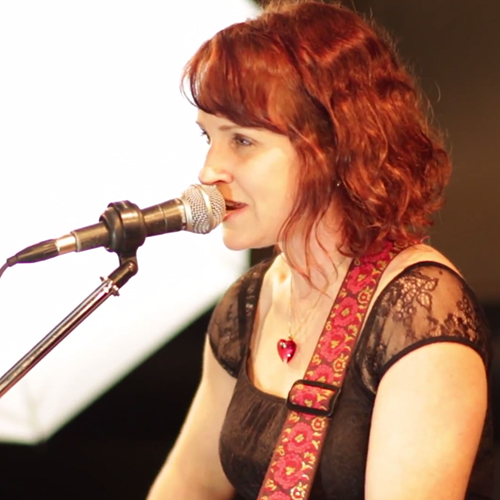
- Occupation: Singer-songwriter
- Years active: 2004–present

Ambre McLean is a Canadian-born singer-songwriter based in Smiths Falls, Ontario. McLean is known for her live performances, versatile and distinct singing voice, cross-genre songwriting style and use of live looping technology. McLean's debut album Just Passing Through was released independently in 2005. Since then she has released three additional albums, two on respected indie label Busted Flat Records and her latest album "Me" on Northwood Records.

Canadian radio personality Alan Cross said of McLean in 2013 "I find her voice fantastically expressive" She was in the final eight competitors in the CBC competition for "Canada's Best New Artist".

== Songs ==
- "Missing You" spent 5 weeks on the FMQB Top 200 AC charts, peaking at No. 38.
- "Me, My Heart and The Moon" was the winner of the 2010 Ontario Council of Folk Festival's "Songs from the Heart" Award
- "So Over" reached the Top 8 in CBC's 2013 "Searchlight: The Hunt for Canada's Best New Artist" competition
- "Summon Me" featured in the feature film Neverlost
- "I'll Be Home In Spring" featured on CBC's The Vinyl Cafe

== Discography ==
- 2005 – Just Passing Through
- 2006 – Live at the Brasserie
- 2007 – I Wonder If...
- 2010 – Murder at the Smokehouse
- 2014 – Me
- 2017 - My Heart
