= Staccato (music company) =

Musical instrument company

- Company type: Private
- Industry: Musical instrument manufacturing
- Founded: 1977; 49 years ago in Norwich, UK
- Founder: Pat Townshend
- Headquarters: Norwich, Norfolk, UK
- Products: Drums, guitars
- Website: staccatodrums.com

Staccato is a music company, specialising in guitars and drums.

== Staccato guitars ==
Pat Townshend designed the magnesium alloy guitar called, "The Staccato." The final guitar design featured a neck and bridge system that could be swapped out. The user could interchange a bass neck for a six string neck. Some models featured no volume or tone pots. The user could activate the volume controls on a touch sensitive LED pad.

Staccato guitars were conceived in 1978 the first was cast in aluminium, all guitars after 001 were cast in magnesium alloy. At the time both Travis Bean and Kramer guitars were also cast in aluminium, Staccato was the first and only production magnesium guitars made to this day. The first 21 guitars made by staccato were interchangeable neck models. The neck section could be replaced in a second with alternatives of 6 string, 12 string or bass guitar. again a unique concept, doing away with the need for a heavy cumbersome double neck guitar. The prototype was cast in Los Angeles and machined in John Carvthers guitar shop in Santa Monica. Pat did the final build, assembly and paint job at his home in Topanga Canyon, California.

The prototype bass was built in Norfolk, England in 1983 by Townshend who had a business partnership with Chris Jagger in the mid 1980s. There was a limited production run of Staccato guitars, produced at the old school house in Woodbastwick, Norfolk. The partners on equal shares were Pat Townshend, Bill Wyman, Chris and Mick Jagger.

This was something of a milestone in British music history for a musical instrument to be financially backed by members of the greatest rock 'n' roll band in the world the Rolling stones.

The M.G. model was launched in 1985, this was along more conventional lines with fixed neck (not interchangeable) but retaining the cast magnesium alloy though neck, precision right hand turning system and fibreglass body. Just over 200 of the M.G. models were built with the production ending in 1987 after Pat resigned from the company.

Gene Simmons can be seen playing a Staccato bass during Kiss' Crazy Nights World Tour.

== Staccato drums ==
Staccato drums designed by Pat Townshend first appeared in 1977. They were said to work on something called the “kadency” principle, in which “a volume of air projected through a controlled expanding space will have a great effect on tonal resonance, distribution and power.” In drummers’ terms, what they were truthfully saying was this gave clarity with loads and loads of volume.

To make this happen, Staccato's shells were quite thin, but were stronger than steel, being made from FRP (fibreglass reinforced polyester resin). But their real acoustic strength lay in the fact that the notched horns made them sound deep even though their heads were tight. The company claimed there was actually a difference of one octave between the head and the mouth of the drum, which was useful for recording because it offered many more miking options. The shape of this mouth was constant for all the drums, although its size was not.

The bass drum was even more distinctive, with two ray-shaped mouths known to Staccato as Siamese Twins, but to the rest of the world as “elephant’s trousers.” They were designed to work like those old public-address systems you once saw at sports grounds, with two trumpets for spread, sharing a single diaphragm.

They remain the most unusual and powerful in the world, possibly the most talked-about drum kit on the Internet. The stunning visual appearance and the thunderous sound of Staccato drums has drawn film, video and television producers. they have appeared in the fourth movie, Harry Potter and the Goblet of Fire, Robbie Williams Video, "let me entertain you" 1999, Robbie Coltrane – (The history of rock) channel 4 mid 1990s, Super Furry Animals – Top of the pops, August 2005. orange and black (vintage) Staccato kit, Glam metal detectives(BBC 2 series) mid 1990s. Single written by Jeff Beck, Top of the pops BBC1, Staccato Drums were also used in 2005 by the German Heavy metal band Rammstein- in the music Video "Amerika" the idea was implemented by one of the staccato drums promotional flyers where you can see the drummer as a NASA astronaut.

Bands and drummers that where involved in supporting Staccato drums: Mitch Mitchell – (ex Jimi Hendrix experience) Was the first drummer to ever play staccatos live (12", 10" and 8" toms) at the Golden Lion in Fulham, London 1977, Simon Phillips – World-renowned session drummer. bought the second bass drum made in 1977 and did a lot of studios work with his Staccato kit, Keith Moon – Used them on one (or possibly the last film of The Who playing together) Channel 4, late 1970s, John Bonham - played them at the Paul McCartney super sessions Abbey road studios late 1970s, Nicko McBrain Drummer from Iron Maiden - Wrote an article for Sounds music paper late 1970s on staccatos, played with French band trust on occasion live and did a great deal of testing in the recording studio.

Bands that recorded music in the 1970s and 1980s using staccato drums include: Uriah Heep, Gary Numan band's drummer Chris Slade, Bow Wow Wow, Yazz – "The only way is up" mid 1980s, Roxy music – "Angel eyes", The Guess Who – "American women" late 1980s, Eurythmics – "Sweet Dreams", Malcolm McLaren band, Spliff (Herwig Mitteregger as the "Spliff Radio Show "from 1980 used staccato drums ... you can also see on the cover - out tip:" Disco Caine "is the typical staccato sound).

Company founder Pat Townshend (November 4, 1945 – April 9, 2011) died in 2011. The five Townshend brothers Byron, Oliver, Jaime, Beau and Dean now run the Staccato company and continue to produce the Staccato Drums.
