= 10 Days Out: Blues from the Backroads =

Studio album by Kenny Wayne Shepherd
- Released: January 23, 2007
- Recorded: June 2004
- Genre: Blues rock
- Label: Reprise

Kenny Wayne Shepherd chronology
The Place You're In (2004)	10 Days Out: Blues from the Backroads (2007)	How I Go (2011)

10 Days Out: Blues from the Backroads is a CD/DVD and is the fifth release from American blues musician Kenny Wayne Shepherd. The documentary film was directed by Noble Jones and produced by Phillipa Davis. It was executive produced by Kelly Norris Sarno, Devin Sarno, Ken Shepherd, and Kristin Forbes. It was edited by Mark Morton. The CD was produced by Jerry Harrison. Tour still photography, CD, DVD, and LP photos by Amanda Gresham. 10 Days Out was nominated for two Grammys, Grammy Award for Best Long Form Music Video and Grammy Award For Best Traditional Blues Album at the 50th Grammy Awards and won the 2008 Blues Music Award for Best DVD and the 2008 Keeping the Blues Alive Award under the category of Film, Television or Video.

The documentary portion of the album featured a 10-day venture of Shepherd meeting blues pioneers with the intent of spotlighting veterans of the music genre. Artists include the Music Maker Relief Foundation's Etta Baker, Cootie Stark, and Neal Pattman, as well as B.B. King, Henry Townsend, Hubert Sumlin, Lazy Lester, Clarence "Gatemouth" Brown, David "Honeyboy" Edwards, Pinetop Perkins, and several others. It finished with a concert featuring the surviving members of both Muddy Waters’ and Howlin’ Wolf’s bands. Since completion of the film, at least eleven of the featured musicians have died, adding a cultural significance to the content.

== Track listing ==
No.	Title	Writer(s)	Length
1.	"Prison Blues"	Cootie Stark / Kenny Wayne Shepherd / Neal Pattman
2.	"Potato Patch"	Jerry "Boogie" McCain / Shepherd
3.	"Honky Tonk"	Buddy Flett / Shepherd
4.	"The Thrill Is Gone"	B.B. King / Shepherd
5.	"Tina Marie"	Bryan Lee / Shepherd
6.	"Born in Louisiana"	Clarence "Gatemouth" Brown / Shepherd
7.	"Chapel Hill Boogie"	John Dee Holeman / Shepherd
8.	"Tears Came Rollin' Down"	Henry Townsend / Shepherd
9.	"Knoxville Rag"	Etta Baker / Shepherd
10.	"Big Daddy Boogie"	Neal Pattman / Shepherd
11.	"U-Haul"	Cootie Stark / Shepherd
12.	"Red Rooster"	Henry Gray / Willie Dixon / Shepherd
13.	"Sittin' on Top of the World"	Howlin' Wolf Band / Hubert Sumlin / Shepherd
14.	"Spoonful"	George "Wild Child" Butler / Willie Dixon/ Shepherd
15.	"Grindin' Man"	Muddy Waters Band / Pinetop Perkins / Shepherd
