= Trouble Is... =

Trouble Is ...

Studio album by Kenny Wayne Shepherd Band
- Released: October 7, 1997
- Studios: Dogma Studio, New York City
- Genre: Blues rock
- Length: 56:28
- Label: Revolution
- Producer: Jerry Harrison

Kenny Wayne Shepherd Band chronology
Ledbetter Heights (1995)	Trouble Is ... (1997)	Live On (1999)

Singles from Trouble Is...
- 1. "Slow Ride" Released: October 1997; 2. "Somehow, Somewhere, Someway" Released: January 1998; 3. "Blue on Black" Released: April 7, 1998; 4. "Everything Is Broken" Released: December 1998

Professional ratings
Review scores
Source	Rating
AllMusic	3/5 stars
The Penguin Guide to Blues Recordings	2/4 stars

Trouble Is ... is the second album by American blues solo artist Kenny Wayne Shepherd and the first to be released under the Kenny Wayne Shepherd Band moniker. It is the first of several albums to feature Noah Hunt on vocals.

It features the no. 1 Mainstream Rock hit "Blue on Black", which also reached no. 78 on the Billboard Hot 100. The album also spawned three further rock hits, including "Slow Ride", "Somehow, Somewhere, Someway", and "Everything Is Broken", a Bob Dylan cover. It also features a cover of "I Don't Live Today" by Jimi Hendrix. Trouble Is ... was certified Gold by the RIAA in 1998 and certified Platinum in 1999. The track "Trouble Is..." appeared in the EA Sports video game NASCAR 2001.

== Track listing ==
No.	Title	Writer(s)	Length
1.	"Slow Ride"	Kenny Wayne Shepherd, Danny Tate, Mark Selby	3:49
2.	"True Lies"	Shepherd, Tate	5:48
3.	"Blue on Black"	Shepherd, Tate, Tia Sillers	5:30
4.	"Everything Is Broken" (Bob Dylan cover)	Dylan	3:48
5.	"I Don't Live Today" (Jimi Hendrix cover)	Hendrix	4:34
6.	"(Long) Gone"	Shepherd, Tate, Selby	5:24
7.	"Somehow, Somewhere, Someway"	Shepherd, Tate	5:34
8.	"I Found Love (When I Found You)"	Shepherd, Tate	4:01
9.	"King's Highway"	Shepherd, Selby, Sillers	4:17
10.	"Nothing to Do with Love" (Bonnie Tyler cover)	Jerry Lynn Williams, Frankie Miller	4:49
11.	"Chase the Rainbow"	Shepherd, Steven M. Krikorian	4:57
12.	"Trouble Is..."	Shepherd, Chris Layton, Tommy Shannon, Reese Wynans	3:57

Japanese version bonus track
No.	Title	Writer(s)	Length
13.	"Voodoo Child" (Jimi Hendrix cover)	Hendrix	9:32

== Personnel ==
Kenny Wayne Shepherd Band

- Kenny Wayne Shepherd – lead guitar, vocals
- Noah Hunt – vocals
- Joe Nadeau – rhythm guitar
- Jimmy Wallace – keyboards
- Robby Emerson – bass
- Sam Bryant – drums

Guest musicians

- James Cotton – harmonica
- Chris Layton – drums
- Tommy Shannon – bass
- Reese Wynans – keyboards
- Stephanie Spruill – backing vocals
- Patricia Hodges – backing vocals

Production

- Jerry Harrison – producer, arranger
- Bob Ludwig – mastering
- Tom Lord-Alge – mixing
- Joe Chiccarelli – mixing
- Larry Brewer – engineer
- Chris Collins – engineer

== Charts ==
Chart performance for Trouble Is...
Chart (1997–1998)	Peak position
Australian Albums (ARIA)	57
New Zealand Albums (RMNZ)	36
US Billboard 200	74
US Blues Albums (Billboard)	1
