= Carla Olson =

American singer (born 1952)

- Born: July 3, 1952 (age 73); Austin, Texas, U.S.
- Genres: Rock
- Occupations: Singer-songwriter; guitarist
- Instrument: Guitar
- Years active: 1978–present
- Labels: A&M Records; Virgin Records Sweden; IRS Records; Enigma Records; Fuel2000 Records; Sunset Blvd Music; Demon Records; BFD Records
- Website: carlaolson.com

Carla Olson (born July 3, 1952) is an American, Los Angeles-based songwriter, performer and record producer.

== Biography ==
Born and raised in Austin, Texas, Olson moved to Los Angeles, California, in 1978 where she formed the Textones, whose debut album Midnight Mission entered the Billboard 200. Carla is multilingual. She served as a French translator for Malian legend Ali Farka Toure. She also speaks Italian, Japanese and Swedish.

An early version of the Textones, consisting of Olson, Kathy Valentine, Markus Cuff, and David Provost, played the late 1970s punk/new wave scene in Los Angeles and toured the US and Europe. They also released an EP in the UK and a single in the US. Their debut album for A&M Records, Midnight Mission, consisted of Olson along with George Callins, Joe Read, Tom Jr Morgan, and Phil Seymour. They also toured the US and Europe. The record charted at 76 on the Billboard 200, and both singles, "Standing in the Line" and "Midnight Mission", were featured videos on MTV, and received radio airplay as well. The second Textones album, Cedar Creek, was released in 1987 by Enigma Records.

Olson has received critical acclaim for her work as a solo performer, band leader, and producer. In varying capacities, she has worked with former Rolling Stones' guitarist Mick Taylor, Percy Sledge (Sledge has recorded five songs that Olson has written or co-written), Ry Cooder, Gene Clark, Don Henley, Bob Dylan, Eric Clapton, John Fogerty, Mikael Rickfors, and many others. Her musical partnerships in the 1980s included former Byrd member Gene Clark (which resulted in a duet album, So Rebellious a Lover) and Mick Taylor. The Carla Olson and Mick Taylor band included George Callins on guitar, Jesse Sublett on bass (Sublett had previously played with Olson and Valentine in Austin in a band called the Violators), Tom Jr Morgan on saxophone, and Rick Hemmert on drums. Their live album Too Hot For Snakes added Ian McLagan (Small Faces, Faces) and Barry Goldberg (the Electric Flag, the Rides) on keyboards. Varying combinations of these musicians also appear on the subsequent Olson studio albums Within An Ace, Reap The Whirlwind, and The Ring Of Truth.

Olson also appeared in Bob Dylan's first video (for the song "Sweetheart Like You"). To return the favor, Dylan gave Olson his previously unreleased song "Clean Cut Kid" which she recorded on Midnight Mission. Ry Cooder played slide guitar on the track.

Since 2001 Olson has concentrated most of her energies on music production, but has continued her songwriting and co-writing activities. She has written music for lyrics (or poems) by Sterling A. Brown, George Callins, Cream lyricist Pete Brown, Allan Clarke, George Green, Rick Hemmert, Brian Jones and Jim Morrison. (The latter collaboration was released in December 2019 on the expanded release of True Voices i.e. Ode To L.A. While Thinking Of Brian Jones, Deceased as performed by Johnny Indovina of Human Drama.) She has also written with Barry Goldberg, Kathy Valentine, Mikael Rickfors, Danny Tate, Danny Wilde and Pete Brown.

In 2013, after not releasing an album of her own since The Ring of Truth in 2001, Olson recorded Have Harmony, Will Travel, which is an album of cover songs with guest vocalists on each track including Rob Waller, John York, Richie Furay, Juice Newton, James Inveldt, Scott Kempner, Peter Case and Gary Myrick.

May 26, 2015, saw the re-release of the Textones albums Midnight Mission and Cedar Creek by Omnivore Recordings. Both albums were expanded editions with additional studio tracks, live recordings, photos and newly written essays.

In January 2017, Olsons's debut solo album, recorded in Malmo, Sweden, in 1988, was released in the U.S. by Sunset Blvd Records. This U.S. edition is titled Rubies & Diamonds after one of the album's tracks. It featured Olson and George Callins of the Textones, plus Gene Clark on vocals, plus most of the members of the Swedish rock band Wilmer X: Thomas Holst (lead guitar), Stefan Bjork (bass guitar), Sticky Bomb (drums) and Jalle Lorensson (harmonica). The album was produced by Tomas Gabrielsson along with Olson and Callins.

In February 2020, Olson released Have Harmony, Will Travel 2 – the sequel to volume 1. The new album included new duets with Stephen McCarthy (of The Long Ryders), Timothy B. Schmit, Peter Noone, Terry Reid, Jim Muske, Ana Gazzola as well asfour4 archive recordings featuring Percy Sledge, Gene Clark, and I See Hawks In L.A.

In late 2021, BMG Records / Renew released a vinyl album Americana Railroad. It was released on CD in 2022. The album featured nine tracks produced by Olson: "Here Comes That Train Again" and "I Remember The Railroad" by Stephen McCarthy and Carla Olson, "The Conductor Wore Black" and "Midnight Rail" by Robert Rex Waller Jr, "Mystery Train" by Rocky Burnette, "Train Kept A-Rollin'" by Gary Myrick, "Runaway Train" by John York, also "Mystery Train" by James Intveld and "Southwest Chief" by Dave Alvin. Olson also appeared with Brian Ray performing "Whiskey Train" and she mixed John Fogerty's contribution, "City of New Orleans".
