= Live On (Kenny Wayne Shepherd album) =

1999 studio album by Kenny Wayne Shepherd

Studio album by Kenny Wayne Shepherd Band
- Released: October 12, 1999
- Studios: Arlyn Studios, The Record Plant, House of Blues
- Genres: Blues rock, electric blues
- Length: 54:59
- Label: Giant
- Producer: Jerry Harrison

Kenny Wayne Shepherd Band chronology
Trouble Is... (1997)	Live On (1999)	The Place You're In (2004)

Professional ratings
Review scores
Source	Rating
Allmusic	4/5 stars
Rolling Stone	2.5/5 stars
The Penguin Guide to Blues Recordings	2/4 stars

Live On is the third studio album by American blues solo artist Kenny Wayne Shepherd, released in 1999. It was certified Gold by the RIAA in 2000. Live On marks the second album (the first being Trouble Is...) to feature vocals from Noah Hunt.

== Track listing ==
1. "In 2 Deep" (Shepherd, Mark Selby, Danny Tate) – 3:15
2. "Was" (Shepherd, Selby, Tia Sillers) – 4:00
3. "Them Changes" (Buddy Miles) – 3:19
4. "Last Goodbye" (Shepherd, Selby, Sillers) – 4:33
5. "Shotgun Blues" (Shepherd, Noah Hunt) – 4:49
6. "Never Mind" (Shepherd, Selby, Sillers) – 3:58
7. "You Should Know Better" (Shepherd, Tate) – 4:12
8. "Every Time It Rains" (Shepherd, Selby, Sillers) – 3:46
9. "Oh Well" (Peter Green) – 3:37
10. "Wild Love" (Shepherd, Tate) – 3:42
11. "Losing Kind" (Shepherd, Selby, Sillers) – 4:31
12. "Live On" (Shepherd, Selby, Sillers) – 4:35
13. "Where Was I?" (Shepherd, Selby, Hunt) – 3:30
14. "Electric Lullaby" (Shepherd) – 3:12

== Personnel ==
=== Kenny Wayne Shepherd Band ===
- Kenny Wayne Shepherd: Vocals, rhythm and lead guitar
- Keith Christopher: Bass
- Sam Bryant: Drums, percussion
- Noah Hunt: Lead Vocals

=== Additional Personnel ===
- Pat Hodges, Stephanie Spruill: Vocals
- Warren Haynes: Vocals, slide guitar
- Bryan Lee: Rhythm and lead guitar
- Reese Wynans: Keyboards
- Mickey Raphael, James Cotton: Harmonica
- Arion Salazar, Les Claypool, Tommy Shannon: Bass
- Chris Layton: Drums, percussion
  - Note that keyboardist Wynans, bassist Shannon and drummer Layton had all served as the backing band for blues/rock guitarist Stevie Ray Vaughan, called Double Trouble.

== Charts ==
Album - Billboard (United States)

Year	Chart	Position
1999	Billboard 200	52

Singles - Billboard (United States)

Year	Single	Chart	Position
1999	"In 2 Deep"	Mainstream Rock Tracks	5
2000	"Was"	Mainstream Rock Tracks	9
2000	"Last Goodbye"	Mainstream Rock Tracks	14
