= Kenny Wayne Shepherd =

American guitarist (born 1977)

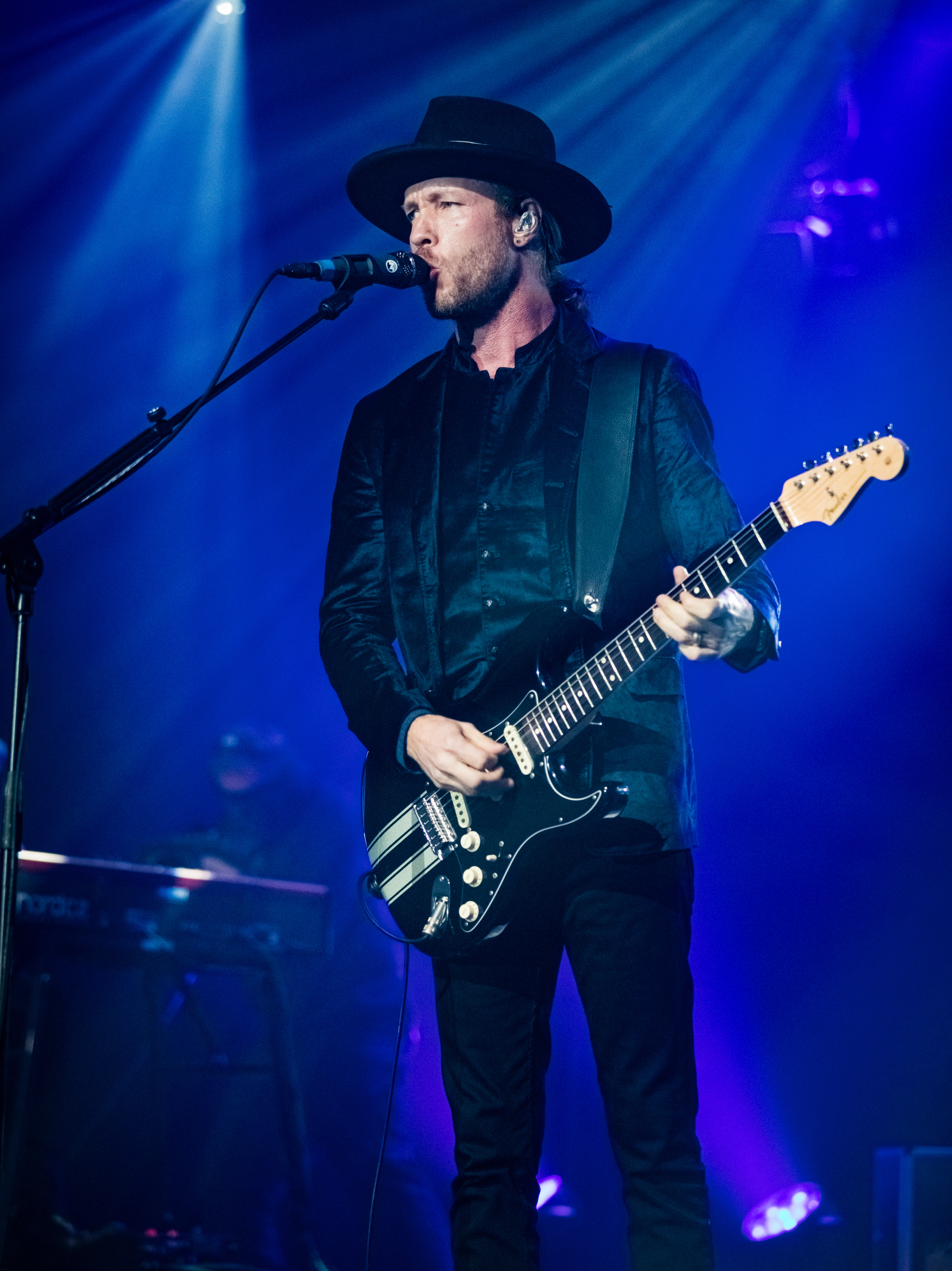
- Shepherd performing at the Leverkusener Jazztage in 2019

Background information
- Born: Kenny Wayne Brobst; June 12, 1977 (age 49); Shreveport, Louisiana, U.S.
- Genres: Blues rock; blues; rock; roots rock; hard rock
- Occupations: Musician; songwriter
- Instrument: Guitar
- Years active: 1990–present
- Labels: Concord; Roadrunner; Mascot
- Member of: Kenny Wayne Shepherd Band; The Rides
- Formerly of: G3
- Website: kennywayneshepherd.net

Kenny Wayne Shepherd (born Kenneth Wayne Brobst; June 12, 1977) is an American guitarist. He has released several studio albums and experienced significant commercial success as a blues rock artist.

== Early life ==
Shepherd was born in Shreveport, Louisiana. He graduated from Caddo Magnet High School in Shreveport. He is "completely self-taught", and does not read music. Growing up, Shepherd's father (Ken Shepherd) was a local radio personality and part-time concert promoter, and had a vast collection of music. Kenny received his first "guitar" at the age of three or four, when his grandmother purchased a series of several plastic guitars for him with S&H Green Stamps, which he has said he would "go through like candy".

Shepherd stated in a 2011 interview that he began playing guitar in earnest at age seven, about six months after meeting and being "pretty mesmerized" by Stevie Ray Vaughan, Labor Day weekend in 1984, at one of his father's promoted concerts. His self-taught method employed a process of learning one note at a time, playing and rewinding cassette tapes, using "a cheap Yamaha wanna-be Stratocaster ... made out of plywood, basically", and learning to play by following along with material from his father's record collection.

== Career ==
Blues musician Bryan Lee invited the then-13-year-old Shepherd to play guitar onstage. He subsequently made demo tapes, and a video was shot at Shepherd's first performance at the Red River Revel Arts Festival in Shreveport. It was this video performance that impressed Giant Records chief Irving Azoff enough to sign Shepherd to a multiple album record deal.

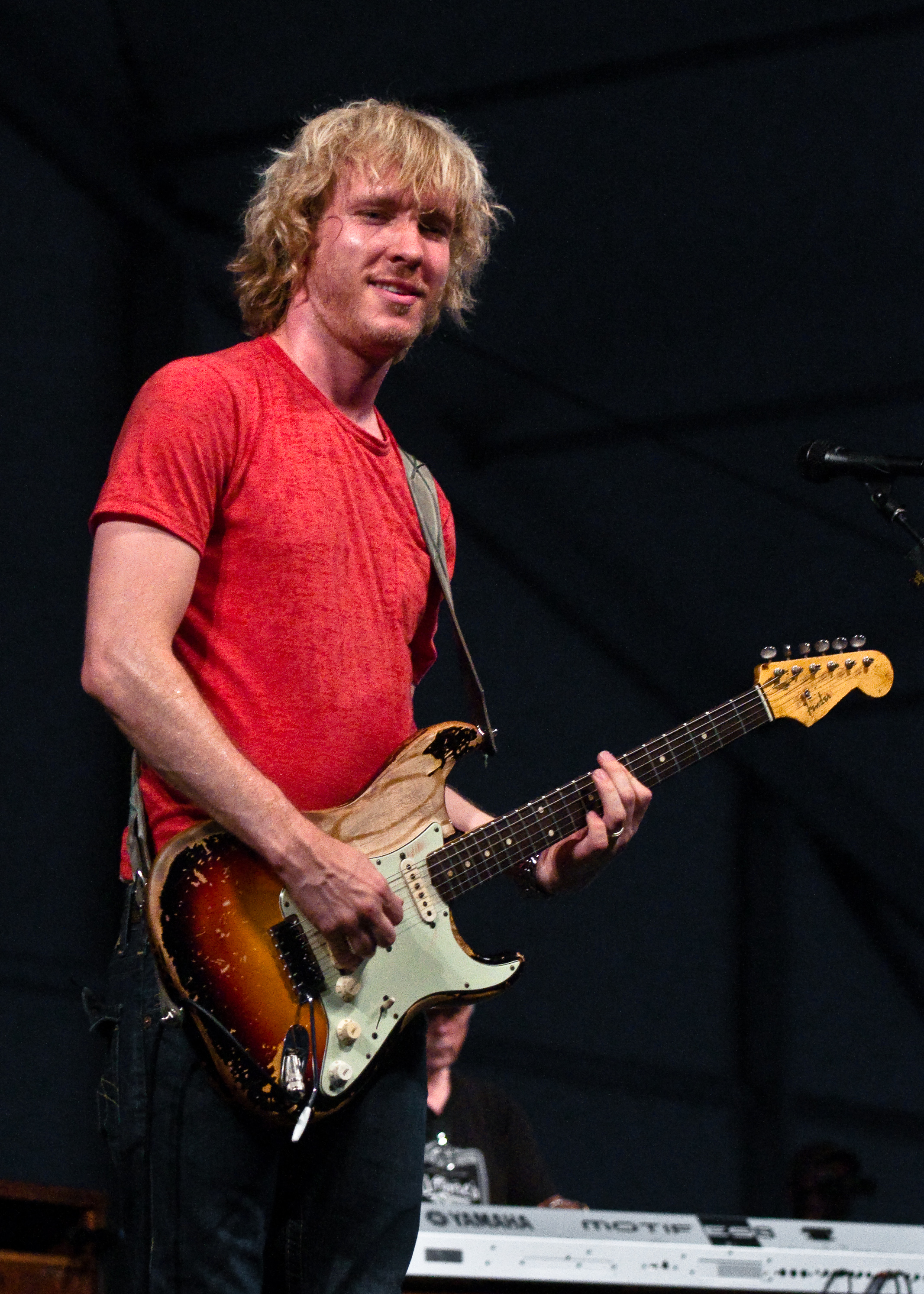
Shepherd during the New Orleans Jazz & Heritage Festival in 2010

Beginning in 1995, Shepherd took seven singles into the Top 10, and holds the record for the longest-running album on the Billboard Blues Charts with Trouble Is.... In 1996, Shepherd began a longtime collaboration with vocalist Noah Hunt, who provided the vocals for Shepherd's signature song, "Blue on Black". Shepherd has been nominated for five Grammy Awards, and has received two Billboard Music Awards, two Blues Music Awards, and two Orville H. Gibson Awards.

In 2000, Shepherd played guitar on the end title theme for the animated feature Batman Beyond: Return of the Joker.

In 2007, he released a critically acclaimed and two-time Grammy nominated DVD–CD project, 10 Days Out: Blues from the Backroads. This documents Shepherd as he travels the country to jam with and interview the last of the authentic blues musicians. As they tour the back-roads, Shepherd, with members of the Double Trouble Band, play with a host of blues greats including Clarence "Gatemouth" Brown and Bryan Lee, Buddy Flett (with whom he jams at Lead Belly's grave), B. B. King, blues harp master Jerry "Boogie" McCain, Cootie Stark, Neal Pattman, John Dee Holeman, Etta Baker, Henry Townsend with David "Honeyboy" Edwards, and a concert session with the surviving members of Muddy Waters' and Howlin' Wolf's bands, including Hubert Sumlin, Willie "Big Eyes" Smith and Pinetop Perkins.

In September 2008, Fender Musical Instruments Corp. released the Kenny Wayne Shepherd Signature Series Stratocaster, designed exclusively by Shepherd. In 2010, Shepherd was nominated for a Grammy for Live in Chicago, which featured performances with Hubert Sumlin, Willie "Big Eyes" Smith, Buddy Flett, and Bryan Lee. In 2011, Shepherd released his seventh CD, titled How I Go, on Roadrunner Records.

In 2014, he released "Goin Home" on Mascot Label Group in Europe, and on Concord Records in the US and the rest of the world. In 2015, Shepherd released "Something from the Road Vol. 1", a live special release for Record Store Day in the U.S.

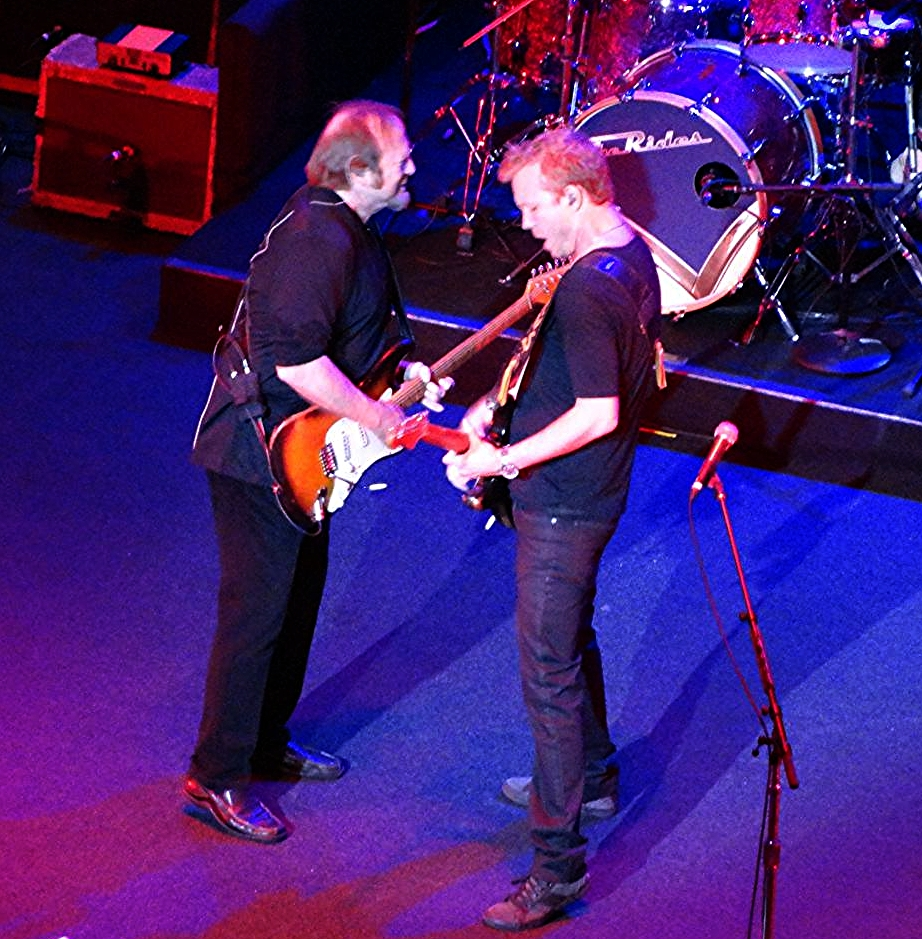
Shepherd (right) and Stephen Stills perform as The Rides in Boston, 2013

In January 2017, the Kenny Wayne Shepherd Band went into the studio with producer Marshall Altman to record a new album of all newly written songs, titled Lay It On Down, and released the album on August 4 (July 21 in Europe via Mascot Label Group). Lay It On Down is the eighth record by the Kenny Wayne Shepherd Band to debut at No. 1 on the Billboard Blues Chart.

Shepherd made his Edinburgh Jazz & Blues Festival debut on July 16, 2019. On May 31, 2019, Shepherd released The Traveler on Concord Records and Mascot Label Group in Europe. The album, like the previous release Lay It On Down, was co-produced by Marshall Altman. The Traveler was chosen as a Favorite Blues Album by AllMusic. Shepherd headlined the 2020 Mahindra Blues Festival, along with Buddy Guy, Larkin Poe and Keb Mo.

In March 2021, the Blues Foundation revoked Kenny Wayne Shepherd's 2021 Blues Music Awards nomination for Best Blues/Rock Artist. According to a statement from the organization, the decision was "based upon continuing revelations of representations of the Confederate flag on Shepherd's 'General Lee' car, guitars and elsewhere." After Shepherd procured the car and a custom guitar with the flag emblazoned on it in 2015, he explained "The confederate flag can be controversial, but not in this case." Following the rebuke from the Blues Foundation, Shepherd acknowledged the offensiveness of the flag, saying, "Years ago I put that car in permanent storage and some time ago, I made the decision to permanently cover the flag on my car because it was completely against my values and offensive to the African American community which created the music I love so much and I apologize to anyone that I have unintentionally hurt because of it." The organization also asked Shepherd's father, Ken Shepherd, to step down as a member of its board of directors. Ken Shepherd declined to comment on being asked to step down.

On December 2, 2022, Shepherd released Trouble Is... 25, a complete re-recording of his second album for its 25th anniversary. The album includes a never-before-heard cover of Bob Dylan's "Ballad of a Thin Man."

November of 2023 saw the release of Dirt on My Diamonds Vol. 1 which was produced by Shepherd and Marshall Altman. The album debuted at #1 on the Blues charts. It was followed up in September of 2024 with Dirt on My Diamonds Vol. 2, which also debuted at # 1 on the Blues Charts.

=== The Rides ===
In 2013, Shepherd, along with Stephen Stills (Crosby, Stills & Nash) and Barry Goldberg (The Electric Flag), formed The Rides. They released their debut album Can't Get Enough on August 27, 2013. Stills refers to the band as "the blues band of my dreams." The band toured the US in 2013, supporting their debut record, culminating with an appearance on The Tonight Show with Jay Leno. The three reunited in 2015 for a follow-up album, Pierced Arrow (2016), released on 429 Records and Mascot Label Group in Europe.

== Personal life ==
Shepherd married Hannah Gibson, the eldest daughter of actor Mel Gibson, on September 16, 2006.

== Live performances ==
- 2019 touring with Buddy Guy
- Shepherd and his band teamed up with vocalist Beth Hart and her band in a double-headliner tour along the US east coast in Summer 2018.
- Shepherd was the opening act for Van Halen on their 1998 tour and again on their Van Halen 2015 North American Tour.
- Shepherd undertook a double-headliner tour in Summer 2015 with Jonny Lang.
- Shepherd made a trip of ten days in the US to meet and play with his idols: B.B. King, Clarence "Gatemouth" Brown, Hubert Sumlin, Pinetop Perkins, Henry Townsend, Honeyboy Edwards, Cootie Stark, Neal Pattman, Etta Baker, Jerry "Boogie" McCain, Buddy Flett, Bryan Lee, John Dee Holeman, and the Howlin' Wolf and Muddy Waters Bands. This effort would later become his fifth album, 10 Days Out: Blues from the Backroads.
- Shepherd and Bryan Lee appeared as the musical guest on The Tonight Show with Jay Leno on February 14, 2007.
- On July 24, 2007, he opened for Lynyrd Skynyrd at the Orange County Fair.
- He was the opening act for The Rolling Stones during a stint of their 1999 No Security Tour.
- Shepherd performed some of his songs including a cover of Jimi Hendrix's "Voodoo Child" at the Dutch Mason Blues Festival in 2007 and 2009.
- He has also opened for Aerosmith, Bob Dylan, the Eagles (originally on the Hell Freezes Over Tour), and Van Halen.
- Late Night with Jimmy Fallon performance, Nov 2010 – Shepherd sat in with house band, playing the actual white Stratocaster Jimi Hendrix used during his historic performance at Woodstock.
- On January 15, 2011, Shepherd performed a live set for "Guitar Center Sessions" on DirecTV. The episode included an interview with Shepherd by program host, Nic Harcourt.
- Shepherd appeared at the Experience Hendrix tribute concert in Mesa Arizona on May 23, 2011.
- Shepherd opened for BB King in Atlanta's Chastain Park Amphitheater on July 4, 1999.
- Trouble Is... 25th Anniversary Concert at the Strand Theatre, Shreveport, LA February 12, 2022

== Band members ==
- Kenny Wayne Shepherd – lead guitar, vocals (1990–present)
- Noah Hunt – lead vocals, rhythm guitar, percussion (1997–present)
- Chris Layton – drums (2006–present)
- Kevin McCormick – bass (2017–present)
- Joe Krown – keyboards (2017–present)
- Doug Woolverton – trumpet (2024–present)
- Charlie DiPuma - saxophone (2024-present)
- Corey Sterling – lead vocals (1994–1996)

== Discography ==
=== Studio albums ===
Title	Album details	Peak chart positions							Certifications
Title	Album details	US	US Blues	AUS	NZ	SWE	SWI	UK	Certifications
Ledbetter Heights	Released: September 19, 1995; Label: Giant; Formats: CD, CS	108	1	—	25	—	—	—	RIAA: Platinum
Trouble Is...	Released: October 7, 1997; Label: Revolution/Giant; Formats: CD, CS	74	1	57	36	—	—	—	RIAA: Platinum
Live On	Released: October 12, 1999; Label: Giant; Formats: CD, CS	52	1	—	—	—	—	—	RIAA: Gold
The Place You're In	Released: October 5, 2004; Label: Reprise; Formats: CD, digital download	101	—	—	—	—	—	—	
10 Days Out: Blues from the Backroads	Released: January 23, 2007; Label: Reprise; Formats: CD, LP, DI	164	1	—	—	52	—	—	RIAA: Platinum
How I Go	Released: August 2, 2011; Label: Roadrunner; Formats: CD, LP, DI	52	1	—	—	—	86	92	
Goin' Home	Released: May 19, 2014; Labels: Concord and Provogue/Mascot Label Group; Formats: CD, LP, DI	25	1	—	—	—	77	82	
Lay It On Down	Released: August 4, 2017; Labels: Concord and Provogue/Mascot Label Group; Formats: CD, LP, digital download, streaming	34	1	—	—	—	27	100	
The Traveler	Released: May 31, 2019; Labels: Concord and Provogue/Mascot Label Group; Formats: CD, LP, digital download, streaming	103	1	—	—	—	12	94	
Trouble Is... 25	Released: December 2, 2022; Label: Provogue/Mascot Label Group; Format: CD, LP, digital download, streaming	—	—	—	—	—	—	—	
Dirt on My Diamonds Vol. 1	Scheduled: November 17, 2023; Label: Provogue/Mascot Label Group; Format: CD, LP, digital download, streaming	—	—	—	—	—	44	—	
Dirt on My Diamonds Vol. 2	Scheduled: September 20, 2024; Label: Provogue/Mascot Label Group; Format: CD, LP, digital download, streaming	—	—	—	—	—	—	—	
"—" denotes a release that did not chart.

=== Live albums ===
Title	Album details	Peak chart positions		
Title	Album details	US	US Blues	US Rock
Live! in Chicago	Released: September 27, 2010; Label: Roadrunner; Formats: CD	114	1	42
Straight to You: Live	Released: November 27, 2020; Label: Provogue; Formats: CD+DVD	—	—	—
"—" denotes a release that did not chart.

=== EPs ===
Title	EP details
King's Highway EP	Released: October 7, 1997; Label: Reprise; Formats: CD, CS, DI

=== Singles ===
Year	Song	Peak chart positions		Certifications	Album
Year	Song	US	US Main. Rock	Certifications	Album
1995	"Déjà Voodoo"	—	9		Ledbetter Heights
1996	"Born with a Broken Heart"	—	15		Ledbetter Heights
1996	"Aberdeen"	—	23		Ledbetter Heights
1997	"Slow Ride"	—	3		Trouble Is...
1998	"Somehow, Somewhere, Someway"	—	3		Trouble Is...
1998	"Blue on Black"	78	1	RIAA: Platinum	Trouble Is...
1998	"Everything Is Broken"	—	10		Trouble Is...
1999	"In 2 Deep"	—	5		Live On
2000	"Was"	—	9		Live On
2000	"Last Goodbye"	—	14		Live On
2004	"Alive"	—	13		The Place You're In
2005	"The Place You're In"	—	30		The Place You're In
2011	"Never Lookin' Back"	—	36		How I Go
2011	"Come on Over"	—	—		How I Go
2014	"You Can't Judge a Book By the Cover"	—	—		Goin' Home
2020	"Christmas Must Be Tonight"	—	—		Non-album singles
2020	"Cool Yule"	—	—		Non-album singles
2020	"Zat You Santa Claus"	—	—		Non-album singles
2021	"Hit 'Em Back" (with Shemekia Copeland featuring Robert Randolph and Tony Coleman)	—	—		Non-album singles
2022	"True Lies"	—	—		Trouble Is... 25
2022	"Ballad of a Thin Man"	—	—		Trouble Is... 25
"—" denotes a release that did not chart.
