= Ledbetter Heights =

Studio album by Kenny Wayne Shepherd
- Released: September 19, 1995
- Recorded: 1994–1995
- Studio: House of Blues (Memphis); Funkytown (Hollywood); Ocean Way (Hollywood)
- Genre: Blues, blues rock
- Length: 60:55
- Label: Giant Records
- Producer: Kenny Wayne Shepherd, David Z

Kenny Wayne Shepherd chronology
Ledbetter Heights (1995)	Trouble Is... (1997)

Ledbetter Heights is the debut album by American blues solo artist Kenny Wayne Shepherd, released on September 19, 1995, when Shepherd was 18 years old. The album's name refers to a neighborhood in Shepherd's hometown of Shreveport, Louisiana. It also featured lead singer Corey Sterling on vocals.

Ledbetter Heights was an immediate hit, selling over 500,000 copies by early 1996. It was certified Gold by the RIAA in 1996 and certified Platinum by 2004, and achieved an unusual level of commercial success for a blues album, especially considering Shepherd's young age at release. Ledbetter Heights also spent 20 weeks topping Billboard's blues chart. In their list of blues artists, Guitar World voted Shepherd number 3 after B. B. King and Eric Clapton.

== Album title ==
The Ledbetter Heights neighborhood, formerly known as "St. Paul's Bottoms" and traditionally referred to as "The Bottoms", is one of the earliest parts of Shreveport to be settled outside the original downtown district, dating back to the 19th century. For almost all of its history, it has been predominantly African-American. In the early 20th century, there was a red-light district with legal prostitution within this neighborhood, and musician Huddie "Lead Belly" Ledbetter, after whom the neighborhood is now named, lived and performed there. The renaming of the neighborhood to Ledbetter Heights in the 1990s was part of an effort to rehabilitate the area's image, as it had become known as an economically depressed and crime-ridden area.

Shepherd named his debut album after this neighborhood as an homage to the blues tradition of his hometown.

== Writing credit ==
Kenny Wayne Shepherd wrote/co-wrote all but four songs found on the album.

The album track "I'm Leaving You (Commit a Crime)" is incorrectly credited on the album to Howlin' Wolf. Although Howlin' Wolf was the first to record the song on his album The London Howlin' Wolf Sessions, it was written by James Oden, although writer Bill Janovitz says otherwise on AllMusic. The title is also incorrect, because "I'm Leaving You" is a completely different song by Howlin' Wolf. This song was originally titled "What a Woman!", but was released after Wolf's death as "Commit a Crime" on his 1984 album All Night Boogie. Five years later, in 1986, musician Stevie Ray Vaughan included a version of the song on his own album, Live Alive. It is likely the title used was an honest mistake, since the song begins with the lyrics, "I'm leaving you, woman, before I commit a crime". When Shepherd recorded the song for his own 1995 album Ledbetter Heights, he carried on the mistake and used Stevie Ray Vaughan's title for the song, also incorrectly crediting Wolf as the writer.

== Critical reception ==
Professional ratings
Review scores
Source	Rating
AllMusic	4/5 stars
Christgau's Consumer Guide	(1-star Honorable Mention)
The Penguin Guide to Blues Recordings	3/4 stars

In Christgau's Consumer Guide, Robert Christgau relegated the album to his list of "honorable mentions". While highlighting "Born with a Broken Heart" and "I'm Leaving You (Commit a Crime)", he wrote in summary that Shepherd "plays better blues readymades than he writes [and] writes better blues readymades than his front man sings". AllMusic's Thom Owens later said that "Shepherd burns through a set of rather generic blues-rock ravers that are made special by his exceptional technique. It may still be a while before he says something original, but he plays with style, energy, and dedication, which is more than enough for a debut album."

== Track listing ==
No.	Title	Writer(s)	Length
1.	"Born with a Broken Heart"	Kenny Wayne Shepherd, Danny Tate	5:56
2.	"Déjà Voodoo"	Mark Selby, Shepherd, Tia Sillers	6:09
3.	"Aberdeen"	Bukka White	4:15
4.	"Shame, Shame, Shame"	Joe Nadeau, Shepherd	6:05
5.	"One Foot on the Path"	Selby, Shepherd	3:49
6.	"Everybody Gets the Blues"	Angel Michael	5:58
7.	"While We Cry (live)"	Shepherd	6:17
8.	"I'm Leaving You (Commit a Crime)"	Howlin' Wolf	4:16
9.	"(Let Me Up) I've Had Enough"	Nadeau, Selby, Shepherd	2:43
10.	"Riverside"	Kevin Bowe	3:46
11.	"What's Goin' Down"	Nadeau, Shepherd	5:30
12.	"Ledbetter Heights"	Shepherd	6:11
Total length:			60:55

== Charts ==
Album – Billboard (United States)

Year	Chart	Position
1995	Heatseekers	1
1995	Top Blues Albums	2
1996	The Billboard 200	108

Singles – Billboard (United States)

Year	Single	Chart	Position
1995	"Déjà Voodoo"	Mainstream Rock Tracks	9
1996	"Aberdeen"	Mainstream Rock Tracks	23
1996	"Born with a Broken Heart"	Mainstream Rock Tracks	15
