= Cootie Stark =

American singer

Background information
- Also known as: Blind Johnny Miller
- Born: Johnny Miller; December 27, 1927; Abbeville, South Carolina, U.S.
- Died: April 14, 2005 (aged 77) Greenville, South Carolina, U.S.
- Genres: Piedmont blues
- Occupations: Musician; songwriter
- Instruments: Guitar; vocals
- Years active: Late 1930s–2005
- Label: Music Maker

Johnny Miller (December 27, 1927 – April 14, 2005), known as Cootie Stark, was an American Piedmont blues guitarist, singer, and songwriter. His best remembered recordings were "Metal Bottoms" and "Sandyland." Stark was known as the "King of the Piedmont Blues."

== Biography ==
Stark was born Johnny Miller in Abbeville, South Carolina, the son of sharecroppers, and grew up in Anderson County. Stark was given his first guitar by his father at the age of 14, having then relocated to Greenville, South Carolina. His poor eyesight meant that he was unable to find regular employment. He began busking on street corners, and learned his art from fellow street performers such as Peg Leg Sam, Pink Anderson and Josh White plus, particularly in his earliest days, from Baby Tate. He acquired the nickname, Sugar Man, and continued to work his trade as a songster in the area. His performing name of Cootie Stark was an amalgam of a childhood nickname and his grandfather's surname.

His eyesight deteriorated until he was legally registered as blind, but Stark continued to perform across the State and beyond, often using the name Blind Johnny Miller. However, by the 1980s, with playing prospects diminishing, Stark settled in Greenville. "By then, the real Piedmont blues was pretty much gone," he stated. "All them guys were dead and gone and I wasn't making no headway." In 1997, when Stark was over 70 years old, he was heard playing Fats Domino songs by Tim Duffy, the founder of the Music Maker Relief Foundation. Their record label released Stark's debut album, Sugar Man, in 1999. In 2003, Stark released his second and final album, Raw Sugar, when he was again accompanied on record by Taj Mahal. He received the South Carolina Folk Heritage Award in 2005.

Stark died at the age of 77, in Greenville, in April 2005.

== Discography ==
=== Solo albums ===
Year	Title	Record label
1999	Sugar Man	Music Maker
2003	Raw Sugar	Music Maker

=== Guest appearances ===
Year	Album	Artist	Details
2007	10 Days Out: Blues from the Backroads	Kenny Wayne Shepherd	Guest vocals ("Prison Blues")

== See also ==
- List of Piedmont blues musicians
