= The Rides =

American blues band

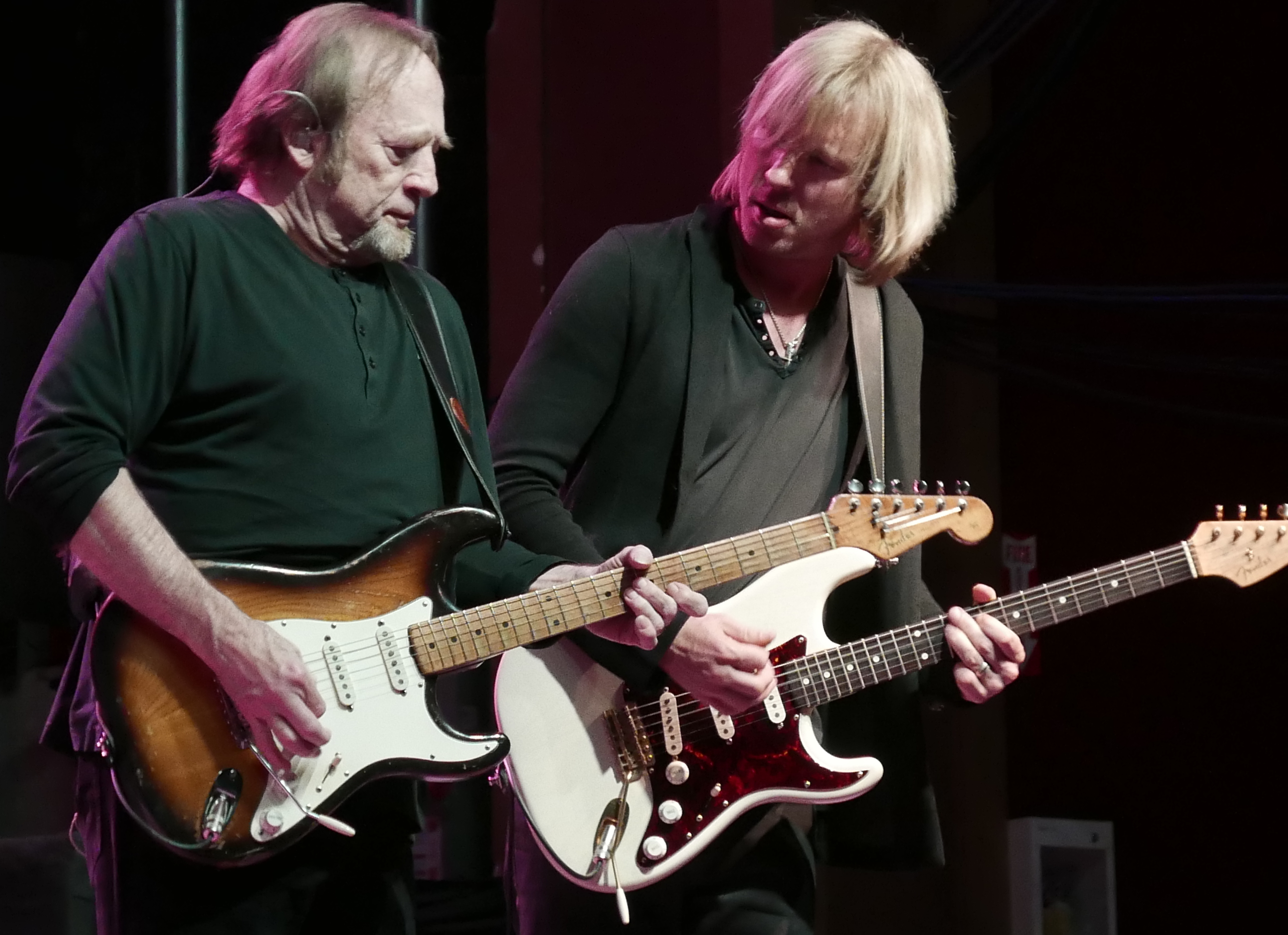
- Stephen Stills and Kenny Wayne Shepherd; The Rides in 2016

Background information
- Genres: Blues
- Years active: 2013–present
- Labels: 429 Records, Provogue Records
- Members: Stephen Stills; Kenny Wayne Shepherd
- Past members: Barry Goldberg

The Rides are an American blues supergroup, featuring guitarists Stephen Stills and Kenny Wayne Shepherd and keyboardist Barry Goldberg. The group formed in 2013 following a performance by the trio at a benefit led by Stills. Stills called the band “the blues band of my dreams”. The band toured in support of their debut album, Can't Get Enough, in fall 2013 backed by bassist Kevin McCormick (who played with Crosby, Stills and Nash in 2012) and Shepherd's longtime drummer Chris Layton. Their second album, Pierced Arrow, followed in 2016; it peaked at number one in the Billboard Top Blues Albums Chart.

Barry Goldberg died on January 22, 2025.

== Band members ==
Main members

- Stephen Stills - guitar, vocals
- Kenny Wayne Shepherd - guitar, vocals
- Barry Goldberg - keyboards (died 2025)

Touring musicians

- Kevin McCormick - bass
- Chris Layton - drums

== Discography ==
=== Studio albums ===
List of albums, with selected details and chart positions
Title	Album details	Peak chart positions												Sales
Title	Album details	US	US Blues	AUT	BEL WAL	BEL FLA	GER	FRA	NLD	NOR	SWE	SWI	UK	Sales
Can't Get Enough	Released: August 23, 2013; Label: 429 Records	42	1	54	144	—	15	—	69	17	43	88	87	US: 35,000
Pierced Arrow	Released: May 6, 2016; Label: Provogue Records	152	1	—	143	114	35	161	91	—	—	51	—	
"—" denotes a recording that did not chart or was not released in that territory.
