= Bryan Lee =

American blues musician (1943–2020)

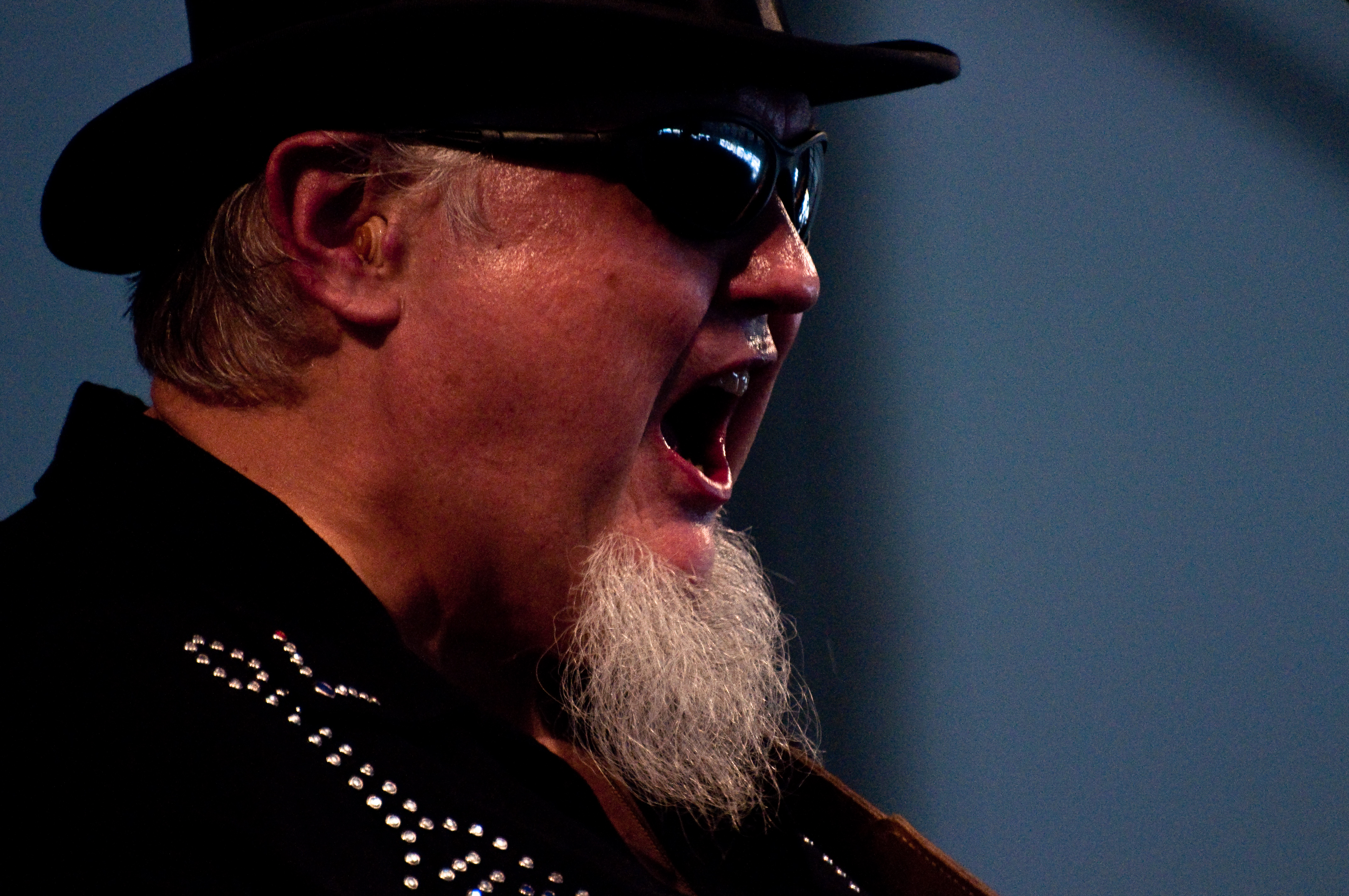
- Lee at the New Orleans Jazz Festival 2010

Background information
- Also known as: Braille Blues Daddy* Blind Giant of the Blues*
- Born: March 16, 1943; Two Rivers, Wisconsin, U.S.
- Died: August 21, 2020 (aged 77)
- Genres: Blues
- Occupation: Musician
- Instruments: Guitar, vocals
- Years active: 1972–2020
- Labels: Justin Time; Severn
- Past members: Bruce Koenig (Hammond B3)* John Laws (bass)* Steve Laws (guitar)* Rich Feldman (saxophones)*
- Website: braillebluesdaddy.com

Bryan Lee (March 16, 1943 – August 21, 2020) was an American blues guitarist and singer based in New Orleans, Louisiana. He was also known by the nickname 'Braille Blues Daddy' and was a fixture on Bourbon Street since the 1980s.

== Early life ==
Bryan Leroy Kumbalek (better known as Bryan Lee) was born on March 16, 1943, in Two Rivers, Wisconsin, United States, and completely lost his eyesight by the age of eight. His avid interest in early rock and blues was fostered through the 1950s by late night listening sessions via the Nashville-based radio station WLAC-AM, where he first encountered the sounds of Elmore James, Albert King and Albert Collins. By his late teens, Lee was playing rhythm guitar in a regional band called The Glaciers that covered Elvis Presley, Little Richard and Chuck Berry material.

== Career ==
Through the 1960s, Lee's interest turned to Chicago blues and he soon found himself immersed in that scene, opening for some of his boyhood heroes. In 1979 he released his first album named Beauty Isn't Always Visual.

In January 1982, Lee moved to New Orleans, eventually landing a steady gig at the Old Absinthe House on Bourbon Street becoming a favorite of tourists in the city's French Quarter. For the next 14 years, Lee and his Jump Street Five played five nights a week at that popular bar, developing a huge following and a solid reputation.

== Later life and death ==
To the end of his life, Lee continued to perform in New Orleans. He also toured several times a year in the Midwest, Eastern Seaboard, Rocky Mountain States and recently Europe and Brazil. Lee appeared with Kenny Wayne Shepherd as the musical guest on The Tonight Show with Jay Leno on February 14, 2007.

Bryan died on August 21, 2020, in Sarasota, United States, at the age of 77. He had been dealing with several serious health conditions, including complications affecting his lungs, heart, and kidneys, prior to his death.

== Discography ==
=== Albums ===
- 1979 Beauty Isn't Always Visual
- 1984 Bourbon Street Beat
- 1991 The Blues Is... (Justin Time)
- 1993 Memphis Bound (Justin Time)
- 1995 Braille Blues Daddy (Justin Time)
- 1995 Heat Seeking Missile (Justin Time)
- 1997 Live at the Old Absinthe House Bar: Friday Night (Justin Time)
- 1998 Live at the Old Absinthe House Bar, Vol. 2: Saturday (Justin Time)
- 2000 Crawfish Lady (Justin Time)
- 2002 Six String Therapy (Justin Time)
- 2005 Live and Dangerous (Justin Time)
- 2007 Katrina Was Her Name (Justin Time)
- 2009 My Lady Don't Love My Lady (Justin Time)
- 2010 Old School Blues
- 2011 Live from Sao Paulo
- 2013 Play One for Me (Severn Records)
- 2018 Sanctuary (Earrelevant Records)

=== Compilation albums ===
- 2003 Bryan Lee's Greatest Hits (Justin Time)

=== DVDs ===
- 2006 Live and Dangerous (Justin Time)
  - Track list :
  1. Intro
  2. The Bounce 4:30
  3. The Walk 3:40
  4. Smokin Woman 4:32
  5. That Ain't Right 6:41
  6. Second Line Home 5:53
  7. Rocket 88 5:13
  8. Blues on My Mind 4:55
  9. Sugaree 3:38
  10. Don't Take My Blindness For Weakness 7:15
  11. Gave You What You Wanted 6:23
  12. No Need To Worry 5:50
  13. Hug Me Till It Hurts 7:05
  14. Six String Therapy 15:14
  15. Memphis Bound 12:15
