= Henry Townsend (musician) =

American blues singer, guitarist and pianist (1909–2006)

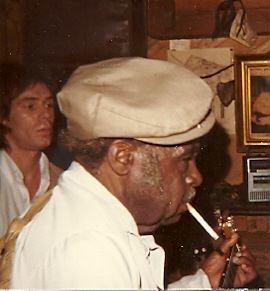
- Townsend performing in St. Louis, 1983

Background information
- Born: Henry Jesse James Townsend; October 27, 1909; Shelby, Mississippi, U.S.
- Died: September 24, 2006 (aged 96) Mequon, Wisconsin, U.S.
- Genres: Blues
- Occupations: Singer, musician
- Instruments: Guitar, piano
- Years active: 1920s–2000s

Henry "Mule" Townsend (born Henry Jesse James Townsend; October 27, 1909 – September 24, 2006) was an American blues singer, guitarist and pianist.

== Career ==
Townsend was born Henry Jesse James Townsend in Shelby, Mississippi to Allen and Omelia Townsend. His father was a blues musician who played guitar and accordion. When Henry was young, his family moved near Cairo, Illinois. Henry left home at the age of nine because of his abusive father and hoboed his way to St. Louis, Missouri. He learned guitar while in his early teens from a locally renowned blues guitarist known as Dudlow Joe. With aspirations to earn a living with his guitar, Townsend also worked as an auto mechanic, a shoe shiner, a hotel manager, and a salesman.

By the late 1920s he had begun touring and recording with the pianist Walter Davis and had acquired the nickname Mule, because he was sturdy in both physique and character. In St. Louis, he worked with some of the early blues pioneers, including J. D. Short. During this time period, he also learned to play the piano.

Townsend was one of the only artists known to have recorded in nine consecutive decades. He first recorded in 1929, for Columbia Records in Chicago, and remained active up to 2006. He performed on 35 recordings in 1935 alone. By the mid-1990s, Townsend and his one-time collaborator Yank Rachell were the only active blues artists whose careers had started in the 1920s. He recorded on several different labels, including Columbia, Bluesville Records, and Folkways Records.

By the mid-1950s, the popularity of the St. Louis style of blues had begun to wane in the United States, so Townsend worked in Europe where he felt his music was more appreciated. His European concerts drew large audiences, and he also appeared at many festivals. Townsend said wryly that he has been "rediscovered three or four times".

Known for his articulate manner and sharp memory, Townsend was a valued source for blues researchers. Paul Oliver recorded him in 1960 and drew on his accounts extensively in Conversations with the Blues (1967), which was inducted into the Blues Hall of Fame in 1991 under Classics of Blues Literature. Three decades later, Bill Greensmith edited thirty hours of taped interviews with Townsend into the autobiography A Blues Life, offering a detailed account of the blues scene in St. Louis and East St. Louis during its peak.

In 1979, Bob West recorded Townsend in St. Louis. That recording was released on CD in 2002 on Arcola Records as The Real St. Louis Blues.

Townsend died on September 24, 2006, at the age of 96, at St. Mary's Ozaukee Hospital, in Mequon, Wisconsin, just hours after having been the first person to be presented with a "key" in Grafton's Paramount Plaza Walk of Fame.

While [Henry Townsend] did not scorn his old recordings, he had no taste for spending his later years simply recreating them.
Blues, for him, was a living medium, and he continued to express himself in it, most remarkably in his songwriting.
—Tony Russell, The Guardian

Having served as a private in the United States Army Air Forces during World War II, Townsend was interred at Jefferson Barracks National Cemetery on October 2, 2006.

== Selected discography ==
- 1966: Blues Rediscoveries (Folkways Records)
- 1970: The Country Blues: Vol. 2 (Folkways Records)
- 1973: Henry T. Music Man (Adelphi Records AD1016)
- 1980: Mule (Nighthawk)
- 1984: The Blues in St. Louis, Vol. 3: Henry Townsend (Folkways Records)
- 1998: The 88 Blues (Blueberry Hill Records)
- 2001: The Real St. Louis Blues (Arcola Records, recorded 1979)
- 2003: Classic Blues from Smithsonian Folkways (Smithsonian Folkways)
- 2004: My Story (APO Records)
- 2007: Last of the Great Mississippi Delta Bluesmen: Live in Dallas (Blue Shoe Project)
- 2008: Classic Piano Blues from Smithsonian Folkways (Smithsonian Folkways)
- 2015: Original St. Louis Blues Live (Wolf Records, recorded 1980)

== Filmography ==
- 1970, reissued 1986: Blues Like Showers of Rain
- 1999: Hellhounds on My Trail: The Afterlife of Robert Johnson (directed by Robert Mugge)
- 2007: 10 Days Out: Blues From the Backroads
- unknown date: The Devil's Music: A History of the Blues

== Awards and honors ==
In 1980, Townsend's album Mule was nominated in the first national Blues Music Awards in the Traditional Blues Album category.

In 1982, his album St. Louis Blues (with his wife Vernell Townsend) was nominated for a Blues Music Award in the Traditional Blues Album category.

Townsend was a recipient of a 1985 National Heritage Fellowship awarded by the National Endowment for the Arts, which is the United States government's highest honor in the folk and traditional arts.

In 1995 he was inducted into the St. Louis Walk of Fame.

Townsend was inducted into the Blues Hall of Fame in 1999, and won a Grammy in 2006 for his contributions to the Martin Scorsese-produced series The Blues.

On February 10, 2008, Townsend was posthumously awarded a Grammy, his first, at the 50th Annual Grammy Awards. The award, in the category Best Traditional Blues Album, was given for his performances on Last of the Great Mississippi Delta Bluesmen: Live In Dallas, released by the Blue Shoe Project. Townsend's son, Alonzo Townsend, accepted the award on his behalf.

On December 4, 2009, a marker commemorating Townsend was added to the Mississippi Blues Trail.

In 2026, Townsend was posthumously inducted into the Blues Hall of Fame.

== See also ==
- List of blues musicians
- Chicago Blues Festival
- Kentuckiana Blues Society
