= Cyndi Lauper discography =

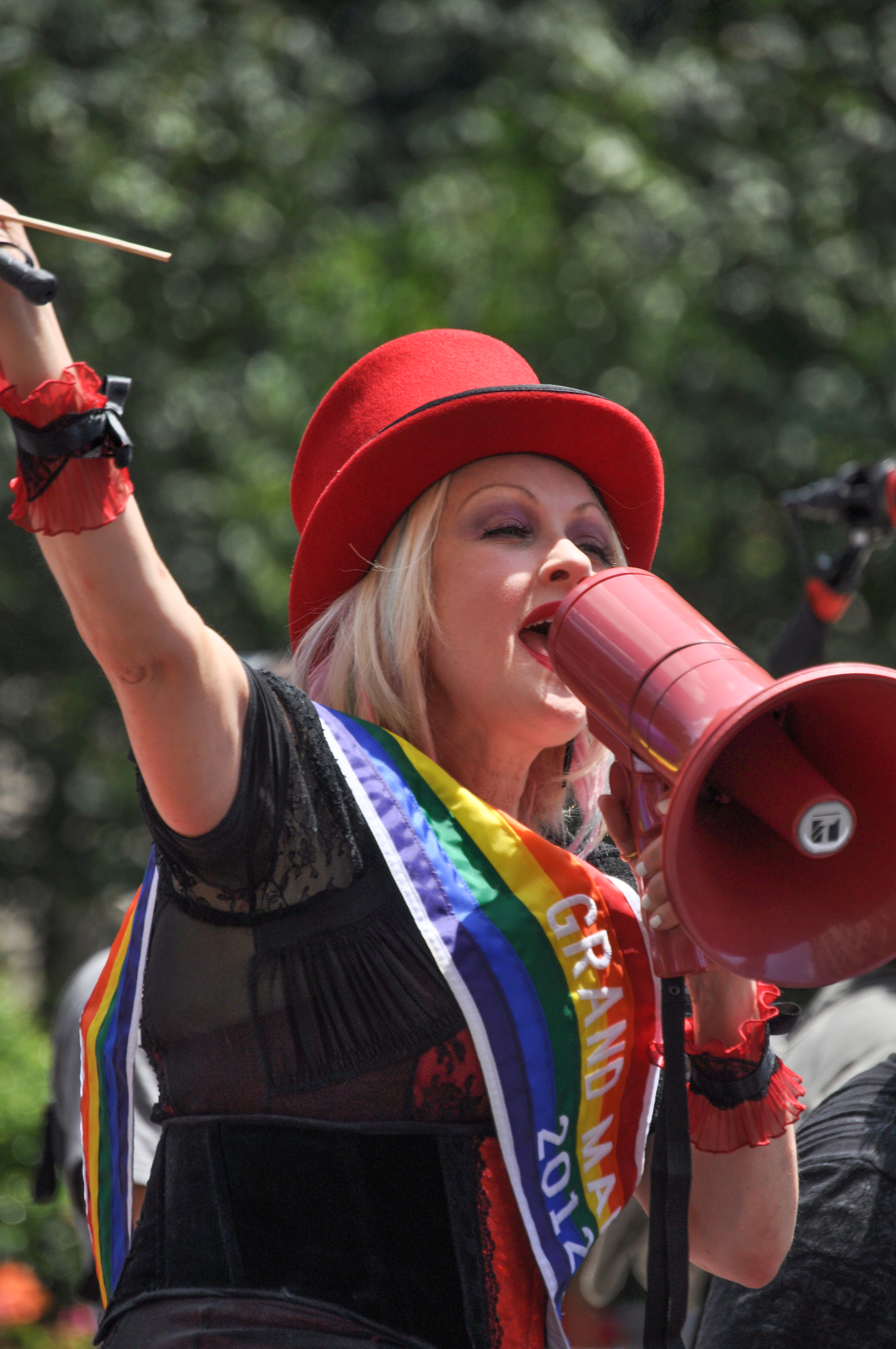
- Lauper in 2012
- Studio albums: 12
- Extended plays: 4
- Compilation albums: 15
- Singles: 54
- Video albums: 7
- Music videos: 33

American singer Cyndi Lauper has released twelve studio albums, fifteen compilation albums, seven video albums and fifty-four singles. Worldwide, Lauper has sold approximately 50 million albums, singles and DVDs. According to the RIAA, she has sold 9.5 million certified albums in the United States with She's So Unusual being her biggest seller (7× Platinum as of 2023).

Lauper was a founding member of Blue Angel, who released their debut album in 1980 on Polydor Records. The album was unsuccessful, causing the band to break up and Lauper to file for bankruptcy. In 1983, Lauper obtained a contract with Portrait Records, and her debut solo album, She's So Unusual, was released. The album was a major success, achieving platinum and gold certification around the world and spawning the hits "Girls Just Want to Have Fun", "Time After Time", "All Through the Night" and "She Bop". In 1985, Lauper released "The Goonies 'R' Good Enough", a single from the soundtrack to The Goonies, and her second album, True Colors, was released in 1986. True Colors was another successful album, along with the single of the same name and "Change of Heart". A starring role in the film Vibes in 1988 led to the release of "Hole in My Heart (All the Way to China)", which was a hit in Australia and New Zealand. Lauper's third album, A Night to Remember, was released in 1989. This album was less successful, despite the popularity of the first single, "I Drove All Night". The following single, "My First Night Without You", managed to chart in the top 60 in the United States.

In 1992, Lauper appeared in the English version of Starmania, a French rock opera. She released a single from the musical, "The World Is Stone", which was a major hit in several countries, particularly France. Her album Hat Full of Stars was released in 1993 on Epic Records, attaining gold certification in France and Japan. Lauper's greatest hits compilation, Twelve Deadly Cyns...and Then Some, was released in 1994, with the re-recorded version of "Girls Just Want to Have Fun" reaching number four in the United Kingdom and New Zealand. A compilation of Lauper's music videos and an interview was released at the same time on VHS. In 1996, she released Sisters of Avalon, and an original album of Christmas songs, Merry Christmas...Have a Nice Life in 1998. These two albums were much less successful internationally than her previous releases, but both charted in Japan. Sisters of Avalon was also certified platinum in Japan.

In 2001, Lauper planned to release another album, Shine, but the record company folded. An extended play version of the album was released to counter Internet piracy, and the full album was released exclusively in Japan in 2004. In 2003, Lauper released her seventh studio album, At Last, and a live version in 2004 on DVD, Live... At Last. At Last is a set of covers that reinvent classic songs, such as the title track "At Last", "Walk On By" and "Stay". The live DVD achieved gold certification in the United States. In 2005, Lauper released The Body Acoustic, featuring new acoustic versions of her hits, such as a duet of "Time After Time" with Sarah McLachlan. Lauper's 2008 album, Bring Ya to the Brink, was her first release in seven years containing original material, and met with considerable success. In December 2008 she recorded the duet "A Christmas Duel" with Swedish pop band The Hives, released in Sweden only, where it reached number 4. Memphis Blues was released in 2010. It managed to be her highest-charting album on the Billboard 200 since True Colors in 1986, and spent 13 consecutive weeks at number one on the Billboard Blues chart, becoming the highest selling blues album of the year. So far, it has sold 600,000 copies worldwide. Her most recent album is Detour, released in 2016. It is a country and western album inspired by some of her favourite artists growing up including Patsy Cline. The album peaked at number 29 on the US Billboard 200. A documentary on Lauper's career titled Let the Canary Sing was released on Paramount+ in June 2024 along with a soundtrack for the documentary.

== Albums ==
=== Studio albums ===
Title	Album details	Peak chart positions										Certifications
Title	Album details	US	AUS	AUT	CAN	FRA	GER	JPN	SWE	SWI	UK	Certifications
She's So Unusual	Released: October 13, 1983; Label: Portrait, Epic; Format: LP, cassette, CD	4	3	5	1	14	23	5	22	8	16	RIAA: 7× Platinum; ARIA: Platinum; BPI: Gold; BVMI: Gold; IFPI SWI: Platinum; MC: 8× Platinum; SNEP: Gold; RMNZ: Gold
True Colors	Released: September 15, 1986; Label: Portrait, Epic; Format: LP, cassette, CD	4	1	15	7	13	18	2	20	8	25	RIAA: 2× Platinum; ARIA: Gold; BPI: Silver; MC: 2× Platinum; SNEP: Gold
A Night to Remember	Released: May 8, 1989; Label: Epic; Format: LP, cassette, CD	37	17	—	34	15	19	3	32	18	9	ARIA: Gold; MC: Gold; RIAJ: Platinum; SNEP: Gold
Hat Full of Stars	Released: June 30, 1993; Label: Epic; Format: LP, cassette, CD	112	102	—	68	9	52	15	—	32	56	RIAJ: Gold; SNEP: Gold
Sisters of Avalon	Released: November 23, 1996; Label: Epic; Format: Cassette, CD	188	—	45	—	—	—	15	—	—	59	RIAJ: Gold
Merry Christmas ... Have a Nice Life	Released: October 27, 1998; Label: Epic; Format: Cassette, CD, LP	—	—	—	—	—	—	75	—	—	—	
At Last	Released: November 18, 2003; Label: Daylight / Epic; Format: Cassette, CD	38	32	—	32	85	—	205	—	50	124	
Shine^{[A]}	Released: May 3, 2004 (Full LP in Japan); Released: May 2, 2002 (EP in US); Label: Epic; Format: CD	—	—	—	—	—	—	120	—	—	—	
The Body Acoustic	Released: November 8, 2005; Label: Daylight / Epic; Format: CD	112	175	60	—	190	—	42	—	86	55	
Bring Ya to the Brink	Released: May 27, 2008; Label: Epic; Format: CD	41	87	48	40	129	—	18	—	—	—	
Memphis Blues	Released: June 22, 2010; Label: Mercer Street / Downtown; Format: LP, CD	26	59	—	45	31	77	41	85	77	105	IMPALA: 2× Silver
Detour	Released: May 2, 2016; Label: Sire; Format: LP, CD	29	15	—	69	142	64	122	—	55	43	
"—" denotes items which were not released in that country or failed to chart.

=== Broadway cast album ===
Title	Album details	Peak chart positions	
Title	Album details	US	US Cast Albums
Kinky Boots	Released: May 28, 2013; Label: Masterworks Broadway	51	1

=== Compilation albums ===
Title	Album details	Peak chart positions										Certifications
Title	Album details	US	AUS	AUT	FRA	GER	JPN	NLD	NZL	SWI	UK	Certifications
The Best Remixes	Released: April 21, 1989; Label: Epic	—	—	—	—	—	61	—	—	—	—	RIAJ: Gold
Twelve Deadly Cyns...and Then Some	Released: 1994; Label: Epic	81	25	18	6	18	8	38	6	7	2	RIAA: Gold; ARIA: Gold; BPI: 2× Platinum; IFPI SWI: Gold; RIAJ: Million; SNEP: Platinum
Wanna Have Fun	Released: 1996; Label: Epic	—	—	—	—	—	—	—	—	—	—	
Time After Time: The Best of Cyndi Lauper	Released: 13 November 2000; Label: Epic	—	—	—	—	—	—	—	—	—	—	BPI: Gold
The Essential Cyndi Lauper	Released: 2003; Label: Sony BMG	—	—	—	—	—	29	—	—	—	—	
The Great Cyndi Lauper	Released: 2003; Label: Epic	—	—	—	—	—	—	—	—	—	—	ARIA: Gold
Hey Now! (Remixes & Rarities)	Released: 2005; Label: Sony BMG	—	—	—	—	—	—	—	—	—	—	
Collections	Released: 2008; Label: Sony BMG	—	131	—	—	—	—	—	—	—	—	
Floor Remixes	Released: February 18, 2009; Label: Epic	—	—	—	—	—	102	—	—	—	—	
Playlist: The Very Best of Cyndi Lauper	Released: March 31, 2009; Label: Legacy	—	—	—	—	—	—	—	—	—	—	
True Colors: The Best of Cyndi Lauper	Released: June 12, 2009; Label: Sony Camden	—	146	—	—	—	—	—	—	—	—	BPI: Gold
She's So Unusual: A 30th Anniversary Celebration	Released: March 31, 2014; Label: Sony	150	—	—	—	—	53	—	—	—	—	
Front and Center (She's So Unusual 30th Anniversary Live)	Released: March 30, 2015; Label: Sony Records International	—	—	—	—	—	238	—	—	—	—	
Japanese Singles Collection-Greatest Hits-	Released: August 28, 2019; Label: Sony	—	—	—	—	—	28	—	—	—	—	
Let the Canary Sing	Released: May 31, 2024; Label: Legacy	— (Note: Let the Canary Sing did not enter the US Billboard 200, but did peak at number 7 on the Top Soundtracks chart.)	—	—	182	—	—	—	—	—	—	
"—" denotes releases that did not chart or was not released.

== Extended plays ==
Title	EP details	Sales
Feels Like Christmas	Released: July 1, 2001; Label: Sony Special Product	
Shine	Released: May 2, 2002; Label: Epic, Oglio	US: 41,000
Shine Remixes	Released: July 2, 2002; Label: Epic, Oglio	
She's So Unusual: Remixed	Released: October 7, 2014; Label: Epic	

== Singles ==
Title	Year	Peak chart positions										Certifications	Album
Title	Year	US	AUS	AUT	CAN	FRA	GER	IRL	NLD	NZL	UK	Certifications	Album
"Girls Just Want to Have Fun"	1983	2	1	3	1	5	6	1	4	1	2	RIAA: 6× Platinum; BPI: 3× Platinum; BVMI: Gold; MC: 2× Platinum; RMNZ: 4× Platinum	She's So Unusual
"Time After Time"	1984	1	6	5	1	9	6	2	8	3	3	RIAA: 5× Platinum; BPI: Platinum; BVMI: Gold; MC: Platinum; RMNZ: 4× Platinum	She's So Unusual
"She Bop"	1984	3	6	5	3	34	19	—	41	6	46	RIAA: Gold; MC: Gold	She's So Unusual
"All Through the Night"	1984	5	17	5	7	—	35	—	—	19	64	MC: Gold; RIAA: Gold	She's So Unusual
"Money Changes Everything"	1984	27	19	—	23	—	54	—	—	14	108		She's So Unusual
"When You Were Mine"^{[B]}	1985	—	—	—	62	—	—	—	—	—	—		She's So Unusual
"The Goonies 'R' Good Enough"	1985	10	8	—	9	—	49	—	—	22	130	MC: Gold	The Goonies: Original Motion Picture Soundtrack
"True Colors"	1986	1	3	12	1	49	18	6	14	8	12	RIAA: Platinum; BPI: Gold; MC: Gold; RMNZ: Platinum	True Colors
"Change of Heart"	1986	3	15	—	13	8	—	—	—	41	67		True Colors
"What's Going On"	1987	12	52	—	30	—	—	—	39	30	57		True Colors
"Boy Blue"	1987	71	—	—	—	—	—	—	—	—	—		True Colors
"Maybe He'll Know"^{[C]}	1987	—	—	—	—	—	—	—	—	—	—		True Colors
"Hole in My Heart (All the Way to China)"	1988	54	8	—	86	—	—	—	—	8	—		Vibes (soundtrack)
"I Drove All Night"	1989	6	11	—	8	10	19	13	54	10	7	BPI: Silver	A Night to Remember
"My First Night Without You"	1989	62	47	—	—	46	—	28	—	—	53		A Night to Remember
"Heading West"^{[D]}	1989	—	117	—	—	—	—	—	—	—	68		A Night to Remember
"A Night to Remember"^{[E]}	1989	—	145	—	—	—	—	—	—	—	—		A Night to Remember
"Primitive"^{[F]}	1990	—	—	—	—	—	—	—	—	—	—		A Night to Remember
"Unconditional Love"^{[G]}	1991	—	—	—	—	—	—	—	—	—	—		A Night to Remember
"The World Is Stone"	1992	—	106	—	—	2	100	16	—	—	15		Tycoon
"Who Let in the Rain"	1993	—	109	—	76	—	—	—	—	12	32		Hat Full of Stars
"That's What I Think"	1993	—	—	—	—	—	—	—	—	—	31		Hat Full of Stars
"Sally's Pigeons"^{[H]}	1993	—	—	—	—	—	—	—	—	—	—		Hat Full of Stars
"Hat Full of Stars"^{[I]}	1993	—	—	—	—	—	—	—	—	—	—		Hat Full of Stars
"Hey Now (Girls Just Want to Have Fun)"	1994	87	62	—	—	3	56	10	—	4	4	BPI: Silver	Twelve Deadly Cyns...and Then Some
"I'm Gonna Be Strong"	1994	—	—	—	—	—	—	—	—	—	37		Twelve Deadly Cyns...and Then Some
"Come on Home"	1995	—	—	—	—	—	—	—	—	—	39		Twelve Deadly Cyns...and Then Some
"You Don't Know"	1996	—	177	—	—	—	—	—	—	—	27		Sisters of Avalon
"Sisters of Avalon"^{[I]}	1997	—	—	—	—	—	—	—	—	—	—		Sisters of Avalon
"Ballad of Cleo and Joe"^{[J]}	1997	—	—	—	—	—	—	—	—	—	—		Sisters of Avalon
"Early Christmas Morning"^{[I]}	1998	—	—	—	—	—	—	—	—	—	—		Merry Christmas... Have a Nice Life
"Disco Inferno"	1999	—	—	—	—	—	—	—	—	—	—		A Night at the Roxbury: Music from the Motion Picture
"Shine"	2002	—	—	—	—	—	—	—	—	—	—		Shine
"Walk On By"^{[J]}	2004	—	—	—	—	—	—	—	—	—	—		At Last
"Stay"	2004	—	—	—	—	—	—	—	—	—	—		At Last
"Until You Come Back to Me (That's What I'm Gonna Do)"	2004	—	—	—	—	—	—	—	—	—	—		At Last
"Time After Time" (featuring Sarah McLachlan)	2005	—	102	—	—	170	—	—	—	—	—		The Body Acoustic
"Above the Clouds" (featuring Jeff Beck)	2005	—	—	—	—	—	—	—	—	—	—		The Body Acoustic
"Set Your Heart"^{[I]}	2008	—	—	—	—	—	—	—	—	—	—		Bring Ya to the Brink
"Same Ol' Story"	2008	—	—	—	—	—	—	—	—	—	—		Bring Ya to the Brink
"Into the Nightlife"	2008	—	82	—	—	—	—	—	—	—	—		Bring Ya to the Brink
"A Christmas Duel" (featuring The Hives)	2008	—	—	—	—	—	—	—	—	—	—		Non-album single
"Girls Just Wanna Set Your Heart"^{[I]}	2009	—	—	—	—	—	—	—	—	—	—		Floor Remixes
"Just Your Fool"	2010	—	—	—	—	—	—	—	—	—	—		Memphis Blues
"Early in the Mornin'"	2010	—	—	—	—	—	—	—	—	—	—		Memphis Blues
"Crossroads"	2011	—	—	—	—	—	—	—	—	—	—		Memphis Blues
"Home for the Holidays" (featuring Norah Jones)	2011	—	—	—	—	—	—	—	—	—	—		Non-album singles
"Blue Christmas"	2011	—	—	—	—	—	—	—	—	—	—		Non-album singles
"Sex Is in the Heel"	2012	—	—	—	—	—	—	—	—	—	—		Kinky Boots
"Hard Candy Christmas"	2015	—	—	—	—	—	—	—	—	—	—		Detour
"Funnel of Love"	2016	—	—	—	—	—	—	—	—	—	—		Detour
"Hope"^{[K]}	2019	—	—	—	—	—	—	—	—	—	—		Japanese Single Collection – Greatest Hits
"Sally's Pigeons" (2022 Redux)	2022	—	—	—	—	—	—	—	—	—	—		Non-album single
"Gonna Be You" (with Dolly Parton, Belinda Carlisle, Gloria Estefan and Debbie Harry)	2023	—	—	—	—	—	—	—	—	—	—		80 for Brady
"Oh Dolores"	2023	—	—	—	—	—	—	—	—	—	—		The Horror of Dolores Roach
"—" denotes a release that did not chart or was not released.

=== As featured artist ===
Title	Year	Peak chart positions										Certifications	Album
Title	Year	US	AUS	AUT	CAN	FRA	NLD	NZL	SWE	SWI	UK	Certifications	Album
"We Are the World" (as part of USA for Africa)	1985	1	1	2	1	1	1	1	1	1	1	RIAA: 4× Platinum; BPI: Silver; MC: 3× Platinum	We Are the World
"Another Brick in the Wall (Part Two)" (Roger Waters featuring Cyndi Lauper)	1990	—	—	—	—	—	—	—	—	—	82		The Wall – Live in Berlin

== Other charted songs ==
Title	Year	Peak chart positions	Album
Title	Year	ITA	Album
"Wild Women Don't Have the Blues"	2010	43	Memphis Blues

== B-sides ==
Title	Year	Single (A-side)	Album
"Right Track, Wrong Train"	1983	"Girls Just Want to Have Fun"	single only
"I'll Kiss You"	1984	"Time After Time"	She's So Unusual
"I'll Kiss You"	1984	"When You Were Mine" (Japan)	She's So Unusual
"Witness"	1984	"Girls Just Want to Have Fun" (UK 12")	She's So Unusual
"Witness"	1984	"She Bop"	She's So Unusual
"Witness"	1984	"All Through the Night"	She's So Unusual
"Witness"	1984	"Change of Heart"	She's So Unusual
"He's So Unusual"	1984	"All Through the Night" (Japan)	She's So Unusual
"He's So Unusual"	1984	"Money Changes Everything" (UK)	She's So Unusual
"Yeah Yeah"	1984	"All Through the Night" (Japan)	She's So Unusual
"Yeah Yeah"	1984	"Money Changes Everything" (UK)	She's So Unusual
"Yeah Yeah"	1984	"When You Were Mine" (Canada)	She's So Unusual
"What a Thrill"	1985	"The Goonies 'R' Good Enough"	The Goonies
"What a Thrill"	1985	"Change of Heart" (UK)	The Goonies
"Heading for the Moon"	1986	"True Colors"	single only
"One Track Mind"	1987	"What's Going On"	True Colors
"One Track Mind"	1987	"Maybe He'll Know" (12")	True Colors
"The Faraway Nearby"	1987	"Boy Blue"	True Colors
"Calm Inside the Storm"	1987	"Maybe He'll Know" (12")	True Colors
"Calm Inside the Storm"	1987	"Heading West" (Europe and Japan)	True Colors
"Maybe He'll Know" (Remix)	1988	"Hole in My Heart (All the Way to China)" (12" and CD)	True Colors
"Maybe He'll Know" (Remix)	1989	"I Drove All Night"	True Colors
"Unabbreviated Love"	1989	"My First Night Without You"	single only
"Iko Iko"	1989	"My First Night Without You" (UK Picture Disc CD)	True Colors
"Insecurious"	1989	"Heading West" (UK)	A Night to Remember
"Insecurious"	1989	"A Night to Remember"	A Night to Remember
"Insecurious"	1990	"Primitive" (12" and Maxi CD)	A Night to Remember
"Learn to Live Alone"	1992	"The World Is Stone"	Tycoon
"Cold"	1993	"Who Let in the Rain"	single only
"Cold"	1993	"Sally's Pigeons"	single only
"Like I Used To"	1993	"Who Let in the Rain" (12" and Maxi CD)	Hat Full of Stars
"Like I Used To"	1993	"Sally's Pigeons" (12" and Maxi CD)	Hat Full of Stars
"Hat Full of Stars"	1994	"Hey Now (Girls Just Want to Have Fun)" (UK Cassette)	Hat Full of Stars
"Feels Like Christmas"	1994	"Sally's Pigeons" (Re-Release)	Hat Full of Stars
"Feels Like Christmas"	1994	"I'm Gonna Be Strong" (Japan)	Hat Full of Stars
"Someone Like Me"	1994	"Sally's Pigeons" (Re-Release)	Hat Full of Stars
"A Part Hate"	1995	"I'm Gonna Be Strong"	Hat Full of Stars
"Broken Glass"	1995	"I'm Gonna Be Strong" (Maxi CD)	Hat Full of Stars
"Dear John"	1995	"I'm Gonna Be Strong" (Maxi CD)	Hat Full of Stars
"Product of Misery"	1995	"I'm Gonna Be Strong" (UK CD2)	Hat Full of Stars
"Mother" (Extended version)	1996	"You Don't Know"	Sisters of Avalon
"Unhook the Stars"	1997	"Sisters of Avalon"	Sisters of Avalon
"Higher Plane"	2003	"Shine"	Shine
"Misty Blue"	2016	"Funnel of Love"	Detour

== Video releases ==
Title	Details	US Music Video Sales	UK Music Videos	Certifications
Cyndi Lauper in Paris	Released: 1987; Studio: PolyGram; Formats: VHS, LaserDisc, DVD (Only Brazil)	13	—	
Twelve Deadly Cyns... and Then Some	Released: 1995 (VHS), 2000 (DVD); Studio: Sony; Formats: VHS, DVD	12	26	
Live... At Last	Released: 2004; Studio: Sony; Formats: DVD	15	—	RIAA: Gold
The Body Acoustic/DualDisc	Released: 2005; Studio: Daylight / Epic; Formats: DVD (with CD on flip side)	—	—	
To Memphis, with Love	Released: 2011; Studio: Megaforce; Formats: DVD	9	—	
Japanese Singles Collection – Greatest Hits	Released: 2019; Studio: Sony; Formats: DVD (with CD) (Only Japan)	—	—	
Let the Canary Sing	Released: 2024; Studio: Paramount+; Formats: streaming	—	—	

== Music videos ==
Title	Year	Director
"Girls Just Want to Have Fun"	1983	Edd Griles
"Time After Time"	1984	Edd Griles
"She Bop"	1984	Edd Griles
"Money Changes Everything"	1984	Patricia Birch
"The Goonies 'R' Good Enough"	1985	Richard Donner
"True Colors"	1986	Patricia Birch
"Change of Heart"	1986	Andy Morahan
"What's Going On"	1987	Andy Morahan
"Boy Blue"	1987	Andy Morahan
"Hole in My Heart (All the Way to China)"	1988	Edd Griles
"I Drove All Night"	1989	Scott Kalvert and Cyndi Lauper
"My First Night Without You"	1989	Larry Jordan
"Heading West"	1989	Larry Jordan
"A Night to Remember"	1989	Larry Jordan
"The World Is Stone"	1992	John Maybury
"Who Let in the Rain"	1993	John Diaz and Cyndi Lauper
"Sally's Pigeons"	1993	Cyndi Lauper
"That's What I Think"	1993	Cyndi Lauper
"Hey Now (Girls Just Want to Have Fun)"	1994	Cyndi Lauper
"I'm Gonna Be Strong"	1995	Cyndi Lauper
"You Don't Know"	1997	Cyndi Lauper
"Sisters of Avalon"	1997	Cyndi Lauper
"Ballad of Cleo and Joe"	1997	Unknown
"At Last"	2003	Unknown
"Stay"	2003	Unknown
"Above the Clouds"	2005	Unknown
"She Bop" (acoustic version)	2005	Unknown
"Money Changes Everything" (acoustic version)	2005	Unknown
"Shine" (acoustic version)	2005	Unknown
"Into the Nightlife"	2008	Cyndi Lauper
"Girls Just Wanna Set Your Heart"	2009	Karl Giant
Truly Brave with Sara Bareilles	2014	Unknown
"Funnel of Love"	2016	Cyndi Lauper
"Hope"	2017	Unknown

== Notes ==
- A Planned for release in 2001 but was shelved due to label going bankrupt. Eventually released as an EP in 2002 and a full album only in Japan.
- B Only released in Canada and Japan.
- C Only released in the Netherlands.
- D Released in Europe, Australia and Japan.
- E Released in North America and Australia.
- F Only released in Europe.
- G Only released in Hong Kong. As an album track, it was able to chart at number 66 on the Tokio Hot 100.
- H Only released in Europe. Later re-released in 1995.
- I Only released in Japan.
- J Only released in the United States.
- K Music video first released in 2017. Single officially released in 2019.

== See also ==
- Blue Angel (band)#Discography
