= The Great Cyndi Lauper =

Greatest hits album by Cyndi Lauper
- Released: October 31, 2003
- Recorded: 1983–1997
- Genre: Pop/Rock
- Label: Rajon

Cyndi Lauper chronology
The Essential Cyndi Lauper (2003)	The Great Cyndi Lauper (2003)	At Last (2003)

The Great Cyndi Lauper is a 2003 greatest hits compilation, released by American singer Cyndi Lauper. It contains all of her greatest hits and other noteworthy tracks. It is also the second compilation that contains her soundtrack contribution "Hole in My Heart (All the Way to China)" from her 1988 film Vibes.

The album was certified Gold in Australia for sales of 35,000.

== Track listing ==
Disc 1

1. "Girls Just Want to Have Fun"
2. "Maybe He'll Know"
3. "Calm Inside the Storm"
4. "What's Going On"
5. "The Goonies 'R' Good Enough" +
6. "That's What I Think" (Single Edit)
7. "Broken Glass"
8. "Unhook the Stars"
9. "Money Changes Everything"
10. "True Colors"
11. "Time After Time"
12. "She Bop"
13. "When You Were Mine"
14. "I'm Gonna Be Strong"
15. "All Through the Night"

Disc 2

1. "Change of Heart"
2. "I Drove All Night" (includes 'Intro' from A Night To Remember album)
3. "Sally's Pigeons"
4. "Come on Home"
5. "Iko Iko"
6. "Hat Full of Stars"
7. "A Night to Remember"
8. "The World Is Stone" +
9. "Insecurious"
10. "You Don't Know"
11. "Cold" (B-side Who Let In The Rain single) ++
12. "Hole in My Heart (All the Way to China)" +
13. "Unconditional Love"
14. "Who Let in the Rain"

Disc 3

1. "Fall into Your Dreams"
2. "Fearless"
3. "Hot Gets a Little Cold"
4. "Witness"
5. "I'll Kiss You"
6. "911"
7. "The Ballad of Cleo and Joe"
8. "Sisters of Avalon"
9. "Unabbreviated Love" (B-side My First Night Without You single) ++
10. "What a Thrill" (B-side The Goonies R Good Enough single) +
11. "One Track Mind"
12. "I Don't Want to Be Your Friend"
13. "Yeah Yeah"
14. "Hey Now (Girls Just Want to Have Fun)"
- + = Non-album / Soundtrack song
- ++ = Single / EP only track

== Certifications ==
Region	Certification	Certified units/sales
Australia (ARIA)	Gold	35,000^{^}
^{^} Shipments figures based on certification alone.
