= The Essential Cyndi Lauper =

Compilation album by Cyndi Lauper
- Released: April 23, 2003
- Length: 59:47
- Label: Epic; Legacy
- Producer: Cyndi Lauper; Rick Chertoff; Lennie Petze; Mark Saunders; Jan Pulsford

Cyndi Lauper chronology
Shine (2002)	The Essential Cyndi Lauper (2003)	The Great Cyndi Lauper (2003)

Alternative covers
- 2008 Japanese edition

Professional ratings
Review scores
Source	Rating
Allmusic	3/5 stars

The Essential Cyndi Lauper is a compilation album by American singer-songwriter Cyndi Lauper, released as part of Sony BMG's The Essential series. It was released on April 23, 2003, via Epic Records and Legacy Recordings.

The compilation comprises 14 of Lauper's songs including her non-album 1985 single "The Goonies 'R' Good Enough" that is part of The Goonies: Original Motion Picture Soundtrack (1985). As of 2012, the compilation has sold 15,000 copies in the United States according to Nielsen SoundScan.

Five years after its initial release, Sony Music Entertainment Japan reissued the album accompanied with bonus DVD which features four music videos. The expanded edition debuted at number 29 on the Japan's Oricon, and became Lauper's eighth top-40 charting album in the country.

== Track listing ==
2003 track listing
No.	Title	Writer(s)	Original album	Length
1.	"Girls Just Want to Have Fun"	Robert Hazard	She's So Unusual (1983)	3:55
2.	"Money Changes Everything"	Tom Gray	She's So Unusual (1983)	5:03
3.	"Who Let in the Rain"	Cyndi Lauper; Allee Willis	Hat Full of Stars (1993)	4:37
4.	"She Bop"	Lauper; Gary Corbett; Rick Chertoff; Stephen Broughton Lunt	She's So Unusual (1983)	3:48
5.	"Time After Time"	Lauper; Rob Hyman	She's So Unusual (1983)	4:01
6.	"I Drove All Night"	Billy Steinberg; Tom Kelly	A Night to Remember (1989)	4:12
7.	"Hat Full of Stars"	Lauper; Nicky Holland	Hat Full of Stars (1993)	4:28
8.	"Change of Heart"	Lauper; Essra Mohawk	True Colors (1986)	4:25
9.	"Sisters of Avalon"	Lauper; Jan Pulsford	Sisters of Avalon (1996)	4:22
10.	"All Through the Night"	Jules Shear	She's So Unusual (1983)	4:29
11.	"When You Were Mine"	Prince	She's So Unusual (1983)	5:03
12.	"True Colors"	Steinberg; Kelly	True Colors	3:48
13.	"Unhook the Stars"	Lauper; Pulsford	Sisters of Avalon (1996)	3:58
14.	"The Goonies 'R' Good Enough" (Single Version)	Lauper; Lunt; Arthur Stead	The Goonies: Original Motion Picture Soundtrack (1985); originally meant for True Colors (1986)	3:38
Total length:				59:47

2003 Japanese track listing
No.	Title	Writer(s)	Original album	Length
15.	"Hey Now (Girls Just Want to Have Fun)"	Lauper; Lolly Vegas; Hazard	Twelve Deadly Cyns...and Then Some (1994)	3:53
Total length:				63:25

2007 Wal-Mart edition track listing
No.	Title	Writer(s)	Original album	Length
15.	"Shine"	Lauper; William Wittman	Shine (2004)	4:33
Total length:				64:20

2008 Japanese reissue track listing
No.	Title	Writer(s)	Original album	Length
16.	"Set Your Heart"	Lauper; Victor Carstarphen; Gene McFadden; Richard Morel; John Whitehead	Bring Ya to the Brink (2008)	3:43
Total length:				63:30

2008 Japanese bonus DVD
No.	Title	Director	Length
1.	"Girls Just Want to Have Fun"	Edd Griles
2.	Untitled	Edd Griles
3.	"True Colors"	Patricia Birch
4.	"I Drove All Night"	Cyndi Lauper; Scott Kalvert

== Chart positions ==
Year	Chart	Position
2004	Japanese Oricon Albums Chart	210
2008	Japanese Oricon Albums Chart	29

== Certifications and sales ==
Region	Certification	Certified units/sales
Brazil (Pro-Música Brasil)	Gold	50,000^{‡}
United States	—	15,000
^{‡} Sales+streaming figures based on certification alone.
