= Girls Just Wanna Have Fun Farewell Tour =

2024–2025 concert tour by Cyndi Lauper

- Tour by Cyndi Lauper
- Promotional poster for the tour
- Location: Asia; Australia; Europe; North America
- Start date: October 18, 2024
- End date: August 30, 2025 (Note: According to both cyndilauper.com and atlantisbahamas.com, Lauper's concert which was held at Atlantis Paradise Island in Paradicse Island, Bahamas on June 20, 2026 was a part of the tour as well)
- Legs: 3
- No. of shows: 69

Cyndi Lauper concert chronology
- Japan Tour 2019 (2019); Girls Just Wanna Have Fun Farewell Tour (2024–2025); Cyndi Lauper: Live in Las Vegas (2026–2027)

The Girls Just Wanna Have Fun Farewell Tour was the sixteenth concert tour by American musician Cyndi Lauper. The tour was named after her 1983 debut single "Girls Just Want to Have Fun" and has been described as her final major tour. The tour began on October 18, 2024 at the Bell Centre in Montreal, Canada and initially concluded on August 30, 2025 at the Hollywood Bowl in Los Angeles, United States, after 69 shows in four continents. However, the concert which was held at the Atlantis Paradise Island in Paradise Island, Bahamas on June 20, 2026 was considered to be a part of the tour as well.

== Background ==
In June 2024 Lauper announced the farewell tour, clarifying that she is not retiring and will be open to occasional performances, stating that she wanted to do an arena tour while she's "strong now, but [she doesn't] know what [she is] going to be like in four years." and that she really wants to celebrate with people and make it fun. It is her first world tour since the Detour Tour (2016) and her first all-arena tour since the True Colors World Tour (1986).

The tour coincides with her documentary Let the Canary Sing which premiered at Tribeca Festival in 2023. Legacy Records, the catalog division of Sony Music Entertainment, released a compilation album of the same name which is a "career-spanning collection" of Lauper's career.

== Promotion ==
To promote the tour Lauper appeared on Jimmy Kimmel Live! on June 5. She also played two greatest hits shows in the United Kingdom, one at the Royal Albert Hall in London and appearances at Glastonbury Festival 2024.

Pre-sale tickets went on sale on June 4, with the general sale beginning on June 7. Dates for the 2025 European leg of the tour went on sale starting June 28. The opening acts for the tour were announced on Lauper's website on October 1, along with a new show in Atlantic City, New Jersey on December 7. Dates for Australia and Japan were announced in October, with a second date in Tokyo added November 24th due to demand.

== Set list ==
This set list is that of the show at the Bell Centre in Montreal, Canada, on October 18, 2024. It does not represent all dates throughout the tour.

1. "She Bop"
2. "The Goonies 'R' Good Enough"
3. "When You Were Mine"
4. "I Drove All Night"
5. "Who Let in the Rain"
6. "Iko Iko"
7. "Funnel of Love"
8. "Sally's Pigeons"
9. "I'm Gonna Be Strong"
10. "Sisters of Avalon"
11. "Change of Heart"
12. "Time After Time"
13. "Money Changes Everything"
14. "Shine"
15. "True Colors"
16. "Girls Just Want to Have Fun"

== Tour dates ==
List of 2024 concerts
Date (2024)	City	Country	Venue	Opening act
October 18	Montreal	Canada	Bell Centre	Rêve
October 20	Toronto	Canada	Scotiabank Arena	Lu Kala
October 24	Detroit	United States	Fox Theatre	Lu Kala
October 26	Boston	United States	MGM Music Hall	Amanda Shires
October 27	Washington	United States	Capital One Arena	Amanda Shires
October 30	New York City	United States	Madison Square Garden	Elle King
November 1	Nashville	United States	Bridgestone Arena	Elle King
November 3	Columbus	United States	Value City Arena	Elle King
November 6	Tampa	United States	Amalie Arena	Emily Estefan
November 8	Hollywood	United States	Hard Rock Live	Emily Estefan
November 10	Atlanta	United States	State Farm Arena	Aly & AJ
November 12	Dallas	United States	American Airlines Center	Aly & AJ
November 14	Austin	United States	Moody Center	Aly & AJ
November 16	Houston	United States	Toyota Center	Aly & AJ
November 19	Phoenix	United States	Footprint Center	Daya
November 20	San Diego	United States	Viejas Arena	Daya
November 23	Inglewood	United States	Intuit Dome	Daya
November 24	Palm Desert	United States	Acrisure Arena	Trixie Mattel
November 26	San Francisco	United States	Chase Center	Trixie Mattel
November 30	Portland	United States	Moda Center	Gayle
December 1	Seattle	United States	Climate Pledge Arena	Gayle
December 4	Minneapolis	United States	Target Center	Gayle
December 5	Chicago	United States	United Center	Gayle
December 7	Atlantic City	United States	Hard Rock Live	Gayle

List of 2025 concerts
Date (2025)	City	Country	Venue	Opening act
February 8	Glasgow	Scotland	OVO Hydro	Tracy Young
February 9	Manchester	England	Co-op Live	—N/a
February 11	London	England	The O_{2} Arena	—N/a
February 14	Birmingham	England	Bp pulse LIVE	—N/a
February 16	Belfast	Ireland	SSE Arena	—N/a
February 19	Budapest	Hungary	László Papp Budapest Sports Arena	—N/a
February 21	Łódź	Poland	Atlas Arena	Tracy Young
February 23	Prague	Czech Republic	O_{2} Arena	—N/a
February 25	Berlin	Germany	Uber Arena	—N/a
February 26	Dusseldorf	Germany	PSD Bank Dome	Tracy Young
February 28	Paris	France	Accor Arena	—N/a
April 2	Melbourne	Australia	Rod Laver Arena	The Veronicas
April 5	Brisbane	Australia	Brisbane Entertainment Centre	The Veronicas
April 7	Newcastle	Australia	Newcastle Entertainment Centre	The Veronicas
April 8	Sydney	Australia	Qudos Bank Arena	The Veronicas
April 10	Adelaide	Australia	Adelaide Entertainment Centre	The Veronicas
April 12	Perth	Australia	RAC Arena	The Veronicas
April 19	Osaka	Japan	Asue Arena	—N/a
April 22	Tokyo	Japan	Nippon Budokan	—N/a
April 23	Tokyo	Japan	Nippon Budokan	—N/a
April 25	Tokyo	Japan	Nippon Budokan	—N/a
July 17	Mansfield	United States	Xfinity Center	Jake Wesley Rogers
July 19	Wantagh	United States	Jones Beach Theater	Jake Wesley Rogers
July 20	Philadelphia	United States	TD Pavilion	Jake Wesley Rogers
July 22	Raleigh	United States	Coastal Credit Union Music Park	Jake Wesley Rogers
July 24	Bristow	United States	Jiffy Lube Live	Jake Wesley Rogers
July 25	Bethel	United States	Bethel Woods Center for the Arts	Jake Wesley Rogers
July 27	Toronto	Canada	Budweiser Stage	Jake Wesley Rogers
July 29	Cincinnati	United States	Riverbend Music Center	Jake Wesley Rogers
July 30	Cuyahoga Falls	United States	Blossom Music Center	Jake Wesley Rogers
August 1	Independence Township	United States	Pine Knob Music Theatre	Jake Wesley Rogers
August 3	Milwaukee	United States	American Family Insurance Amphitheater	Jake Wesley Rogers
August 5	Tinley Park	United States	Credit Union 1 Amphitheatre	Jake Wesley Rogers
August 7	Noblesville	United States	Ruoff Music Center	Jake Wesley Rogers
August 9	Bonner Springs	United States	Sandstone Amphitheater	Jake Wesley Rogers
August 12	Greenwood Village	United States	Fiddler's Green Amphitheatre	Jake Wesley Rogers
August 14	West Valley City	United States	Utah First Credit Union Amphitheatre	Jake Wesley Rogers
August 17	Ridgefield	United States	RV Inn Style Resorts Amphitheater	Jake Wesley Rogers
August 19	Auburn	United States	White River Amphitheatre	Jake Wesley Rogers
August 21	Vancouver	Canada	Rogers Arena	Jake Wesley Rogers
August 23	Wheatland	United States	Toyota Amphitheatre	Jake Wesley Rogers
August 24	Mountain View	United States	Shoreline Amphitheatre	Jake Wesley Rogers
August 29	Los Angeles	United States	Hollywood Bowl	Jake Wesley Rogers
August 30	Los Angeles	United States	Hollywood Bowl	Jake Wesley Rogers

Cancellations and rescheduled shows

July 15, 2025	Darien, New York	Darien Lake Amphitheatre	Cancelled
August 26	Concord	Concord Pavilion	Cancelled
