= Twelve Deadly Cyns...and Then Some =

Greatest hits album by Cyndi Lauper
- Released: July 18, 1994
- Genres: Pop; dance
- Length: 57:52
- Label: Epic
- Producer: Cyndi Lauper

Cyndi Lauper chronology
Hat Full of Stars (1993)	Twelve Deadly Cyns...and Then Some (1994)	Sisters of Avalon (1996)

Singles from Twelve Deadly Cyns...and Then Some
- 1. "(Hey Now) Girls Just Want to Have Fun" Released: September 5, 1994; 2. "I'm Gonna Be Strong" Released: January 30, 1995 (UK); 3. "Come On Home" Released: August 14, 1995 (UK)

Twelve Deadly Cyns...and Then Some is a greatest hits album by the American singer Cyndi Lauper, released in the UK on August 22, 1994, and in the US on July 18, 1995, through Epic Records. It contains a collection of singles from the singer's first four studio albums. It also contains three new songs: "(Hey Now) Girls Just Want to Have Fun", "I'm Gonna Be Strong" and "Come On Home", all of which were released as singles. To promote the record, the singer embarked on a worldwide tour. A video album was simultaneously released and contained music videos of fourteen songs.

The album was a commercial success and has sold more than 4 million copies worldwide.

== Background ==
After the release of Cyndi Lauper's third album A Night to Remember, in 1989, Epic was disappointed by its poor reception and the singer's declining in popularity in the charts and record sales. Fearing another failure, Epic had the idea of releasing a compilation of the singer's greatest hits.

A different greatest-hits album titled 13 Deadly Cyns was considered to be released in 1992 prior to the release of Cyndi's fourth album Hat Full of Stars, with a promo tape being released in the UK that year. This version of the album included all singles (worldwide and regional) from Cyndi's first three albums (except "When You Were Mine", "Boy Blue" and "Primitive") as well as her 1992 single "The World Is Stone". The shorter 7" studio edit of "Money Changes Everything" was included on this promotional release instead of the album version which would appear on the final release.

The idea was badly received by Lauper, who believed she had few albums and singles released. As a result, in agreement with the label, she decided that after her next album, which she was hopeful about, it would be the right time to release a greatest hits.

== Production and content ==
The album's lead single was "Hey Now (Girls Just Wanna Have Fun)", which combines the original lyrics of "Girls Just Wanna Have Fun" with a new chorus based on the 1974 hit "Come and Get Your Love" by Redbone. A music video featuring drag queens was shot to accompany this single and it aired heavily on television. The song was also featured in the film To Wong Foo, Thanks for Everything! Julie Newmar.

The album's second single, "Come on Home", was written by Lauper and Jan Pulsford, who would work with Lauper on much of her next album, Sisters of Avalon. The final new recording on the album was "I'm Gonna Be Strong", which Lauper had previously recorded with the band Blue Angel in 1984. Lauper said that the album included new songs because she believes that "music is a living thing", so she didn't want to make an album with only old songs, since a new audience was consuming her music at that moment.

"The Goonies 'R' Good Enough", from the soundtrack of The Goonies, was notably absent from the album despite having made the top 10 on the Billboard Hot 100. Lauper omitted the song due to the fights that had marked its production. Similarly, "Hole in My Heart (All the Way to China)", which appeared in the 1988 film Vibes, in which Lauper starred, was included only on the Japanese edition of the album.

The US and Canadian editions of the album omitted several tracks included elsewhere as Lauper was contractually prohibited from including more than 14 tracks on an album in the US, due to the division of songwriting royalties.

A video album was released on VHS, LaserDisc and later DVD. In addition to all of Lauper's music videos to date, it included interview footage shot in and around Coney Island. The video peaked at number 12 on Billboard Top Music Videos.

== Reception ==
Professional ratings
Review scores
Source	Rating
AllMusic	4/5 stars
Cash Box	(favorable)
Robert Christgau	C
Entertainment Weekly	B+
Music Week	3/5 stars

In his review of AllMusic, music critic Stephen Thomas Erlewine gave the album four out of five stars and said that although she returned to success with a collection of greatest hits, with the exception of the songs "True Colors" and "Change of Heart", the only songs by Lauper that have really been successful are on She's So Unusual, which he said was "a more consistent and fun album". Robert Christgau gave the album a "C" rating and, like Erlewine, felt that Lauper's subsequent material (after She's So Unusual) was inferior. The album sold 565,000 copies in the United States, according to Nielsen SoundScan. As of 1997, the album has sold over 4 million copies worldwide.

== Track listing ==
No.	Title	Writer(s)	Edition	Length
1.	"I'm Gonna Be Strong" (new recording)	Barry Mann, Cynthia Weil	All	3:52
2.	"Girls Just Want to Have Fun" (from She's So Unusual, 1983)	Robert Hazard	All	3:54
3.	"Money Changes Everything" (from She's So Unusual, 1983)	Tom Gray	All	5:04
4.	"Time After Time" (from She's So Unusual, 1983)	Cyndi Lauper, Rob Hyman	All	4:04
5.	"She Bop" (7" single remix; from She's So Unusual, 1983)	Cyndi Lauper, Gary Corbett, Rick Chertoff, Stephen Broughton Lunt	All	3:46
6.	"All Through the Night" (from She's So Unusual, 1983)	Jules Shear	All	4:29
7.	"Change of Heart" (from True Colors, 1986)	Cyndi Lauper, Essra Mohawk	All	4:25
8.	"True Colors" (from True Colors, 1986)	Billy Steinberg, Tom Kelly	All	3:47
9.	"What's Going On" (7" single remix; from True Colors, 1986)	Marvin Gaye, Al Cleveland, Renaldo Benson	All	3:54
10.	"I Drove All Night" (from A Night to Remember, 1989)	Billy Steinberg, Tom Kelly	All	4:12
11.	"The World Is Stone" (from Starmania/Tycoon (Soundtrack), 1992)	Luc Plamondon, Michel Berger, Tim Rice	International, Japan	4:25
12.	"Who Let in the Rain" (from Hat Full of Stars, 1993)	Cyndi Lauper, Allee Willis	International, Japan	4:37
13.	"That's What I Think" (single edit; from Hat Full of Stars, 1993)	Cyndi Lauper, Allee Willis, Eric Bazilian, Rob Hyman	All	4:23
14.	"Sally's Pigeons" (from Hat Full of Stars, 1993)	Cyndi Lauper, Mary Chapin Carpenter	All	3:46
15.	"Hey Now (Girls Just Want to Have Fun)" (new recording)	Lolly Vegas, Robert Hazard	All	3:54
16.	"Come on Home" (new recording; US version released in 1995 (instead of 1994 as the rest of the world) contains unique alternate mix)	Cyndi Lauper, Jan Pulsford	All	4:33
17.	"Hole in My Heart (All the Way to China)" (from Vibes (soundtrack), 1988)	Richard Orange	Japan	4:03

Bonus track (Japan, 2008 remastered edition)
No.	Title	Writer(s)	Length
18.	"Hole in My Heart (All the Way to China)" (Live at Summer Sonic 07)	Richard Orange

== Personnel ==
- Cyndi Lauper, Stacy Drummond – art direction
- Michelle Willems – design
- Kim Stringfellow – photography
- Marlow Palleja – cover lettering
- Laura Wills – styling
- Jody Morlock – makeup
- Helena Occhipinti – hair

== Charts ==
=== Weekly charts ===
Chart (1994–95)	Peak position
Australian Albums (ARIA)	25
Austrian Albums (Ö3 Austria)	18
Chilean Albums	4
Dutch Albums (Album Top 100)	38
European Albums (Top 100)	8
Finnish Albums (Suomen virallinen albumlista)	17
French Albums (SNEP)	6
German Albums (Offizielle Top 100)	18
Irish Albums (IRMA)	6
Italian Albums (Hit Parade Italia)	18
Japanese Albums (Oricon)	8
New Zealand Albums (RMNZ)	6
Scottish Albums (Official Charts)	7
South African Albums (RISA)	3
Spanish Albums (PROMUSICAE)	44
Swiss Albums (Schweizer Hitparade)	7
UK Albums (Official Charts)	2
US Billboard 200	81

=== Year-end charts ===
Chart (1994)	Position
UK Albums (OCC)	22

== Certifications and sales ==
Certifications for Twelve Deadly Cyns...and Then Some
Region	Certification	Certified units/sales
Australia (ARIA)	Gold	35,000^{^}
Brazil (Pro-Música Brasil) CD	Gold	100,000^{*}
Brazil (Pro-Música Brasil)	Gold	100,000^{‡}
France (SNEP)	2× Gold	200,000^{*}
Japan (RIAJ)	3× Platinum	800,000
New Zealand (RMNZ)	Gold	7,500^{^}
Switzerland (IFPI Switzerland)	Gold	25,000^{^}
United Kingdom (BPI)	2× Platinum	600,000^{^}
United States (RIAA)	Gold	565,000
Summaries
Worldwide	—	4,000,000
^{*} Sales figures based on certification alone.^{^} Shipments figures based on certification alone.^{‡} Sales+streaming figures based on certification alone.

=== Release history ===
Country/Region	Date	Label	Format	Cat. No.	Ref.
United Kingdom	August 22, 1994	Epic	CD; Cassette; Minidisc	477363 2; 477363 4; 477363 8	
