= Matisse (Greek band) =

- Origin: Athens, Greece
- Genres: Alternative rock, pop rock, indie rock, glam rock
- Years active: 1999–present
- Label: Sony Music Greece
- Members: Giannis Massouras; Grigoris Kollias; Aris Siafas; Vasilis Zervos; Nikos Manousopoulos
- Past members: Andreas Ioannou, Alex Kavvadias, Petros Tsolis, Thodoris Sourvinos, Kostas Synodinos
- Website: www.Birthmark.com

Matisse is an English language-singing alternative rock band from Athens, Greece formed in 1999. They took their name from the famous French painter Henri Matisse.

== Biography ==
=== Early history (1999–2002) ===
Matisse was originally formed in 1999 by Aris Siafas, John Massouras, Andreas Ioannou and Petros Tsolis without making any significant actions as a band. The band became active, when they started performing and writing songs for the first time in January 1999. In the beginning of their career the band was making live performances, mostly in small venues in Athens. Still though, they didn't have enough money for recordings. Matisse have also supported many acts including Reamonn, Puressence, Shed Seven, The Frank and Walters, Drugstore. While recruiting keyboardist Kostas Synodinos they continued with the occasional live show and demo, until they signed a contract with Sony Greece in 2002. By winter of 2002, they began recording their EP 4 (Four), which was released in the summer of 2003. Days before the release, Ioannou left the band and was replaced by Grigoris Kollias (Greggy K).

=== Breakthrough success (2005–2006) ===
Two years after the release of their EP 4 (Four), in June 2005 Matisse released their debut album Cheap As Art which hit the #3 spot on Pop & Rock Magazine's "Best of the Year List". The lead single of the album She Smiles, became a radio classic. Enthusiastically received by the critics Cheap As Art set off the band to a great start.

A few days after the release of their debut, Matisse opened the first day of the Rockwave Festival as supporting act for Garbage and Marilyn Manson. Their performance was welcomed by journalists and public alike. In the beginning of 2006, the band started writing material for their second album, with few changes in their line-up; Kostas Synodinos departed from the group and Petros Tsolis was replaced by Nikos Manosopulos. In December of the same year they also supported Kaiser Chiefs in their live performance in Greece. In May 2007 their second album Toys Up was released.

In 2007, Aris Siafas left the band for personal reasons. He was replaced by Alex Kavadias, a Greek-Australian singer. The band re-released Toys Up, in deluxe edition, with videos, remixes, as well as a new mix from their cover on Cyndi Lauper's song "She Bop" performed by their new singer Alex.

=== Rock 'N Roll Mafia (2009) ===
In 2009 the band released their third album, Rock 'N Roll Mafia, the lead single being the album's namesake, Rock 'N Roll Mafia. This is also the only album of the band with Alex on the vocals, who left two years later to pursue a solo career.

In 2011 Aris Siafas returned to the band to release digital single Sunny Mae. Matisse open for Suede in September 2011 and a few months later (May 2012), released their 4th album "Paperdoor".

== Members ==
=== Current lineup ===
- Aris Siafas - vocals, he returned to the band in the summer of 2011
- Grigoris Kollias - Lead Guitar, backing vocals
- Vasilis Zervos - Rhythm Guitar
- Giannis Massouras - backing vocals, Bass
- Nikos Manousopoulos - drums

=== Former members ===
- Alex Kavadias - vocals
- Petros Tsolis - drums
- Kostas Synodinos - keyboards, Piano

== Discography ==
=== Albums ===
- 2005: Cheap As Art
- 2007: Toys Up
- 2009: Rock 'N Roll Mafia
- 2012: Paper Door

==== EPs ====
- 2003: 4
