= 4 (Matisse EP) =

EP by Matisse
- Released: June 2003
- Recorded: 2002
- Genres: Alternative rock Indie rock
- Label: Sony BMG/Columbia

Matisse chronology
| 4 (2003) | Cheap As Art (2005) |

Professional ratings
Review scores
| Source | Rating |
|---|---|
| Pop & Rock magazine | 7/10 stars |

4 (Four) is the first release by the Greek alternative rock band Matisse. The EP was released in the summer of 2003 and it includes the song "The Great Sleep", which is considered a fan favorite in their live shows.

== Track listening ==
| No. | Title | Length |
|---|---|---|
| 1. | "The Great Sleep" | 4:33 |
| 2. | "A Season In Reason (Who)" | 3:11 |
| 3. | "My Only Friend" | 4:07 |
| 4. | "This Town" | 3:52 |
