= Cheap As Art =

Studio album by Matisse
- Released: 21 June 2005
- Recorded: June 2005
- Genre: Alternative rock Indie rock Pop rock
- Label: Sony BMG Greece/Columbia
- Producer: Aris Christou Last album = 4 (2003)

Matisse chronology
Cheap As Art (2005)	Toys Up (2007)

Professional ratings
Review scores
Source	Rating
Pop & Rock Magazine	3.5/5 stars

Cheap As Art is the debut album by the Greek alternative rock band Matisse. They depict their debut as "an invocation to lunacy, as art always bowed down to madness".

== Track listing ==
1. "Let Me Go Home"
2. "Rock N' Roll For Boys"
3. "The Gospel"
4. "She Smiles"
5. "Fragments Of Life"
6. "The Only One I Love Is My Hate"
7. "Cosmic Dancer" (T.Rex Cover)
8. "Bedroom Eyes"
9. "Jealous"
10. "Innocent Lie"
11. "Song About A Song"
12. "Cheap As Art"
13. "She Smiles (Cyanna Remix)"
14. "Let Me Go Home (Marsheaux Remix)"
15. "Pluto"
