= Alison Ellwood =

Australian filmmaker (born 1961)

- Born: 1961 (age 64–65); Australia
- Education: New York University
- Occupations: Documentary filmmaker, director, producer, editor
- Years active: 1983–present
- Awards: Critics Choice Award for Best Music Documentary (2020)

Alison Ellwood is an Australian documentary filmmaker known for such films as Enron: The Smartest Guys in the Room, Laurel Canyon, and How to Change Your Mind.

== Biography ==
Ellwood was born in Australia in 1961. She wanted to be a photojournalist as a kid and attended film school at New York University. After graduating in 1983, she began editing films in New York City. She transitioned into producing in the 1990s, starting with the 1996 film Brett Killed Mom: A Sister's Diary.

In 2020, she released a documentary film about The Go-Go's. It premiered at the Sundance Film Festival where it won a Critics Choice Award for Best Music Documentary.

== Filmography ==
- 1996: Brett Killed Mom: A Sister's Diary, Producer
- 2005: Enron: The Smartest Guys in the Room, Co-producer, editor
- 2010: Casino Jack and the United States of Money, Editor
- 2011: Magic Trip
- 2013: History of the Eagles
- 2017: American Jihad
- 2020: Laurel Canyon
- 2020: The Go-Go's
- 2020: Women of Troy, Director
- 2022: How to Change Your Mind
- 2023: Let the Canary Sing
- 2025: Boy George & Culture Club
