= Rock 'N Roll Mafia =

Studio album by Matisse
- Released: 9 June 2009
- Genre: Alternative rock Pop rock
- Label: Sony Music, Columbia
- Producer: Aris Christou

Singles from Rock 'N Roll Mafia
- 1. "Rock 'N Roll Mafia" Released: 1 June 2009

Rock 'N Roll Mafia is the third studio album from the Greek band Matisse, released in Greece on 9 June 2009.

== Track listing ==
1. "Rock 'N Roll Mafia"
2. "Today" ft. Johnette Napolitano
3. "I Like"
4. "Not Alone"
5. "Sunday Morning" ft. Lenka
6. "Last Dance"
7. "Party Tonight
8. "The Fear"
9. "Hell is Livin' With You"
10. "Rebels"
11. "Murder Me"
12. "Mary"
