= Hard to Be Me =

Television pilot

- Created by: Edward Robert Bach
- Starring: Edward Robert Bach; Kendra North; Katie E. Jones; Michael Garvey; Ali Walton; Doug Henderson; Megan Hurst; Kelli Biggs; Estenia Goodridge; Carleen Troy; Brandon Rice
- Opening theme: "It's Hard to Be Me" by Cyndi Lauper (August 2010-2019); "Ready or Not" by Long Since Forgotten (Prior to August 2010, 2020)
- Country of origin: United States
- Original language: English
- No. of episodes: 1

Production
- Executive producers: Edward Robert Bach; Robert P. Bach; Virginia Ryker
- Producers: Lauren Gildner; Aditi V. Desai; Edward Robert Bach; Virginia Ryker
- Running time: 45 minutes

Hard to Be Me is a comedy-drama television pilot created by and starring Edward Robert Bach. The show follows Kevin Hamilton, a second-year art student played by Bach, who documents his weekly experiences through a vlog and art.

This innovative framing device led critics to label it "the first web web 2.0 television show". Director Erik Cieslewicz cited this aspect as a key reason for his involvement in the project. The pilot's creators described the show as a blend of Gilmore Girls a little Everybody Hates Chris", with this mix of styles being a major component of the series.

Hard to Be Me won a "slew of awards at film festivals" and was also pitched to several networks, ultimately landing on Amazon Prime.

== Synopsis ==
Using the framing device of Kevin's video blog, the pilot follows Kevin receiving the weekly assignment of creating the blog from his demanding Communications 101 professor Dr. Candice Wilkes (Biggs). His first blog, introducing his family and friends, introduces the audience to the universe of the show as well. The show also follows a group of characters, who—like the audience—are watching Kevin's blog as part of the narrative of the show.

== Cast ==
- Edward Robert Bach as Kevin Hamilton
- Kendra North as Patricia Hamilton
- Katie E. Jones as Shannon Hamilton
- Michael Garvey as Patrick Hamilton
- Ali Walton as Olivia Willis-Henshall
- Doug Henderson as Daniel Corrigan
- Megan Hurst as Juliet Crawford
- Kelli Biggs as Dr. Candice Wilkes
- Estenia Goodridge as Melody
- Carleen Troy as Shareece
- Brandon Rice as Malcolm

== Production ==
Bach stated that "There is definitely some of me in the plot and character developed around Kevin" and that he hoped "Viewers will see themselves in all the characters" as well. It took approximately a year from start to finish to produce the pilot episode. Bach stated numerous times that he would like the characters in the show to be relatable and empathetic while the plots to be universal and family friendly. Additionally, the reason to set the show in Washington, D.C. was to show "the softer, non-political side of DC and the people who live here."

According to Cieslewicz, "the goal from the beginning was to create a broadcast-ready pilot", and that the production considered "hundreds" of actors from the Washington, D.C. area when casting. Kevin's favorite artist in the show is also one of Bach's as well: Drew Struzan. According to Bach, Struzan "liked the idea of the Pilot" and his self-portrait appears in the pilot.

In August 2010, the show reached an agreement with Cyndi Lauper to provide her track "It's Hard to Be Me" as the theme song of the show. Before that date, and beginning again in 2020, the theme song for the show is " Ready or Not " by Long Since Forgotten.

== Release ==
As of June 29, 2020, the Pilot episode of "Hard to Be Me" is available to stream on Amazon Prime.

== Reception ==
In addition to calling the pilot "the first web 2.0 TV show", The Wausau City Pages also described it as "giving a truly unique perspective on youth, life and social media technology." Blogger William Powell declared in his review that the show was "directed with crisp professionalism by Erik Cieslewicz" and that "Hard To Be Me is a pilot that will probably wind up on the small screen on a major network soon. Mark my words."

=== Awards ===
| Year | Category | Institution or publication | Result | Notes | Ref. |
|---|---|---|---|---|---|
| 2011 | Best Dramedy | New York International Independent Film and Video Festival | Won | Short Category | |
| 2011 | Silver Award | California Film Awards | Won | TV Pilot Category | |
| 2010 | Best TV Pilot | New York International Independent Film and Video Festival | Won | | |
| 2010 | Leading Actor; Leading Actress; TV Pilot | Accolade Competition | Won | Edward Robert Bach; Kendra North; Award of Excellence | |
