= American Jihad (film) =

American documentary film

- Directed by: Alison Ellwood
- Narrated by: Liev Schreiber

Production
- Producers: Alex Gibney; Sarah Dowland; Stacey Offman; Jeff Fager; Michael Radutzky; Matt Goldberg; Brandon Carroll; John Logan Pierson; Richard Perello

Original release
- Network: Showtime
- Release: March 11, 2017

American Jihad is a 2017 documentary film directed by Alison Ellwood.

== Premise ==
American Jihad is a documentary about domestic terrorism in the United States. Inspired by the 2016 film Patriots Day, it explores how young men in the United States are radicalized and prevention against such radicalization. It also discusses the image of Anwar al-Awlaki and his influence on American to join the Jihadist cause.

== Production and release ==
American Jihad is directed by Alison Ellwood with executive producer Alex Gibney. It was released on Showtime on March 11, 2017.

== Reception ==
The Los Angeles Times wrote that American Jihad, "finds two main commonalities among the young men it follows: the need for stability and the misguided belief they'd found it in the teachings of dangerous propagandists such as Al Qaeda's Anwar Awlaki." The New York Times wrote, "the film would be better if it teased out its ideas about personal interventions and how mainstream Muslims might be brought into such an approach, but it's still full of food for thought served at just the right moment." Rolling Stone wrote that it was "essential viewing in Trump era."
