= Toys Up =

Toys up

Studio album by Matisse
- Released: 14 May 2007
- Recorded: 2006–2007 Athens SCA studios
- Genre: Alternative rock Pop rock
- Label: Sony BMG Greece/Columbia
- Producer: Aris Christou

Singles from Toys up
- 1. "Call Me Call Me" Released: 15 May 2007; 2. "Judgment Day" Released: 20 September 2007; 3. "5 Seconds of Love"

Toys Up is the third studio album by the Greek music band Matisse released in Greece in 2007.

== Overview ==
=== Music style ===
Compared to the band's earlier albums, the style of Toys Up is unexpected. Not following the feeling and pop rock sound of their debut Cheap As Art, Toys Up introduces another side of the band. More solid, determined and conclusively whole, darker and more rough around the edges, this visceral new attitude has infiltrated the seemingly bright songs of the album and has inevitably embraced the deep, intensely clouded lyrics, a change that is obviously portrayed through the songs in Toys Up.

=== Album artwork ===
The original album collage was done by Emanuale Balzani, who said that he took the inspiration from the paper collages that Henri Matisse made when he was infected by cancer in the period before his death. It is in essence an ode to the great painter for his work.

== Track listing ==
1. "Call Me Call Me" - 3:41
2. "Judgment Day" - 3:53
3. "Killer Kids" - 3:20
4. "Mind the gap" - 2:59
5. "Gas" (feat. Dimitra Galani) - 2:00
6. "5 Seconds of Love" - 3:39
7. "Snowhite"- 3:00
8. "She Bop" (Cyndi Lauper cover) - 3:25
9. "Toys Up" - 2:36
10. "Hit and Miss" - 2:05
11. "Tel Aviv" (Hill of Spring) - 1:00
12. "Call Me Call Me" (GK Full Moon Mix) - 1:22
