= Goon Squad (band) =

Goon Squad was a dance music group assembled by producer Arthur Baker. Their song "Eight Arms to Hold You" went to number one on the Billboard Hot Dance Club Play chart in 1985. The song was used for the movie The Goonies; although the main scene it was used in was deleted (it is still played, although barely audible, during the scene when Chunk first enters the Walshes' residence), it was nevertheless included on the soundtrack. The scene involved the Goonies being attacked by a giant octopus as they waded through tunnels. They defeat the octopus by throwing a Walkman playing the song into its mouth, which causes it to start dancing. The scene was cut for being too cartoony. The group featured vocals from Will Downing, Craig Derry, Bobby Coleman, Tina B., and Cindy Mizell.

A follow-up single, "Powerdrill", peaked at number thirty-one.

== See also ==
- List of Billboard number-one dance club songs
- List of artists who reached number one on the U.S. Dance Club Songs chart
