= Eight Arms to Hold You (song) =

Single by Goon Squad

from the album The Goonies: Original Motion Picture Soundtrack
- Released: 1985
- Genre: Electro; freestyle
- Label: Atlantic
- Songwriters: Arthur Baker; Jimmy Bralower; Robbie Kilgore
- Producer: Arthur Baker

"Eight Arms to Hold You" was a song recorded for the soundtrack to the film The Goonies. The title is borrowed from the working title of the Beatles' second film, Help!. The song was recorded by a studio group called Goon Squad that was put together by producer Arthur Baker. It was utilized in a scene in the film where the character Data puts a loud tape recorder (blaring the song) into the mouth of an octopus to fend it off. The scene was deleted from the film and the song only minimally appeared in the theatrical release of the film (though barely audible) during the scene when Chunk first enters the Walsh residence. A single was released on both 12" and 7" vinyl. It reached number one on the Billboard Hot Dance Club Play chart and peaked at number eighty on the Hot R&B Singles chart.

The "octopus scene" was replaced for broadcast on the Disney Channel, in order to make up for time removed due to objectionable content. It was also included in a deleted scenes featurette in the 2001 DVD release.

== Track listings ==
=== 12" single ===
1. Vocal
2. Bonus Beat
3. Dub

=== 7" single ===
1. Edit
2. Dub
