= Shine (Cyndi Lauper album) =

2004 studio album by Cyndi Lauper

Studio album / Extended play by Cyndi Lauper
- Released: July 2002 (EP); May 3, 2004 (LP in Japan)
- Recorded: 1999/2000
- Genres: Pop rock; dance-pop
- Length: 54:47
- Labels: Epic; Oglio
- Producers: Cyndi Lauper; William Wittman

Cyndi Lauper chronology
Merry Christmas ... Have a Nice Life (1998)	Shine (2002)	The Essential Cyndi Lauper (2003)

Singles from Shine
- 1. "Shine" Released: 2002

Shine is the eighth studio album by American singer Cyndi Lauper, released exclusively in Japan in 2004. The album was ready for release in 2001 but Edel Records, the label it was recorded with, folded. Two EPs were released instead: One was also called "Shine" (2002) and the other was called "Shine Remixes" (2003). The "Shine EP" has sold 41,000 copies in the United States, according to Nielsen SoundScan.

The album expands on the sound Lauper developed with her 1997 album Sisters of Avalon. Mostly pop songs, it flirts with electronica and new wave while incorporating traditional instruments like sitars and fiddles. The songs are not lyrically linked, and explore themes ranging from the Madonna–Whore Complex to celebrity life.

The track "It's Hard to be Me" was penned about Anna Nicole Smith; Smith attempted to buy it as the theme song to her reality show but Lauper declined. In 2010, Lauper did allow the independently produced television pilot Hard to Be Me to use the track for its theme song. She then subsequently used it as the theme song to her own reality show Cyndi Lauper: Still So Unusual.

== Background ==
Lauper originally envisioned Shine as a "dance record", but as she continued to work on the songs, she realized they were "too complicated for dance". She opted for a broader and less restrictive range of genres to record an album of "pop, rock, dance and R&B". The album was originally due to have been released by Edel Records in July 2001, then the date was pushed back to September 11, 2001. A few weeks before the scheduled release date, Edel folded and Lauper successfully got the rights back to the album. She passed on the opportunity of releasing it on a small independent label and began searching for a new deal with a major label. She told the Florence Morning News in 2001, "I'm very excited about the new record, and I'm talking to a few places. I just want to be at the right place with people who all want to be on the same page."

While searching for a new label, Lauper began reworking some of the recordings, including redoing some of the drum tracks and adding or removing various aspects of the tracks. She also continued writing new material with the possibility of recording them for a revised Shine. She told The Bulletin in 2002, "After 9/11 I felt I needed to change [the album], because it wasn't going to be the same record. I took some stuff off and put some stuff on. It would be different because I felt different."

Lauper hoped to see Shine released in the early summer of 2002, but the meetings with numerous labels only resulted in what she later described as "disheartening feedback". Some of the songs on Shine also ended up being leaked on the internet in their demo form from demonstration cassettes that were in circulation. Ultimately, Lauper decided to independently release a five-track EP with four songs from Shine, plus a remix of the title track, on July 16, 2002.

When selecting the songs for the Shine EP, Lauper favored those that audiences were singing along with at her concerts. She revealed to Newsday in 2002, "When I got to Dallas and 20,000 people were singing back to what [ended up] on Shine, it kind of made me step back and reevaluate my belief system. To have them sing back to me on that level meant, 'Hey, not only did they want to hear that stuff, but they found any way they could to hear it.' So I decided to put out this CD with the songs they're singing." Lauper still intended to find a label to release Shine in its entirety, but this did not come to fruition except in Japan, where it was released by Epic Records in 2004.

== Track listing ==
Demonstration Cassette (2001) (Contains Demo Versions)

1. "Higher Plane"
2. "Water's Edge"
3. "Rather Be with You"
4. "Wide Open"
5. "Comfort You"
6. "This Kind of Love"
7. "Higher Plane" (Eddie X Mix)

EP version (2002)

1. "Shine" (Edit) - 3:44
2. "It's Hard to Be Me" - 3:52
3. "Madonna Whore" - 3:38
4. "Water's Edge" - 5:22
5. "Shine" (Illicit Mix) - 4:33

Shine – 2004 LP version
No.	Title	Writer(s)	Length
1.	"Shine"	Cyndi Lauper; William Wittman	4:33
2.	"It's Hard to Be Me"	Lauper; Rob Hyman; Wittman	3:52
3.	"Madonna Whore"	Lauper; Wittman	3:38
4.	"Wide Open"	Lauper; Jan Pulsford	3:48
5.	"Rather Be with You"	Lauper; Doc Fleming; Marcello Nines	3:24
6.	"Who Let in the Rain"	Lauper; Alley Willis	4:32
7.	"Comfort You"	Lauper; Pulsford	4:11
8.	"Eventually"	Lauper; Ryuichi Sakamoto	5:28
9.	"Valentino"	Lauper, Pulsford	5:10
10.	"This Kind of Love"	Lauper; Nines	3:53
11.	"Higher Plane"	Lauper; Pulsford	4:13
12.	"Water's Edge"	Lauper; Hyman	5:22
13.	"I Miss My Baby"	Lauper; Pulsford	3:22
Total length:			55:36

- On the CD edition, "Higher Plane" ia misspelled as "Higher Place".

== Charts ==
Chart (2004)	Peak position
Japanese Albums	120
US Top Independent Albums (Billboard)	42

== Release history ==
Country	Date	Format	Label	Catalog
United States	16 July 2002	CD (EP Version)	Oglio Records	OGL 82015-2
Japan	21 April 2004	CD (Album Version)	Epic	EICP 358
