= Let the Canary Sing =

2023 documentary film about Cindy Lauper

- Film poster
- Directed by: Alison Ellwood
- Produced by: Trevor Birney; Alison Ellwood; Ehmear O'Neill; Andrew Tully
- Starring: Cyndi Lauper
- Cinematography: Michelle McCabe
- Edited by: Juli Vizza
- Music by: Wendy Blackstone
- Production companies: MTV Entertainment Studios; Sony Music Entertainment; Concord Originals; Fine Point Films
- Distributed by: Paramount+
- Release date: June 14, 2023 (Tribeca Festival)
- Running time: 98 minutes
- Country: United States
- Language: English

Let the Canary Sing is a 2023 American documentary film about the life of Cyndi Lauper. It is produced and directed by Alison Ellwood. It was released in June 2024 on Paramount+.

== Release ==
The film premiered at the Tribeca Festival in June 2023. It was released on Paramount+ on June 4, 2024. One day before the release, Lauper announced that she would be holding one last series of concerts known as the Girls Just Wanna Have Fun Farewell Tour prior to retiring from touring altogether.

== Reception ==
On the review aggregator website Rotten Tomatoes, 83% of 12 critics' reviews are positive, with an average rating of 7/10. Metacritic, which uses a weighted average, assigned the film a score of 68 out of 100, based on four critics, indicating "generally favorable" reviews.

John Paul King of the Washington Blade stated the film "has the power to make viewers into true believers not only in her talent, but in her message of acceptance, inclusion, and unconditional love." Owen Gleiberman of Variety stated the film "does an excellent job of tracing how Cyndi Lauper came to be...Cyndi Lauper," while also stating "yet it's sort of an idiosyncratic movie, because that's all it does."

== Soundtrack ==
The soundtrack for the documentary was released on May 31, 2024.
