= Hat Full of Stars =

Studio album by Cyndi Lauper
- Released: June 30, 1993
- Recorded: August 1, 1992–February 28, 1993
- Studios: The Hit Factory; Sigma Sound Studios; Messina Sound; Right Track Recording; The Enchanted Cottage; The Ranch; World Famous Orbit Sound
- Genres: Pop; R&B; soul
- Length: 52:50
- Label: Epic
- Producers: Cyndi Lauper; Junior Vasquez; William Wittman

Cyndi Lauper chronology
A Night to Remember (1989)	Hat Full of Stars (1993)	Twelve Deadly Cyns...and Then Some (1994)

Singles from Hat Full of Stars
- 1. "Who Let In the Rain" Released: June 22, 1993; 2. "Sally's Pigeons" Released: September 1993 (EU); 3. "That's What I Think" Released: November 1, 1993; 4. "Hat Full of Stars" Released: December 2, 1993 (Japan)

Hat Full of Stars is the fourth studio album by American singer-songwriter Cyndi Lauper, released in 1993. The album was released 4 years after the singer's third studio album, A Night to Remember, which received unfavorable reviews and had low sales compared to the singer's previous releases. Hat Full of Stars received favorable reviews but was poorly received by the public, receiving gold certifications in Japan and France only.

== Production and composition ==
Hat Full of Stars deviated from Lauper's pop-rock sound of previous projects and delved heavily into alternative music. It also furthered her growing penchant for writing topical songs about social issues. The album was recorded at the Hit Factory, Sigma Sound, Messina Sound, Right Track, The Enchanted Cottage, The Ranch, and World Famous Orbit Sound. It was co-produced by dance-music artist Junior Vasquez and is highly typical of his work of the time; as such, many of the songs are held together by synthetic loops and percussion. Lyrics address issues like abortion ("Sally's Pigeons"), racism ("A Part Hate"), spousal abuse ("Product of Misery" and "Broken Glass") and incest ("Lies").

The track "Product of Misery" was inspired by a teacher of Lauper's, Bob Barrell, who described the masses of struggling people as a 'product of misery' and that misery begets misery unless the chain is broken.

The song "A Part Hate" was conceived as an anti-apartheid song and was originally written for Lauper's second album True Colors but was not included because her label felt it would make the album too political; it already had a cover of Marvin Gaye's "What's Going On" and the title track included.

Lauper has commented that she wishes that her vocals on the project had been sharper. She worked with a vocal coach to sharpen her vocals for her next studio album Sisters of Avalon, and mentions this in the liner notes. The album cover was inspired by a photograph of the actress Mary Pickford, taken by photographer Nelson Evans.

== Critical reception ==
Professional ratings
Review scores
Source	Rating
AllMusic	1.5/5 stars
Calgary Herald	B
Billboard	(favourable)
Entertainment Weekly	B
Los Angeles Times	3/4 stars
People	(favourable)
Rolling Stone	4/5 stars

The album received mostly favorable reviews from music critics. Holly George-Warren from Rolling Stone gave the album four out of five stars and wrote that the album is Lauper's "most ambitious". She praised Lauper's vocals ("her multioctave voice has never sounded better, hitting highs, lows and everything in between") and the musical arrangement for its "imaginative" combination of rootsy instrumentation and R&B staples, underpinned by dance-music mainstays.

People magazine gave the album a favorable review in which it was said that the real strength of the album "is the way Lauper lets her feelings and opinions, dark as some of them are, emerge naturally" the review ended claiming that the "wacky energy that made Lauper perfect for the go-go '80s is pretty much gone-gone, but Hat's clear-eyed pop rock provides '90s nourishment for body and soul."

Tom Sinclair from Entertainment Weekly gave the album a B and wrote that it brings a diversity of rhythms and vocals to reach varied tastes he conclude that old fans of Lauper "probably won't be disappointed by Hat Full of Stars" but he was skeptical about the record being able to garner a new audience for the singer.

Pan-European magazine Music & Media praised the album for delivering "mature music, nurturing the child within". The magazine felt that Cyndi had steered away from the "more stark and synth-dominated efforts" of her recent work and instead re-instated some of "the almost child-like musical Americana we fell in love with on her debut She's So Unusual".

Billboard magazine gave the album a positive review, stating that it marked a "metamorphosis" for Lauper from "fun-loving, she-bopping squealer" to a "mature artiste with admirable depth". The review highlighted the song "Who Let in the Rain" as reminiscent of Lauper's 1984 hit "Time After Time". Other tracks noted as highlights were "A Part Hate", "Lies", which recalled "early Siouxsie & the Banshees", "Feels Like Christmas" and "Like I Used To", described as a "hybrid of Madonna-style pop and vintage Motown".

Cashbox praised the album as "wonderful" commenting that "few things in contemporary music are as compelling as watching an artist mature and develop...as time passes, Miss Lauper’s art improves by leaps and bounds. This set is an affecting and moving testimonial to her convictions and character."

In negative reviews, Mike DeGaggne from AllMusic wrote that the singer "sounds much more appealing and enjoyable as an effervescent pop singer wading through simplistic and feel-good material rather than trying to befriend mildly opinionated pieces, which is what happens throughout most of Hat Full of Stars." Robert Christgau rated the album as a record that "may impress once or twice with consistent craft or an arresting track or two. Then it won't."

== Commercial performance ==
The album was a commercial disappointment in the United States and despite some positive critical reviews it stalled at No. 112 on the Billboard 200 albums chart. As of 2003 the album has sold 119,000 copies in the United States, according to Nielsen SoundScan.

The album fared better overseas, becoming most successful in Japan and France, achieving a Gold certification in both countries. In Japan, the album spent a total of 7 weeks on the albums chart, peaking at 15. In France the album debuted at 10 before reaching its peak of 9 the following week. This was both her highest debut and peak for a studio album in France and it stayed in the Top 40 for 7 weeks.

The album achieved lower chart positions in the rest of Europe. In Germany, Hat Full of Stars entered the chart at 84 and re-entered at its peak of 52 two weeks later, spending a total of 9 weeks in the Top 100. The album spent four weeks on the Swiss albums chart, entering at 34 and climbing two positions higher to its peak in its second week. The album was released in the UK in November, entering the albums chart at 56 before dropping off the following week.

=== Singles ===
- "Who Let in the Rain" was the album's lead single in most territories, though was the second single in the United Kingdom. It reached the top 20 of the singles chart in New Zealand and the top 40 in the United Kingdom.
- "That's What I Think" was the second single in the United States and the lead single in the United Kingdom, reaching number 31 on the singles chart in the latter country.
- "Sally's Pigeons" was released in certain European countries as the album's second single and was re-released in 1994 to promote Twelve Deadly Cyns...and Then Some and was re-recorded by Cyndi in 2022.
- "Hat Full of Stars" was released as the second single in Japan.

Despite not being a single, the album track "Someone Like Me" received radio adds in Switzerland in June 1993 and in France in July 1993. The album track "Broken Glass" received adds in Holland in June 1993. Additionally, "Feels Like Christmas" entered the UK airplay chart in December 1994, peaking at number 89.

== Track listing ==
No.	Title	Writer(s)	Length
1.	"That's What I Think"	Cyndi Lauper; Eric Bazilian; Rob Hyman; Allee Willis	4:39
2.	"Product of Misery"	Lauper; Bazilian; Hyman	4:11
3.	"Who Let In the Rain"	Lauper; Willis	4:37
4.	"Lies"	Lauper; Willis	3:40
5.	"Broken Glass"	Lauper; Marv DePeyer; Junior Vasquez	5:34
6.	"Sally's Pigeons"	Lauper; Mary Chapin Carpenter	3:48
7.	"Feels Like Christmas"	Lauper; Bazilian; Hyman	4:35
8.	"Dear John"	Lauper; Bazilian; Hyman	3:40
9.	"Like I Used To"	Lauper; Willis	4:28
10.	"Someone Like Me"	Lauper; Bazilian; Hyman; Willis	4:07
11.	"A Part Hate"	Lauper; Tom Gray; David Thornton	4:56
12.	"Hat Full of Stars"	Lauper; Nicky Holland	4:28
Total length:			52:50

Note

- A track, "Cold", was recorded for the album but was omitted from the final track listing. It was released as the B-side to "Who Let In the Rain" and "Sally's Pigeons".

== Personnel ==
- Cyndi Lauper – lead vocals, backing vocals
- Jeff Bova – keyboards
- Nicky Holland – keyboards, acoustic piano, backing vocals
- Rob Hyman – keyboards, Casio synthesizer, organ, accordion, melodica, backing vocals
- Merv De Peyer – additional keyboards
- Christopher Garcia – additional programming
- Fred McFarlane – keyboards
- Joey Moskowitz – keyboards, bass, drum programming
- Allee Willis – keyboards, Casio synthesizer, additional programming, bass, backing vocals
- Peter Wood – keyboards, guitar, bass, drum programming, additional arrangements
- Eric Bazilian – acoustic piano, guitar, mandolin, dulcimer, bass, drum programming, saxophone, backing vocals
- Carlos Alomar – guitar
- Rick DiFonzo – guitar
- Nile Rodgers – guitar
- Larry Treadwell – guitar
- Kevin Jenkins – bass
- Bakithi Kumalo – bass
- Danny Sembello – bass
- Anton Fig – live drums
- David Uosikkinen – live drums
- Jimmy Bralower – drum programming
- Bashiri Johnson – congas
- Rob Paparozzi – harmonica
- Hugh Masekela – flugelhorn, backing vocals, vocal chant
- Deborah Fraser – backing vocals
- Georgia Jones – backing vocals
- Faith Kekana – backing vocals
- Lawrence Matshiza – backing vocals
- Junior Vasquez – backing vocals, additional arrangements
- William Wittman – backing vocals
- Stella Zulu – backing vocals
- David Thornton - backing vocals (track 11)

=== Production ===
- Cyndi Lauper – producer, recording, art direction, design
- Junior Vasquez – co-producer (1, 3–7, 8, 9, 10)
- William Wittman – additional production, recording (1–11), mixing (1, 5–8, 10, 11)
- Frank Filipetti – recording (1, 2, 3), mixing (2, 9)
- Dennis Mitchell – recording (1–11), mixing (4)
- Eric Bazilian – recording (2, 7, 8)
- Peter Wood – recording (3)
- Curt Frasca – recording (4, 9, 12)
- Christopher Garcia – recording (4, 9)
- Rob Paustian – recording (5, 12)
- Robin Irvine – recording (8)
- Alan Gregorie – recording (12)
- Goh Hotoda – mixing (3, 12), recording (12)
- Carl Glanville – assistant engineer
- Gary Tole – assistant engineer
- Ted Truwhella – assistant engineer
- Brian Wittmer – assistant engineer
- Jennifer Monnar – assistant engineer
- Stacy Drummond – art direction, design
- Dana Shimizu – design assistant
- Robert Lewis – photography
- David Thornton – drawings
- Laura Wills – styling
- Jody Morlock – makeup
- Danilo for Pierre Michel, NYC – hair

== Charts ==
=== Weekly charts ===
Chart (1993)	Peak position
Australian Albums (ARIA)	102
Canadian Albums (The Record)	68
European Albums (Top 100)	38
French Albums (SNEP)	9
German Albums (Offizielle Top 100)	52
Italian Albums (Hit Parade Italia)	35
Japanese Albums (Oricon)	15
South African Albums (RISA)	67
Swiss Albums (Schweizer Hitparade)	32
UK Albums (Official Charts)	56
US Billboard 200	112
Zimbabwean Albums (ZIMA)	7

=== Year-end charts ===
Chart (1993)	Position
French Albums (SNEP)	94

== Certifications ==
Region	Certification	Certified units/sales
France (SNEP)	Gold	100,000^{*}
Japan (RIAJ)	Gold	100,000^{^}
United States	—	119,000
^{*} Sales figures based on certification alone.^{^} Shipments figures based on certification alone.

== Release history ==
Country/Region	Date	Label	Format	Cat. No.	Ref.
Japan	21 May 1993	Epic	CD	ESCA 5742	
Japan	21 June 1993	Epic	Minidisc	ESYA 1020	
Europe	24 May 1993	Epic	LP; Cassette; CD	473054 1; 473054 4; 473054 2	
United States	June 1993	Epic	Cassette; CD	ET 52878; EK 52878	
United Kingdom	November 15, 1993	Epic	LP; Cassette; CD	473054 1; 473054 4; 47305 2	
United Kingdom	September 1996	Sony Music	CD	473054 2	
Japan	3 September 2008	Sony Music	CD	EICP-1042	
