= That's What I Think =

1993 single by Cyndi Lauper

Single by Cyndi Lauper

from the album Hat Full of Stars
- B-side: "That's What I Think" (Live Version)
- Released: November 1, 1993
- Studio: Messina Sound (New York, NY)
- Genre: Pop
- Length: 4:39
- Label: Epic
- Songwriters: Cyndi Lauper; Rob Hyman; Allee Willis; Eric Bazilian
- Producers: Cyndi Lauper; Junior Vasquez

Cyndi Lauper singles chronology
"Who Let In the Rain" (1993)	"That's What I Think" (1993)	"Sally's Pigeons" (1993)

Music video
- "That's What I Think" on YouTube

"That's What I Think" is a song by American singer and songwriter Cyndi Lauper, released in November 1993 by Epic Records as the second single from her fourth album, Hat Full of Stars (1993). Written by Lauper with Rob Hyman, Allee Willis and Eric Bazilian, the song was also produced by her with Junior Vasquez. It peaked in the top 40 in a couple of countries and was a dance hit in the United States. Its popular remixes caused the track to climb on the dance charts. It appeared on the album Twelve Deadly Cyns...and Then Some in its album edit format. The accompanying music video was directed by Lauper, featuring different fans explaining what music meant to them. Upon the release, Lauper performed the song at the American Music Awards, The Late Show with David Letterman, The Arsenio Hall Show, and The Tonight Show.

Tommy Page covered the song on his 1996 album Loving You.

== Critical reception ==
Mike DeGagne from AllMusic felt that songs like "That's What I Think" "make for the most promising" of the 11 cuts on the Hat Full of Stars album. Larry Flick from Billboard magazine wrote, "With this funk-injected pop shuffler, Lauper offers what may be her most accessible and charming single in a long time." He added, "A husky vocal is framed by wriggling guitars and flourishing horns, seeping into a neat, muscular bassline. And the cute chorus is a fun sing-along." In a 2014 review, the Daily Vault's Mark Millan named it a very good song and a "blunt social commentary if ever there was one". In his weekly UK chart commentary, James Masterton complimented it as a "cleverly constructed track". Holly George-Warren of Rolling Stone noted Lauper's "throaty belting". Pan-European magazine Music & Media noted that "under the productional jiggery pokery, you'll find a vintage Lauper song".

== Track listings ==
- US 7-inch single – 34 77234
- US cassette single – 34T 77234
- EU CD single – 659473 1
- UK cassette single – 659879 4
1. "That's What I Think" (Album Edit) – 4:17
2. "That's What I Think" (Live version) – 4:35
- US CD maxi–single – 49K 77234
1. "That's What I Think" (Album Edit) – 4:17
2. "That's What I Think" (Live Version) – 4:35
3. "That's What I Think" (Slugger Mix) – 6:09
4. "That's What I Think" (Deep Mix) – 5:26
5. "That's What I Think" (Musto Club Mix) – 7:07
- US 12-inch – 49 77234

A1: "That's What I Think" (Musto Club Mix) – 7:10
A2: "That's What I Think" (Musto Dub Mix) – 7:22
A3: "That's What I Think" (Musto Radio Mix) – 3:55
B1: "That's What I Think" (Vasquez Club Mix) – 5:31
B2: "That's What I Think" (Vasquez Deep Mix) – 5:18
B3: "That's What I Think" (Vasquez Factory Mix) – 5:24

- EU CD maxi-single – 659473 2
1. "That's What I Think" (Album Edit) – 4:17
2. "That's What I Think" (Live Version) – 4:35
3. "That's What I Think" (Musto Remix) – 3:41
- UK CD 1 – 659879 2
1. "That's What I Think" (Single Version) – 4:17
2. "That's What I Think" (Live Version) – 4:35
3. "That's What I Think" (Musto Club Mix) – 7:10
4. "That's What I Think" (Vasquez Club Mix) – 5:31
5. "That's What I Think" (Musto Dub Mix) – 7:22
6. "That's What I Think" (Vasquez Club Dub) – 5:26
- UK CD 2 (Limited Edition) – 659879 5
1. "That's What I Think" (Album Version) – 4:38
2. "I Drove All Night" – 4:08
3. "True Colors" – 3:46
4. "Girls Just Want to Have Fun" – 3:55
- UK 12-inch single – 659879 6

A1: "That's What I Think" (Musto Club Mix) – 7:10
A2: "That's What I Think" (Musto Dub Mix) – 7:22
A3: "That's What I Think" (Musto Tribal Mix) – 3:05
B1: "That's What I Think" (Vasquez Club Mix) – 5:31
B2: "That's What I Think" (Vasquez Club Dub) – 5:26
B3: "That's What I Think" (Vasquez Urban Dance Mix) – 6:03
B4: "That's What I Think" (Vasquez Tribal Mix) – 5:22

== Charts ==
Chart (1993–1994)	Peak position
Europe (Eurochart Hot 100)	81
UK Singles (OCC)	31
UK Airplay (Music Week)	23
UK Dance (Music Week)	12
UK Club Chart (Music Week)	25
US Hot Dance Club Play (Billboard)	14
US Hot Dance Singles Sales (Billboard)	50

== Release history ==
Release history
Region	Date	Label	Format	Cat. No.	Ref.
United Kingdom	November 1, 1993	Epic	Cassette; CD1; 12-inch	EPC 6598794; EPC 6598792; EPC 6598796	
United Kingdom	November 1993	Epic	CD2	EPC 6598795	
