= Come On Home (Cyndi Lauper song) =

1995 single by Cyndi Lauper

Single by Cyndi Lauper

from the album Twelve Deadly Cyns...and Then Some
- B-side: "Hey Now (Girls Just Want to Have Fun)"
- Released: August 14, 1995
- Length: 4:33
- Label: Epic
- Songwriters: Cyndi Lauper; Jan Pulsford
- Producers: Cyndi Lauper; Jimmy Bralower; William Wittman

Cyndi Lauper singles chronology
"I'm Gonna Be Strong ('94 Version)" (1994)	"Come On Home" (1995)	"You Don't Know" (1996)

"Come On Home" is a song recorded by American singer-songwriter Cyndi Lauper and released in August 1995 as the third and final single from her greatest hits album, Twelve Deadly Cyns...and Then Some (1994). It peaked at number 11 on the US Billboard Hot Dance Club Play chart and at number 39 on the UK Singles chart.

== Versions ==
The International version was produced by Cyndi Lauper, Jimmy Bralower and William Wittman, recorded by William Wittman and Jan Pulsford and mixed by William Wittman and is approximately 4:36 in length. It starts with a beat in the opening bar of the song, and includes a distinctive sample (male voice signing "here") throughout the track. The sample is of "Here I Stand" (written by Justin Hinds) as recorded in 1994 by Bitty McLean for his Just to Let You Know... album and "Here I Stand" single.

The US version was produced by Cyndi Lauper and Junior Vasquez, recorded by P. Dennis Mitchell with mix and additional recording from Joe 'The Butcher' Nicolo and has a runtime approximately 4:32. The version commences with a reggae-style bass/guitar riff before the beat commences, the song ends with an ad-lib, a cappella chorus.

== Critical reception ==
Steve Baltin from Cash Box described the song as "a perky new number that is infused with a slight reggae beat." In his weekly UK chart commentary in Dotmusic, James Masterton complimented the cod-reggae of "Come On Home". Pan-European magazine Music & Media commented, "Summer in the city demands for beach records. Lauper provides the sunbeams by returning to the basic charm of early reggae records by the likes of Jimmy Cliff and Desmond Dekker." A reviewer from Music Week gave the song three out of five, adding, "This track from the colourful singer's Deadly Cyns album sees her vocals sitting quite comfortably on top of some UB40-style lite reggae. Radio friendly and probably a hit."

== Track listing and formats ==
- Europe and US 12-inch vinyl single

A1. "Come On Home" (Techno Vocal) – 9:03
A2. "Come On Home" (Techno Dub) – 4:57
A3. "Come On Home" (Jungle Vox) – 6:43
B1. "Come On Home" (Junior's Sound Factory Mix) – 11:43
B2. "Come On Home" (Factory Dub) [Short Version] – 3:52
B3. "Come On Home" (Extended Club Mix) – 5:52

- UK CD single (CD1); Europe and Japan maxi-single
1. "Come On Home" (Single Edit) – 3:47
2. "Come On Home" (Junior's Sound Factory Single Version) – 4:14
3. "Come On Home" (Techno Vocal Single Version) – 4:20
4. "Hey Now (Girls Just Want to Have Fun)" [Mikey Bennet's Carnival Version featuring Patra] – 6:04
- UK CD single (CD2) (The Dance CD)
1. "Come On Home" (Techno Vox) – 9:03
2. "Come On Home" (Techno Dub) – 4:34
3. "Come On Home" (Jungle Vox) – 6:22
4. "Come On Home" (Junior's Sound Factory Mix) – 11:43
5. "Come On Home" (Factory Dub) [Short Version] – 2:40
6. "Come On Home" (Extended Club Mix) – 5:33
- Europe cassette and 2-track; Japan 2-track CD single
1. "Come On Home" (Single Edit) – 3:47
2. "Hey Now (Girls Just Want to Have Fun)" [Album Version] – 3:52

== Charts ==
Chart (1995)	Peak position
Scotland (OCC)	40
UK Singles (OCC)	39
UK Airplay (ERA)	69
US Hot Dance Club Play (Billboard)	11
Europe (Eurochart Hot 100)	100

== Release history ==
Region	Date	Format(s)	Label(s)	Ref.
United Kingdom	August 14, 1995	CD; cassette	Epic	
Japan	August 19, 1995	Mini-CD	Epic	
Japan	August 24, 1995	Maxi-CD	Epic	
United States	November 21, 1995	12-inch vinyl	Epic Dance	
