= Pop & Rock (magazine) =

Greek music magazine

Pop & Rock Ποπ & Ροκ
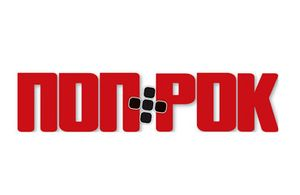
- Categories: Music
- Frequency: Monthly
- Founded: 1978
- First issue: March 1978; 48 years ago
- Final issue: 2012
- Country: Greece
- Based in: Kallithea, Attica
- Language: Greek
- Website: www.pop-rock.gr

Pop & Rock (Greek: Ποπ & Ροκ; stylized as Ποπ+Ροκ) was a Greek magazine, founded in 1978 by Giannis Petridis, Kostas Zougris and Vassos Tsimidopoulos. After its first issue, it became a popular music magazine in Greece.

Petridis and Zougris had been thinking about publishing a magazine for a while, but did not have the money to do so. By coincidence, publisher Aris Gritzalis met with Petridis and asked him about publishing a music magazine. Petridis and Zougris were then joined by Tsimidopoulos, who was a close friend of Petridis, and who also wrote in the first issues. The name came about when Tsimidopoulos suggested modelling it from the name of the French magazine Rock & Folk, with Zougris coming up with Pop & Rock.

Its headquarters were in Kallithea and the first issue was in March 1978 and featured Jimi Hendrix on the front cover. The magazine covered a wide variety of genres and topics and, from 1980, it published a monthly sales chart. After its formation in the late 1980s, the charts published in the magazine were commissioned by IFPI Greece.

Petridis was also director until 1998, when he resigned. A few years later, the magazine was bought by Μουσικοεκδοτική ('Music Publishing'), who also published Popcorn and Metal Hammer. The magazine changed publisher many times, but due to fewer and fewer sales and financial difficulties, the magazine closed in 2012.
