= The Goonies (soundtrack) =

1985 soundtrack album by various artists

The Goonies: Original Motion Picture Soundtrack

Soundtrack album by Various artists
- Released: May 20, 1985
- Recorded: Record Plant Scoring
- Length: 41:11
- Label: Epic
- Producers: Philip Bailey; Arthur Baker; Dave Grusin; David Devore; David Kahne; Lennie Petze; Joel Sill

Singles from The Goonies: Original Motion Picture Soundtrack
- 1. "The Goonies 'R' Good Enough" Released: June 6, 1985; 2. "Eight Arms to Hold You" Released: 1985

The Goonies: Original Motion Picture Soundtrack is the official soundtrack album released by Epic Records in conjunction with the adventure comedy film The Goonies (1985). The album includes the top ten single "The Goonies 'R' Good Enough" by singer Cyndi Lauper, who had a cameo in the film (as herself, singing the song on TV). The album was released in LP and cassette format internationally, and a limited CD release in some countries.

Lauper was asked by Steven Spielberg to be the musical director for the album. It was Lauper's idea to include a then-relatively unknown female group, The Bangles (the band would become better known the following year with their second album). The Bangles also had a small cameo in the video for "The Goonies 'R' Good Enough". Lauper played the song throughout her True Colors World Tour, but refused to play the song from 1987 onwards until pressure from fans finally made her add the song back into her set list, beginning with her True Colors Tour in 2007 and 2008.

"Eight Arms to Hold You" by Goon Squad, was released as the second single from the album and reached number one on the Billboard Hot Dance Club Play chart in 1985. The scene featuring the song (involving an octopus) was cut from the film. Teena Marie's contribution "14k" was released as a single and hit number ten on the R&B chart. REO Speedwagon's song "Wherever You're Goin' (It's Alright)" was released as a single in Europe, although it did not chart.

In 2010, an original score album was released featuring the entire film score by Dave Grusin.

== Track listing ==
Side one
No.	Title	Writer(s)	Performer	Length
1.	"The Goonies 'R' Good Enough"	Lauper; Stephen Broughton Lunt; Arthur Stead	Cyndi Lauper	3:37
2.	"Eight Arms to Hold You"	Arthur Baker; Jimmy Bralower; Robbie Kilgore	Goon Squad	4:21
3.	"Love Is Alive"	Bailey, Richard Marx	Philip Bailey	4:17
4.	"I Got Nothing"	Susanna Hoffs; Vicki Peterson; Jules Shear	Bangles	3:09
5.	"14K"	Marie	Teena Marie	4:59

Side two
No.	Title	Writer(s)	Performer	Length
1.	"Wherever You're Goin' (It's Alright)"	Kevin Cronin	REO Speedwagon	5:00
2.	"She's So Good to Me"	Vandross	Luther Vandross	5:40
3.	"What a Thrill"	Lauper, John Turi	Cyndi Lauper	3:17
4.	"Save the Night"	Williams, Amy LaTelevision	Joseph Williams	4:47
5.	"Theme from The Goonies"	Grusin	Dave Grusin	3:01

2008 bonus tracks

11. "Eight Arms to Hold You" (Vocal Remix) — Goon Squad
12. "The Goonies 'R' Good Enough" (Dance Remix) — Cyndi Lauper

Notes

- "Fratelli Chase" was omitted from the soundtrack, but is available on Dave Grusin's 1987 album, Cinemagic.

== Chart performance ==
Chart (1985)	Peak position
Canada Top Albums/CDs (RPM)	61
US Billboard 200	73

== Release dates ==
Region	Date	Label	Format	Catalog
United States	1985	Epic	LP/Cassette/CD	EK 40067
United States re-release	December 16, 2008	Sony	Digital download	

== Critical reception ==
Paste described the soundtrack as a compilation of "ultra-fun — albeit ultra-dated — synth-heavy, gated-drums-anchored tunes."
