= The Goonies 'R' Good Enough =

Single by Cyndi Lauper

from the album The Goonies: Original Motion Picture Soundtrack
- B-side: "What a Thrill"
- Released: June 6, 1985
- Genre: Synth-pop
- Length: 3:38
- Label: Portrait
- Songwriters: Cyndi Lauper; Stephen Broughton Lunt; Arthur Stead
- Producers: Cyndi Lauper; Lennie Petze

Cyndi Lauper singles chronology
"When You Were Mine" (1985)	"The Goonies 'R' Good Enough" (1985)	"True Colors" (1986)

Music video
- "The Goonies 'R' Good Enough" on YouTube

"The Goonies 'R' Good Enough" is a song by American pop singer Cyndi Lauper, released on June 6, 1985, from the soundtrack album The Goonies: Original Motion Picture Soundtrack (1985), released in support of the 1985 film of the same name. Written by Lauper, Stephen Broughton Lunt, and Arthur Stead in 1984, it was initially titled simply as "Good Enough"; the track was re-titled to "The Goonies 'R' Good Enough" by Warner Bros. for marketing purposes. Lauper admitted in an interview that she hated the song.

The track was a chart success, albeit slightly less successful than the singles from her debut studio album She's So Unusual (1983). It peaked at number 10 on the US Billboard Hot 100, becoming her fifth top-ten single. Internationally, the track peaked within the top-ten in Australia and Canada. It was not found on Lauper's major 1994 greatest hits collection Twelve Deadly Cyns...and Then Some, but was included on the release of The Essential Cyndi Lauper in 2003.

"The Goonies 'R' Good Enough" was supported with a two-part music video directed by Richard Donner.

== Background ==
Filmmaker and executive producer of The Goonies, Steven Spielberg, had made Lauper the musical director for The Goonies soundtrack. She sought out new bands to be included in the project including her friends, the Bangles. Lauper refused to play the song live after 1987. She finally incorporated it back into her live show during several dates in Australia in 2004. Fans kept requesting the song and Lauper eventually sang the first verse and chorus a cappella. Due to overwhelming fan recognition, she has since incorporated the song back into her live set.

== Composition ==
The instrumental bridge was originally written in a different style than was eventually used.

== Critical reception ==
Cashbox said that the song "captures a wealth of true feeling within a superficial setting." European magazine Eurotipsheet named the song one of its "records of the week" in its issue dated May 27, 1985. Dave Sholin of Gavin Report gave the track a favorable review saying, "All I know is that the picture is called "Goonies" and it's a story by Steven Spielberg and that's enough to qualify Cyndi Lauper to offer her unusual talents to the soundtrack. Fun song that we'll all no doubt be humming all summer long."

Record Mirror was less positive in its review, noting that "even Cyndi's impressive tonsils fail to inject much life into this song".

== Chart performance ==
"The Goonies 'R' Good Enough" debuted on the US Billboard Hot 100 the week of May 18, 1985, at number 45, becoming the third highest-debuting single of the week. It entered the Top 40 of the chart the week of June 1, 1985, at number 36. It would reach its peak position of number 10 on July 13, 1985, becoming Lauper's fifth top ten single (six if counting her contribution in the 1985 charity single "We Are the World" as part of USA for Africa). The track however only spent 15 weeks in total and did not crack the 1985 Hot 100 year-end chart. Internationally, the track hit the top-ten in Australia and Canada. The track also entered the charts in Italy, New Zealand, and West Germany. Notably, "The Goonies 'R' Good Enough" did not enter the UK Singles Chart, and as such British copies are rare to find.

== Music video ==
=== Background and release ===
Richard Donner directed the two-part music video for "The Goonies 'R' Good Enough". Multiple celebrities are featured in the video including WWE professional wrestlers "Captain" Lou Albano, "Rowdy" Roddy Piper, Wendi Richter, The Fabulous Moolah, The Iron Sheik, Nikolai Volkoff, Freddie Blassie and André the Giant (the last being only in Part 2), Steven Spielberg, Lauper's manager at the time David Wolff, the majority of The Goonies cast (minus Kerri Green, Anne Ramsey, Joe Pantoliano, Robert Davi and John Matuszak) and The Bangles (selected by Lauper to be part of the movie's soundtrack album) as a group of female pirates. Lauper's mother appears as "Catrina, Cyndi's mother" and the "sea hag."

Part 1 of the video was released to MTV on May 7, 1985, and Part 2 debuted after the film opened on June 7. On the DVD of The Goonies, both parts have been spliced together to form one video with no chapter change in the middle of the two. Part 1 of the music video had an extended version released in Japan. The version included more commentary from the voice over during the opening sequence of the video and extended scenes inside the gas station and with the wrestlers. Part 1 of the video almost did not make it onto the DVD due to Warner Bros.' inability to find the broadcast master tape. Warner was ready to start pressing the DVD when someone at VH1 found an unused mastered broadcast copy of the tape that was sent to their network. In the nick of time, it was digitized and put on the DVD before pressing began. The music video was shot on film then edited and mastered on video tape for broadcast.

=== Synopsis ===
==== Part 1 ====
Lauper in the two-part music video directed by Richard Donner.

Cyndi Lauper's character, referred to as Cyndi, works at her parents' gas station, along with her friends Dave (David Wolff) and Wendi (Wendi Richter). Cyndi's Mom is baking cookies for gas station customers, and Wendi operates a vegetable stand (set up inside a miniature wrestling ring) outside the station. A group of creditors (Roddy Piper, Freddie Blassie, Iron Sheik, and Nikolai Volkoff) show up to evict them and take over the station. While they argue with Mom and Pop (Lou Albano), an old woman (The Fabulous Moolah) shows up and closes down Wendi's vegetable stand, putting in a Benihana-like set-up in its place. While packing, Cyndi removes a picture from the wall, which reveals the entrance to a cavern. Searching through the cave, Cyndi finds a treasure map and then encounters six of the Goonies (Sean Astin, Josh Brolin, Jeff Cohen, Corey Feldman, Martha Plimpton, and Ke Huy Quan) who also have a copy of the map.

Soon after, they encounter a group of pirates (who look just like the creditors, though it is never said if they are the same people as the creditors), and a supposed green-faced witch. Cyndi runs away as the Goonies are captured by the pirates. Running through the caverns, she encounters several skeletons and even some chefs who seem to work for the restaurant Benihana. Cyndi eventually finds herself trapped between the pirates and the green-faced witch on a log bridge. Unsure what to do, she cries out "Steven Spielberg, how do I get out of this one?" The scene cuts to Spielberg in an editing room, apparently in the midst of editing the video as it is happening. Spielberg stops the editing machine and begins to give a solution, before realizing that he does not know how to help Cyndi.

==== Part 2 ====
Cyndi and the Goonies are captured and taken aboard a pirate ship. The pirates, along with the green-faced witch and some female pirates (the Bangles), party while forcing the Goonies and Cyndi to prepare food for them. Dave and Wendi (who had also gone into the cave to look for Cyndi) have also been captured and are tied to the mast of the ship. Eventually, Cyndi, Dave, Wendi, and the Goonies break free, and after finding some treasure on the ship, toss some of it to the pirates, who fight amongst themselves for it. After subduing the green-faced witch, the Goonies escape from the ship along with Cyndi and her friends, giving her the remaining treasure that they found.

Cyndi, along with Dave and Wendi, returns through the cavern entrance in the gas station, armed with the extra treasure in hopes of appeasing the creditors. Despite all the treasure she offers, they still refuse. Cyndi then whistles and in a cloud of smoke, André the Giant appears. He chases the creditors off with "Rowdy" Roddy Piper apparently breaking character, calling out to director Richard Donner, Spielberg, Lauper, and Wolff that "the video wasn't supposed to end like this" while being pursued by André. The family then celebrates its good fortune.

== Covers and use in popular culture ==
Several artists, such as Bombones, Haruko Momoi, The Advantage, New Found Glory, Radical Face, Minibosses, and Tomoyuki Uchida have covered the song. The song was featured in several iterations of Konami's Goonies video games, most notably The Goonies (1986) for the Family Computer and The Goonies II (1987) for the Nintendo Entertainment System (NES). It was also featured in an instrumental version in Pop'n Music 10. In 2012, Lauper performed a parody version entitled "Taffy Butt" for the second-season premiere episode of the Fox animated television series Bob's Burgers; the episode is an homage to The Goonies. Her son, a fan of the series, insisted she record the new version. In 2014, "The Goonies 'R' Good Enough" was heavily featured in a Goonies-themed episode of the ABC comedy series The Goldbergs.

== Track listing ==
Standard 7-inch single

1. "The Goonies 'R' Good Enough" – 3:27
2. "What a Thrill" – 3:00

US and European 12-inch single

1. "The Goonies 'R' Good Enough" (Dance Re-Mix) – 5:25
2. "The Goonies 'R' Good Enough" (Dub Version) – 5:29

UK 12-inch single

1. "The Goonies 'R' Good Enough" (Dance Remix) – 5:25
2. "The Goonies 'R' Good Enough" (Dub Version) – 5:29
3. "What a Thrill" – 3:00

== Personnel ==
Taken from The Goonies: Original Motion Picture Soundtrack liner notes.

- Cyndi Lauper – lead vocals
- Robbie Kilgore – Prophet-5
- Alan Pasqua – Memorymoog; Juno-60
- Michael Boddicker – DX7; synth bass
- Arthur Stead, Lennie Petze – rhythm guitar
- Jimmy Bralower – LinnDrum; percussion
- Louise Di Tullio – flute
- Emil Richards – marimba
- Robert Davi – backing vocals

== Charts ==
=== Weekly charts ===
Chart (1985)	Peak position
Australia (Kent Music Report)	8
Canada Top Singles (RPM)	9
Italy (Musica e dischi)	25
Japan (Oricon)	42
Mexico (La Opinión)	8
New Zealand (Recorded Music NZ)	22
US Billboard Hot 100	10
US Cash Box Top 100	14
US Top 40 (Gavin Report)	10
US Contemporary Hit Radio (Radio & Records)	11
West Germany (GfK)	49

=== Year-end charts ===
Chart (1985)	Position
Australia (Kent Music Report)	84
Canada Top Singles (RPM)	85
Peru (La Opinión)	25
US Top 40 (Gavin Report)	88

== Certifications ==
Region	Certification	Certified units/sales
Canada (Music Canada)	Gold	50,000^{^}
^{^} Shipments figures based on certification alone.

== Release history ==
Release dates and format(s) for "The Goonies 'R' Good Enough"
Region	Date	Format(s)	Label(s)	Ref.
United States	May 6, 1985	Radio airplay	Portrait; Epic	
Australia	June 17, 1985	7-inch; 12-inch	Portrait	
Japan	June 21, 1985	7-inch; 12-inch	Portrait	
United Kingdom	July 1, 1985	7-inch	Portrait	
United Kingdom	July 8, 1985	12-inch	Portrait	
