= Sally's Pigeons =

Single by Cyndi Lauper

from the album Hat Full of Stars
- B-side: "Cold", "Like I Used To", "Someone Like Me", "Feels Like Christmas"
- Released: June 15, 1993
- Recorded: 1993
- Studio: Right Track Recording (New York, NY); The Enchanted Cottage
- Genre: Pop
- Length: 3:48
- Label: Epic
- Songwriters: Cyndi Lauper; Mary Chapin Carpenter
- Producers: Cyndi Lauper; Junior Vasquez

Cyndi Lauper singles chronology
"That's What I Think" (1993)	"Sally's Pigeons" (1993)	"Hat Full of Stars" (1993)

Music video
- "Sally's Pigeons" on YouTube

"Sally's Pigeons" is a pop song by Cyndi Lauper that was featured on her 1993 album Hat Full of Stars. It was released as the album's second single in some countries, and as its third in others. The song was inspired by the story of a childhood friend of Lauper, who in her teens got pregnant, had a back-alley abortion, and died as a result.

The song was re-released as a single in 1994 in some European countries to promote Cyndi's greatest hits album Twelve Deadly Cyns...and Then Some.

Cyndi released a new version of the song on June 24, 2022, in response to the repeal of Roe v. Wade.

== Background ==
The song was co-written in 1991 with Mary Chapin Carpenter. Lauper was a childhood fan of Elton John, and as a tribute to him, "Sally's Pigeons" contains references to "Tiny Dancer", a song that Lauper stated has always made her cry. The song's music video features Julia Stiles and Blaze Berdahl, the latter portraying Sally.

== Release ==
"Sally's Pigeons" began receiving radio adds in France and the Czech Republic in April 1993. It also received adds in Spain in August 1993.

== Critical reception ==
Mike DeGagne of AllMusic spoke of the song in a review of the Hat Full of Stars album, stating, "The title track and "That's What I Think", along with "Sally's Pigeons", make for the most promising of the 11 cuts." In the December 23, 1995, issue of the Billboard magazine, the song was mentioned in "The Critics' Choice" section, where the magazine's editors and writers chose their top 10 records, videos and live concerts of 1995. Chuck Taylor, the magazine's radio editor, listed Lauper's 1995 compilation Twelve Deadly Cyns...and Then Some at #6 of his top ten albums, stating, "Kickin' longform video, too. Discover of "Sally's Pigeons" is a high point. Thanks, girl, I had fun." The Daily Vault's Mark Millan said it is a very good song, describing it as "heart wrenching".

== Music video ==
A music video was made to accompany the song. It was Julia Stiles' acting debut. One of the "little girls in pony-tails" described in the song's lyrics is played by former Ford model Valerie Mendler. Sally is credited as being portrayed by Blaze Berdahl although the lyrics of the song indicate that Sally is a man.

== Track listing ==
CD single (Europe) / Cassette single (Europe) / 7" single (Europe)

1. "Sally's Pigeons" – 3:46
2. "Cold" – 3:29

CD Maxi-single (Europe) / 12" single (Europe)

1. "Sally's Pigeons" – 3:46
2. "Cold" – 3:29
3. "Like I Used To" – 4:28

CD single (Europe) – 1994 Reissue

1. "Sally's Pigeons" – 3:46
2. "Someone Like Me" – 4:03

CD Maxi-single (Europe) – 1994 Reissue

1. "Sally's Pigeons" – 3:46
2. "Feels Like Christmas" – 4:37
3. "Someone Like Me" – 4:03

7" single (United States) – 2022 Redux

1. "Sally's Pigeons" – 3:46
