= Shine (Cyndi Lauper song) =

Single by Cyndi Lauper

from the album Shine
- B-side: "Higher Plane"
- Released: July 2, 2002
- Recorded: 2001
- Genre: Pop rock
- Length: 3:44
- Label: Oglio Records; Fly-Life Music; Unimusic Corp
- Songwriter(s): Cyndi Lauper; William Wittman
- Producer(s): Carl Caprioglio; William Wittman

Cyndi Lauper singles chronology
"Disco Inferno" (1999)	"Shine" (2002)	"Walk On By" (2003)

"Shine" is the title track and only single released from American singer Cyndi Lauper's eighth album Shine.

== Song information ==
It was performed for the first time at Vienna, City Hall (Aids Benefit) on June 16, 2001.

This song has been remixed by several people, including Victor Calderone and Tracy Young. It caused the song to be a hit in the clubs.

"Shine" was remixed into a dance track for a climactic fifth-season episode of the American version of Queer as Folk. Lauper appeared as herself to perform the song at the show's "Babylon" dance club. Since then, the performance has been used as a video clip for the song.

The first official release of the song appeared on the Shine E.P., a 2002 mini album released to counteract heavy infringement of the material on the then-shelved full-length album. The album itself, however, was not released in the U.S. Before the official release of the album (exclusively in Japan), a maxi-single was released for the song, in a variety of formats. This limited edition was only released in the United States. The official name of the single is "Shine Remixes".

== Critical reception ==
Upon its release, Chuck Taylor of Billboard described the song as "mint, vintage Cyndi Lauper" and her "best song in years". He added: "Lauper resonates with both strength and a shimmer of vulnerability - she packs more sentiment into just the word "Shine" than many performers might deliver in an entire aria."

== Track listing ==
US CD single (CD5 / 5") (Shine Remix)

1. Shine (Tracy Young Mix) - 13:11
2. Shine (Tracy Young Mix Instrumental) - 13:19
3. Shine (Illicit) Mix - 8:39
4. Shine (Illicit Mix Instrumental) - 8:41
5. Shine (A cappella) - 5:18
6. Higher Plane (Bonus Track) - 4:13

== Cover versions ==
Alan Cumming performed a cover version of "Shine" on his first album, I Bought a Blue Car Today.
