= Change of Heart (Cyndi Lauper song) =

Single by Cyndi Lauper

from the album True Colors
- B-side: "Heartbeats" "Witness" "What a Thrill"
- Released: November 11, 1986
- Recorded: 1986
- Studio: Power Station (New York, NY); The Hit Factory (New York, NY)
- Genre: Dance-pop
- Length: 4:22; 3:58 (single edit)
- Label: Portrait
- Songwriters: Cyndi Lauper; Essra Mohawk
- Producers: Cyndi Lauper; Lennie Petze

Cyndi Lauper singles chronology
"True Colors" (1986)	"Change of Heart" (1986)	"What's Going On" (1987)

Music video
- "Change of Heart" on YouTube

"Change of Heart" is a song by American singer and songwriter Cyndi Lauper, released on November 11, 1986 as the second single from her second album, True Colors (1986). It went gold in the US, peaking at No. 3 on the Billboard Hot 100. The song was written by singer-songwriter Essra Mohawk. Popular remixes by Shep Pettibone were also released. A music video was produced for the song, filmed in Trafalgar Square in London. It features Lauper and her tour band (including David Rosenthal on keyboards) performing the song in front of a large group of people. The Bangles sang background vocals on the original recording. A live version of the song was released on Lauper's live album/DVD, To Memphis, with Love.

== Critical response ==
Jimmy Guterman of Rolling Stone magazine said of the song in his album review for True Colors, "...Lauper's trademark hiccuped syllables rest on a cushion of harmonies supplied by The Bangles and transform what is little more than a sophisticated rhythm track with nominal lyrics into a heartfelt declaration of fidelity."

Cash Box called it "tough and tender" and praised the "punchy" guitars and rhythm track. Billboard called it "solid rock" that's "neither wacky nor idiosyncratic."

== Music video ==
The official music video for the song was directed by Andy Morahan. It features Lauper and her tour band playing informal gigs in public locations in London, including Trafalgar Square, Leicester Square (with a clear shot of the poster for A Nightmare on Elm Street 2: Freddy's Revenge being visible at the Odeon), Covent Garden, and Westminster Bridge / The Queen's Walk, where the London Eye is currently located, 13 years before its opening.

== Track listing ==
US 12" single
No.	Title	Length
1.	"Change of Heart (Extended Version)"	7:52
2.	"Heartbeats"	4:49
3.	"Change of Heart (Instrumental)"	5:52
4.	"Witness"	3:38

US 7" single
No.	Title	Length
1.	"Change of Heart"	3:58
2.	"Witness"	3:38

UK 12" single
No.	Title	Length
1.	"Change of Heart (Extended Version)"	7:52
2.	"Heartbeats"	4:49
3.	"Change of Heart (Instrumental)"	5:52
4.	"What a Thrill"	3:00

UK 7" single
No.	Title	Length
1.	"Change of Heart"	3:58
2.	"What a Thrill"	3:00

== Credits and personnel ==
- Cyndi Lauper – co-production, vocals
- Essra Mohawk – songwriting
- Lennie Petze – co-production
- Shep Pettibone – mixing
- Nile Rodgers – guitar
- The Latin Rascals – editing
- Steve Peck – engineer
- The Bangles – backing vocals

Credits adapted from the album liner notes.

== Charts ==
"Change of Heart" debuted on the Billboard Hot 100 at No. 67 and reached a peak position of No. 3 on the issue dated 14 February 1987, spending a total of 17 weeks on the chart. It had similar success in the Hot Dance/Club Play Songs chart, hitting No. 4. The song placed at No. 61 on the year-end chart of 1987. In Canada, the song debuted at No. 88 on the RPM issue dated 13 December 1986. After 10 weeks, it reached a peak position of No. 13 and spent a total of 17 weeks in the chart. In the United Kingdom, "Change of Heart" debuted at No. 96 on the UK Singles Chart and was Lauper's least successful UK single to date, only reaching No. 67. Across Europe, "Change of Heart" peaked at No. 8 in France and sold out 200.000 copies.

=== Weekly charts ===
Weekly chart performance for "Change of Heart"
Chart (1986–1987)	Peak position
Australia (Kent Music Report)	15
Canada Top Singles (RPM)	13
Chile (Chilean Singles Chart)	4
European Hot 100 Singles (Music & Media)	54
Finland (Suomen virallinen lista)	29
France (SNEP)	8
Greece (IFPI Greece)	5
Mexico (AMPROFON)	6
Mexico Hit Parade (RPM)	4
New Zealand (Recorded Music NZ)	41
Puerto Rico (UPI)	5
UK Singles (Official Charts)	67
US Billboard Hot 100	3
US Dance Club Songs (Billboard)	4
US Dance Singles Sales (Billboard)	9
US Cash Box Top 100	4

=== Year-end charts ===
Year-end chart performance for "Change of Heart"
Chart (1987)	Position
US Billboard Hot 100	61

== Release history ==
Release dates and formats for "Change of Heart"
Region	Date	Label(s)	Format(s)	Cat. No.	Ref.
United Kingdom	November 17, 1986	Portrait	7-inch; 12-inch	CYNDI 1; CYNDI T1	
United Kingdom	December 22, 1986	Portrait	7-inch gatefold sleeve; 7-inch picture disc	CYNDI G1; CYNDI P1	
