= Who Let In the Rain =

"Who Let in the Rain"

Single by Cyndi Lauper

from the album Hat Full of Stars
- B-side: "Cold"
- Released: June 22, 1993
- Recorded: 1993
- Studio: The Hit Factory (New York, NY)
- Genre: Pop; soul; R&B
- Length: 4:37
- Label: Epic
- Songwriters: Cyndi Lauper; Allee Willis
- Producers: Cyndi Lauper; Junior Vasquez

Cyndi Lauper singles chronology
"The World Is Stone" (1992)	"Who Let in the Rain" (1993)	"That's What I Think" (1993)

Music video
- "Who Let In the Rain" on YouTube

"Who Let in the Rain" is a song by American singer, songwriter and actress Cyndi Lauper, from her fourth studio album, Hat Full of Stars (1993). Released as the lead single from the album on June 22, 1993 by Epic Records, it is a ballad about the end of a relationship that proved popular among Lauper's fans. It was written by Lauper and Allee Willis. Outside the United States, it was a modest hit peaking in the top 40 in the UK (where it was released in December 1993 as the second single from the album) and New Zealand. In the US, the song failed to make the Billboard Hot 100 and reached only as high as number 33 on the Billboard Adult Contemporary singles chart.

Its release featured a B-side called "Cold", an up-beat track from the Hat Full of Stars sessions. Junior Vasquez produced the song with Lauper. He produced most of the rest of the album as well. Lauper wrote the song with Allee Willis.

Lauper re-recorded "Who Let in the Rain" for her Shine album, which was released in Japan in 2004.

== Critical reception ==
Mike DeGagne from AllMusic named the song one of the "courageous attempts" on the Hat Full of Stars album. Larry Flick from Billboard magazine wrote, "It has been way too long since Cyndi's unique voice has filled pop radio's airwaves. She is likely to be warmly welcomed back to the fold with this sad, introspective ballad from her forthcoming album". He added, "Track grows from a soft stance", like on Lauper's classic "Time After Time", "building to an appropriately emotional climax." The Daily Vault's Mark Millan noted in his album review, that "the mood is lightened with the R&B flavored 'Who Let In the Rain'", noting that it "find the Lauper of old creeping through". Pan-European magazine Music & Media commented, "Take no pauper if you can get La Lauper. This first single from the forthcoming album Hat Full Of Stars is a nice drizzle, while the bonus track 'Cold' is a real cloudburst." Alan Jones from Music Week complimented it as "a pleasant, low-key affair which builds nicely without ever completely breaking out."

== Formats and track listings ==
- US 7-inch single – 34 74942
- US CD single – 34K 74942
- US cassette single – 34T 74942
- EU CD single – 650939 1
- UK cassette single – 659039 4
- EU / UK 7-inch single – 650939 7
1. "Who Let in the Rain" (Edit) – 4:15
2. "Cold" – 3:29
- AUS CD single / EU CD maxi-single / UK CD 1 – 659039 2
- EU 12-inch single – 659039 6
- AUS cassette single – 659039 8
1. "Who Let in the Rain" (Edit) – 4:15
2. "Cold" – 3:29
3. "Like I Used To" – 4:28
- UK CD2 (Limited Edition) – 659039 5
1. "Who Let in the Rain" (Album Version) – 4:35
2. "Girls Just Want to Have Fun" (Junior Vasquez Remix) – 6:30
3. "That's What I Think" (Deep Mix) – 5:26
4. "Girls Just Want to Have Fun" (Junior Vasquez Radio Remix) – 3:39

== Charts ==
Chart (1993)	Peak position
Australia (ARIA)	109
Canada Top Singles (RPM)	76
Canada Adult Contemporary (RPM)	19
Chile (Chilean Singles Chart)	27
Europe (Eurochart Hot 100)	90
New Zealand (RIANZ)	12
UK Singles (OCC)	32
UK Airplay (ERA)	45
US Adult Contemporary (Billboard)	33

== Release history ==
Release history
Region	Date	Label	Format	Cat. No.	Ref.
United Kingdom	December 29, 1993	Epic	7-inch; Cassette; CD1	6590397; 6590394; 6590392	
United Kingdom	January 1994	Epic	CD2	6590395	
