= She Bop =

- 7-inch vinyl single

Single by Cyndi Lauper

from the album She's So Unusual
- B-side: "Witness"
- Released: July 2, 1984
- Recorded: 1983
- Studio: Record Plant (New York City)
- Genre: New wave; dance-pop; pop rock
- Length: 3:47; 4:36 (video version)
- Label: Portrait; Epic
- Songwriters: Cyndi Lauper; Stephen Broughton Lunt; Gary Corbett; Rick Chertoff
- Producer: Rick Chertoff

Cyndi Lauper singles chronology
"Time After Time" (1984)	"She Bop" (1984)	"All Through the Night" (1984)

Music video
- "She Bop" on YouTube

"She Bop" is a song by American singer-songwriter Cyndi Lauper, written by Lauper, Stephen Broughton Lunt, Gary Corbett, and Rick Chertoff, and produced by the lattermost. It was released on July 2, 1984, via Portrait Records as the third single from her debut studio album She's So Unusual (1983). Lyrically, the song talks about the subject of female masturbation, which caused controversy upon its release at the time.

One of Lauper's most successful singles, "She Bop" peaked within the top ten of the US Billboard Hot 100, reaching number three in September 1984. The track peaked within the top ten of Australia and New Zealand, reached the top twenty of the European Hot 100 Singles chart, and topped the Israeli Singles Chart. Due to a lack of promotion, the track stalled at number 46 in the United Kingdom. The music video for the track, which utilized animated segments and multiple visual effects, would receive a nomination at the 1985 MTV Video Music Awards for Best Female Video. Lauper would re-record a quieter version of the song for her 2005 studio album The Body Acoustic.

== Recording and composition ==
"She Bop" moves at a tempo of 137 beats per minute. The song was recorded at Record Plant Studios in New York City and was produced by Rick Chertoff. Lauper said she recorded the song naked in an interview with The Howard Stern Show.

=== Lyrical content ===
The track is an ode to masturbation. It was included on the Parents Music Resource Center's "Filthy Fifteen" list in 1984 due to it being considered "profane or sexually explicit"; this led to the creation of the Parental Advisory sticker. Lauper has stated that finding a copy of gay men's magazine Blueboy lying around in the recording studio provided the impetus for writing "She Bop". The magazine is mentioned in the first verse.

== Reception ==
Cash Box said that "with characteristic zaniness, Lauper takes a be-bop back beat and sparks it with an inspired vocal that pops and chirps with rhythmic intensity."

Billboard described "She Bop" as "Yet another radically different style from the not-so-daffy new star" and "hard rock bordering on metal, with a nonsense chorus to lighten the tone". The remix by Arthur Baker on the 12-inch single was described by Billboard as a "radical" rework which was "full of new, rhythmic crosscurrents".

== Chart performance ==
"She Bop" was released on July 2, 1984. It debuted on the Billboard Hot 100 at No. 52 in the issue dated July 21, 1984, and spent a total of 18 weeks on the chart, reaching a peak position of No. 3 in the issue dated September 8, 1984. It was the third single from Lauper's debut album to make the top 10 of the Hot 100. With "She Bop", Lauper became the first female artist to reach the top 3 of the Billboard Hot 100 with her first three chart entries, and her album She's So Unusual became the fourth debut album, and first by a female artist, to achieve three Top-10 hits (following Introducing... The Beatles, Lionel Richie and Kissing to Be Clever by Culture Club).

The single also reached number 10 on the Hot Dance/Club Play Songs chart the week of September 15, 1984, and placed at 34 on the Billboard year-end chart of 1984. On April 17, 1989, the song was certified gold by the Recording Industry Association of America (RIAA) for the shipment of half a million copies across the United States.

"She Bop" peaked at numbers 16 and 24 on the Hot 100 Sales and Airplay charts respectively, although this was on the inaugural published chart, which was long after the song had peaked on the Hot 100.

== Music video ==
The accompanying music video for "She Bop" was directed by Edd Griles. Mark Marek designed the characters in the animated sections of this music video, which were produced and directed by Jerry Lieberman, of NYC's Jerry Lieberman Productions, and the cover of the US 12" version. Wendi Richter, Lou Albano, and Gary Howard Klar appear in the video, with Richter lip-synching the first line of the song.

The video expands upon the references to masturbation in the song's lyrics, although not overtly. Among the images presented are an upright bottle shooting mayonnaise into the air, a sign at a gas station that displays 'GIT OFF HERE', gas pumps (labelled 'good x', 'better xx', 'nirvana xxx', 'single', and 'multiple'), a large sign that reads "Self Service", a dance sequence where Lauper portrays a blind person with a cane, and that same person winning a game of "Masterbingo"– both a reference to the myth that masturbation causes blindness. Most of the more blatant references appear during the animated instrumental sequence, although subtle images are seen throughout the live action scenes.

At the 1985 MTV Video Music Awards, the video was nominated for "Best Female Video", but lost to Tina Turner's "What's Love Got to Do with It".

British music magazine Melody Maker complimented the video, noting that it worked well because "Lauper has a certain Boop-cheeked charm" and also because of the "superb bits of animation" used in it.

== Formats and track listings ==
- US/UK 7" single
1. "She Bop" – 3:47
2. "Witness" – 3:40
- US 12" single
1. "She Bop" (Special Dance Mix) – 6:16
2. "She Bop" (Instrumental) – 6:30
- UK 12" single
1. "She Bop" (Special Dance Mix) – 6:16
2. "She Bop" (Instrumental) – 5:20 (stated)
3. "Witness" – 3:40

== Official versions ==
1. Album version – 3:42
2. Single version – 3:47 (7" single)
3. Special dance mix – 6:27 (12" single)
4. Instrumental – 5:21 (12" single)
5. Video mix – 4:35 (Philippines 7" single)
6. Live at Le Zenith (Recorded 1987) – 5:12 (From Heading West UK single – CD & 12" versions)
7. Live at Irvine Meadows (Recorded 1983) – 5:20 (From She's So Unusual 2000 CD reissue)
8. The Body Acoustic Version – 4:16 (From The Body Acoustic)
9. Live (True Colors Live 2008) – 3:46 (From True Colors Live 2008 EP)
10. Live at the Warehouse, Memphis – 4:04 (From To Memphis, with Love)
11. Live (Front and Center Presents) – 3:59 (From Front and Center Presents Cyndi Lauper) (2014)

== Charts ==
=== Weekly charts ===
Chart (1984–1985)	Peak position
Australia (Kent Music Report)	6
Austria (Ö3 Austria Top 40)	5
Belgium (Ultratop 50 Flanders)	31
Belgium (VRT Top 30 Flanders)	27
Canada Top Singles (RPM)	3
Canada (CHUM)	5
Chile (Clasificación Nacional del Disco)	8
European Top 100 Singles (Music & Media)	17
European Airplay Top 50 (Music & Media)	12
France (SNEP)	34
Finland (Suomen virallinen lista)	22
Guatemala (UPI)	8
Israel (Israeli Singles Chart)	1
Japan (Oricon)	44
Netherlands (Dutch Top 40)	34
Netherlands (Single Top 100)	41
New Zealand (Recorded Music NZ)	6
Puerto Rico (UPI)	7
South Africa (Springbok Radio)	6
Switzerland (Schweizer Hitparade)	10
UK Singles (Official Charts)	46
US Billboard Hot 100	3
US Dance/Disco Top 80 (Billboard)	10
US Mainstream Rock (Billboard)	27
US Cash Box Top 100	3
US Top 40 (Gavin Report)	3
US AOR Hot Tracks (Radio & Records)	26
US Contemporary Hit Radio (Radio & Records)	2
West Germany (GfK)	19
Zimbabwe (ZIMA)	15

=== Year-end charts ===
Chart (1984)	Position
Australia (Kent Music Report)	61
Austria (Ö3 Austria Top 40)	27
Canada Top Singles (RPM)	25
Israel (Israeli Singles Chart)	11
US Billboard Hot 100	34
US Cash Box Top 100	23
US Top 40 (Gavin Report)	26
US Contemporary Hit Radio (Radio & Records)	28

== Certifications ==
Region	Certification	Certified units/sales
Canada (Music Canada)	Gold	50,000^{^}
United States (RIAA)	Gold	500,000^{^}
^{^} Shipments figures based on certification alone.

== Awards and nominations ==
Won

- 1985 – BMI Awards for Pop Award

Nominations

- 1985 – MTV Video Music Award for Best Female Video

== Release history ==
Release dates and formats for "She Bop"
Region	Date	Format(s)	Label(s)	Ref.
United States	July 2, 1984	7-inch; 12-inch	Portrait	
Japan	July 21, 1984	7-inch; 12-inch	Portrait	
United Kingdom	August 13, 1984	7-inch; 12-inch	Portrait; Epic	
United Kingdom	August 27, 1984	5-inch picture disc single	Portrait; Epic	

== Cover versions ==
- Howie Beno and Cruella DeVille recorded a version of the song for the 1999 movie Jawbreaker.
- Hong Kong singer Aaron Kwok recorded a Cantonese and a Mandarin version of the song, both called "絕對美麗".
- Greek band Matisse covered the song for their 2007 album, Toys Up.
- Chilean hard rock band Betty Black Boots covers this song in their presentations in the Chilean rock scene.
- In July 2008, J-pop singer Nana Kitade covered "She Bop" for the album We Love Cyndi – Tribute to Cyndi Lauper; another version of the cover was featured on her 2009 album Bondage.
- South Korean pop singer Wax covered the song. Her version of it is called "Oppa", which means "Brother".
- American heavy metal band Gwar performed a version of the song in October 2015 for The A.V. Club's A.V. Undercover series, in a medley with The Ramones' "Blitzkrieg Bop".
- Ex-Reuben frontman Jamie Lenman covered the song for his 2019 album Shuffle.
