= True Colors (Cyndi Lauper song) =

1986 single by Cyndi Lauper

Single by Cyndi Lauper

from the album True Colors
- B-side: "Heading for the Moon"
- Released: August 15, 1986
- Studio: Power Station, The Hit Factory (New York City)
- Genre: Synth-rock
- Length: 3:46
- Label: Epic
- Songwriters: Tom Kelly; Billy Steinberg
- Producers: Cyndi Lauper; Lennie Petze

Cyndi Lauper singles chronology
"The Goonies 'R' Good Enough" (1985)	"True Colors" (1986)	"Change of Heart" (1986)

Music video
- "True Colors" on YouTube

"True Colors" is a song written by American songwriters Billy Steinberg and Tom Kelly. It was both the title track and the first single released from American singer-songwriter and actress Cyndi Lauper's second studio album of the same name (1986). Produced by Lauper and Lennie Petze, and released in August 1986 by Epic Records, the song spent two weeks at number one on the US Billboard Hot 100, being Lauper's second and last single to occupy the top of the chart. It received a Grammy Award nomination for Best Female Pop Vocal Performance. The accompanying music video was directed by Patricia Birch.

== Composition ==
Billy Steinberg originally wrote "True Colors" about his own mother. Tom Kelly altered the first verse and the duo originally submitted the song to Anne Murray, who passed on recording it, and then to Cyndi Lauper. Their demo was in the form of a piano-based gospel ballad like "Bridge over Troubled Water". Steinberg told Songfacts that "Cyndi completely dismantled that sort of traditional arrangement and came up with something that was breathtaking and stark." Other songs they wrote for Lauper include "I Drove All Night" and "Unconditional Love".

== Critical reception ==
Jerry Smith of the Music Week magazine deemed that "Lauper's fragile little girl voice" perfectly matches with this "effective ballad with its sympathetic, sparse accompaniment", but also added that this "downbeat style" was unlikely to make the song memorable. Di Cross of Record Mirror was strongly critical of "True Colors", stating that Lauper "does nothing to restore her flagging credibility rating with a dire, slushy attempt at an emotional ballad, the mixture curdled further by some appalling little girl vocals, complete with whispering asides and chest beating passion play".

The pan-European magazine Music & Media named "True Colors" one of its "records of the week" in the issue dated September 6, 1986.

== Chart performance ==
"True Colors" reached number one on the Billboard Hot 100 on October 25, 1986. It also peaked at number three in Australia and Portugal, and number 12 on the UK Singles Chart.

== Music video ==
The music video for "True Colors", which received heavy rotation on MTV, was directed by American choreographer Patricia Birch. In the video, Lauper sings on a dark soundstage, sitting beside a drum and holding a black flower. A young girl who explores a beach takes the flower and ends up seeing two women, one light-skinned and one dark-skinned, drinking tea on a boat. Lauper appears on the beach in an elaborate jeweled headdress with a shell in her hand. She is then seen lying on a white sheet, which a long haired man (David Wolff) proceeds to pull. They eventually share a kiss. Lauper is then seen walking on the beach with a skirt made of newspaper while she walks past a class of schoolchildren. At the end of the video, she leans over a pool of water, in a scene reminiscent of the album photo cover. The video ends as it began, only now, Lauper is beating on the drum four times, in time with the music.

== Legacy ==
The single has become a popular anthem in the gay community. In various interviews, Lauper elaborated that the song had resonated with her because of the recent death of her friend, Gregory Natal, from HIV/AIDS. Years later, Lauper co-founded the True Colors Fund, a non-profit organization dedicated to eradicating LGBT youth homelessness. On December 13, 2022, Lauper performed the song at the ceremony where US President Joe Biden signed the Respect for Marriage Act into law. In 2025, Billboard magazine ranked it number nine in their list of "The 100 Greatest LGBTQ+ Anthems of All Time".

"True Colors" was also featured in a 1999 promo for PBS Kids, a children's programming brand of the American public television network PBS.

== Tours ==
Lauper embarked on a True Colors Tour in 2007 with several other acts, including the Dresden Dolls, Deborah Harry and Erasure. The tour was for the Human Rights Campaign to promote LGBT rights in the US and beyond. A second True Colors Tour occurred in 2008.

== Track listings ==
- 7-inch single
1. "True Colors" – 3:45
2. "Heading for the Moon" – 3:17
- European 12-inch single
1. "True Colors" – 3:45
2. "Heading for the Moon" – 3:17
3. "Money Changes Everything" (Live) – 6:04

== Personnel ==
- Cyndi Lauper – lead vocals, arrangements, backing vocals
- Peter Wood – keyboards, arrangements
- John McCurry – guitars
- Neil Jason – bass guitar
- Jimmy Bralower – LinnDrum programming, percussion, jam box
- Angela Clemmons-Patrick – backing vocals

== Charts ==
=== Weekly charts ===
Chart (1986–1987)	Peak position
Australia (Kent Music Report)	3
Austria (Ö3 Austria Top 40)	12
Belgium (Ultratop 50 Flanders)	4
Canada Retail Singles (The Record)	1
Canada Top Singles (RPM)	1
Canada Adult Contemporary (RPM)	1
Chile (Chilean Singles Chart)	1
European Hot 100 Singles (Music & Media)	6
Finland (Suomen virallinen lista)	18
France (SNEP)	49
Ireland (IRMA)	6
Italy (Musica e dischi)	12
Luxembourg (Radio Luxembourg)	24
Netherlands (Dutch Top 40)	7
Netherlands (Single Top 100)	14
New Zealand (Recorded Music NZ)	8
Norway (VG-lista)	10
Panama (UPI)	5
Portugal (AFP)	3
South Africa (Springbok)	14
Switzerland (Schweizer Hitparade)	17
UK Singles (Official Charts)	12
US Billboard Hot 100	1
US Adult Contemporary (Billboard)	5
US Cash Box Top 100	1
West Germany (GfK)	18
Zimbabwe (ZIMA)	7

Chart (2008)	Peak position
Norway (VG-lista)	17

Chart (2012)	Peak position
Japan (Hot 100)	61

Chart (2025)	Peak position
Israel International Airplay (Media Forest)	13

=== Year-end charts ===
Chart (1986)	Position
Australia (Kent Music Report)	19
Belgium (Ultratop)	49
Canada Top Singles (RPM)	19
European Hot 100 Singles (Music & Media)	78
Ireland (Single Top 30)	22
Netherlands (Dutch Top 40)	58
Netherlands (Single Top 100)	68
US Billboard Hot 100	41
US Cash Box Top 100	29

== Certifications ==
Region	Certification	Certified units/sales
Canada (Music Canada)	Gold	50,000^{^}
Denmark (IFPI Danmark)	Gold	45,000^{‡}
Italy (FIMI) Since 2009	Gold	50,000^{‡}
New Zealand (RMNZ)	Platinum	30,000^{‡}
Spain (Promusicae)	Gold	30,000^{‡}
United Kingdom (BPI) 2006 release	Gold	400,000^{‡}
United States (RIAA)	Platinum	1,000,000^{‡}
^{^} Shipments figures based on certification alone.^{‡} Sales+streaming figures based on certification alone.

== Release history ==
Release dates and formats for "True Colors"
Region	Date	Format(s)	Label(s)	Cat. No.	Ref.
United States	August 15, 1986	—N/a	Portrait	—N/a	
United Kingdom	September 8, 1986	7-inch	Portrait	650026 7	
United Kingdom	September 15, 1986	12-inch; 7-inch poster sleeve	Portrait	650026 6; 650026 0	

== Phil Collins version ==
"True Colors"

Single by Phil Collins

from the album ...Hits
- B-side: "I Missed Again"; "In the Air Tonight"; "Don't Lose My Number"; "Take Me Home"
- Released: October 5, 1998
- Studio: Brandon's Way (Los Angeles)
- Length: 4:34
- Label: Virgin; Face Value
- Songwriters: Tom Kelly; Billy Steinberg
- Producer: Babyface

Phil Collins singles chronology
"The Same Moon" (1997)	"True Colors" (1998)	"You'll Be in My Heart" (1999)

Music video
- "Phil Collins - True Colors (Official Music Video)" on YouTube

English musician Phil Collins recorded a cover of "True Colors" for his first greatest hits album, ...Hits (1998). It was released on October 5, 1998, in Japan and on October 26 in the United Kingdom. R&B singer Kenneth "Babyface" Edmonds produced this version and provided backing vocals. The track peaked at number 12 on the U.S. Billboard Bubbling Under Hot 100, number two on the Billboard Adult Contemporary chart, and number 26 on the UK Singles Chart. It additionally reached the top 40 in Austria, Canada, France, Germany, and Hungary.

In 2004, a live rehearsal version was released on Collins' Love Songs: A Compilation... Old and New album.

=== Track listings ===
UK CD1 and cassette single

1. "True Colors" – 4:33
2. "I Missed Again" – 3:41
3. "In the Air Tonight" – 7:32

UK CD2

1. "True Colors" – 4:33
2. "Don't Lose My Number" – 4:47
3. "Take Me Home" – 5:51

European CD single

1. "True Colors" – 4:33
2. "In the Air Tonight" – 7:32

Australian CD single

1. "True Colors" – 4:33
2. "In the Air Tonight" – 7:32
3. "Don't Lose My Number" – 4:47
4. "I Missed Again" – 3:41

=== Credits and personnel ===
Credits are adapted from the UK CD1 liner notes.

Studio

- Recorded and mixed at Brandon's Way Recording (Los Angeles)

Personnel

- Tom Kelly – writing
- Billy Steinberg – writing
- Phil Collins – vocals, drums
- Michael Thompson – guitar
- Cornelius Mims – bass
- Greg Phillinganes – acoustic piano, Wurlitzer
- Babyface – backing vocals, keyboards, drum programming, production
- Sheila E. – percussion
- Eric Rigler – Uilleann pipes
- Jon Gass – mixing
- E'lyk – assistant mixing engineer
- Paul Boutin – engineering
- Ivy Skoff – production coordination
- Wherefore ART? – artwork design, illustration
- Trevor Keys – photography

=== Charts ===
==== Weekly charts ====
Chart (1998–2004)	Peak position
Austria (Ö3 Austria Top 40)	20
Belgium (Ultratip Bubbling Under Flanders)	6
Canada Top Singles (RPM)	40
Canada Adult Contemporary (RPM)	3
Estonia (Eesti Top 20)	7
Europe (Eurochart Hot 100)	56
France (SNEP)	33
Germany (GfK)	35
Hungary (Mahasz)	7
Netherlands (Single Top 100)	73
Poland Airplay (Music & Media)	2
Scottish Singles Sales (Official Charts)	35
UK Singles (Official Charts)	26
UK Airplay (Music Week)	47
US Bubbling Under Hot 100 (Billboard)	12
US Adult Contemporary (Billboard)	2

==== Year-end charts ====
Chart (1998)	Position
Canada Adult Contemporary (RPM)	24
US Adult Contemporary (Billboard)	39

Chart (1999)	Position
Canada Adult Contemporary (RPM)	27
US Adult Contemporary (Billboard)	14

=== Release history ===
Region	Date	Format(s)	Label(s)	Ref.
United States	September 22, 1998	Contemporary hit radio	Atlantic; Face Value	
Japan	October 5, 1998	CD	WEA	
United Kingdom	October 26, 1998	CD; cassette	Virgin; Face Value	

== Kasey Chambers version ==
"True Colours"

Single by Kasey Chambers
- B-side: "If I Could" (live); "Lonely"
- Released: April 14, 2003
- Label: EMI Music
- Songwriters: Tom Kelly; Billy Steinberg
- Producer: Nash Chambers

Kasey Chambers singles chronology
"If I Were You" (2002)	"True Colours" (2003)	"Hollywood" (2004)

In 2003, Australian singer-songwriter Kasey Chambers' recording of "True Colors" became the theme song for the 2003 Rugby World Cup. The song peaked at number four, was certified gold by the Australian Recording Industry Association (ARIA), and went on to be the 76th best-selling single in Australia that year. As of 2026, it is Chambers' second-highest-charting single in Australia, after "Not Pretty Enough".

=== Track listing ===
Australian CD single

1. "True Colours"
2. "If I Could" (live)
3. "Lonely"

=== Charts ===
==== Weekly charts ====
Chart (2003)	Peak position
Australia (ARIA)	4

==== Year-end charts ====
Chart (2003)	Position
Australia (ARIA)	76

=== Certifications ===
Region	Certification	Certified units/sales
Australia (ARIA)	Gold	35,000^{^}
^{^} Shipments figures based on certification alone.

== Other versions ==
In 2001, Sarina Paris recorded the song and it was included on her self-titled debut album. Released on May 22, the album was composed of songs co-written by Paris, with the exception of this cover. The album reached number 167 on the Billboard 200 in the U.S.

In 2009, Jenna Ushkowitz performed it on the television program Glee, and this version was included on the compilation album Glee: The Music, Volume 2, released on December 4, 2009. The single charted on the Billboard Hot 100 in the U.S. and reached number 15 in Ireland, number 35 in the United Kingdom, number 38 in Canada and number 47 in Australia.

In 2012, Artists Against Bullying (often styled as "Artists Against"), an agglomeration of seven Canadian musicians, re-recorded the song and released it during Bullying Awareness Week. The project was inspired by the increase in teen bullying and cyberbullying, especially the Amanda Todd case, with proceeds being donated to Kids Help Phone, a Canadian counseling service for children and youth. The artists involved in the recording were Lights, Pierre Bouvier (from Simple Plan), Jacob Hoggard (from Hedley), Fefe Dobson, Kardinal Offishall, Alyssa Reid and Walk Off the Earth. The song entered the Canadian Singles Top 100 chart at number 10 the week it was released.

South Korean girl group Wonder Girls covered the song for MTV Iggy’s 2012 Cover the World campaign.

In 2016, Justin Timberlake and Anna Kendrick covered the song for the DreamWorks Animation movie Trolls. Their version was certified platinum in Brazil, gold in the United Kingdom and platinum in New Zealand.

For BBC Children in Need in 2019, 1,399 children sang the song in unison from nine towns across the UK. The performance on the telethon started in the studio and as all the choirs sang it cut between them giving them about 20-25 seconds on air, all in real time as they sang. The choirs sang from: Elstree at Elstree Studios the studio just outside of London where the main telethon was held, Hartlepool at The Town Hall Theatre, Belfast at W5, Maidstone at Allington Castle, The Wirral at the Lady Lever Art Gallery, Cardiff at The Broadcasting House, Mountsorrel at The Mountsorrel Memorial Centre, Larkhill at St Michael's CE Primary School, Glasgow at BBC Pacific Quay
