= List of songs recorded by Cyndi Lauper =

Songs recorded by Cyndi Lauper
- Released songs: 267

This is an alphabetical listing of songs recorded in studio or live by American singer Cyndi Lauper between 1977 and 2018. Lauper's discography, which includes studio and compilation albums, singles, and video releases, is also available.

== Songs officially released as albums, singles or other media ==
Name of song, lyrics writers/music writers, album and year of release
Song	Lyric writer(s)	Music writer(s)	Album	Year
"911"	Cyndi Lauper; Stephen Broughton Lunt		True Colors	1986
"A Christmas Duel" (with The Hives)	Randy Fitzsimmons		Non-album single	2008
"A Night To Remember"	Cyndi Lauper; Dusty Micale; Franke Previte		A Night to Remember	1989
"A Part Hate"	Cyndi Lauper; Tom Gray; David Thornton		Hat Full of Stars	1993
"Above the Clouds" (featuring Jeff Beck)	Cyndi Lauper; Jeff Beck; Jed Leiber		The Body Acoustic	2005
"Across the Universe" (by Jake Shimabukuro featuring Cyndi Lauper)	John Lennon; Paul McCartney		Across the Universe (Jake Shimabukuro album)	2009
"All Through the Night"	Jules Shear		She's So Unusual	1983
"Anna Blue" (by Blue Angel)	Cyndi Lauper; John Turi		Blue Angel (Blue Angel album)	1980
"Another Brick in the Wall (Part 2)" [Live] (by Roger Waters and the Bleeding Heart Band featuring Cyndi Lauper)	Roger Waters		The Wall – Live in Berlin (Roger Waters album)	1990
"At Last"	Harry Warren; Mack Gordon		At Last	2003
"Ballad of Cleo and Joe"	Cyndi Lauper; Jan Pulsford		Sisters of Avalon	1997
"Baby Workout" [Live]	Alonzo Tucker; Jackie Wilson		Cyndi Lauper in Paris (Video release)	1987
"Begging to You"	Marty Robbins		Detour	2016
"Blue Christmas"	Billy Hayes; Jay W. Johnson		Non-album single	2011
"Boy Blue"	Cyndi Lauper; Jeff Bova; Stephen Broughton Lunt		True Colors	1986
"Boys Will Be Boys" (by The Hooters featuring Cyndi Lauper)	Cyndi Lauper; Eric Bazilian; Rob Hyman		Out of Body (The Hooters album)	1993
"Brimestone and Fire"	Cyndi Lauper; Jan Pulsford		Sisters of Avalon	1997
"Broken Glass"	Cyndi Lauper; Marv DePeyer; Junior Vasquez		Hat Full of Stars	1993
"Calm Inside the Storm"	Cyndi Lauper; Rick Derringer		True Colors	1986
"Can't Blame Me" (by Blue Angel)	Cyndi Lauper; John Turi		Blue Angel (Blue Angel album)	1980
"Can't Breathe"	Cyndi Lauper; Chau Phan; Alexander Kronlund		Bring Ya to the Brink (Japanese Edition)	2008
"Change Of Heart"	Cyndi Lauper; Essra Mohawk		True Colors	1986
"Christmas Conga"	Cyndi Lauper; Jan Pulsford		Merry Christmas ... Have a Nice Life	1998
"Code of Silence" (by Billy Joel featuring Cyndi Lauper as background vocals)	Cyndi Lauper; Billy Joel		The Bridge (Billy Joel album)	1986
"Cold"	Cyndi Lauper; Allee Willis; Daniel Sembello		B-side to "Who Let In the Rain"	1993
"Cold Sky"	Cyndi Lauper; Franke Previte; Alan Roy Scott; Igor Nikolayev		Music Speaks Louder Than Words (Compilation Album)	1990
"Come On Home"	Cyndi Lauper; Jan Pulsford		Twelve Deadly Cyns...and Then Some	1994
"Comfort You"	Cyndi Lauper; Jan Pulsford		Shine (Japanese Edition)	2004
"Crossroads" (featuring Jonny Lang)	Robert Johnson		Memphis Blues	2010
"Dancing With a Stranger"	Cyndi Lauper; Franke Previte; Paul Chiten		A Night to Remember	1989
"Dear John"	Cyndi Lauper; Eric Bazilian; Rob Hyman		Hat Full of Stars	1993
"December Child"	Cyndi Lauper; Jan Pulsford		Merry Christmas ... Have a Nice Life	1998
"Detour" (featuring Emmylou Harris)	Paul Westmoreland		Detour	2016
"Disco Inferno"	Leroy Green; Ron Kersey		Non-album single	1999
"Don't Cry No More"	Don Robey		Memphis Blues	2010
"Don't Let Me Be Misunderstood"	Bennie Benjamin; Gloria Caldwell; Sol Marcus		At Last	2003
"Down Don't Bother Me" (featuring Charlie Musselwhite)	Albert King		Memphis Blues	2010
"Down So Low"	Tracy Nelson		Memphis Blues	2010
"Echo"	Cyndi Lauper; Peer Åström; Johan Bobäck; William Wittman		Bring Ya to the Brink	2008
"Early Christmas Morning"	Cyndi Lauper; Jan Pulsford		Merry Christmas ... Have a Nice Life	1998
"Early in the Mornin'" (featuring Allen Toussaint and B.B. King)	Leo Hickman; Louis Jordan; Dallas Bartley		Memphis Blues	2010
"Eventually"	Cyndi Lauper; Ryuichi Sakamoto		Shine (Japanese Edition	2004
"Everybody's Got an Angel" (by Blue Angel)	Cyndi Lauper; Lee Brovitz; John Morelli; Arthur "Rockin' A" Neilson; John Turi; Henry Gross		Blue Angel (Blue Angel album)	1980
"Fade" (by Blue Angel)	Cyndi Lauper; John Turi		Blue Angel (Blue Angel album)	1980
"Fall Into Your Dreams"	Cyndi Lauper; Jan Pulsford		Sisters of Avalon	1997
"Feels Like Christmas"	Cyndi Lauper; Eric Bazilian; Rob Hyman		Hat Full of Stars	1993
"Fearless"	Cyndi Lauper		Sisters of Avalon	1997
"Funnel of Love"	Charlie McCoy; Kent Westbury		Detour	2016
"Girls Just Want to Have Fun"	Robert Hazard		She's So Unusual	1983
"The Goonies 'R' Good Enough"	Cyndi Lauper; Stephen Broughton Lunt; Arthur Stead		The Goonies: Original Motion Picture Soundtrack	1985
"Got Candy"	Cyndi Lauper; Richard Morel		Bring Ya to the Brink (Japanese Edition)	2008
"Grab a Hold"	Cyndi Lauper; Dan Kurtz; Martina Sorbara		Bring Ya to the Brink	2008
"Give It Up"	Cyndi Lauper; Steve Cornish; Nicholas Mace		Bring Ya to the Brink	2008
"Hard Candy Christmas"	Carol Hall		Detour	2016
"Hat Full of Stars"	Cyndi Lauper; Nicky Holland		Hat Full of Stars	1993
"He's So Unusual"	Al Sherman; Al Lewis; Abner Silver		She's So Unusual	1983
"Heading for the Moon"	Cyndi Lauper; Stephen Broughton Lunt; Arthur Stead		B-side to "True Colors"True Colors (35th Anniversary Edition)	1986 2021
"Heading West"	Cyndi Lauper; Tom Kelly; Billy Steinberg		A Night to Remember	1989
"Heartaches by the Number"	Harlan Howard		Detour	2016
"Hey Now (Girls Just Want to Have Fun)"	Lolly Vegas; Robert Hazard		Twelve Deadly Cyns...and Then Some	1994
"High and Mighty"	Cyndi Lauper; Jesse Houk		Bring Ya to the Brink	2008
"Higher Plane"	Cyndi Lauper; Jan Pulsford		Shine (Japanese Edition)	2004
"Hole in My Heart (All the Way to China)"	Richard Orange		Non-album single	1988
"Home on Christmas Day"	Cyndi Lauper; Rob Hyman; William Wittman		Merry Christmas ... Have a Nice Life	1998
"Hot Gets a Little Cold"	Cyndi Lauper; Catherine Russel		Sisters of Avalon	1997
"How Blue Can You Get?" (featuring Jonny Lang)	Jane Feather		Memphis Blues	2010
"Hymn to Love"	Eddie Constantine (Original French lyrics by Edith Piaf)	Marguerite Monnot	At Last	2003
"I Drove All Night"	Tom Kelly; Billy Steinberg		A Night to Remember	1989
"I Don't Want to Be Your Friend"	Diane Warren		A Night to Remember	1989
"I Don't Want to Cry" (featuring Leo Gandelman or TOKU)	Chuck Jackson		Memphis Blues (Latin American and Japanese Editions)	2010
"I Fall to Pieces"	Hank Cochran; Harlan Howard		Detour	2016
"I Had a Love" (by Blue Angel)	Cyndi Lauper; John Turi		Blue Angel (Blue Angel album)	1980
"I Miss My Baby"	Cyndi Lauper; Jan Pulsford		Shine (Japanese Edition)	2004
"I Want a Mom That Will Last Forever"	Cyndi Lauper; Mark Mothersbaugh		Music from Rugrats in Paris: The Movie	2000
"I Want to Be a Cowboy's Sweetheart"	Patsy Montana		Detour	2016
"I'll Be Your River" (featuring Vivian Green)	Cyndi Lauper; Tom Hammer		The Body Acoustic	2005
"I'll Kiss You"	Cyndi Lauper; Jules Shear		She's So Unusual	1983
"I'm Gonna Be Strong" (by Blue Angel and Solo)	Barry Mann; Cynthia Weil		Blue Angel; Twelve Deadly Cyns...and Then Some	1980; 1994
"If by Chance" (by Wild Colonials featuring Cyndi Lauper)	Paul Cantelon; Thaddeus Corea; Angela McCluskey; Scott Roewe		Reel Life, Vol. 1 (Wild Colonials album)	2000
"If You Go Away"	Rod McKuen (Original French lyrics by Jacques Brel)	Jacques Brel	At Last	2003
"Iko Iko"	Rosa Lee Hawkins; Barbara Anne Hawkins; Joan Marie Johnson; Sharon Jones; Marilyn Jones; Boogaloo Joe Jones; Jesse Thomas		True Colors	1986
"In the Bleak Midwinter"	Christina Rossetti	Gustav Holst	Merry Christmas ... Have a Nice Life	1998
"Insecurious"	Cyndi Lauper; Diane Warren; Desmond Child		A Night to Remember	1989
"Into the Nightlife"	Cyndi Lauper; Peer Åström; Johan Bobäck; Max Martin		Bring Ya to the Brink	2008
"It's Hard to Be Me"	Cyndi Lauper; Rob Hyman; William Wittman		Shine	2002
"Just the Other Day" (by Blue Angel)	Cyndi Lauper; John Turi		Blue Angel (Blue Angel album)	1980
"Just Your Fool" (featuring Charlie Musselwhite)	Marion Walter Jacobs		Memphis Blues	2010
"Kindred Spirit"	Cyndi Lauper		A Night to Remember	1989
"La Vie en Rose"	Mack David (Original French lyrics by Edith Piaf)	Louiguy; Marguerite Monnot	At Last	2003
"Lay Me Down"	Cyndi Lauper; Andreas Kleerup		Bring Ya to the Brink	2008
"Lies"	Cyndi Lauper; Allee Willis		Hat Full of Stars	1993
"Like a Cat"	Christina Amphlett; Tom Kelly; Billy Steinberg		A Night to Remember	1989
"Like I Used To"	Cyndi Lauper; Allee Willis		Hat Full of Stars	1993
"Lorraine" (by Blue Angel)	Cyndi Lauper; John Turi		Blue Angel (Blue Angel album)	1980
"Love to Hate"	Cyndi Lauper; Jan Pulsford		Sisters of Avalon	1997
"Lyfe"	Cyndi Lauper; Roger Fife; Melissa Greene; Sammy Merendino		Bring Ya to the Brink	2008
"Madonna Whore"	Cyndi Lauper; William Wittman		Shine	2002
"Makin' Whoopee" (with Tony Bennett)	Gus Kahn	Walter Donaldson	At Last	2003
"Maybe He'll Know" (by Blue Angel and Solo)	Cyndi Lauper; John Turi		Blue Angel; True Colors	1980; 1994
"Minnie and Santa"	Cyndi Lauper; Jan Pulsford		Merry Christmas ... Have a Nice Life	1998
"Misty Blue"	Bob Montgomery		Detour	2016
"Mother"	Cyndi Lauper; Jan Pulsford		Sisters of Avalon	1997
"Money Changes Everything"	Tom Gray		She's So Unusual	1983
"My Baby Just Cares for Me"	Gus Kahn	Walter Donaldson	At Last	2003
"My First Night Without You"	Cyndi Lauper; Tom Kelly; Billy Steinberg		A Night to Remember	1989
"New Year's Baby (First Lullaby)"	Cyndi Lauper		Merry Christmas ... Have a Nice Life	1998
"Night Life" (featuring Willie Nelson)	Walt Breeland; Paul Buskirk; Willie Nelson		Detour	2016
"On the Sunny Side of the Street"	Dorothy Fields	Jimmy McHugh	At Last	2003
"One Track Mind"	Cyndi Lauper; Jeff Bova; Jimmy Bralowe; Lennie Petze		True Colors	1986
"Primitive"	Cyndi Lauper; Tom Kelly; Billy Steinberg		A Night to Remember	1989
"Prisoner of Love"	Leo Robin	Russ Columbo; Clarence Gaskill	Romance & Cigaretts (Film)	2005
"Product of Misery"	Cyndi Lauper; Eric Bazilian; Rob Hyman		Hat Full of Stars	1993
"Rain on Me"	Cyndi Lauper; Chau Phan; Axel Hedfors; Alexander Kronlund		Bring Ya to the Brink	2008
"Raging Storm"	Cyndi Lauper; Richard Morel		Bring Ya to the Brink	2008
"Rather Be with You"	Cyndi Lauper; Doc Fleming; Marcello Nines		Shine (Japanese Edition)	2004
"Right Track, Wrong Train"	Cyndi Lauper; Ellie Greenwich; Jeff Kent		B-side to "Girls Just Want to Have Fun"She's So Unusual: A 30th Anniversary Celebration	1983 2014
"Rockin' Around the Christmas Tree"	Johnny Marks		Merry Christmas ... Have a Nice Life	1998
"Rocking Chair"	Cyndi Lauper; Felix Buxton; Simon Ratcliffe		Bring Ya to the Brink	2008
"Rollin' and Tumblin'"	Muddy Waters		Memphis Blues	2010
"Romance in the Dark"	William Lee Conley Broonzy Lillian Green		Memphis Blues	2010
"Rules and Regulations'' (1983 Rehearsal)	Jules Shear	Rick Chertoff	She's So Unusual: A 30th Anniversary Celebration	2014
"Sally's Pigeons"	Cyndi Lauper; Mary Chapin Carpenter		Hat Full of Stars	1993
"Same Ol' Story"	Cyndi Lauper; Richard Morel		Bring Ya to the Brink	2008
"Santa Claus Is Coming to Town" (with Frank Sinatra)	John Frederick Coots; Haven Gillespie		A Very Special Christmas 2 (Various artists)	1992
"Say a Prayer"	Cyndi Lauper; Jan Pulsford		Sisters of Avalon	1997
"Searching"	Cyndi Lauper; Jan Pulsford		Sisters of Avalon	1997
"Set Your Heart"	Cyndi Lauper; Victor Carstarphen; Gene McFadden; Richard Morel; John Whitehead		Bring Ya to the Brink	2008
"Sex Is in the Heel"	Cyndi Lauper		Non-album single	2012
"Shattered Dreams" (featuring Allen Toussaint)	Lowell Fulson; Washington Ferdinand		Memphis Blues	2010
"She Bop"	Cyndi Lauper; Rick Chertoff; Gary Corbett; Stephen Broughton Lunt		She's So Unusual	1983
"Shine"	Cyndi Lauper; William Wittman		Shine	2002
"Silent Night"	Franz Gruber; Josef Mohr		Merry Christmas ... Have a Nice Life	1998
"Sisters of Avalon"	Cyndi Lauper; Jan Pulsford		Sisters of Avalon	1997
"Someone Like Me"	Cyndi Lauper; Eric Bazilian; Rob Hyman; Allee Willis		Hat Full of Stars	1993
"Stay"	Maurice Williams		At Last	2003
"Steady" (by Jules Shear featuring Cyndi Lauper as background vocals)	Cyndi Lauper; Jules Shear		The Eternal Return (Jules Shear album)	1985
"Take a Chance" (by Blue Angel)	Cyndi Lauper; John Turi		Blue Angel (Blue Angel album)	1980
"That's What I Think"	Cyndi Lauper; Eric Bazilian; Rob Hyman; Allee Willis		Hat Full of Stars	1993
"The Faraway Nearby"	Cyndi Lauper; Tom Gray		True Colors	1986
"The World Is Stone"	Tim Rice (Original French lyrics by Luc Plamondon)	Michel Berger	Tycoon (Various artists)	1992
"The River Cried''	Tom Kelly Billy Steinberg	Cyndi Lauper Lennie Petze Brian McGee Fred Kevorkian	True Colors (40th Anniversary Expanded Edition)	2026
"Time After Time"	Cyndi Lauper; Rob Hyman		She's So Unusual	1983
"True Colors"	Tom Kelly; Billy Steinberg		True Colors	1986
"Unabbreviated Love"	Cyndi Lauper; Dusty Micale; Franke Previte		B-side to "My First Night Without You"	1989
"Unchained Melody"	Hy Zaret	Alex North	At Last	2003
"Unconditional Love"	Cyndi Lauper; Tom Kelly; Billy Steinberg		A Night to Remember	1989
"Unhook the Stars"	Cyndi Lauper; Jan Pulsford		Sisters of Avalon	1997
"Valentino"	Cyndi Lauper; Jan Pulsford		Shine (Japanese Edition)	2004
"Walk On By"	Hal David	Burt Bacharach	At Last	2003
"Walkin' After Midnight"	Alan Block; Donn Hecht		Detour	2016
"Water's Edge"	Cyndi Lauper; Rob Hyman		Shine	2002
"We Are the World" (by USA for Africa)	Michael Jackson; Lionel Richie		We Are the World (USA for Africa album)	1985
"What a Thrill"	Cyndi Lauper; John Turi		The Goonies: Original Motion Picture Soundtrack	1985
"What's Going On"	Renaldo Benson; Al Cleveland; Marvin Gaye		True Colors	1986
"When You Were Mine"	Prince		She's So Unusual	1983
"Who Let In the Rain"	Cyndi Lauper; Allee Willis		Hat Full of Stars; Shine (Japanese Edition)	1993; 2004
"Wide Open"	Cyndi Lauper; Jan Pulsford		Shine (Japanese Edition)	2004
"Witness"	Cyndi Lauper; John Turi		She's So Unusual	1983
"Yeah Yeah"	Hasse Huss; Mikael Rickfors		She's So Unusual	1983
"You Don't Know"	Cyndi Lauper; Jan Pulsford		Sisters of Avalon	1997
"You Have to Learn to Live Alone"	Tim Rice (Original French lyrics by Luc Plamondon)	Michel Berger	Tycoon (Various artists)	1992
"You Make Loving Fun"	Christine McVie		Non-album single	1984
"You're the Reason Our Kids are Ugly" (featuring Vince Gill)	Lola Jean Dillon; L. E. White		Detour	2016
"You've Really Got a Hold on Me"	Smokey Robinson		At Last	2003

== A ==
- "After the Twilight"
- "Allons A Grand Coteau" *
- "America The Beautiful"
- "Auld Lang Syne"

== B ==
- "Bee Charmer"
- "Big Black Hole" *
- "Blood From A Stone" *
- "Blue Moon"
- "Blue Savannah"
- "Box Of Rain"

== C ==
- "Callin' (You) (Me)" *
- "Carey"
- "Chicken Man" *
- "Cut Out"
- "Cyrus in the Moonlight"

== D ==
- "Destiny" *
- "Do The Twist (Twister Sisters)" *
- "Don't Know"
- "Don't Look Back" *
- "Don't Make It A Mistake"

== E ==
- "Early Bird"
- "Edge Of The Earth"
- "Eleven Days"
- "Endless Moment" *

== F ==
- "Falling In Love Again"
- "Festival Zydeco"
- "Five Days"
- "Flyer"

== G ==
- "Gay Messiah"
- "Giniro-no Yume"
- "Give Peace A Chance"
- "Go On" *
- "God Help Me...I Love Rock-n-Roll"
- "Girls Just Wanna Set Your Heart"
- "God Only Knows"
- "Goodbye To You"
- "Girls Just Want To Have Fun"

== H ==
- "Hang On Sloopy"
- "He's A Rebel"
- "Heart And Soul (Here & There Rough)"
- "Helpless"
- "Hey Bulldog"
- "Hound Dog"
- "Hungry For You" *

== I ==
- "I'm From New York"
- "I Am Leaving" *
- "I Can't Stand The Rain"
- "I Fall Down" *
- "I Pity The Fool"
- "I'll Kiss You"
- "I Shall Be Released"
- "If I Could Turn Back Time"
- "If You Go Away"
- "Imagine"
- "Immigrant Song"
- "In My Life"
- "It's A Beautiful Thing" *
- "It's Not Like You"

== J ==
- "Jano" *
- "Jim Jive"
- "Just Like Before" *

== L ==
- "Lactose Intolerant"
- "Lady Grinning Soul"
- "Lady Marmalade"
- "Late"
- "Lipstick On Your Collar"
- "Little Drummer Boy"
- "Lollygaging"
- "Love Me All Over"
- "Lovers Never Part" *

== M ==
- "Magazine Cover"
- "Mary" *
- "Mary's Boy Child"
- "Maybe I'm Amazed"
- "Message To Michael"
- "Midnight Radio"
- "Mincing Words"
- "Moments Like This"
- "Mother Earth"

== N ==
- "Never Was A Woman" *
- "New Attitude"
- "No One's Home"

== O ==
- "O-o-h Child"
- "Other Side Of Here" *

== P ==
- "Pee Wee's Playhouse Theme" (as Ellen Shaw)
- "Put On Your Green Shoes"

== R ==
- "River Deep – Mountain High"
- "Rock And Roll"
- "Rock and Roll, Hoochie Koo"
- "Rock Your Blues Away" *
- "Roll Over Beethoven"

== S ==
- "Shining Star"
- "Shooting Star"
- "Signals"
- "Slumdog Millionaire"
- "Still With Me"
- "Strawberry Fields Forever"

== T ==
- "Taffy Butt" – A lyrical rewrite of "The Goonies 'R' Good Enough"; end credits theme for the Bob's Burgers episode "The Belchies" (aired 3/11/12)
- "Take A Chance On Me"
- "Take Me Out To The Ballgame"
- "The End of the World"
- "The More I See You"
- "The Only Fish In My Sea"
- "The Other Side of Here"
- "The Star-Spangled Banner"
- "The Tide Is Turning"
- "The Times They Are A-Changin' "
- "There's No Business Like Show Business"
- "These Boots Are Made For Walking"
- "This Kind Of Love"
- "Three Ships"
- "Turn Me Around" *
- "Twilight Eyes"

== U ==
- "Under The Scarlet Sky"
- "Until You Come Back To Me"

== W ==
- "Walk Away Renee"
- "What Can You Do For Me?
- "White Man's Melody"
- "Why Don't You Say You Love Me?" *
- "Wild Women Don't Have the Blues"
- "Winter Lovers"
- "Winter Wonderland"
- "Working Class Hero"

== Y ==
- "Your Sweet Lovin' "

== Z ==
- "Zero Landmine"

* denotes songs from soundtracks and other multi-artist recordings
