= True Colors: The Best of Cyndi Lauper =

Compilation album by Cyndi Lauper
- Released: June 12, 2009
- Recorded: 1983–1996
- Genre: Pop; dance-pop; soft rock; new wave
- Length: 139:03
- Label: Sony Camden
- Producer: Various

Cyndi Lauper chronology
Bring Ya to the Brink (2008)	True Colors: The Best of Cyndi Lauper (2009)	Memphis Blues (2010)

True Colors: The Best of Cyndi Lauper is a 2009 compilation album by Cyndi Lauper, released exclusively in Australia, New Zealand and Europe as part of Sony Camden, a budget range of compilations by Sony Music.

The set features two discs, both with 18 songs, spanning from the start of Lauper's career (1983's She's So Unusual) through to 1996's Sisters of Avalon. All studio albums through the period are represented, and placed alongside most of the singles from this time are several album tracks. The songs are not placed in chronological order. All of the tracks from A Night to Remember (except "Intro", "A Night to Remember" and "Insecurious") appear on the set. In fact (excluding the latter two of the absent songs), tracks 6 through 13 on the second disc of this compilation are an exact replication of the track order on A Night to Remember. The cover of the album was first used as the artwork for Lauper's cover of Marvin Gaye's "What's Going On".

Sony Camden also released another Cyndi Lauper compilation in Australia in 2009; the single-disc Time After Time: The Best of Cyndi Lauper, variants of which had been released earlier worldwide.

== Track listing ==
True Colors: The Best of Cyndi Lauper – CD 1
No.	Title	Writer(s)	Length
1.	"Girls Just Want to Have Fun"	Robert Hazard	3:56
2.	"Time After Time"	Cyndi Lauper; Rob Hyman	4:02
3.	"True Colors"	Tom Kelly; Billy Steinberg	3:49
4.	"I Drove All Night"	Kelly; Steinberg	4:12
5.	"She Bop"	Lauper; Stephen Broughton Lunt; Gary Corbett; Rick Chertoff	3:49
6.	"Iko Iko"	James Crawford; Barbara Hawkins; Rosa Hawkins; Joan Johnson	2:10
7.	"When You Were Mine"	Prince	5:03
8.	"Change of Heart"	Lauper; Essra Mohawk	4:25
9.	"All Through the Night"	Jules Shear	4:30
10.	"What's Going On"	Al Cleveland; Renaldo Benson; Marvin Gaye	3:51
11.	"The World Is Stone"	Michel Berger; Luc Plamondon; Tim Rice	4:18
12.	"Maybe He'll Know"	John Turi; Lauper	4:26
13.	"Hat Full of Stars"	Lauper; Nicky Holland	4:29
14.	"Who Let in the Rain"	Lauper; Allee Willis	4:37
15.	"Money Changes Everything"	Tom Gray	5:03
16.	"Sisters of Avalon"	Lauper; Jan Pulsford	4:21
17.	"Unhook the Stars"	Lauper; Pulsford	3:58
18.	"The Goonies 'R' Good Enough"	Lauper; Lunt; Arthur Stead	3:40
Total length:			74:39

True Colors: The Best of Cyndi Lauper – CD 2
No.	Title	Writer(s)	Length
1.	"Calm Inside the Storm"	Rick Derringer; Lauper	3:58
2.	"Lies"	Lauper; Willis	3:41
3.	"Boy Blue"	Jeff Bova; Lunt; Lauper	4:48
4.	"Someone like Me"	Lauper; Eric Bazilian; Hyman; Willis	4:06
5.	"The Faraway Nearby"	Gray; Lauper	3:02
6.	"Primitive"	Lauper; Kelly; Steinberg	3:50
7.	"My First Night Without You"	Lauper; Kelly; Steinberg	3:03
8.	"Like a Cat"	Christine Amphlett; Kelly; Steinberg	3:25
9.	"Heading West"	Lauper; Kelly; Steinberg	3:56
10.	"Unconditional Love"	Lauper; Kelly; Steinberg	3:57
11.	"Dancing with a Stranger"	Lauper; Franke Previte; Paul Chiten	4:13
12.	"I Don't Want to Be Your Friend"	Diane Warren	4:23
13.	"Kindred Spirit"	Lauper	1:19
14.	"Hole in My Heart (All the Way to China)"	Richard Orange	4:00
15.	"That's What I Think"	Lauper; Hyman; Willis; Bazilian	4:19
16.	"Sally's Pigeons"	Lauper; Mary Chapin Carpenter	3:50
17.	"Dear John"	Lauper; Bazilian; Hyman	3:42
18.	"You Don't Know"	Lauper; Pulsford	5:15
Total length:			64:24 (139:03)

== Charts ==
Chart (2009–2011)	Peak position
Australian Albums (ARIA)	146

== Certifications and sales ==
Region	Certification	Certified units/sales
United Kingdom (BPI)	Gold	100,000^{‡}
^{‡} Sales+streaming figures based on certification alone.
