= True Colors =

True Colors or True Colours may refer to:

== Music ==
=== Cyndi Lauper ===
- True Colors (Cyndi Lauper album), 1986
- "True Colors" (Cyndi Lauper song), the title track
- True Colors (concert tour), an annual music event created by her
- True Colors: The Best of Cyndi Lauper, 2009

=== Zedd ===
- True Colors (Zedd album), 2015
- "True Colors" (Zedd song), 2015
- True Colors Tour, a concert tour by him

=== Other artists ===
- True Colors, 2019 EP by Alba
- True Colors (EP), 2019 EP by Yunho

==== Albums ====
- True Colours (High Contrast album), 2002 album
- True Colours (Level 42 album), 1984
- True Colours (Split Enz album), 1980 album
- True Colours, a 2005 album by Smujji
- True Colors: The Best of Sonic the Hedgehog Part 2, a compilation album of songs from the Sonic the Hedgehog franchise

==== Songs ====
- "True Colours" (Go West song), 1986
- "True Colours", by Becky Hill from Believe Me Now?
- "True Colours", by Studio Killers from Studio Killers
- "True Colors", by The Weeknd from Starboy
- "True Colors", by Wage War from Manic

== Film and television ==
=== Film ===
- True Colors (film), a 1991 film directed by Herbert Ross

=== TV series ===
- True Colors (American TV series), a 1990–92 American television series
- True Colours (Australian TV series), a 2022 Australian television series

=== TV episodes ===
- "True Colors" (The Adventures of Super Mario Bros. 3), 1990
- "True Colors" (Amphibia), 2021
- "True Colours" (Degrassi: The Next Generation), 2006
- "True Colors" (The Flash), 2018
- "True Colors" (Grey's Anatomy), 2017
- "True Colours" (Merseybeat), 2003
- "True Colors" (Scorpion), 2014
- "True Colors" (That's So Raven), 2005

== Fiction ==
- Star Wars Republic Commando: True Colors, the third novel in the Republic Commando series
- TrueColors, a series of novels by Melody Carlson
- True Colours, a 2013 crime novel by Stephen Leather

== Other uses ==
- True Colors (personality), the psychometric personality test
- Life Is Strange: True Colors, video game in the Life Is Strange series

== See also ==
- True color (disambiguation)
