= I Fall Down =

I Fall Down may refer to:

- "I Fall Down", song by Cyndi Lauper (see List of songs recorded by Cyndi Lauper)
- "I Fall Down", 1997 song by John Davis (singer-songwriter) from 30 Amp Fuse
- "I Fall Down", 2012 song by Sahaj from Another Minute
- "I Fall Down" (U2 song), 1981 song by U2
- I Fall Down, 2013 dramatic horror film written and directed by Christopher White
