= She's So Unusual =

Studio album by Cyndi Lauper
- Released: October 14, 1983
- Recorded: May – August 1983
- Studio: Record Plant (New York City)
- Genres: New wave; synth-pop; pop rock; art pop
- Length: 38:42
- Label: Portrait
- Producer: Rick Chertoff

Cyndi Lauper chronology
She's So Unusual (1983)	True Colors (1986)

Singles from She's So Unusual
- 1. "Girls Just Want to Have Fun" Released: October 17, 1983; 2. "Time After Time" Released: March 12, 1984; 3. "She Bop" Released: July 2, 1984; 4. "All Through the Night" Released: September 3, 1984; 5. "Money Changes Everything" Released: December 22, 1984; 6. "When You Were Mine" Released: January 31, 1985 (Can/Jpn)

She's So Unusual is the debut solo album by American pop singer Cyndi Lauper, released on October 14, 1983, by Portrait Records. The album was re-released in 2014 to commemorate its 30th anniversary, and was called She's So Unusual: A 30th Anniversary Celebration. The re-release contains demos and remixes of previously released material, as well as new artwork.

In 1978, Lauper formed the band Blue Angel. The band soon signed a recording contract with Polydor Records; however, their debut album, Blue Angel, was a commercial failure. The band parted ways after firing their manager, who sued Lauper for $80,000 and forced her into bankruptcy. Lauper went on to sing in many New York night clubs, and caught the eye of David Wolff, who became her manager and subsequently got her signed to Portrait Records.

Six singles were released from the album, with "Girls Just Want to Have Fun" becoming a worldwide hit and her first song to chart on the Billboard Hot 100. "Time After Time" became her first number-one hit on the chart and experienced similar success worldwide. Lauper found success with the next two singles as well, with both "She Bop" and "All Through the Night" peaking in the top five. This makes Lauper the first female singer to have four top five singles on the Hot 100 from one album. She's So Unusual was promoted by the Fun Tour throughout 1983 and 1984.

The album is primarily new wave–based, with many of the songs being influenced by synth-pop and pop rock. Upon its release, the album received positive reviews from music critics, who noted Lauper's unique vocals. Lauper earned several awards and accolades for the album, including two Grammy Awards at the 27th Annual Grammy Awards, one of which was for Best New Artist. She's So Unusual peaked at number four on the Billboard 200 chart and stayed in the chart's top forty for 65 weeks. It has sold over 7 million copies in the United States and 16 million copies worldwide. This makes it Lauper's best-selling album and one of the best-selling albums of the 1980s. In 2003, She's So Unusual was ranked at number 494 on Rolling Stone's list of the 500 greatest albums of all time, and it subsequently placed at number 184 in a 2020 reboot of the list. In 2019, the album was selected by the Library of Congress for preservation in the United States National Recording Registry for being "culturally, historically, or aesthetically significant".

== Background ==
In 1978, Lauper met saxophonist John Turi and formed the band Blue Angel. They recorded a demo tape of original music. Steve Massarsky heard the tape and liked Lauper's voice. He bought out Blue Angel's contract for $5,000 and became their manager.

Lauper received many offers to go solo, but rebuffed any offer that did not include the rest of the band. Blue Angel was eventually signed by Polydor Records through which they released the album Blue Angel in 1980. Despite some positive critical attention, the album was a commercial failure. The members of Blue Angel also had a falling-out with Massarsky and fired him as their manager. He later filed an $80,000 suit against them, which forced Lauper into bankruptcy.

After Blue Angel broke up, Lauper spent time working in retail stores and singing in local clubs. In 1981, while singing in a local New York bar, Lauper met David Wolff, who took over as her manager. With his help, Lauper signed with Portrait Records, a subsidiary of Epic Records, in the spring of 1983 and soon began recording her first solo album.

== Artwork ==
The front cover of She's So Unusual was photographed on Henderson Walk in Coney Island, New York in the summer of 1983 by Annie Leibovitz. Lauper is depicted wearing a vintage red prom-style dress that she purchased at the vintage clothing shop where she used to work, Screaming Mimi's. She is also seen holding a bouquet of flowers which were purchased from a vendor on the boardwalk at the time of the shoot. Lauper has heavy costume jewelry on her ears, arms, neck and right ankle. She is barefoot, with the exception of the fishnet stockings, and her red high-heels appear to have been taken off in front of her as they lie on their sides at the bottom of the photo. The cover shot was captured in front of the wax museum, The World in Wax Musee. It can be seen behind Lauper that the museum had been closed for some time and at the time of closure was featuring a wax statue of Puerto Rican professional baseball player Roberto Clemente. The wooden awning above the doorway with the two blue panels read the name of the museum. The first panel read "The World" and second panel read "In Wax". This was airbrushed out of the photograph.

The cover won Janet Perr the Grammy Award for Best Recording Package in 1985.

== Singles ==
The lead single from the album was "Girls Just Want to Have Fun", released on October 17, 1983. The single achieved massive success in the United States with its music video playing in heavy rotation on several stations, and eventually peaking at number two on the Billboard Hot 100. It received Platinum certification from the Recording Industry Association of America (RIAA) for sales of 2,000,000 copies. The single was a success internationally, reaching the top ten in 19 countries and number one in 10 countries, including Australia, Canada, Ireland, Japan, New Zealand, Brazil and Norway. "Girls Just Want to Have Fun" received nominations at the 1985 Grammy Awards for Record of the Year and Best Female Pop Vocal Performance, and won Best Female Video at the 1984 MTV Video Music Awards, among several nominations. In the year end Top 100 of 1984 in New Zealand, the single was included on the top spots.

"Time After Time" was the second single released from the album, and was released in March 1984. It repeated the success of the previous single and spent two consecutive weeks at number one on the Billboard Hot 100, becoming Lauper's first number one hit on the Hot 100 and eventually spending a total of 20 weeks on the chart and receiving Gold certification from the RIAA for 1,000,000 copies sold. Like the previous single, "Time After Time" was an international success and reached the top ten in 15 countries. The song received a Grammy nomination for Song of the Year. In the year end Top 100 of 1984 in New Zealand, the single was included on the top spots.

The third single from the album was "She Bop", released on July 2, 1984. The song reached number three on the Hot 100, becoming her third consecutive top five hit, and spent a total of 18 weeks on the chart. With sales of over 1,000,000 copies, the song was certified Gold by the RIAA. The single proved to be another international success for Lauper, reaching the top ten in 8 countries. "She Bop" was controversial upon release and placed at number 15 on the PMRC's "Filthy Fifteen".

"All Through the Night" was single number four, released in September 1984. Like Lauper's previous three singles, "All Through the Night" reached the top five of the Hot 100 with a peak of number five which solidified Lauper as the first female artist to have four top five hits on the Billboard Hot 100. It was written by, and originally recorded by Jules Shear, who provided backing vocals as well. The song was a moderate international success, reaching the top ten in 6 countries, and received Gold certification in Canada. In the year end Top 100 of 1985 in New Zealand, the single was included on the list.

Single number five was "Money Changes Everything", released in December 1984. It was released earlier as 7" in the U.K. in May 1984, but the new single rerelease was issued February 11, 1985. It was a moderate success and reached number 27 on the Hot 100, Lauper's first single to not reach the top ten. It also did moderately well in Australia, reaching number 19 on its chart.

The sixth and final single from the album was a cover of the Prince song, "When You Were Mine", released on January 31, 1985, in Canada and Japan only. It achieved little success, reaching number 62 on the Canadian Singles Chart.

== Critical reception ==
Professional ratings
Review scores
Source	Rating
AllMusic	3.5/5 stars
Christgau's Record Guide	A
Classic Pop	4.5/5 stars
Los Angeles Times	4/4 stars
Pitchfork	8.0/10
Record Collector	4/5 stars
Rolling Stone	3.5/5 stars
The Rolling Stone Album Guide	4/5 stars
Slant Magazine	4.5/5 stars
Spin Alternative Record Guide	9/10

In a contemporary review for Rolling Stone, Kurt Loder highlighted Lauper's "wild and wonderful skyrocket of a voice", which he felt recalled the "long-gone golden age" of "pre-Beatles girl-group pop", and lauded She's So Unusual as a progression from her work in Blue Angel: "Here, boosted by a powerful, synth-based band, Lauper turns away from nouveau trash and trains her talent on some really first-rate material." Robert Christgau gave qualified praise in The Village Voice, complimenting Lauper for covering "two of the sharpest pop songs of the past five years" in "Money Changes Everything" and "When You Were Mine", while finding her "Betty Boop voice" less effective over a full album; however, he would later pen a glowing reappraisal of the record, conceding that "if a kook who's loved, respected, and taken seriously by her sisters fools boys into believing she can be fooled with, more power to her." She's So Unusual was voted the eleventh-best album of the year in The Village Voice's annual Pazz & Jop critics' poll for 1984.

Billboard magazine named the album one of its "Top Album Picks" for the week of October 29, 1983. Lauper was described as "fevered cross between Lene Lovich and Chrissie Hynde" and the album as "a splashy debut squarely aimed at the post-punk market". Billboard predicted a "successful career launch" with the "strong array" of songs on the album and Lauper's "impassioned vocal attack".

Retrospectively, AllMusic critic Stephen Thomas Erlewine deemed She's So Unusual "one of the great new wave/early MTV records" and "a giddy mix of self-confidence, effervescent popcraft, unabashed sentimentality, subversiveness, and clever humor", concluding that "if Lauper couldn't maintain this level of consistency, it's because this captured her persona better than anyone could imagine". Slant Magazine's Sal Cinquemani called it "a pop classic" with a "rare balance of camp and candor that set Lauper apart from her contemporaries and continues to retain her place in the pop pantheon." In Classic Pop, John Earls praised the album as a testament to Lauper's "will, exuberance and vocal control" and versatility "across synth-pop, rock and power ballads", while Terry Staunton wrote in Record Collector that Lauper's "cartoon-like kooky personality was underpinned by a formidable songwriting talent." Arielle Gordon of Pitchfork said that with She's So Unusual, "Lauper shoehorned rebellion into the familiar, both musically and visually", helping to "usher in an electronic era for popular rock" and envisioning "a world where women danced through New York in ruffle skirts and combat boots, partied with a sense of purpose, and were just as powerful at their most vulnerable as their most ferocious."

Select rankings of She's So Unusual
Publication	List (1984)	Rank	Ref.
The Village Voice	Pazz & Jop 1984: Dean's List	11	

== Commercial performance ==
The album has sold over 16 million copies worldwide.

=== North America ===
==== United States ====
She's So Unusual debuted on the Billboard 200 chart in the week dated December 24, 1983 at number 193. The album reached the Top 10 by the end of March 1984 in its 15th week on the chart. It achieved a peak position of number 4 on the chart dated June 2, 1984, after having stayed on the Billboard 200 for 24 weeks up to that point. Overall, the album stayed 97 weeks on the Billboard 200. It became one of the best-selling albums of 1984. She's So Unusual has since sold over seven million copies in the United States, where it was certified seven times platinum by the RIAA.

The album debuted on the Billboard Top Rock Albums in the week dated December 17, 1983.

==== Canada ====
She's So Unusual was the second-best-selling album in Canada by a female artist during the decade, behind Whitney Houston's 1985 album Whitney Houston, selling more than 900,000 copies.

=== Asia ===
In Japan, the album debuted at number 14 on the albums chart in the week dated March 26, 1984. It reached its peak position of number 5 just over a month later in the week dated April 30, 1984.

=== Oceania ===
She's So Unusual entered the Australian albums chart in the week dated May 28, 1984 at number 12. It went to peak in the top three of the albums chart.

== Accolades ==
She's So Unusual and its singles earned Lauper six Grammy Award nominations, including Album of the Year and ultimately winning the awards for Best Recording Package and Best New Artist. "Girls Just Want to Have Fun" was nominated for Record of the Year and Best Female Pop Vocal Performance, and "Time After Time" was nominated for Song of the Year. Lauper earned ten MTV Video Music Award nominations. "Girls Just Want to Have Fun" received six nominations including Video of the Year, and won for Best Female Video. "Time After Time" received three nominations and "She Bop" received one nomination.

She's So Unusual was ranked at number 494 on Rolling Stone's list of the 500 greatest albums of all time in 2003, rising to number 487 in a 2012 update of the list, then to number 184 in a 2020 update. Rolling Stone also placed She's So Unusual at number 41 on its 2002 list of 50 essential albums by women in rock, and the record retained the placement on a similar list published by the magazine a decade later. In 2012, Slant Magazine listed it as the 22nd best album of the 1980s, calling it an "absolutely peerless collection of profound pop jewels". Slant also included it on their 2003 list of 50 Essential Pop Albums. In 2019, the Library of Congress selected She's So Unusual for preservation in the National Recording Registry for being "culturally, historically, or aesthetically significant".

Year	Nominee / work	Award	Result
1984	"Girls Just Want to Have Fun"	MTV Video Music Award for Video of the Year	Nominated
1984	"Girls Just Want to Have Fun"	MTV Video Music Award for Best New Artist	Nominated
1984	"Girls Just Want to Have Fun"	MTV Video Music Award for Best Female Video	Won
1984	"Girls Just Want to Have Fun"	MTV Video Music Award for Best Concept Video	Nominated
1984	"Girls Just Want to Have Fun"	MTV Video Music Award – Viewer's Choice	Nominated
1984	"Girls Just Want to Have Fun"	MTV Video Music Award for Best Overall Performance	Nominated
1984	"Time After Time"	MTV Video Music Award for Best New Artist	Nominated
1984	"Time After Time"	MTV Video Music Award for Best Female Video	Nominated
1984	"Time After Time"	MTV Video Music Award for Best Direction	Nominated
1985	Cyndi Lauper	Grammy Award for Best New Artist	Won
1985	She's So Unusual	Grammy Award for Best Album Package	Won
1985	She's So Unusual	Grammy Award for Album of the Year	Nominated
1985	"Girls Just Want To Have Fun"	Grammy Award for Record of the Year	Nominated
1985	"Girls Just Want To Have Fun"	Grammy Award for Best Female Pop Vocal Performance	Nominated
1985	"Time After Time"	Grammy Award for Song of the Year	Nominated
1985	"She Bop"	MTV Video Music Award for Best Female Video	Nominated

== 30th anniversary tour ==
The 30th anniversary of She's So Unusual occurred in 2013. To honor it and to thank her fans for its success, Lauper embarked on She's So Unusual: 30th Anniversary Tour, a world tour.

As part of the show, Lauper sang the entire track listing of the record in the order it appears on the CD while telling stories about the production of the record and her life at the time she recorded it.

== Track listing ==
=== Original release ===
Side one
No.	Title	Writer(s)	Publisher	Length
1.	"Money Changes Everything"	Tom Gray	Gray Matter Music/ATV Music Corp.	5:06
2.	"Girls Just Want to Have Fun"	Robert Hazard	Heroic Music	3:58
3.	"When You Were Mine"	Prince	Ecnirp Music	5:06
4.	"Time After Time"	Cyndi Lauper; Rob Hyman	Dub Notes, Rella Music	4:01
Total length:				18:11

Side two
No.	Title	Writer(s)	Publisher	Length
1.	"She Bop"	Lauper; Rick Chertoff; Gary Corbett; Stephen Broughton Lunt	Rellla Music Co., Noyb Music Co., Wall to Wall Music Co. & Hobbler Music	3:47
2.	"All Through the Night"	Jules Shear	Funzalo Music/Juters Music Co.	4:33
3.	"Witness"	Lauper; John Turi	Turalaura Music and Turi Music	3:40
4.	"I'll Kiss You"	Lauper; Shear	Rellla Music Co., Funzalo Music / Juters Music Co.	4:12
5.	"He's So Unusual"	Al Sherman; Al Lewis; Abner Silver	Shapiro, Bernstein & Co. Inc	0:45
6.	"Yeah Yeah"	Hasse Huss; Mikael Rickfors	Stainless Music Corp.	3:18
Total length:				20:15

2000 reissue
No.	Title	Notes	Length
11.	"Money Changes Everything" (Live)	Recorded 1984, Irvine Meadows Amphitheatre, Irvine, California; previously unreleased edit (original recording from Portrait promotional 12-inch (AS 1961)	4:36
12.	"She Bop" (Live)	Recorded 1984, Irvine Meadows Amphitheatre, Irvine, California; previously unreleased	5:20
13.	"All Through the Night" (Live)	Recorded 1984, Irvine Meadows Amphitheatre, Irvine, California; previously unreleased	4:48
14.	"Money Changes Everything" (Live at Summer Sonic 07) (Japan remaster exclusive bonus track)		5:10
Total length:			58:36

Notes

- "Irvine Meadows" live tracks recorded on the Fun Tour at Irvine Meadows Amphitheatre, Irvine, California, U.S. (September 22, 1984).
- "Summer Sonic 07" live track recorded at Japan Summer Sonic Festival, either Osaka (August 11, 2007) or Tokyo (August 12, 2007).
- Tracks 11 to 13 are bonus tracks on the 2000 remastered version (and after)
- Tracks 11 to 14 are bonus tracks on the 2008 Japan remastered Mini-LP version (and 2013 re-issue of same).
- In 2013, the 2008 Japan remaster was reissued on BSCD2 format with the same 2008 track listing.

30th anniversary reissue (2014)
No.	Title	Length
11.	"Girls Just Want to Have Fun (2013 Yolanda Be Cool remix)"	5:52
12.	"Time After Time (2013 NERVO Back in Time remix)"	4:53
13.	"Time After Time (2013 Bent Collective remix)"	7:15
Total length:		56:42

=== 30th anniversary reissue (2014) ===
Bonus disc
No.	Title	Length
1.	"Girls Just Want to Have Fun" (1983 early guitar demo)	3:32
2.	"All Through the Night" (1983 rehearsal with studio dialog)	5:30
3.	"Rules and Regulations" (1983 rehearsal)	2:41
4.	"Money Changes Everything" (demo)	4:52
5.	"Girls Just Want to Have Fun" (demo)	3:22
6.	"Right Track, Wrong Train" (non LP B-side)	4:40
7.	"Witness" (live, Boston, 1984)	3:12
8.	"She Bop" (1984 Arthur Baker remix)	6:27
9.	"Time After Time" (work in progress rough mix)	4:00
Total length:		38:16

Note

- "The Goonies 'R' Good Enough" is featured as a bonus track on disc one of the deluxe edition in Japan.

== Personnel ==
Musicians

- Cyndi Lauper – lead vocals; backing vocals; arrangements
- Rob Hyman – keyboards; backing vocals; arrangements (1, 2, 4–10)
- Richard Termini – synthesizers
- Peter Wood – synthesizers
- Eric Bazilian – arrangements (1, 2, 4–10); melodica; guitars; bass; saxophone (10); backing vocals
- Rick DiFonzo – guitars
- Neil Jason – guitars; bass
- William Wittman – guitars; arrangements (3)
- Anton Fig – drums; drum machines; percussion
- Rick Chertoff – percussion; arrangements
- Krystal Davis – backing vocals
- Ellie Greenwich – backing vocals
- Jules Shear – backing vocals
- Maeretha Stewart – backing vocals
- Diane Wilson – backing vocals

Production

- Rick Chertoff – producer
- William Wittman – associate producer; engineer
- Lennie Petze – executive producer
- John Jansen – additional engineer
- Rod O'Brien – additional engineer
- John Agnello – assistant engineer
- Dan Beck – product manager
- Amy Linden – liner notes
- Janet Perr – art direction; design; cover art concept
- Cyndi Lauper – cover art concept
- Ralph Scibelli – hair design
- Justin Ware – hair design
- Laura Wells – stylist
- Annie Leibovitz – photography
- David Wolff – management
- Joseph Zynczak – management

Reissue Credits

- Bruce Dickinson – producer
- Cyndi Lauper – producer (live tracks)
- Lennie Petze – producer (live tracks)
- Steve Berkowitz – A&R direction
- Patti Matheny – A&R coordinator
- Darren Salmieri – A&R coordinator
- George Marino – mastering at Sterling Sound (New York, NY).
- John Jackson – project director
- John Christiana – packaging manager
- Howard Fritzson – art direction
- Janet Perr – design

== Charts ==
=== Weekly charts ===
Weekly chart performance for She's So Unusual
Chart (1984–1985)	Peak position
Australian Albums (Kent Music Report)	3
Austrian Albums (Ö3 Austria)	5
Canada Top Albums/CDs (RPM)	1
Canadian Albums (The Record)	1
Dutch Albums (Album Top 100)	19
European Albums (Eurotipsheet)	16
Finnish Albums (Suomen virallinen lista)	22
German Albums (Offizielle Top 100)	23
Italian Albums (Musica e dischi)	14
Japanese Albums (Music Labo)	5
New Zealand Albums (RMNZ)	3
Norwegian Albums (VG-lista)	4
South African Albums (RISA)	6
Swedish Albums (Sverigetopplistan)	22
Swiss Albums (Schweizer Hitparade)	8
UK Albums (Official Charts)	16
US Billboard 200	4
Zimbabwean Albums (ZIMA)	1

Chart (2025)	Peak position
Greek Albums (IFPI)	61

=== Year-end charts ===
1984 year-end chart performance for She's So Unusual
Chart (1984)	Position
Australian Albums (Kent Music Report)	24
Canada Top Albums/CDs (RPM)	5
Dutch Albums (Album Top 100)	68
German Albums (Offizielle Top 100)	75
Japanese Albums (Oricon)	25
New Zealand Albums (RMNZ)	33
Norwegian Russefeiring Period Albums (VG-lista)	11
Swiss Albums (Schweizer Hitparade)	16
UK Albums (Gallup)	70
US Billboard 200	11

1985 year-end chart performance for She's So Unusual
Chart (1985)	Position
Australian Albums (Kent Music Report)	8
Austrian Albums (Ö3 Austria)	19
Canada Top Albums/CDs (RPM)	24
New Zealand Albums (RMNZ)	17
US Billboard 200	28

=== Decade-end charts ===
Decade-end chart performance for She's So Unusual
Chart (1980–1989)	Position
Australian Albums (Kent Music Report)	27

== Certifications and sales ==
Certifications and sales for She's So Unusual
Region	Certification	Certified units/sales
Australia (ARIA)	Platinum	70,000^{^}
Brazil (Pro-Música Brasil)	2× Platinum	500,000^{‡}
Canada (Music Canada)	8× Platinum	900,000
France (SNEP)	Gold	100,000^{*}
Germany (BVMI)	Gold	250,000^{^}
Hong Kong (IFPI Hong Kong)	Gold	10,000^{*}
Italy (FIMI)	Gold	25,000^{‡}
Japan (RIAJ)	Gold	372,000
New Zealand (RMNZ)	Platinum	15,000^{^}
Switzerland (IFPI Switzerland)	Platinum	50,000^{^}
United Kingdom (BPI)	Gold	100,000^{^}
United States (RIAA)	7× Platinum	7,000,000^{‡}
Summaries
Worldwide	—	16,000,000
^{*} Sales figures based on certification alone.^{^} Shipments figures based on certification alone.^{‡} Sales+streaming figures based on certification alone.

== Release history ==
Region(s)	Date	Label(s)	Format(s)	Ref.
Original release
United States	October 13, 1983	Portrait	LP; Cassette	
United Kingdom	January 30, 1984	Portrait; Epic	LP; Cassette	
United States	June 1984	Portrait	CD	
United Kingdom	August 12, 1985	Portrait	CD	
United Kingdom	March 20, 1989	CBS	LP; Cassette; CD	
Remastered editions
Japan	February 21, 2001	Sony Music	CD	
Japan	June 18, 2008	Sony Music	CD (LP replica sleeve)	
Japan	March 25, 2009	Sony Music	Blu-Spec CD	
United States and Europe	March 30, 2014	Portrait; Epic; Legacy	LP; CD; 2CD	
Japan	April 9, 2014	Sony Music	2CD+DVD	
