= Vibes (film) =

1988 film by Ken Kwapis

- Theatrical release poster
- Directed by: Ken Kwapis
- Written by: Lowell Ganz; Babaloo Mandel
- Story by: Deborah Blum; Lowell Ganz; Babaloo Mandel
- Produced by: Deborah Blum; Tony Ganz
- Starring: Cyndi Lauper; Jeff Goldblum; Julian Sands; Googy Gress; Peter Falk
- Cinematography: John Bailey
- Edited by: Carol Littleton
- Music by: James Horner
- Production company: Imagine Entertainment
- Distributed by: Columbia Pictures
- Release date: August 5, 1988 (U.S.)
- Running time: 99 minutes
- Country: United States
- Language: English
- Budget: $18 million
- Box office: $1,883,811

Vibes is a 1988 American romantic fantasy adventure comedy film directed by Ken Kwapis and starring Cyndi Lauper, Jeff Goldblum, Julian Sands and Peter Falk. The plot concerns Sylvia, an eccentric psychic, and Nick, her equally odd psychic friend and their trip into the Ecuadorian Andes to find the "source of psychic energy".

== Plot ==
Sylvia Pickel (pronounced with an emphasis on the "kel") is a trance-medium who has contact with Louise, a wisecracking spirit guide. She first began communicating with her after falling from a ladder at the age of 12 and remaining comatose for two weeks. Subsequently, Louise taught her astral projection while she was placed in special homes for being "different."

At a study of psychics, Sylvia meets fellow psychic Nick Deezy, a psychometrist who can determine the history of events surrounding an object by touching it. Sylvia has a history of bad luck with men, and her overly flirtatious behavior turns him off right away.

Sylvia comes home to her apartment one night to find Harry Buscafusco lounging in her kitchen. He wants to hire her for $50,000 if she'll accompany him to Ecuador where his son has allegedly gone missing. Sylvia recruits Nick who is reluctant but also eager to leave his job as a museum curator where his special talents are abused like a circus act.

Once the two get there, they initially set out to where Harry's son was last seen, only to have Nick's powers tell them that Harry is up to something. Harry confesses that what he is actually looking for is a lost city of gold up in the mountains and that his last partner, who discovered it, went insane. Nick angrily retreats back to the hotel followed by Sylvia who feels embarrassed over being fooled by yet another man.

At the hotel Nick is attacked by a woman who tries to drug and then stab him, saying "You think you can just come here and take it away from us?" Convinced that there is something important, if dangerous, at work he agrees to trek back into the mountains to search for this lost city.

The group makes a detour to visit Harry's former partner, who is in a vegetative state in the hospital. When Nick lays hands on him he receives a jolt of tremendous psychic energy; the former partner immediately dies.

Unexpectedly, the three are set upon by Ingo Swedlin, another psychic from their test group. He holds them at gunpoint and threatens to kill them, but Sylvia uses Louise to get in touch with his long-lost mother and the group escapes. They begin their journey anew only to once again be confronted by Ingo and by Doctor Harrison Steele. Ingo throws a knife into Harry's back and kills him, and the other two are taken hostage. They are forced to lead the way to this alleged city of gold.

Upon arriving, the group discovers an ancient pyramid-shaped structure with mystical carvings. Sylvia translates them and they appear to reveal that the location was built by an ancient alien race who has embedded all of the psychic energy of the world into this pyramid. Nick touches the pyramid and discovers the ancient Incan civilization here was destroyed by using the pyramid's power on each other. Using the translation Sylvia provided, Ingo attempts to decipher the secret to harnessing the energy, but before he can, Sylvia lays hands on the pyramid and allows the dangerous forces to flow through her. She kills their captors and is nearly killed herself, but survives. However, she permanently loses contact with her spirit guide Louise, who sacrifices herself to save her and Nick in the process.

The two return to their hotel, battered and bruised but thankful that they played a part in releasing a dangerous force. Later that night they reconvene in Sylvia's room and bring to fruition a romantic flirtation that has permeated the film. Before they can make love, however, Sylvia hits her head on the headboard and reveals that a spirit guide has re-entered her life. It is not Louise, however, but Harry.

== Cast ==
- Cyndi Lauper as Sylvia Pickel
- Jeff Goldblum as Nick Deezy
- Julian Sands as Dr. Harrison Steele
- Googy Gress as Ingo Swedlin
- Peter Falk as Harry Buscafusco
- Ronald G. Joseph as Carl
- Ramon Bieri as Eli Diamond
- Michael Lerner as Burt Wilder
- Elizabeth Peña as Consuelo
- Rodney Kageyama as Dr. Harmon
- Van Dyke Parks as Dr. Weiner
- Joseph V. Perry as Dave
- Park Overall as Jane
- Max Perlich as Busboy
- John Kapelos as Eugene
- Bruce MacVittie as Tony
- Don Bexley as Lou
- Bill McCutcheon as Mr. Van Der Meer
- Steve Buscemi as Fred
- Jennifer Balgobin as Gloria

== Production ==
The movie was described as "Romancing the Ghostbusters in the Temple of Doom." It was originally meant to star Lauper and Dan Aykroyd.

Lauper said, "I've wanted to do a movie for a long time, but I didn't want to do a typical airhead version of what Hollywood thinks a woman is-and I didn't want to do an ultra-serious La Femme! film either. The character I play in this film, Sylvia, is the kind of girl who's very conscious of her appearance and always wants to look good, but unfortunately her favorite color is leopard skin. She's definitely kooky, but she's different from my pop persona."

Aykroyd met with Lauper and decided he did not want to do the film. Columbia Pictures stood by Lauper and Jeff Goldblum replaced Aykroyd. Filming started in April 1987 in Ecuador. After three weeks, the unit transferred to Los Angeles for the rest of the shoot over nine weeks.

"Acting and performing music come from the same place, but each requires a slightly different technique," said Lauper. "To play Sylvia, I had to learn to tone everything down. I'm used to things being exaggerated and larger than life-you know, the eyes going back and forth-because those things work in a big concert hall. To perform for a movie camera, you have to be capable of a certain stillness. That's something I've learned here that I enjoy very much."

== Reception ==
Vibes was panned by critics. On Rotten Tomatoes, it has an approval rating of 13% based on 23 reviews.

Roger Ebert gave the film 1 out of 4 stars and wrote: "Movies like Vibes appear and disappear like fireflies in the dog days of summer. Nobody seems to have made them, nobody sees them, nobody remembers them." Washington Post film critic Rita Kempley's negative reaction to the film caused her to question Ron Howard's judgement for involving himself with the production, writing "Ron Howard must have been in a trance when he agreed to back the project."

=== Box office ===
Vibes bombed at the box office, bringing in $1.7 million against a $18 million budget.

== Soundtrack ==
The original motion picture soundtrack album includes music scored for the film by James Horner. The soundtrack does not contain the song "Hole in My Heart (All the Way to China)" by Cyndi Lauper and written by Richard Orange.

== Home media ==
On February 3, 2009, Vibes received a DVD release through Sony Pictures' Martini Movies line.

On February 26, 2014, Vibes received a new DVD release through Mill Creek Entertainment under license by Sony.

On February 11, 2020, the film was released to Blu-ray for the first time by Mill Creek Entertainment.
