= True color =

True color may refer to:

- True color (rendering), the rendition of an object's natural colors through an image
- 24-bit color, the use of 24 bits to store color information
- True color, a scale used to determine the color of water after all suspended material has been filtered out

== See also ==
- True Colors (disambiguation)
