= The Brains (album) =

Studio album by The Brains
- Released: 1980
- Recorded: 1980
- Studio: Web IV Studios
- Genre: Pop, rock
- Label: Mercury
- Producer: Steve Lillywhite

The Brains chronology
The Brains (1980)	Electronic Eden (1981)

The Brains is the debut album by The Brains. It was released in 1980 and contains the original recording of "Money Changes Everything", which, when released three years later, became a substantial hit single for pop singer Cyndi Lauper.

== Critical reception ==
At the time of issuance the album made a great impression on Billboard critics. In the review of May 3, 1980, they wrote: "This is a truly offbeat album which mixes '60s organ dominated psychedelia, new wave, heavy metal and world savvy lyrics into an intoxicating brew. Tom Gray's passionate vocals have enough aural sprawl and power to make the lyrics credible."

== Track listing ==
- All songs written by Tom Gray except where noted.
1. "Treason" (Rick Price) 2:33
2. "See Me" 4:57
3. "Raeline" 1:52
4. "Girl I Wanna" 3:42
5. "In the Night" (Alfredo Villar) 5:23
6. "Money Changes Everything" 3:29
7. "Scared Kid" 3:10
8. "Sweethearts" (Villar) 3:49
9. "Girl in a Magazine" 3:08
10. "Gold Dust Kids" 4:16

== Personnel ==
=== The Brains ===
- Tom Gray: Vocals, Keyboards, Synthesizers
- Rick Price: Acoustic and Electric Guitars
- Bryan Smithwick: Bass
- Charles Wolff: Drums, Percussion, Vocals

=== Additional Personnel ===
- Debbie Thompson, Sue Wilkinson, Anne Boston, Joann Elsey, Joe Roman, Mark Richardson: Backing Vocals on "Sweethearts"

== Production ==
- Arranged by The Brains
- Produced and Mastered by Steve Lillywhite
- Recorded and Mixed by Steve Lillywhite and Mark Richardson
- All songs published by ATV Music/Gray Matter Music.
