= Hole in My Heart (All the Way to China) =

Single by Cyndi Lauper

from the album Vibes and A Night to Remember
- B-side: "Boy Blue" (Live at Le Zénith)
- Released: June 22, 1988
- Recorded: 1988
- Studio: The Hit Factory (New York, NY)
- Genre: Pop rock; new wave
- Length: 3:59; 5:20 (video version)
- Label: Epic
- Songwriter: Richard Orange
- Producers: Cyndi Lauper; Lennie Petze

Cyndi Lauper singles chronology
"Maybe He'll Know" (1987)	"Hole in My Heart (All the Way to China)" (1988)	"I Drove All Night" (1989)

Music video
- "Hole in My Heart" on YouTube

"Hole in My Heart (All the Way to China)" is a song recorded by American singer and songwriter Cyndi Lauper for her 1988 film Vibes. It was written by Richard Orange, formerly of the band Zuider Zee. The track first saw the light of day on an official CD as a bonus track for the Japanese releases of A Night to Remember and Twelve Deadly Cyns...and Then Some. It can also be found on the following albums: The Great Cyndi Lauper (3 CDs), Best Movie Album in the World...Ever! (3 CDs), True Colors: The Best of Cyndi Lauper (2 CDs), 36 All-time Favorites (3 CDs), Monster Hits 1988/Hits of 1988 and Cyndi Lauper Japanese Singles Collection Greatest Hits (audio track on CD and music video on DVD).

== Song information ==
During a live concert and Q&A appearance in Las Vegas, Cyndi stated her record company thought the song was too fast for radio. Lauper seldom performed this in concert. As part of the "A Night To Remember" tour, it was included in the set list of the Santiago de Chile show in November 1989.

In 2004, during the Australian leg of her "At Last" tour, she performed part of the song a cappella at the request of the audience, since the single reached the Top 10 there in 1988 and was very well known. However, it wasn't until the 2006 Body Acoustic Tour that she played the song regularly in full again, and she frequently opened the True Colors 2007 Tour with it. The song was also the opening track of her 2008 Australian Tour.

== Composition ==
It was written by Richard Orange. The song length is 4 minutes and 2 seconds. It was written in the key of E major with 168 beats per minute. Orange later recorded his own version of the song, under the title "All The Way To China (Hole In My Heart)", on the 2005 album Big Orange Sun.

== Critical reception ==
Pan-European magazine Music & Media wrote, "Nervous, up-tempo pop song with an incredibly speedy, Westworld-like R&R feel. Try to dance to it." In the same issue the song was named one of its "singles of the week".

Cash Box called it "an instant classic," saying that Lauper "delivers an emotional, yet energy-up vocal that works."

== Track listings ==
- U.S. 7-inch single – 34 07940
  U.S. cassette single – 34T 07940
  Japan cassette single – 05・6P-3024
  Japan Mini-CD single – 10・8P-3024
1. "Hole in My Heart (All the Way to China)" — 3:57
2. "Boy Blue" (Live at Le Zénith) — 5:36
- Europe and Australia 12-inch single – EPC 652813 6
  Australia cassette single – 652813 4
1. "Hole in My Heart (All the Way to China)" — 3:57
2. "Maybe He'll Know" (Remix) — 3:42
3. "Boy Blue" (Live at Le Zénith) — 5:36
- U.K. 12-inch single – XPR 1364 / CYN QT3
1. "Hole in My Heart (All the Way to China)" — 3:57
2. "Boy Blue" (Live at Le Zénith) — 5:36
3. "What's Going On" (Shep Pettibone Club Mix) — 6:27
- Europe CD single – EPC 652813 3
1. "Hole in My Heart (All the Way to China)" — 3:57
2. "Boy Blue" (Live at Le Zénith) — 5:36
3. "Maybe He'll Know" (Remix) — 3:42
- Netherlands CD single – CYNC3 / 652813 9
1. "Hole in My Heart (All the Way to China)" — 3:57
2. "Boy Blue" (Live at Le Zénith) — 5:36
3. "Girls Just Want to Have Fun" – 3:55
4. "What's Going On" (Shep Pettibone Club Mix) — 6:27
- U.K. CD single – CD CYN 3
1. "Hole in My Heart (All the Way to China)" — 3:57
2. "Boy Blue" (Live at Le Zénith) — 5:36
3. "Time After Time" – 3:59
4. "What's Going On" (Shep Pettibone Club Mix) — 6:27

Notes

"Maybe He'll Know" remix by Phil Thornalley and "What's Going On" club mix by Shep Pettibone.

== Credits ==
- Producer – Cyndi Lauper
- Co-producer – Lennie Petze
- Remix producer – Shep Pettibone
- Remix producer – Phil Thornalley
- Mixed By – Gary Lyons
- Photography By – Annie Leibovitz

== Charts ==
=== Weekly charts ===
Chart (1988)	Peak position
Australia (ARIA)	8
Canada (Canadian Singles Chart)	86
Chile (Chilean Singles Chart)	21
Finland (Suomen virallinen lista)	10
Italy (Italian Singles Chart)	40
New Zealand (RIANZ)	8
Switzerland (Schweizer Hitparade)	13
US Billboard Hot 100	54
US Cash Box Top 100	51

=== Year-end charts ===
Chart (1988)	Position
Australia (ARIA)	89
Peru (HIT PARADE)	27

== Release history ==
Release dates and formats for "Hole in My Heart (All the Way to China)"
Region	Date	Label(s)	Format(s)	Cat. No.	Ref.
United Kingdom	July 25, 1988	Portrait	7-inch	CYN 3	
United Kingdom	August 8, 1988	Portrait	12-inch (Note: Originally planned for release on the same day as the 7-inch single, but pushed back by a week.)	CYN QT3	
United Kingdom	August 15, 1988	Portrait	CD (Limited Edition)	CYN C3	
