= Electronic Eden =

Studio album by The Brains
- Released: 1981
- Recorded: 1981
- Studio: Axis Sound Studio
- Genre: Pop, rock
- Label: Mercury
- Producer: Steve Lillywhite

The Brains chronology
The Brains (1980)	Electronic Eden (1981)	Dancing Under Streetlights (1982)

Professional ratings
Review scores
Source	Rating
AllMusic	2.5/5 stars
Robert Christgau	B
The Rolling Stone Album Guide	2/5 stars

Electronic Eden is the second album by the Brains. It was released in 1981 through Mercury Records. It was the band's last studio album.

== Production ==
Like the debut album, Electronic Eden was produced by Steve Lillywhite and engineered by Mark Richardson.

== Critical reception ==
Robert Christgau thought that "despite its dull initial impact every track will give up a hook." Trouser Press wrote: "Lillywhite concocts a thick, heavy sound that subjugates [Tom] Gray’s synthesizers and Rick Price’s aggressive guitars to the tunes themselves. And for good reason: Gray’s songs are tart accounts of love and confusion perfectly suited to his dry, sardonic voice." The New York Times wrote that "the lyrics delineate urban landscapes and some strangely disturbing situations - a man whose friend has been traumatized by an accident, a couple who are in love but keep getting on each other's nerves - vividly and economically."

== Track listing ==
- All songs written by Tom Gray, except where noted.

Side one

1. "Dream Life" 3:48
2. "One In A Million" 3:19
3. "Hypnotized" 3:39
4. "No Tears Tonight" 2:32
5. "Eyes Of Ice" 3:23

Side two

1. "Asphalt Wonderland" 2:59
2. "Little Girl Gone" 3:44
3. "Ambush" (Rick Price) 3:25
4. "Heart In The Street" 4:00
5. "House Of Cards" 3:10
6. "Collision" 2:35
