= I'm Gonna Be Strong =

1963 single by Barry Mann and Cynthia Weil

"I'm Gonna Be Strong" is a song written by the songwriting duo Barry Mann and Cynthia Weil. It was first recorded by Frankie Laine in 1963 and released as a single on Columbia Records. However, the song did not become a major hit until 1964, when Gene Pitney released his version as a single. It was also a single released by the 1980 band Blue Angel, with lead vocals provided by future star Cyndi Lauper. This release was prior to Lauper's solo career; however, Lauper re-recorded the track and released it as a single in 1994. The song was also featured on 1982's Quiet Lies album by Grammy winner Juice Newton. Though Newton never released the song as a single, her remake was later added as a bonus track to her first Greatest Hits collection.

== Gene Pitney version ==
"I'm Gonna Be Strong"

Single by Gene Pitney

from the album It Hurts to Be in Love and Eleven More Hit Songs
- B-side: "E Se Domani (If Tomorrow)"
- Released: 1964
- Recorded: 1964
- Genre: Pop
- Length: 2:16
- Label: Musicor
- Songwriters: Barry Mann, Cynthia Weil

Gene Pitney singles chronology
"It Hurts to Be in Love" (1964)	"I'm Gonna Be Strong" (1964)	"I Must Be Seeing Things" (1965)

This version was a top ten hit on both the Billboard Hot 100 and the UK Singles Chart. The song is Pitney's biggest UK solo hit, with only his duet version of "Something's Gotten Hold of My Heart" with Marc Almond peaking higher.

=== Charts ===
Country	Peak position
New Zealand (Lever Hit Parade)	3
UK Singles (OCC)	2
US Billboard Hot 100	9

== Blue Angel version ==
"I'm Gonna Be Strong"

Single by Blue Angel

from the album Blue Angel
- B-side: "Just the Other Day"; "Maybe He'll Know"; "Anna Blue"
- Released: June 12, 1980
- Genre: Pop
- Length: 2:50
- Label: Polydor
- Songwriters: Barry Mann; Cynthia Weil
- Producer: Roy Halee

Blue Angel singles chronology
"You Make Loving Fun" (1977)	"I'm Gonna Be Strong" (1980)	"I Had a Love" (1980)

It was also the most successful single released by the 1980 band Blue Angel from their only album, also called Blue Angel (1980). The vocals were provided by American singer-songwriter Cyndi Lauper. The only country where the single charted within the top 100 was the Netherlands, where it reached #37 on the charts. It also reached #140 in the UK in 1984 when reissued and credited to Blue Angel featuring Cyndi Lauper.

The artwork and track listing for the single varied depending on the country of origin. An Italian promotional 7" vinyl single with the same catalogue number and track listing as the German version was released with alternate artwork. The original 1980 Dutch release was re-released with identical packaging in 1984 after Lauper's solo success.

=== Reception ===
Tony Jasper reviewed the 1984 re-release for the UK publication Music Week, noting that Cyndi Lauper "[displayed] considerable vocal range" and that it was "markedly different" from her single "Girls Just Want to Have Fun".

=== Track listing ===
- 7" vinyl (Netherlands)
1. "I'm Gonna Be Strong" – 2:50
2. "Just the Other Day" – 2:42
- 7" vinyl (Germany)/Italian promo 7" vinyl
1. "I'm Gonna Be Strong" – 2:50
2. "Maybe He'll Know" – 3:54
- 7" vinyl (Australia and UK)
1. "I'm Gonna Be Strong" – 2:50
2. "Anna Blue" – 3:57

== Cyndi Lauper version ==
"I'm Gonna Be Strong"

Single by Cyndi Lauper

from the album Twelve Deadly Cyns...and Then Some
- B-side: "Broken Glass"; "Dear John"; "A Part Hate"; "Product of Misery"
- Released: January 30, 1995 (UK)
- Genre: Pop
- Label: Epic
- Songwriters: Barry Mann; Cynthia Weil
- Producers: Cyndi Lauper; William Wittman

Cyndi Lauper singles chronology
"Hey Now (Girls Just Want to Have Fun)" (1994)	"I'm Gonna Be Strong" (1995)	"Come On Home" (1995)

Music video
- "I'm Gonna Be Strong" on YouTube

Lauper re-recorded the track as a solo artist for her first greatest hits album, Twelve Deadly Cyns...and Then Some (1994). It was released as a single in the United Kingdom in January 1995 by Epic. It peaked at number 37 on the UK Singles chart. The single was not commercially released in the US. The accompanying music video was directed by Lauper with Lazslo Kovacs and filmed in New York.

=== Critical reception ===
David Bauder from Associated Press praised the song "among her strongest vocal performances". A reviewer from Cox News Service stated that Lauper "still owns one of the most wide-ranging and dynamic voices in pop music." Ian Tasker from The Guardian wrote that the singer's voice is "arguably best displayed" on the single, describing it as "a highly emotional song of a relationship breaking down, it's unusual in as much as it doesn't really have a chorus – it just builds and builds, adding layer upon layer of pain and hurt as Lauper's majestic voice grows stronger and more insistent, higher and higher until it reaches a heartbreaking climax."

In his weekly UK chart commentary, James Masterton said, "This new single turns down the tempo and lets Cyndi's voice come to the fore with another of the overwrought ballads she is so fond of." Paul Mathur from Melody Maker viewed it as "a paean to self confidence that doesn't even seem to want to get nearer than the foothills of the blinding, snow-capped Everest that was 'Time After Time'." A reviewer from Music Week deemed it "a dramatic ballad [that] bears Lauper's trademark roar but doesn't perhaps have the hit quality of her more successful work. Gerald Martinez from New Straits Times called it a "broadway style ballad", stating that "she's got a unique voice — too high pitched — with a vast range of dynamics, from a whisper to operatic crescendos. Just listen to her final note".

=== Music video ===
The music video for "I'm Gonna Be Strong" was directed by Lauper herself with Lazslo Kovacs for Daisy Force Pictures and filmed in New York. Beth LaMure executive produced the shoot. It features a lonely Lauper walking around in an old house. She wears a red dress and her hair is curly and strong-yellow, almost orange. In the beginning, the singer stands by a wooden table, making a cup of tea while she sings. The windows are covered with blonde curtains. Other scenes show her glancing out of one window, sitting on a bed or looking at herself in a mirror. The video was later made available on Lauper's official YouTube channel in 2009, and had generated more than 2.8 million views as of late 2025.

=== Track listings ===
- Europe 2-track CD single
1. "I'm Gonna Be Strong" – 3:46
2. "A Part Hate" – 4:54
- Europe CD maxi-single / Australian CD single
1. "I'm Gonna Be Strong" – 3:46
2. "Broken Glass" – 3:52
3. "Dear John" – 3:40
4. "A Part Hate" – 4:54
- UK CD1
1. "I'm Gonna Be Strong" – 3:46
2. "Broken Glass" – 5:31
3. "Dear John" – 3:37
- UK CD2
1. "I'm Gonna Be Strong" – 3:46
2. "A Part Hate" – 4:53
3. "Product of Misery" – 4:08
- Japan CD single
1. "I'm Gonna Be Strong" – 3:50
2. "Sally's Pigeons" – 3:46
3. "Feels Like Christmas" – 4:36

=== Charts ===
Chart (1995)	Peak position
Australia (ARIA)	201
Scotland (OCC)	35
UK Singles (OCC)	37
UK Airplay (ERA)	82

=== Release history ===
Release history
Region	Date	Label	Format	Ref.
United Kingdom	January 30, 1995	Epic	Cassette; CD	

== Other notable versions ==
Dutch singer Glennis Grace covered the song in 1994, peaking at 13 on the Dutch Top 40.
