= At Last (Cyndi Lauper album) =

Studio album by Cyndi Lauper
- Released: November 18, 2003
- Recorded: 2003
- Studios: Livewire Recording, Avatar Studios, Bennett Studios, Right Track Studios, Clinton Recording Studios
- Genre: Jazz
- Length: 50:02
- Labels: Epic; Daylight
- Producers: Cyndi Lauper; Russ Titelman

Cyndi Lauper chronology
The Great Cyndi Lauper (2003)	At Last (2003)	Shine (2004)

Singles from At Last
- 1. "Walk On By" Released: November 2003; 2. "Stay" Released: March 2004

Professional ratings
Review scores
Source	Rating
AllMusic	3/5 stars

At Last is the eighth studio album by American singer Cyndi Lauper. The album is a collection of covers of jazz standards, in addition to a cover of a contemporary song re-arranged into a jazz song. The album features a duet with Tony Bennett on "Makin' Whoopee" and was co-produced by Lauper with Russ Titelman. The album's longbox was available only at Costco or Sam's Club shops within the first two weeks when it was released. In 2008 Lauper said in an interview with Brazilian newspaper Extra that the album was a special project, with the intervention of the record company and that she does not consider it as a "career album".

The album was well received by the public and music critics. AllMusic and Slant Magazine praised the album and gave it three stars out of five. The album debuted at #38 on the Billboard 200 with 47,000 copies sold in its first week, while the song "Walk On By" S.A.F. hit #10 on Billboard's Hot Dance Club Play and the Eddie X Mixes version hit the same chart at #15.

To promote the album, Cyndi headlined VH1 Divas Live 2004 alongside such artists as Patti LaBelle and Debbie Harry, performing "Stay" with Sheila E. on percussion. By 2012, it had sold 276,000 copies in the United States, according to Nielsen SoundScan.

== Track listing ==
No.	Title	Writer(s)	Original artist	Length
1.	"At Last"	Harry Warren; Mack Gordon	Ray Eberle	2:44
2.	"Walk On By"	Burt Bacharach; Hal David	Dionne Warwick	4:34
3.	"Stay"	Maurice Williams	Maurice Williams and the Zodiacs	3:14
4.	"La Vie en Rose"	Louis Guglielmi; Édith Piaf; (English adaptation by Mack David)	Édith Piaf	3:35
5.	"Unchained Melody"	Alex North; Hy Zaret	Todd Duncan	4:27
6.	"If You Go Away"	Jacques Brel (English adaptation by Rod McKuen)	Damita Jo	4:27
7.	"Until You Come Back to Me (That's What I'm Gonna Do)"	Morris Broadnax; Clarence Paul; Stevie Wonder	Aretha Franklin	4:40
8.	"My Baby Just Cares for Me"	Walter Donaldson; Gus Kahn	Eddie Cantor	2:37
9.	"Makin' Whoopee" (with Tony Bennett)	Donaldson; Kahn	Eddie Cantor	4:16
10.	"Don't Let Me Be Misunderstood"	Bennie Benjamin; Gloria Caldwell; Sol Marcus	Nina Simone	3:40
11.	"You've Really Got a Hold on Me"	Smokey Robinson	The Miracles	4:03
12.	"Hymn to Love"	Marguerite Monnot; Piaf; (English adaptation by Eddie Constantine)	Édith Piaf	3:33
13.	"On the Sunny Side of the Street"	Dorothy Fields; Jimmy McHugh	Fats Waller and his Rhythm	4:08
Total length:				49:58

== Personnel ==
- Russ Titelman - producer
- Cyndi Lauper - producer
- William Wittman - mixing
- Russ Titelman - mixing
- George Fullan - mix assistant
- Steve Gaboury - engineer
- Sharon Tucker - assistant engineer
- Peter Doris - assistant engineer
- Tim Stritmater - assistant engineer
- Brian Dozoretz - assistant engineer
- Jason Finkel - assistant engineer
- Elizabeth Collins - assistant engineer
- Kurt Marks - assistant engineer
- Jill Dell'Abate - production manager, contractor
- Ted Jensen - mastering
- Ryan Smith - mastering
- Lisa Barbaris - management
- David Massey - A&R
- Evan L - A&R coordinator

== Charts ==
Chart (2003)	Peak position
Australia (ARIA)	32
Canadian Albums (Billboard)	32
French Albums (SNEP)	85
Japanese Albums (Oricon)	205
Swiss Albums (Schweizer Hitparade)	50
UK Albums (OCC)	124
U.S. Billboard 200	38
U.S. Billboard Internet Albums	12

== Release history ==
Country	Date	Label	Format	Cat. No.	Ref.
United States	November 18, 2003	Epic; Sony	CD	EK 90760	
Japan	November 27, 2003	Epic; Sony	CD	EICP 290	
United Kingdom	December 1, 2003	Epic	CD	513476 2	
