= True Colors (Cyndi Lauper album) =

1986 studio album

Studio album by Cyndi Lauper
- Released: September 15, 1986
- Recorded: November 22, 1985 – May 31, 1986
- Studios: Power Station (New York City); The Hit Factory (New York City)
- Genres: Synth-pop; new wave; dance-pop
- Length: 37:57
- Label: Portrait
- Producers: Cyndi Lauper; Lennie Petze

Cyndi Lauper chronology
She's So Unusual (1983)	True Colors (1986)	The Best Remixes (1989)

Singles from True Colors
- 1. "True Colors" Released: August 15, 1986; 2. "Change of Heart" Released: November 11, 1986; 3. "What's Going On" Released: March 2, 1987; 4. "Boy Blue" Released: May 25, 1987; 5. "Maybe He'll Know" Released: May 12, 1987 (Europe)

True Colors is the second studio album by American pop singer Cyndi Lauper, released on September 15, 1986, by Portrait Records. The album spawned several commercially successful singles as "True Colors", "Change of Heart", and "What's Going On" reached the top 20 of the Billboard Hot 100, with the first two charting within the top five. The album was produced by Lauper and Lennie Petze.

Upon its release, the album received generally positive reviews from music critics. The album earned Lauper several awards and accolades, including two nominations at the 29th Annual Grammy Awards. True Colors peaked at number four on the Billboard 200 chart. The album is Lauper's second best-selling release with around seven million copies worldwide.

== Background and production ==
By the end of 1985, Lauper was established as one of the best-selling artists in the world. Her first studio album She's So Unusual (1983) was certified four times platinum by the Recording Industry Association of America (RIAA) and received a diamond certification in Canada for sales in excess of one million copies, making her the first singer to achieve such a feat at that time. According to Billboard magazine, the music industry was eyeing Lauper's next steps anxious to know if she could maintain the success of her debut.

In her autobiography A Memoir (2012), Lauper said that she had initially planned for Rick Chertoff, who had produced She's So Unusual, to produce what would become her second studio album; however, the experience with him was problematic and she changed her mind, and she likewise refused to produce the album with Rob Hyman since he was affiliated with Chertoff. True Colors was then produced by her and Lennie Petze, with Lauper also composing most of the songs on the album.

"The second album says, 'Have the courage of your convictions and love yourself a little'," Lauper told The New York Times in 1986, adding that she wanted its songs "to say, 'Love yourself', because we really are taught not to. When babies are born, they're just nuts about everything about themselves. Then, as we get older, we're taught that, oooh, that's disgusting, and that if we like ourselves then that's considered conceit. That's part of the album, too—not to be so hard on yourself."

The title song, written by Billy Steinberg and Tom Kelly, has been covered by many other artists, and was used as the theme song for the 1988 Summer Olympics, the 2003 Rugby World Cup and for Kodak cameras and film.

In 2010, the song was also featured on the soundtrack of Sex and the City 2. True Colors was reissued in a Japanese exclusive limited edition box set 11-track digitally remastered CD album.

== Critical reception ==
Professional ratings
Review scores
Source	Rating
AllMusic	3.5/5 stars
Classic Pop	4/5 stars
Q	4/5 stars
The Village Voice	B−

True Colors received favorable reviews from music critics. In the Chicago Tribune, Lynn Van Matre praised it as a "winning effort" with "plenty of fun", while Ian Cranna singled out Lauper's "outstanding, marvellous voice" for praise in Q, stating that "she breathes life into the songs, and slowly but surely the strengths of this LP begin to reveal themselves through the unorthodox structures and treatments." Jimmy Guterman from Rolling Stone wrote that Lauper "sounds more comfortable at any given moment on True Colors than she did on all of She's So Unusual", and that the album "seems to indicate her extreme ease in her new surroundings". Noting that "she's found a new sense of peace—or at least she's heading in that direction", Guterman also opined, however, that "her uneasiness gave her early work much of its spark; what places True Colors a notch below her debut is that Cyndi Lauper just isn't that unusual anymore." The Village Voice's Robert Christgau was less impressed, commenting that the first side of the LP consists of "cheap sentiment" and is "disheartening" and that "the second isn't much more than a relief", before concluding, "girls just want to have money—and no fun changes everything."

In a retrospective assessment for AllMusic, Eugene Chadbourne wrote that while True Colors is "ambitious" and "some of the stretches really pay off", some of its aspects "date badly", like the "highly reverberated and artificial sounding drums and keyboards" which "were really popular at the time". He concluded that despite those problems "there really wasn't that much music recorded by this artist during her most popular period, so fans will no doubt want to own it all." Writing for Classic Pop, John Earls said that although the album's "unusually subdued" cover songs "suggested severe writers' block", the remaining tracks "had no such worries, whether in the peerless title track or the doo-wop delight in 'Change of Heart'."

The pan-European magazine Music & Media named True Colors one of its "albums of the week" in the issue dated October 4, 1986. The magazine felt the album "boasted several hit singles", noting the album began "confidently" with "Change of Heart", had a "striking" cover of Marvin Gaye's "What's Going On", with "good build up and atmosphere", and showcased "terrific vocal form" on the song "Boy Blue".

Music Week was less positive on the album, describing it as "an album which can't decide whether to be sincere or wacky", and feeling that Cyndi "succumbs too often to the temptation of simply sounding cute" despite being "capable of a far greater sensitivity as a singer and a performer".

== Commercial performance ==
In the United States, True Colors has been certified double platinum by the RIAA and peaked at number four on the Billboard 200. It topped the Australian chart for four weeks and, in Japan, outsold She's So Unusual, although that was not the case in most countries. The album produced the singles "True Colors" (No. 1 Billboard Hot 100), "Change of Heart" (No. 3), "What's Going On" (No. 12), and "Boy Blue" (No. 71). Each single had a music video although the video for "Boy Blue" was just a live performance from her Le Zénith concert in Paris, France. According to Lauper's official website, the album was certified 4× Platinum in Australia and Platinum in Italy. The album sold around 7 million copies worldwide.

== Track listing ==
Side one
No.	Title	Writer(s)	Publisher	Length
1.	"Change of Heart"	Essra Mohawk; Cyndi Lauper (additional lyrics)	Stone & Muffin Music Corp., Rella Music	4:22
2.	"Maybe He'll Know"	Lauper; John Turi	Rella Music, Turi Music	4:25
3.	"Boy Blue"	Lauper; Stephen Broughton Lunt; Jeff Bova	Rella Music, Perfect Punch Music, Liquid Crystal Music	4:46
4.	"True Colors"	Tom Kelly; Billy Steinberg	Denise Barry Music, Billy Steinberg Music	3:46
5.	"Calm Inside the Storm"	Lauper; Rick Derringer	Scratch & Shift Music; Rella Music	3:54

Side two
No.	Title	Writer(s)	Publisher	Length
6.	"What's Going On"	Al Cleveland; Renaldo Benson; Marvin Gaye	Jobete Music Corp., Stone Agate Music Division	4:39
7.	"Iko Iko"	Rosa Lee Hawkins; Barbara Anne Hawkins; Joan Marie Johnson; Sharon Jones; Marilyn Jones; Boogaloo Joe Jones; Jesse Thomas	Arc Music Corp., Melder Publishing Company, Trio Music Co., Warner-Tamerlane Publishing	2:08
8.	"The Faraway Nearby"	Lauper; Tom Gray	Rella Music, Gray Matter Publishing	3:00
9.	"911"	Lauper; Lunt	Rella Music, Perfect Punch Music	3:16
10.	"One Track Mind"	Lauper; Jimmy Bralower; Lennie Petze; Bova	Rella Music, Fancy Footwork Music, Liquid Crystal Music, Red Sox Music	3:41
Total length:				37:57

Bonus track (2008 Japan reissue)
No.	Title	Writer(s)	Length
11.	"True Colors" (Live at Summer Sonic, 2007)	Kelly; Steinberg	4:38
Total length:			42:35

35th Anniversary edition bonus tracks (2021)
No.	Title	Writer(s)	Length
11.	"Heading for the Moon" (B-side of "True Colors")	Lauper; Arthur Stead; Lunt	3:19
12.	"True Colors" (Junior Vasquez Pride Mix)	Kelly; Steinberg	13:36
Total length:			54:52

=== 40th Anniversary edition ===
On 15 September 2026 it was announced that True Colors would be reissued as an expanded digital deluxe edition and a limited edition "Rainbow Sprinkle" double vinyl pressing in celebration of the album's 40th anniversary. This edition includes 2 previously unreleased songs and an audio version of the Cyndi Lauper in Paris video release from 1987, where Cyndi performed at Le Zenith in Paris. The two previously unreleased songs are "The River Cried", also recorded by Patty Smyth for her album Never Enough (1987), and a cover of "Across the Universe" (1970) by the Beatles that Cyndi recorded with producer Lennie Petze, intended for the unfinished animated film Strawberry Fields. The vinyl release has a reduced number of bonus tracks compared to the digital release. The vinyl release only has one bonus song, "The River Cried", and 11 out of the 17 live tracks, omitting the five songs from She's So Unusual and the "Band Introduction" track.

40th Anniversary edition bonus tracks
No.	Title	Writer(s)	Length
11.	"The River Cried"	Kelly; Steinberg	4:03
12.	"Across the Universe"	John Lennon; Paul McCartney	4:44
Total length:			46:44

Cyndi Lauper in Paris – 40th Anniversary edition live album
No.	Title	Length
1.	"Change of Heart"	5:30
2.	"The Goonies 'R' Good Enough"	3:37
3.	"Boy Blue"	5:47
4.	"All Through the Night"	4:23
5.	"What's Going On"	4:56
6.	"Iko Iko"	4:00
7.	"She Bop"	5:31
8.	"Calm Inside the Storm"	4:14
9.	"911"	3:26
10.	"One Track Mind"	3:30
11.	"True Colors"	4:07
12.	"Maybe He'll Know"	4:11
13.	"Time After Time"	4:24
14.	"Money Changes Everything"	5:56
15.	"Band Introduction"	3:47
16.	"Girls Just Want to Have Fun"	7:25
17.	"True Colors" (A cappella)	3:48
Total length:		78:32

== Personnel ==
Musicians

- Cyndi Lauper – lead vocals; arrangements; backing vocals (4, 6, 7, 10); jam box (7); Emulator voice (10)
- Jeff Bova – keyboards (1, 3, 5, 8, 9, 10); arrangements (1, 3, 5, 8, 9, 10)
- Peter Wood – keyboards (2, 4, 5, 6); arrangements (2, 4, 6, 9); additional keyboards (3); synthesizer bass (7)
- Jon Goldberger – sound effects (7)
- Nile Rodgers – guitars (1)
- John McCurry – guitars (2, 3, 4, 8, 9, 10)
- Rick Derringer – guitars (5, 8)
- Adrian Belew – guitars (6); arrangements (6)
- Robert Holmes – guitars (6)
- Neil Jason – bass guitar (2, 4, 6, 9)
- Jimmy Bralower – LinnDrum programming; arrangements (1, 2, 5, 7–10); percussion (4, 7); jam box (4, 10)
- Anton Fig – drums (2, 6)
- Stephen Broughton Lunt – arrangements (3)
- Lennie Petze – arrangements (3, 5, 6, 7, 10); percussion (7); backing vocals (10)
- The Bangles – backing vocals (1)
- Billy Joel – backing vocals (2)
- Angela Clemmons-Patrick – backing vocals (4, 5)
- Ellie Greenwich – backing vocals (5)
- Aimee Mann – backing vocals (8)
- Pee-wee Herman (Paul Reubens) – guest operator (9)

Production

- Cyndi Lauper – producer; art direction
- Lennie Petze – producer
- David Wolff – executive producer
- Brian McGee – engineer; mixing
- Jon Goldberger – assistant engineer
- Tim Kramer – assistant engineer
- Dave O'Donnell – assistant engineer
- Jason Corsaro – additional mixing
- George Marino – mastering at Sterling Sound (New York, NY).
- Jude Wilder – product manager
- Holland Macdonald – art direction; design
- Annie Leibovitz – cover photography
- Bruce Ando – inner sleeve photography
- Patrick Lucas – hair stylist; make-up
- Ralph Scibelli – hair colorist
- Laura Wills – stylist

== Accolades ==
Year	Nominee / work	Award	Result
1987	"True Colors"	Grammy Award for Best Female Pop Vocal Performance	Nominated
1987	"911"	Grammy Award for Best Female Rock Vocal Performance	Nominated
1987	"True Colors"	MTV Video Music Award for Best Female Video	Nominated
1987	"What's Going On"	MTV Video Music Award for Best Cinematography	Nominated

== Charts ==
=== Weekly charts ===
Weekly chart performance for True Colors
Chart (1986–1987)	Peak position
Australian Albums (Kent Music Report)	1
Austrian Albums (Ö3 Austria)	15
Canada Top Albums/CDs (RPM)	8
Canadian Albums (The Record)	7
Dutch Albums (Album Top 100)	36
European Albums (Music & Media)	16
Finnish Albums (Suomen virallinen lista)	14
French Albums (IFOP)	13
German Albums (Offizielle Top 100)	20
Icelandic Albums (Tónlist)	5
Italian Albums (Musica e dischi)	23
Japanese Albums (Music Labo)	2
New Zealand Albums (RMNZ)	3
Norwegian Albums (VG-lista)	10
South African Albums (RISA)	2
Swedish Albums (Sverigetopplistan)	20
Swiss Albums (Schweizer Hitparade)	8
UK Albums (Official Charts)	25
US Billboard 200	4
US Cash Box Top 200	5

=== Year-end charts ===
1986 year-end chart performance for True Colors
Chart (1986)	Position
Australian Albums (Kent Music Report)	25
Canada Top Albums/CDs (RPM)	44
Japanese Albums (Oricon)	23

1987 year-end chart performance for True Colors
Chart (1987)	Position
Australian Albums (Kent Music Report)	84
Canada Top Albums/CDs (RPM)	92
New Zealand (Recorded Music NZ)	50
US Billboard 200	39

== Certifications and sales ==
Certifications and sales for True Colors
Region	Certification	Certified units/sales
Australia (ARIA)	Gold	35,000^{^}
Brazil (Pro-Música Brasil)	Platinum	300,000
Canada (Music Canada)	2× Platinum	200,000^{^}
France (SNEP)	Gold	100,000^{*}
Hong Kong (IFPI Hong Kong)	Gold	10,000^{*}
Japan	—	404,000
New Zealand (RMNZ)	Platinum	15,000^{^}
Switzerland (IFPI Switzerland)	Gold	25,000^{^}
United Kingdom (BPI)	Silver	60,000^{^}
United States (RIAA)	2× Platinum	2,000,000^{^}
Summaries
Worldwide	—	7,000,000
^{*} Sales figures based on certification alone.^{^} Shipments figures based on certification alone.

== Release history ==
Release dates and formats for True Colors
Region	Date	Label(s)	Format(s)	Cat. No.	Ref.
United Kingdom	October 6, 1986	Portrait	LP; Cassette	PRT 24948; 40-24948	
United Kingdom	October 20, 1986	Portrait	CD	CDPRT 26948	
