= The Brains =

American rock band

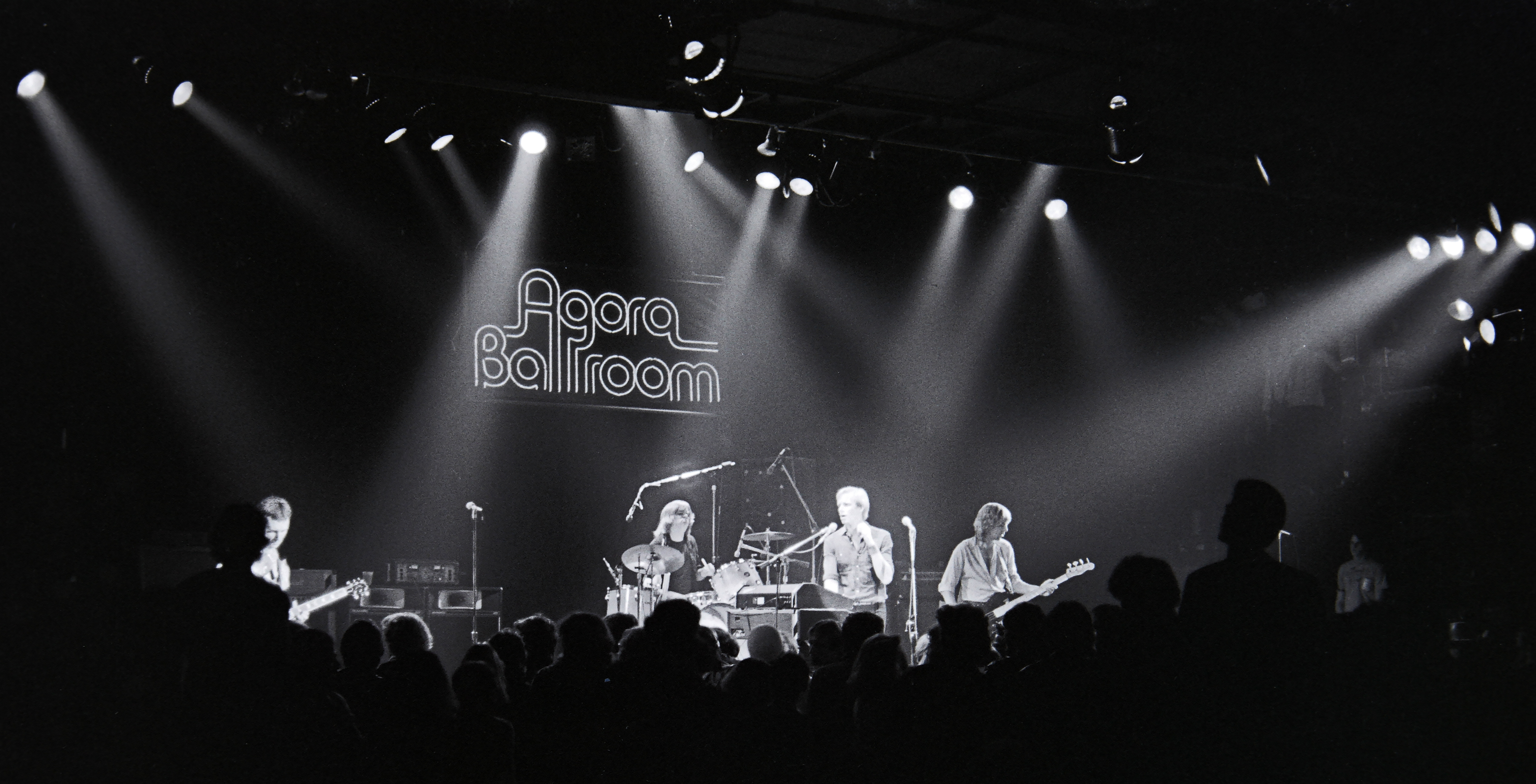
- The Brains at the Agora Ballroom, Atlanta, Georgia, on November 7, 1979

Background information
- Origin: Atlanta, Georgia
- Genres: New wave; alternative rock; pop rock
- Years active: 1978–1982
- Past members: Tom Gray; Keith Christopher; Rick Price; Mauro Magellan; Charles Wolff; Brian Smithwick

The Brains were an American rock band from Atlanta, Georgia, led by songwriter Tom Gray in the late 1970s and early 1980s. Their 1980 debut album was entitled The Brains, and was produced by Steve Lillywhite for Mercury Records. The album included "Money Changes Everything", originally released by the band in 1978, which became a hit single for Cyndi Lauper when she covered it in 1983. After a second Mercury recording in 1981, Electronic Eden (also produced by Lillywhite) and then an independently released EP, Dancing Under Streetlights, the band split up. A song from Electronic Eden, "Heart in the Street", was covered by Manfred Mann's Earth Band on their 1980 album Chance as "Heart on the Street."

The band appeared many times at Atlanta's premier new wave/alternative rock venue, 688 Club (named for its address, 688 Spring Street), referred to locally as simply "688." The video for Dancing Under Streetlights was filmed one night in Spring Street, out in front of the club. The video would receive light rotation on MTV in early 1983. They were also the opening act for the August 3, 1980 Devo concert at Atlanta's Fox Theatre, an April 1981 headlining performance at J.B. Scott's in Albany, New York, and the May 22, 1982, headlining performers at the Milestone Club in Charlotte, North Carolina.

Drummer Charles Wolff (born Charles Emerson Wolff on October 12, 1951) died of pancreatic cancer on September 11, 2010 at age 58.

Keith Christopher went on to join The Georgia Satellites, but was replaced as bass player in that band by Rick Price, guitarist for the Brains. The Brains' last drummer Mauro Magellan was the original drummer for the Satellites. Tom Gray also remained in the music industry and formed Delta Moon in the late 1990s.

Tom Gray later worked on remastering the old tracks and adding new ones according to Creative Loafing. He died on October 16, 2021, aged 70, from cancer.

== Group members ==
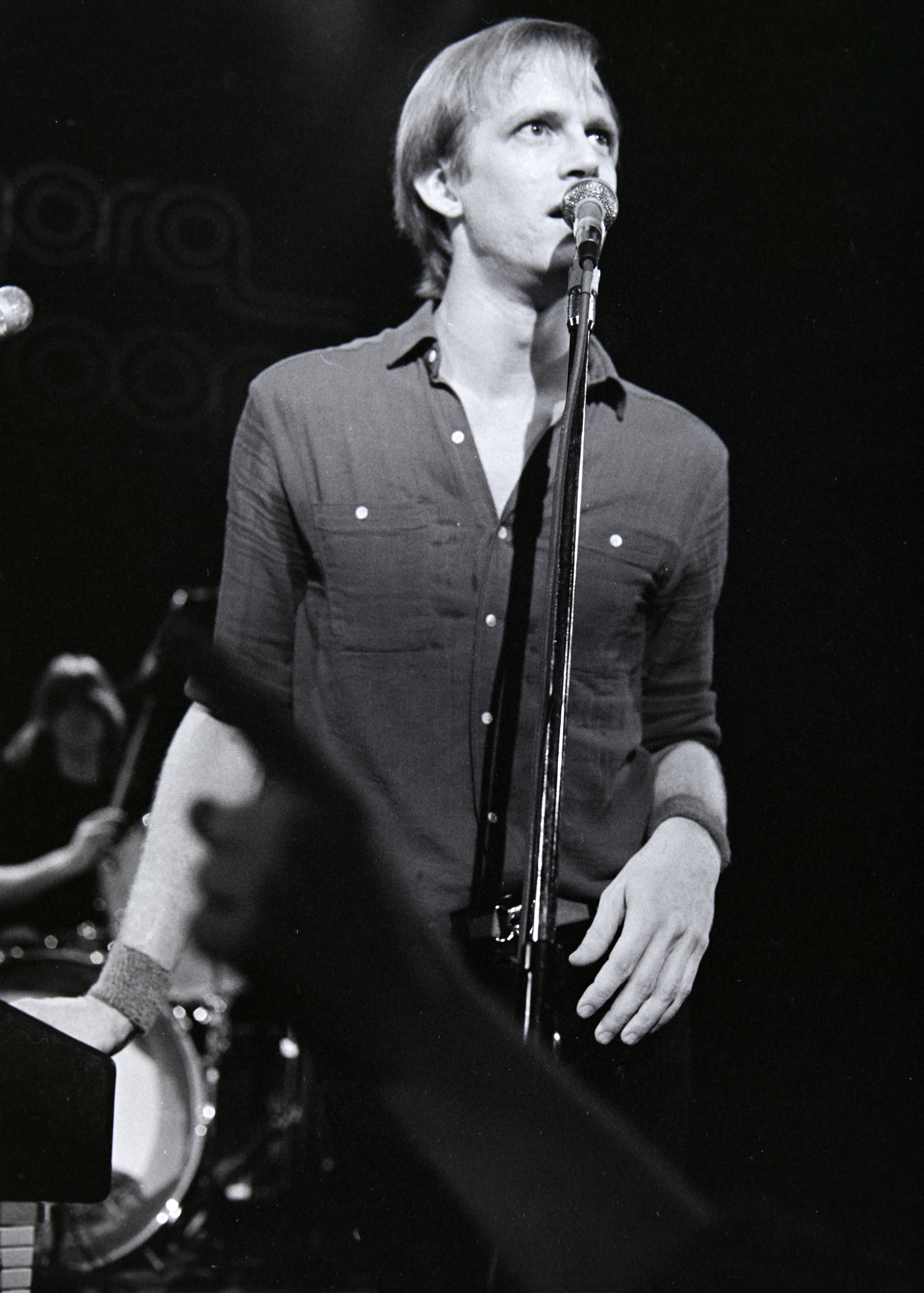
Tom Gray

=== Final lineup ===
- Tom Gray – keyboards, vocals (died 2021)
- Keith Christopher – bass
- Rick Price – guitar, vocals
- Mauro Magellan – drums

=== Past members ===
- Charles Wolff – drums (died 2010)
- Brian Smithwick – bass

== Albums ==
- 1980: The Brains
- 1981: Electronic Eden
- 1982: Dancing Under Streetlights (EP)
