= Maybe He'll Know =

Single by Cyndi Lauper

from the album True Colors
- B-side: "Time After Time"
- Released: May 12, 1987
- Recorded: 1986
- Studio: Power Station (New York, NY); The Hit Factory (New York, NY)
- Genre: Doo-wop
- Length: 4:25
- Label: Epic
- Songwriters: Cyndi Lauper; John Turi
- Producers: Cyndi Lauper; Lennie Petze

Cyndi Lauper singles chronology
"Boy Blue" (1987)	"Maybe He'll Know" (1987)	"Hole in My Heart (All the Way to China)" (1988)

"Maybe He'll Know" is a song by American singer Cyndi Lauper from her 1986 album, True Colors. It served as the fifth and final single of the album, released only in Europe in 1987. It is a remake of a song that Lauper recorded with her former band, Blue Angel. It appeared on their 1980 self-titled album The two versions are slightly different lyrically in a few lines. Billy Joel joins Lauper in 'doo wop' style back-up vocal duties.

== Blue Angel version ==
"Maybe He'll Know" opened up Blue Angel's 1980 debut album Blue Angel. The song was written by Cyndi Lauper and her bandmate John Turi. The track was produced by Roy Halee.

The song was regularly performed by the band. A live performance was televised on German TV show, RockPop, in 1980, following a performance by Daryl Hall and John Oates.

== True Colors version ==
Lauper resurrected the Blue Angel album track for her second solo album, True Colors. Billy Joel provides accompanying back ground "doo wop" vocals. The song was released as the fifth and final single of the True Colors album in Europe only, on May 12, 1987.

The single received radio adds in France in September 1987.

== Track listing ==
7"

- A. "Maybe He'll Know" (Special Version) – 3:44
- B. "Time After Time" – 3:59

12"

- A. "Maybe He'll Know" (Album Version) - 4:24
- B1. "One Track Mind" - 3:39
- B2. "Calm Inside The Storm" - 3:54
