= Blue Angel (Blue Angel album) =

Studio album by Blue Angel
- Released: 1980
- Recorded: 1980
- Genres: Rock; pop; power pop; rockabilly; new wave
- Length: 35:52
- Label: Polydor
- Producer: Roy Halee

Singles from Blue Angel
- 1. "I'm Gonna Be Strong" Released: 1980; 2. "I Had a Love" Released: 1980; 3. "Late" Released: 1980; 4. "Fade" Released: 1980

Professional ratings
Review scores
Source	Rating
AllMusic	4.5/5 stars
Billboard	Positive
Christgau's Record Guide	C+

Blue Angel is the self-titled lone album by the American band Blue Angel released in 1980. The band was formed by Cyndi Lauper on vocals, John Turi on keyboards and saxophone, Arthur "Rockin' A" Neilson on guitar, Lee Brovitz on bass and Johnny Morelli on drums. The band was fairly short-lived and the album was not a major success until after Lauper's solo career exploded.

The album has been reissued several times, being available for digital download in 2007, and on compact disc in 2023, following its limited CD reissue in 2005 through Universal Records.

== Track listing ==
All tracks are written by Cyndi Lauper and John Turi, except where noted.

Side one
No.	Title	Writer(s)	Length
1.	"Maybe He'll Know"		3:54
2.	"I Had a Love"		2:47
3.	"Fade"		2:54
4.	"Anna Blue"		3:57
5.	"Can't Blame Me"		2:37
6.	"Late"	Lauper, Turi, Lee Brovitz	2:53

Side two
No.	Title	Writer(s)	Length
7.	"Cut Out"	T. J. Fowler, Tom King, Ira Mack	2:17
8.	"Take a Chance"		2:36
9.	"Just the Other Day"		2:42
10.	"I'm Gonna Be Strong"	Barry Mann, Cynthia Weil	2:50
11.	"Lorraine"		3:44
12.	"Everybody's Got an Angel"	Blue Angel, Henry Gross	2:41

Notes

- Demo tracks have leaked to the internet that did not appear on the album. Titles include "Don't Know," "Magazine Cover," "What a Thrill" and "Witness". Many tracks were later re-recorded by Lauper including "What a Thrill," "Witness", "Maybe He'll Know" and "I'm Gonna Be Strong".

== Personnel ==
Blue Angel

- Cyndi Lauper – lead vocals, acoustic piano
- Arthur "Rockin' A" Neilson – guitar
- Lee Brovitz – bass
- John Turi – keyboards, saxophone
- Johnny "Bullet" Morelli – drums

Technical

- Roy Halee – production, engineer
- Lincoln Y. Clapp – assistant engineer
- Benno Friedman – photography
- Stephanie Zuras – design
- Bob Heimall – art direction
