= Boy Blue (Cyndi Lauper song) =

Single by Cyndi Lauper

from the album True Colors
- B-side: "The Faraway Nearby"
- Released: May 25, 1987
- Recorded: 1986
- Studio: Power Station (New York, NY); The Hit Factory (New York, NY)
- Genre: Synth-funk
- Label: Portrait; Epic
- Songwriters: Cyndi Lauper; Stephen Broughton Lunt; Jeff Bova
- Producers: Cyndi Lauper; Lennie Petze

Cyndi Lauper singles chronology
| "What's Going On" (1987) | "Boy Blue" (1987) | "Maybe He'll Know" (1987) |

Music video
- "Boy Blue" on YouTube

"Boy Blue" is a song by American singer-songwriter Cyndi Lauper, taken from her second studio album True Colors (1986). The track was penned by Lauper, Stephen Broughton Lunt, and Jeff Bova, with production by Lauper and Lennie Petze. It was released on May 25, 1987, as the fourth single from the album by Portrait Records. Proceeds from the sale of the single were donated to AIDS organizations.

"Boy Blue" became one of Lauper's lowest charting singles, and her shortest charting single on the US Billboard Hot 100, spending four weeks on it and peaking at number 71. A live version of "Boy Blue" was later released as the B-side of her single "Hole in My Heart (All the Way to China)".

== Background ==
"Boy Blue" came after Gregory Natal, a friend of Lauper's who was dying from AIDS, asked for her to write a song for him. He wanted her to release it "in the spirit of "That's What Friends Are For". She spoke of the process saying, "Most of my life I've been able to deal with the notion that there will always be people who are better and greater than I am, but I can't concentrate on other people. So I wrote "Boy Blue." I poured out my heart, and my liver, into that song."

The title comes from a poem by Eugene Field called "Little Boy Blue". This poem is based on a kid's story:

"Little Boy Blue"

The little toy dog is covered with dust,
But sturdy and staunch he stands;
And the little toy soldier is red with rust,
And his musket moulds in his hands;
Time was when the little toy dog was new,
And the soldier was passing fair;
And that was the time when our Little Boy Blue
Kissed them and put them there.

== Critical reception ==
Jonathan Kennaugh of Rough Guides described it as a "poignant track written after the death of a close friend." Ron Fell of the Gavin Report described its meaning saying, "Her boy blue is obviously a close personal friend who's a vulnerable, shy guy mugged of his innocence but still in possession of his soul and his dreams." Dave Sholin of the same publication positively praised the song saying, "Her endearing vocal style matches up wonderfully with the lyric of this song."

== Music video ==
The official music video for the song was a live video clip pulled from the Cyndi Lauper in Paris home video cassette and HBO special. It was directed by Andy Morahan.

== Track listing ==
Standard 7-inch single

1. "Boy Blue" – 3:58
2. "The Faraway Nearby" – 2:57

Standard 12-inch single

1. "Boy Blue" – 4:45
2. "Time After Time" – 3:59
3. "The Faraway Nearby" – 2:57

== Charts ==
Chart performance for "Boy Blue"
| Chart (1987) | Peak position |
|---|---|
| Belgium (Ultratop 50 Flanders) | 29 |
| Italy (Hit Parade Italia) | 51 |
| US Billboard Hot 100 | 71 |
| US Cash Box Top 100 | 84 |
