= What's Going On (song) =

1971 single by Marvin Gaye

Single by Marvin Gaye

from the album What's Going On
- B-side: "God Is Love"
- Released: January 21, 1971
- Recorded: June 1, July 6, 7 and 10, September 21, 1970
- Studio: Hitsville USA Studio A (main tracks), Studio B (supporting tracks), Motown Center (mixdown)
- Genre: Soul; R&B; progressive soul; psychedelic soul
- Length: 3:53 (album version); 3:40 (single version)
- Label: Tamla
- Songwriters: Al Cleveland; Renaldo Benson; Marvin Gaye
- Producer: Marvin Gaye

Marvin Gaye singles chronology
"The End of Our Road" (1970)	"What's Going On" (1971)	"Mercy Mercy Me (The Ecology)" (1971)

"What's Going On" is a song by American singer-songwriter Marvin Gaye, released on January 21, 1971, on the Motown subsidiary Tamla. It is the opening track of Gaye's studio album of the same name. Originally inspired by a police brutality incident witnessed by Renaldo "Obie" Benson, the song was composed by Benson, Al Cleveland, and Gaye and produced by Gaye himself. The song marked Gaye's departure from the Motown Sound towards more personal material. Later topping the Hot Soul Singles chart for five weeks and crossing over to number two on the Billboard Hot 100, it would sell over two million copies, becoming Gaye's second-most successful Motown song to date. It was ranked at number 4 in Rolling Stone magazine's 500 Greatest Songs of All Time in 2004 and 2010, number 6 on the updated list in 2021 and 2024, and at number 15 on its list of "The 100 Best Protest Songs of All Time" in 2025.

== Inspiration and writing ==
The song's inspiration came from Renaldo "Obie" Benson, a member of the Motown vocal group the Four Tops, after he and the group's tour bus arrived at Berkeley on May 15, 1969. While there, Benson witnessed police brutality and violence in the city's People's Park during a protest held by anti-war activists in what was hailed later as "Bloody Thursday". Upset by the situation, Benson said to author Ben Edmonds that as he saw this, he asked, "'What is happening here?' One question led to another. Why are they sending kids so far away from their families overseas? Why are they attacking their own children in the streets?"

Upset, he discussed what he witnessed with friend and songwriter Al Cleveland, who in turn wrote and composed a song to reflect Benson's concerns. Benson wanted to give the song to his group but the other Four Tops turned down the request. "My partners told me it was a protest song", Benson said later, "I said 'no man, it's a love song, about love and understanding. I'm not protesting, I want to know what's going on.'" In 1970, Benson presented the untitled song to Marvin Gaye, who added a new melody and revised the song to his liking, adding in his own lyrics. Benson later said Gaye tweaked and enriched the song, "added some things that were more ghetto, more natural, which made it seem like a story than a song... we measured him for the suit and he tailored the hell out of it." Gaye titled it "What's Going On". When Gaye initially thought the song's moody feel would be appropriate to be recorded by The Originals, Benson convinced Gaye to record it as his own song.

Gaye, himself, had been inspired by social ills committed in the United States, citing the 1965 Watts Riot as a turning point in his life in which he asked himself, "With the world exploding around me, how am I supposed to keep singing love songs?" Gaye was also influenced by emotional conversations shared between him and his brother Frankie, who had returned from three years of service at the Vietnam War and his namesake cousin's death while serving troops. During phone conversations with Motown executive Berry Gordy, who was vacationing in the Bahamas at the time, Gaye had told Gordy that he wanted to record a protest record, to which Gordy said in response, "Marvin, don't be ridiculous. That's taking things too far."

== Recording ==
Gaye entered the recording studio, Hitsville USA, on June 1, 1970, to record "What's Going On". Instead of relying on other producers to help him with the song, Gaye, inspired by recent successes of his productions for the vocal act, the Originals, decided to produce the song himself, mixing up original Motown in-house studio musicians such as James Jamerson and Eddie Brown with musicians he recruited himself. The opening alto saxophone line, provided by musician Eli Fontaine, was not originally intended. Once Gaye heard Fontaine's riff, he told Fontaine to go home. When Fontaine protested that he was just "goofing around", Gaye replied "you goof off exquisitely, thank you." The laid-back atmosphere in the studio was brought on by constant smoking of marijuana by Gaye and other musicians.

Jamerson was pulled into the session after Gaye located him playing with a band at a local bar. Respected Motown arranger and conductor David Van De Pitte said later to Ben Edmonds that Jamerson "always kept a bottle of [the Greek spirit] Metaxa in his bass case. He could really put that stuff away, and then sit down and still be able to play. His tolerance was incredible. It took a hell a lot to get him smashed." The night Jamerson entered the studio to record the bass lines to the song, Jamerson could not sit properly in his seat and, according to one of the members of the Funk Brothers, lay on the floor playing his bass riffs. De Pitte recalled that it was a track that Jamerson greatly respected: "On 'What's Going On' though, he just read the [bass] part down like I wrote it. He loved it because I had written Jamerson licks for Jamerson." Annie Jamerson recalls that when he returned home that night, he declared that the song they had been working on was a "masterpiece", one of the few occasions where he had discussed his work so passionately with her. Gaye also added his own instrumentation, playing piano and keyboards while also playing a box drum to help accentuate Chet Forest's drumming.

To add more to the song's laid-back approach, Gaye invited the Detroit Lions players Mel Farr and Lem Barney to Motown Studio B and, along with Gaye and the Funk Brothers, added in vocal chatter, engaging in a mock conversation. Musician and songwriter Elgie Stover, who later served as a caterer for Bill Clinton and was then a Motown staffer and confidante of Gaye's, was the man who opened the song's track with the words, "hey, man, what's happening?" and "everything is everything". Later Gaye brought Lem Barney and Mel Farr as well as Bobby Rogers of the Miracles to record the song's background vocal track. The rhythm tracks and the song's overdubs were done at Hitsville, while strings, horns, lead and background vocals were recorded at Studio B. The song was mixed in stereo at Motown Center studio on Woodward Avenue.

Upon hearing a playback of the song, Gaye asked his engineer Kenneth Sands to give him his two vocal leads to compare what he wanted to use for the song's release. Sands ended up mixing the leads together by accident. However, when he heard it, Gaye was so impressed with the double-lead feel that he kept it, influencing his later recordings in which he mastered vocal multi-layering, adding in three different vocal parts. Before presenting the song to Gordy, he produced a false fade to the song, bringing the song back for a few seconds after it was initially to have ended. The song was also notable for its use of major seventh and minor seventh chords, which was uncommon at the time. Gaye recorded the song's B-side, "God Is Love", on the same day.

After Gordy heard the song when Gaye presented it to him in California, he turned down Gaye's request to release it, telling Gaye that he felt it was "the worst thing I ever heard in my life." When Harry Balk requested the song be released, Gordy told him the song featured "that Dizzy Gillespie stuff in the middle, that scatting, it's old." Gaye responded to this rejection by refusing to record further unless the song was released, going on strike until, he felt, Gordy saw sense in releasing it.

== Commercial performance ==
Anxious for a new Marvin Gaye product, Balk got Motown's sales vice president Barney Ales to release the song on January 17, 1971, pressing 100,000 copies and promoting the single to radio stations across the country. The initial success of this led to a further 100,000 to answer demand, selling over 200,000 copies within a week. Though it was issued without Gordy's knowledge, he was satisfied with the high-volume sales. The song eventually became a huge success, reaching the top of the charts within a month in March of the year, staying at number one for five weeks on the Billboard R&B charts and one week at number one on the Cashbox pop chart. On the Billboard Hot 100, it reached number two, behind both "Just My Imagination (Running Away with Me)" by the Temptations and "Joy to the World" by Three Dog Night. Billboard ranked it as the No. 21 song for 1971. The song eventually sold more than two million copies, becoming the fastest-selling Motown single at the time. The song's success forced Gordy to allow Gaye to produce his own music, giving him an ultimatum to complete an album by the end of March, later resulting in the What's Going On album itself.

== Critical reception and legacy ==
The song was reviewed by Slant Magazine as a song that presented a contradictory sound, with the song's mournful tone contrasting the party atmosphere of the vocal chatter. In reviewing the What's Going On album, Rolling Stone critic Vince Aletti stated that while the song's lyrics were "hardly brilliant", the song itself helped to set the mood for the rest of the album, and that "without overreaching they capture a certain aching dissatisfaction that is part of the album's mood." Record World called it "a tasteful message song that's sure to go across the board" and said that "mellow and rhythmic, [Gaye's] performance perfectly matches the brilliant production here." Cash Box said "Marvin Gaye shows a new sound off in this fine release. Incorporating elements of jazz vocal and his old-fashioned smooth style, the artist is reborn." Billboard said that "this easy beat rocker has it to put [Gaye] right up the Hot 100 and Soul charts."

At the 1972 Grammy Awards, "What's Going On" was nominated for Best Arrangement Accompanying Vocalist(s), but failed to win.

Although "What's Going On" does not appear in the 1983 film The Big Chill it is included in both the Original Motion Picture Soundtrack and More Songs from the Big Chill.

"What's Going On" was ranked number 4 on the Rolling Stone list of "The 500 Greatest Songs of All Time" in the original 2004 ranking and the updated 2010 ranking, making it the highest-listed Marvin Gaye song. It was ranked number 6 in Rolling Stone's 2021 edition of the list and its 2024 revision. In 2025, the publication ranked the song at number 15 on its list of "The 100 Best Protest Songs of All Time." In 2016, it was voted number 2 in "Detroit's 100 Greatest Songs", a project based on voting by music experts and the public, conducted by the Detroit Free Press.

In 1999, music writers Paul Gambaccini and Kevin Howlett listed the song number 74 on BBC Radio 2's Songs of the Century. In 2003, Q magazine placed the song 64th out of its 1001 Best Songs Ever. In 2004, the Detroit publication Metro Times named it the "Greatest Detroit Song of All Time" out of 100 songs on the list. It also reached number 14 on VH1's 100 Greatest Rock Songs of All Time. In March 2012, New Musical Express named it the number 33 Greatest 1970s song on their list.

The song topped Detroit's Metro Times list of the 100 Greatest Detroit Songs of All Time, and in 2004, Rolling Stone magazine ranked it the fourth-greatest song of all time; in its updated 2011 list, the song remained at that position. It is included in the Rock & Roll Hall of Fame's 500 Songs that Shaped Rock and Roll list, along with two other songs by the singer. It was also listed at number fourteen on VH-1's 100 Greatest Rock Songs. In June 2026, CBS News included the song in its list of the 250 essential American songs of the past 250 years, one of three Gaye songs to make the list.

== Personnel ==
- Marvin Gaye – lead and backing vocals, piano and box drum
- Backing vocals by Marvin Gaye, Mel Farr, Lem Barney, Elgie Stover, Kenneth Stover, Bobby Rogers, and the Funk Brothers
- Instrumentation by the Funk Brothers and the Detroit Symphony Orchestra including:
  - Eli Fountain – alto saxophone
  - Robert White – acoustic guitar
  - Joe Messina – electric guitar
  - James Jamerson – bass
  - Chet Forest – drums
  - Eddie "Bongo" Brown – bongos, congas
  - Jack Ashford – tambourine, percussion

Production

- Marvin Gaye – producer, composer
- Renaldo "Obie" Benson – composer
- Al Cleveland – composer
- David Van De Pitte – arranger
- Steve Smith – recording engineer
- Mike McLean – recording engineer
- Ken Sands – recording and mix engineer

== Charts ==
=== Weekly charts ===
Weekly chart performance for "What's Going On"
Chart (1971)	Peak position
Australia KMR	69
Canada RPM Top Singles	76
US Billboard Hot 100	2
US Billboard R&B/Soul Singles	1
US Cash Box Top 100	1

1983 weekly chart performance for "What's Going On"
Chart (1983)	Peak position
UK Singles (Official Charts)	80

2011 weekly chart performance for "What's Going On"
Chart (2011)	Peak position
South Korea International (Circle)	78

2022 weekly chart performance for "What's Going On"
Chart (2022)	Peak position
Japan Hot Overseas (Billboard)	20

2025 weekly chart performance for "What's Going On"
Chart (2025)	Peak position
Israel International Airplay (Media Forest)	19

=== Year-end charts ===
Year-end chart performance for "What's Going On"
Chart (1971)	Rank
US Billboard Hot 100	21
US Cash Box Top 100	22
US R&B/Soul (Billboard)	2

== Certifications ==
Certifications for "What's Going On"
Region	Certification	Certified units/sales
United Kingdom (BPI) Sales since November 18, 2004	Platinum	600,000^{‡}
^{‡} Sales+streaming figures based on certification alone.

== Accolades ==
Accolades for "What's Going On"
List	Publisher	Rank	Year of Publication
500 Greatest Songs of All Time	Rolling Stone	4	2010
Detroit's 100 Greatest Songs	Detroit Free Press	2	2016
100 Greatest Rock Songs	VH1	14	2000
100 Songs That Changed the World	Q	39	2003
1001 Best Songs Ever	Q	64	2003
500 Songs That Shaped Rock	Rock & Roll Hall of Fame	N/A	1995
365 Songs of the Century	RIAA	65	2001

== Cyndi Lauper version ==
"What's Going On"

Single by Cyndi Lauper

from the album True Colors
- B-side: "One Track Mind"
- Released: March 2, 1987
- Recorded: 1986
- Studio: Power Station (New York, NY); The Hit Factory (New York, NY)
- Genre: Synth-pop
- Length: 4:41
- Label: Epic; Portrait
- Songwriters: Al Cleveland; Renaldo Benson; Marvin Gaye
- Producers: Cyndi Lauper; Lennie Petze

Cyndi Lauper singles chronology
"Change of Heart" (1986)	"What's Going On" (1987)	"Boy Blue" (1987)

Music video
- "What's Going On" on YouTube

American singer-songwriter Cyndi Lauper covered "What's Going On" for her second studio album True Colors (1986). Lauper's version is a synth-pop song. It was released on March 2, 1987, as the third single from the album. The album version of the song begins with a series of gunshots in reference to the Vietnam War while the single version is a remix with an alternate vocal used in the intro.

=== Critical reception ===
The pan-European magazine Music & Media named Lauper's cover of "What's Going On" one of its "records of the week" in its issue dated March 14, 1987, and noted that Cyndi was in "better vocal form" than on her previous single "Change of Heart". UK publication Music Week called the cover a "gem" and a "sensitive and inspired" version of Marvin Gaye's original, noting that it was "an adventurous choice" for a single that "should do well".

=== Chart performance ===
"What's Going On" entered the UK Singles Chart the week of March 14, 1987, at number 88. It peaked at number 57 which although was a low peak, was ten positions higher than the peak position of Lauper's previous single, "Change of Heart". In the United States, the track entered the Billboard Hot 100 at number 63. The track would reach a peak position of number 12 on May 9, 1987, in its ninth week. The track lasted 13 weeks in total and became her second single to fail to reach the US top ten following "Money Changes Everything".

"What's Going On" also broke the record for the biggest single-week decline on the American Top 40 radio countdown, falling to number 38 from number 16. The track did, however, become a dance hit thanks to club remixes by Shep Pettibone, cracking the top twenty of the Dance Club Songs chart. Lauper later stated in her autobiography that she had wished the song performed better.

=== Music video ===
Andy Morahan directed the video for "What's Going On" in New York City. The video was released on February 25, 1987 to music channel MTV. Lauper's version was nominated at the 1987 MTV Video Music Awards for Best Cinematography, where she lost to Peter Gabriel's "Sledgehammer".

=== Personnel ===
- Cyndi Lauper - lead and backing vocals, producer
- Adrian Belew – guitars, arrangements
- Robert Holmes - guitar
- Neil Jason – bass guitar
- Peter Wood – keyboards
- Jimmy Bralower - LinnDrum programming
- Anton Fig - drums
- Lennie Petze - producer, arrangements

=== Charts ===
Weekly chart performance for "What's Going On (Cyndi Lauper version)"
Chart (1987)	Peak position
Australia (Kent Music Report)	52
Belgium (Ultratop 50 Flanders)	27
Canada Top Singles (RPM)	30
Chile (Chilean Singles Chart)	19
Mexico (AMPROFON)	5
Netherlands (Single Top 100)	39
Netherlands (Dutch Top 40)	30
New Zealand (Recorded Music NZ)	30
UK Singles (Official Charts)	57
US Billboard Hot 100	12
US Adult Contemporary (Billboard)	29
US Dance Club Songs (Billboard)	17
US Dance Singles Sales (Billboard)	7
US Hot Crossover 30 (Billboard)	12
US Cash Box Top 100	15
US Top 12" Dance Singles (Cash Box)	15
US Adult Contemporary (Gavin Report)	14
US Top 40 (Gavin Report)	13
US Adult Contemporary (Radio & Records)	24
US Contemporary Hit Radio (Radio & Records)	11

=== Release history ===
Release dates and formats for "What's Going On"
Region	Date	Label(s)	Format(s)	Cat. No.	Ref.
United Kingdom	March 2, 1987	Portrait	7-inch	CYN 1	
United Kingdom	March 9, 1987	Portrait	12-inch	CYN T1	
United Kingdom	March 23, 1987	Portrait	7-inch picture disc	CYN P1	

== Charity versions ==
=== Live Aid Armenia cover ===
"What's Going On"

Single by Live Aid Armenia
- A-side: "What's Going On"
- B-side: "A Cool Wind Is Blowing"
- Released: 1989
- Recorded: 1989
- Genre: Pop
- Length: 8:48
- Label: Epic
- Songwriters: Al Cleveland, Renaldo Benson, Marvin Gaye
- Producers: Steve Levine (producer); Fraser Kennedy and Jon Dee (executive producers)

The remake of "What's Going On" was the first of the Rock Aid Armenia releases in aid of those suffering from the 1988 Armenian earthquake. The version credited to Live Aid Armenia featured Aswad, Errol Brown, Richard Darbyshire, Gail Ann Dorsey, Boy George, David Gilmour, Nick Heyward, Mykaell S. Riley, Labi Siffre, Helen Terry, Ruby Turner, Elizabeth Westwood and the Reggae Philharmonic Orchestra. The B-side was "A Cool Wind Is Blowing", Armenian duduk music played by Djivan Gasparyan. The record was produced by Steve Levine and the executive producers were Fraser Kennedy and Jon Dee. This was released as a single on Island Records.

=== Music Relief '94 ===
"What's Going On"

Single by Music Relief '94
- Released: October 24, 1994
- Genre: Soul
- Length: 3:52
- Label: Jive
- Songwriters: Marvin Gaye; Al Cleveland; Renaldo Benson
- Producers: Nigel Rush; Colin Fairley; Tony Swain; Tim Laws

In 1994, the song was covered in the Music Relief '94. This cover was released as a benefit single released in memory of the Rwandan genocide. The singers who participated in the project were C. J. Lewis, Roachford, Yazz, Aswad, Edwin Starr, Peter Cunnah of D Ream, Kim Appleby, Mick Jones of BAD, Rozalla, Tony Di Bart, Paul Young, Paul Carrack, Angie Brown of Ramona 55, Jimmy Ruffin, Omar, Apache Indian, Worlds Apart, Kaos, the Pasadenas, Gus Isidore, Jools Holland, Mark King of Level 42, Nik Kershaw, Larry Adler, and Dannii Minogue.

==== Charts ====
Chart (1994–1995)	Peak position
Germany (GfK)	72
UK Singles (Official Charts)	70
UK Airplay (Music Week)	29

=== Artists Against AIDS Worldwide cover ===
"What's Going On"

Single by Artists Against AIDS Worldwide
- Released: October 30, 2001
- Studio: Battery (New York City)
- Length: 4:19 (original mix)
- Label: Play-Tone, Columbia
- Songwriters: Al Cleveland, Renaldo Benson, Marvin Gaye
- Producers: Jermaine Dupri, Bono, the Neptunes, Moby

Audio video
- "What's Going On" (Dupri original mix) on YouTube

On October 30, 2001, a group of popular recording artists under the name "Artists Against AIDS Worldwide" released a single containing multiple versions of "What's Going On" to benefit AIDS programs in Africa and other impoverished regions. The single contains "What's Going On" along with eight additional remixes. The song was recorded shortly before the September 11, 2001 attacks, and it was decided afterwards that a portion of the song's proceeds would benefit the American Red Cross' September 11 fund as well.

Jermaine Dupri and Bono produced the radio single version, whose performers included Destiny's Child, Backstreet Boys, Britney Spears, Christina Aguilera, NSYNC, Darren Hayes of Savage Garden, Jennifer Lopez, Ja Rule, Nas, Lil' Kim, Sean "Diddy" Combs, Mary J Blige, Alicia Keys, Eve, Gwen Stefani, Nelly Furtado, Fred Durst of Limp Bizkit, Aaron Lewis of Staind, Michael Stipe of R.E.M., Wyclef Jean, Questlove of The Roots and Gaye's own daughter Nona, among other artists.

The collaboration was a success worldwide, peaking within the top 10 on the charts of Denmark, Ireland, and the United Kingdom and the top 20 on the charts of Flanders, Ireland, New Zealand, Sweden and Switzerland. In New Zealand, it went Gold for selling over 5,000 units. On the US Billboard Hot 100, the cover peaked at number 27, and it additionally reached number 24 on both the Billboard Mainstream Top 40 and Rhythmic charts. A music video was directed by Jake Scott.

==== Track listings ====
US maxi-CD single

1. "What's Going On" (Dupri original mix)
2. "What's Going On" (The London version)
3. "What's Going On" (Moby's version)
4. "What's Going On" (Fred Durst's Reality Check mix)
5. "What's Going On" (Mangini/Pop Rox mix)
6. "What's Going On" (Mick Guzauski's Pop mix)
7. "What's Going On" (Dupri R&B mix)
8. "What's Going On" (The Neptunes This One's for You mix)
9. "What's Going On" (Junior Vasquez's club mix)

UK CD single

1. "What's Going On" (Dupri original mix) – 4:19
2. "What's Going On" (Fred Durst's Reality Check mix) – 5:14
3. "What's Going On" (The London version) – 3:55

UK cassette single

1. "What's Going On" (Dupri original mix) – 4:19
2. "What's Going On" (Moby's version) – 4:36

European CD single

1. "What's Going On" (Dupri original mix)
2. "What's Going On" (Fred Durst's Reality Check mix)
3. "What's Going On" (The London version) – 3:55
4. "What's Going On" (Moby's version) – 4:36

==== Weekly charts ====
Weekly chart performance for "What's Going On"
Chart (2001–2002)	Peak position
Australia (ARIA)	38
Austria (Ö3 Austria Top 40)	51
Belgium (Ultratop 50 Flanders)	18
Belgium (Ultratip Bubbling Under Wallonia)	5
Denmark (Tracklisten)	2
Europe (Eurochart Hot 100)	13
France (SNEP)	55
Germany (GfK)	35
Ireland (IRMA)	8
Italy (FIMI)	5
Netherlands (Dutch Top 40)	24
Netherlands (Single Top 100)	26
New Zealand (Recorded Music NZ)	18
Scottish Singles Sales (Official Charts)	7
Sweden (Sverigetopplistan)	19
Switzerland (Schweizer Hitparade)	16
UK Singles (Official Charts)	6
UK Hip Hop/R&B (Official Charts)	4
US Billboard Hot 100	27
US Hot R&B/Hip-Hop Singles & Tracks (Billboard)	76
US Mainstream Top 40 (Billboard)	24
US Maxi-Singles Sales (Billboard)	11
US Rhythmic Top 40 (Billboard)	24

==== Year-end charts ====
Year-end chart performance for "What's Going On"
Chart (2001)	Position
Ireland (IRMA)	96
UK Singles (OCC)	161

==== Certifications ====
Certifications for "What's Going On"
Region	Certification	Certified units/sales
New Zealand (RMNZ)	Gold	5,000^{*}
^{*} Sales figures based on certification alone.

==== Release history ====
Release dates and formats for "What's Going On"
Region	Date	Format(s)	Label(s)	Ref.
United States	October 30, 2001	CD	Play-Tone; Columbia	
United Kingdom	November 5, 2001	CD; cassette	Columbia	
Australia	November 26, 2001	CD	Play-Tone; Columbia	

== Other notable cover versions ==
- Chaka Khan performed a version of the song with the Funk Brothers on the documentary, Standing in the Shadows of Motown, in 2002. The performance resulted in a win at the 45th annual Grammy awards for Best Traditional R&B Vocal Performance.
- U2 performed a version of the song on their release Spotify Singles, in 2017, as a promotion for their just released album, Songs of Experience.

== See also ==
- List of anti-war songs
