= Blue Angel (band) =

American band

- Also known as: Boppin' the Blues (1986)
- Origin: New York City, U.S.
- Genres: Rock; pop; power pop
- Years active: 1978–1982; 1986
- Label: Polydor
- Past members: Cyndi Lauper; John Turi; Arthur "Rockin A" Neilson; Lee Brovitz; Johnny Morelli

Blue Angel was an American band that featured Cyndi Lauper before her rise to fame as a solo singer. The lineup also included John Turi on keyboards and saxophone, Arthur "Rockin' A" Neilson (guitar), Lee Brovitz (bass guitar) and Johnny Morelli (drums). Lauper and Turi wrote the bulk of their material, and the group also covered pop standards, such as Barry Mann and Cynthia Weil's "I'm Gonna Be Strong" (which Lauper covered again on a 1994 album). Blue Angel were briefly popular on the New York club scene.

The band reformed without Lauper in 1986, under the name Boppin' the Blues. Lauper joined them on stage for a one-time performance at New York's Lone Star Cafe, singing a Big Mama Thornton song and "That's Alright Mama". They have since disbanded.

== Discography ==
Their only album, a self-titled effort, was released in 1980. It featured a sparse punk rock and new wave-styled cover in primary red, and floating band member photos. The album's sales were better overseas than in the United States. The only track to hit top 40 was "I'm Gonna Be Strong", which reached No. 37 in the Netherlands. Another song from the album, "Maybe He'll Know", was re-recorded by Lauper on her second solo album, True Colors, in 1986.

Blue Angel recorded a second album for Polydor in 1980; it was never released owing to a change in management at PolyGram Germany, and they, along with other artists, were dropped from the label. The band continued to gig around New York until 1982; their final concert took place that fall at Studio 54.

=== Albums ===
- Blue Angel (1980)

=== Singles ===
Year	Song	Album
1980	"I'm Gonna Be Strong"	Blue Angel
1980	"I Had a Love"	Blue Angel
1980	"Late"	Blue Angel
1980	"Fade"	Blue Angel

=== Re-releases ===
After Lauper's solo success, Blue Angel was re-released in LP and cassette formats in multiple countries. The yellow-covered Australian re-release uses a larger photo of Cyndi and includes "Blue Angel featuring" in small print above "Cyndi Lauper" in large print. The Japanese re-release also includes "featuring Cyndi Lauper", though the rest of the cover remains unchanged from the original release. In 2005, a 5000-copy compact disc pressing was released by Hip-O Select Records.
