= Money Changes Everything =

1978 single by the Brains

Single by the Brains

from the album The Brains
- B-side: "Quick with Your Lip"
- Released: 1978
- Genre: New wave
- Length: 3:35
- Label: Gray Matter
- Songwriter: Tom Gray
- Producers: The Brains; Bruce Baxter

The Brains singles chronology
"Money Changes Everything" (1978)	"Raeline / Treason" (1980)

"Money Changes Everything" is a song by the American rock band the Brains, released in 1978. It was included on their debut album The Brains in 1980. The song was reissued as the lead single from the album in 1980, by Mercury Records. Frontman Tom Gray is credited as the sole writer of the song, while production was collectively helmed by the Brains and Bruce Baxter. The song was popularized in 1984 by Cyndi Lauper, who released a cover version as a single from her debut solo album, She's So Unusual (1983).

== Background ==
The original single was released in 1978 by the Brains as a 45 rpm single on Gray Matter Records. The B side of the single was a song called "Quick with Your Lip". The initial underground success of the song led to the Brains being signed by Mercury Records. They rerecorded the song under the guidance of producer Steve Lillywhite for their 1980 debut album, The Brains. Critic Greil Marcus, listing it at number 10 of his Real-Life Rock Top Ten 1979, said, "Singer Tom Gray told his story in a strangled voice, as if he were trying to explain, but instead he laid a curse. This damned single ranks higher than I've placed it, but if it were anywhere else I couldn't end with it, and there's no other way the decade could end." Marcus would later write of the song, "It was hard, it hurt, and Cyndi Lauper's version makes the original sound compromised. She makes you wonder if Brains composer and singer Tom Gray even knew what he was talking about."

Gray, with his band Delta Moon, also recorded a version of the song for their 2007 album Clear Blue Flame.

== Critical reception ==
The single was ranked the 9th best single of 1979 on The Village Voice year-end Pazz & Jop critics' poll, with Robert Christgau naming it that year's best single on his "Dean's List". Ralph Heibutzki of AllMusic highlighted the "sassy cynicism" of the song, further commenting that "Money Changes Everything" represented a concession to "mainstream sensibilities" for the Brains.

== Track listings and formats ==
- 7-inch vinyl
1. "Money Changes Everything" – 3:35
2. "Quick With Your Lip" – 3:23
- 7-inch vinyl reissue
1. "Money Changes Everything" – 3:25
2. "Girl in a Magazine" – 3:07

== Credits and personnel ==
Credits and personnel are adapted from the "Money Changes Everything" single liner notes.

- Bryan Smithwick – bass, producer
- Tom Gray – writer, vocals, keyboards, producer
- Charles Wolff – drums, producer
- Rick Price – guitar, producer
- Bruce Baxter – producer

== Cyndi Lauper version ==
"Money Changes Everything"

Single by Cyndi Lauper

from the album She's So Unusual
- B-side: "He's So Unusual"; "Yeah Yeah"
- Released: May 21, 1984 (UK); December 1984 (US)
- Recorded: June 1983
- Studio: The Record Plant, New York City
- Genre: Hard rock; post-punk
- Length: 5:02 (album version); 3:59 (single edit)
- Label: Epic
- Songwriter: Tom Gray
- Producer: Rick Chertoff

Cyndi Lauper singles chronology
"All Through the Night" (1984)	"Money Changes Everything" (1984)	"When You Were Mine" (1985)

Music video
- "Money Changes Everything" on YouTube

Cyndi Lauper's recording of "Money Changes Everything" was released as the fifth US single from her album She's So Unusual. It was released in December of 1984 as single in U.S. and other regions. Although it was released earlier in May 1984 in the U.K., but was re-released with the new single version in February of 1985. It has been released in over 27 variations across the world, the most common being a two track 7-inch vinyl single (with varying covers). There was also a less common 12-inch vinyl single version. Lauper's cover features an appearance by Rob Hyman of the band the Hooters, playing his "hooter" (a Hohner Melodica) on the song's solo.

Lauper recorded an acoustic version, with guest artist Adam Lazzara (from the band Taking Back Sunday), for her 2005 album The Body Acoustic. "Money Changes Everything" as the 5th single, became She's So Unusual's first release to fail to achieve top 5 status on the Billboard Hot 100, peaking at number 27.

=== Critical reception ===
Stewart Mason of AllMusic praised Lauper's cover version, stating that the song's arrangement "is brighter, sharper and much more commercial than the Brains' rather weedy, comparatively lo-fi and dullish take on their own song." He further praised Lauper's singing abilities, particularly the long note she holds at the climax of the song. Billboard described the song as "hard rock meets hard realities" and designated it as one of the new releases with the greatest chart potential. Cash Box called the song "a hard rocking effort which forgoes any novel vocal twist" that provides "a sad look at the realities of cash and its effects."

Writing for Music Week at the time of the first UK single release in May 1984, Jerry Smith gave a negative review of Cyndi's cover, calling it "weak US pop with a thin synthesizer sound" and criticising her "horrible whining voice screeching over the top". However, when the single was re-released in the United Kingdom in February 1985, Smith wrote a less negative review, stating that it was "one of her more commercial numbers", featuring her "characteristic vocal" over "bright, catchy backing".

On Peru's most prestigious radio station, Radio Panamericana, "Money Changes Everything" was in the Top 20 year end charts.

=== Music video ===
The music video was made available for programming in the United States in November 1984. It was directed by Pat Burch and Phil Tuckett for NFL Films.

=== Track listings and releases ===
US 7-inch single

1. "Money Changes Everything" (Live) – 4:13
2. "Money Changes Everything" (Edit) – 3:59

UK 7-inch single (first release)

1. "Money Changes Everything" (Edit) – 3:58
2. "He's So Unusual" – 0:45
3. "Yeah Yeah" – 3:17

UK 7-inch single (second release)

1. "Money Changes Everything" (Edit) – 3:58
2. "Money Changes Everything" (Live) – 4:13

European 12-inch single

1. "Money Changes Everything" (That Live Version) – 6:04
2. "Money Changes Everything" (This Live Version) – 5:29

Japanese 12-inch single

1. "Money Changes Everything" (Special Live Extended Version) – 6:26
2. "Money Changes Everything" (Special Live Version) – 5:51

UK 12-inch single (first release)

1. "Money Changes Everything" (LP version) – 5:02
2. "He's So Unusual" – 0:45
3. "Yeah Yeah" – 3:17
4. "Girls Just Want to Have Fun" (Xtra Fun) – 5:05

UK 12-inch single (second release)

1. "Money Changes Everything" (LP version) – 5:02
2. "Money Changes Everything" (Live) – 6:23
3. "Girls Just Want to Have Fun" (Xtra Fun) – 5:05

=== Personnel ===
- Cyndi Lauper – lead vocals, backing vocals, arrangements
- Rob Hyman – keyboards, backing vocals, arrangements
- Eric Bazilian – arrangements, melodica, guitars, backing vocals
- Neil Jason – bass guitar
- Anton Fig – drums, percussion

=== Charts ===
Chart (1984–85)	Peak position
Australia (Kent Music Report)	19
Canada - RPM Magazine	23
Chilean Singles Chart	10
Colombian Singles Chart	3
New Zealand RIANZ Singles Chart	14
U.S. Billboard Hot 100	27
U.S. Billboard Mainstream Rock Tracks	37
U.S. Cash Box Top 100 Singles	31
West Germany (Gfk)	54

=== Release history ===
Region	Date	Format(s)	Label(s)	ID	Ref.
United Kingdom	May 21, 1984	7-inch single; 12-inch single	Portrait; Epic	A4481; TA4481	
United Kingdom (re-release)	February 11, 1985	7-inch single; 12-inch single	Portrait; Epic	A6009; TA6009	
