= Barbed Wire and Roses =

2002 song by Pinmonkey

Single by Pinmonkey

from the album Pinmonkey
- Released: April 13, 2002
- Genre: Country
- Length: 3:15
- Label: BNA
- Songwriter(s): Tia Sillers, Mark Selby, Sean Locke
- Producer(s): Mike Poole, Paul Worley

Pinmonkey singles chronology
"Barbed Wire and Roses" (2002)	"I Drove All Night" (2002)

"Barbed Wire and Roses" is a song written by Tia Sillers, Mark Selby, and Sean Locke, and recorded by American country music band Pinmonkey. It was released in 2002 via BNA Records as their debut single, and reached number 25 on the Billboard Hot Country Songs charts.

== History ==
Pinmonkey was signed to BNA Records in 2002 when record executive Joe Galante heard the band perform at a Nashville nightclub. While signing with BNA Records, the band independently released an album they had already completed, titled Speak No Evil, alongside their debut BNA single "Barbed Wire and Roses". Released in April 2002, "Barbed Wire and Roses" was the second-most added song to the playlists of radio stations surveyed by Billboard upon release.

== Critical reception ==
Jack Leaver of The Grand Rapids Press wrote in a review of the album, "while it has a memorable hook and infectious groove, the song is far from the best track". An uncredited review in the Grand Junction, Colorado, Daily Sentinel called the song "only the mainstream tip of this versatile bevy of seasoned Nashville veterans' repertoire." Billboard writer Deborah Evans Price described the song as "swampy" and compared the band's sound to Diamond Rio.

== Chart performance ==
Chart (2002)	Peak position
US Hot Country Songs (Billboard)	25
