= Pinmonkey (album) =

Studio album by Pinmonkey
- Released: October 8, 2002
- Genre: Country
- Label: BNA
- Producers: Mike Poole; Paul Worley

Pinmonkey chronology
| Speak No Evil (2002) | Pinmonkey (2002) | Big Shiny Cars (2006) |

Pinmonkey is the second studio album by American country music band Pinmonkey. It was issued in late 2002 on BNA Records. The album contains two singles: "Barbed Wire and Roses" and a cover of Cyndi Lauper's "I Drove All Night", both of which charted on Billboard Hot Country Songs. It was co-produced by Paul Worley and Mike Poole. The album received favorable critical reception for the band's musicianship.

== History ==
Before signing with BNA Records in 2002, Pinmonkey self-released an album titled Speak No Evil. Record executive Joe Galante allowed the band to release this project while signing to BNA Records, as he thought doing so would allow them to have a project to promote while on tour.

Pinmonkey contains two singles. First was "Barbed Wire and Roses", which peaked at number 25 on Billboard Hot Country Songs in 2002. The second single was a cover of Cyndi Lauper's "I Drove All Night", which the band took to number 36 on the same chart. According to an interview with Country Standard Time, the decision to cover "I Drove All Night" was recommended by group member Chad Jeffers's girlfriend, who was a fan of Lauper's music. Additionally, lead singer Michael Reynolds sought out a cover of Dolly Parton's "Falling Out of Love with Me" because he wanted to include a Parton cover on the album; however, he did not think the song was suitable for Pinmonkey until he heard Chad sing it. Joe Galante, then the president of their label, gave Parton a call and she came to the studio to provide Background vocals for the song. Additional songs on the album include Sugar Ray's "Fly", Gwil Owen's "Augusta", and the Staples Singers's "Stay with Us", as well as two songs, "Jar Of Clay" and "The Longest Road", written by Michael Reynolds.

== Critical reception ==
Deborah Evans Price of Billboard found influences of bluegrass, swamp rock, and country rock in their sound. She also praised Michael Reynolds's lead vocals as "a clear, high tenor adept at up-tempos and stunning on...ballads". Jack Leaver of The Grand Rapids Press rated the album three-and-a-half stars out of four, praising the cover songs in particular, as well as the use of Dobro and vocal harmony. AllMusic writer Erik Hage praised the "tight musicianship" and Reynolds's lead vocals, giving the album four out of five stars.

== Track listing ==
| No. | Title | Writer(s) | Length |
|---|---|---|---|
| 1. | "Slow Train' Comin'" | Ashley Gorley, Melissa Peirce, Bryan Simpson | 3:49 |
| 2. | "Jar of Clay" | Michael Reynolds | 2:50 |
| 3. | "Every Time It Rains" | Leslie Satcher, Bobby Carmichael | 3:50 |
| 4. | "Augusta" | Gwil Owen | 4:54 |
| 5. | "Fly" | Charles Frazier, Alan Shacklock, Mark McGrath, Matthew Karges, Rodney Sheppard, Joseph Nichol | 3:20 |
| 6. | "Falling Down" | Jeff Skorik | 3:38 |
| 7. | "The Longest Road" | Michael Reynolds | 4:12 |
| 8. | "Falling Out of Love with Me" | Dolly Parton | 3:44 |
| 9. | "Barbed Wire and Roses" | Tia Sillers, Mark Selby, Sean Locke | 3:15 |
| 10. | "I Drove All Night" | Tom Kelly, Billy Steinberg | 3:29 |
| 11. | "Stay with Us" | Mavis Staples | 3:20 |

== Personnel ==
=== Pinmonkey ===
- Michael Reynolds – lead vocals, acoustic guitar
- Rick Schell – drums, percussion, acoustic guitar, background vocals
- Chad Jeffers – Dobro, lap steel guitar, banjo, acoustic guitar, background vocals
- Michael Jeffers – bass guitar

=== Additional musicians ===
- Bob Britt – acoustic guitar, electric guitar, 12-string electric guitar
- Al Perkins — electric guitar on "The Longest Road"
- Ricky Skaggs – mandolin on "Augusta"
- Bryan Sutton – acoustic guitar and mandolin on "Slow Train Comin'"
- Michael Webb – Hammond B-3 organ, electric piano, Farfisa organ, Wurlitzer
- Paul Worley — acoustic guitar, electric guitar
- Rusty Young – banjo and mandolin on "Slow Train Comin'"
- Dolly Parton - Background vocals on "Falling Out Of Love With Me"

=== Technical ===
- Carlos Grier - digital editing
- Erik Hellerman - recording
- Andrew Mendelson - digital editing
- Mike Poole - production, recording, mixing
- Denny Purcell - mastering
- Clarke Schleicher - recording
- Paul Worley - production

== Chart performance ==
| Chart (2002) | Peak position |
|---|---|
| U.S. Billboard 200 | 126 |
| U.S. Billboard Top Country Albums | 17 |
| U.S. Billboard Top Heatseekers | 3 |
