= A Night to Remember (Cyndi Lauper album) =

1989 studio album by Cyndi Lauper

Studio album by Cyndi Lauper
- Released: May 9, 1989
- Recorded: January 1, 1988 – February 28, 1989
- Studio: The Hit Factory (New York City)
- Genre: Pop rock
- Length: 39:53
- Label: Epic
- Producers: Cyndi Lauper; Lennie Petze; Phil Ramone; Eric "E.T." Thorngren

Cyndi Lauper chronology
The Best Remixes (1989)	A Night to Remember (1989)	Hat Full of Stars (1993)

Singles from A Night to Remember
- 1. "I Drove All Night" Released: April 24, 1989; 2. "My First Night Without You" Released: July 24, 1989; 3. "A Night to Remember" Released: October 16, 1989; 4. "Heading West" Released: December 4, 1989 (UK)

A Night to Remember is the third studio album by American singer Cyndi Lauper, released on May 9, 1989, by Epic Records. The album was originally set to be released in 1988, under the name Kindred Spirit, but was delayed until 1989 and the songs from the initial project were reworked. Although the album managed to score a top-10 single, it failed to enjoy the commercial success of her previous two albums, was met with mixed-to-poor reviews and in interviews, Lauper refers to it as A Night to Forget. Worldwide, the album has sold more than 1.5 million copies.

== Background and production ==
The album was originally conceptualized as a project called Kindred Spirit, due for release in October 1988, (Note: The pan-European magazine Music & Media listed Kindred Spirit with a September 1988 release date.) and was going to include the track "Hole in My Heart (All the Way to China)", but when that song and the film it was featured in, Vibes, were unsuccessful, the album was reworked. The original Kindred Spirit tracklist included 10 songs, eight of which were eventually included on the final album. The two songs that were removed were "Hole in My Heart," which would only appear on Japanese CD editions of A Night to Remember, and "Don't Look Back," written by Lauper and John Turi, which remains unreleased. The songs "A Night to Remember", "Dancing with a Stranger" and "I Don't Want to Be Your Friend" were added to the tracklist later on after the release date was pushed back to 1989, with the other songs being remixed some time between their original 1988 planned release date and their eventual release. The song "My First Night Without You" was previewed in October 1988 at CBS UK's annual conference, and the album was still known as Kindred Spirit at the time. By March 1989, the album's title had changed to A Night to Remember and was initially announced for an April release with this title. Some proof sheets of the original album artwork exist with the alternate title and track listing.

"Unabbreviated Love," penned by Lauper, Dusty Micale and Franke Previte, was recorded for the album but only appeared on the B-side of the "My First Night Without You" single.

The photo used in the album's final cover artwork was taken at the intersection of Plymouth and Pearl Streets, just east of the Manhattan Bridge, in Brooklyn, New York.

== Critical reception ==
Professional ratings
Review scores
Source	Rating
AllMusic	2/5 stars
Chicago Tribune	2.5/4 stars
Robert Christgau	C+
Los Angeles Times	2.5/5 stars
Number One	3/5 stars
Rolling Stone	3/5 stars

Critically, the album was met with mixed-to-poor reviews. Stephen Thomas Erlewine from AllMusic website retrospectively gave the album two out of five stars and wrote that with the album Lauper tried "becoming a self-consciously "mature" singer/songwriter" and that the album's songs didn't "always work" except for "I Drove All Night" which made "a lasting impression" and illustrated "what Lauper was attempting to achieve with the record". Chris Heim of the Chicago Tribune pointed out that the album bears the same name as the 1958 film about the Titanic; he gave the album two and a half stars out of five and wrote that the "crisp" and "spunky" production and the "appealing" vocals "can't quite keep this album and its predictable pop love song cargo afloat." Rolling Stone and the Los Angeles Times singled out Lauper's voice as a strong point, while noting the material was inconsistent. Other reviewers were more harsh: The New York Times criticized A Night to Remember's "anonymous vocals, songs full of submissive cliches and slapdash production", while The Village Voice, in comparing the album to Lauper's previous work, declared "How embarrassing to have placed hope in this woman."

Billboard magazine gave the album a 'spotlight' in its album reviews section for the May 20, 1989, issue. Despite this, the album was described as having "somewhat unchallenging settings", though the lead single "I Drove All Night" was marked out as a "solid" start to the album campaign and album track "Like a Cat" was also highlighted as of interest. Music & Media gave a positive review of the album, calling it "wayward, girlish pop aimed firmly at the charts" as well as "clever and sophisticated", and named it one of its "albums of the week".

In a review for Lauper's 1997 album Sisters of Avalon, People magazine retrospectively described A Night to Remember as "joyless" and blamed the album for her decline in popularity, stating that the album caused "a large chunk of her considerable following" to move on.

== Commercial performance ==
The album sold moderately well but did not enjoy the same commercial success of her two previous albums, despite the success of the album's lead single, "I Drove All Night", which became a Top 10 hit, her last in the US, earning Lauper a Grammy Award nomination. In the UK, however, A Night to Remember was Lauper's highest-charting album, peaking at No.9. According to the book St. James Encyclopedia of Popular Culture (Volume 3), the album sold half a million copies in the United States in 1989.

Although the album is called A Night to Remember, Lauper jokingly preferred to call it A Night to Forget, given its poor reviews and disappointing sales, compounded by the problems she encountered with producer and boyfriend David Wolff during the production of the album. Although not certified by RIAA, BPI and others trade associations, according to Lauper's official website, the album was certified platinum in Australia and United Kingdom and gold in Germany, Italy and United States. As of November 1989, the album had sold 1.3 million copies worldwide.

== Singles and popular album tracks ==
- "I Drove All Night" was the album's lead single and was released in April 1989. It was the most successful single from the album, reaching the top 10 of the singles charts in Canada, France, New Zealand, the United Kingdom and the United States, as well as the top 20 in Australia, Ireland, Finland and West Germany.
- "My First Night Without You" was released in July 1989 as the second single from the album worldwide. The song failed to achieve the same success as "I Drove All Night", stalling at no. 62 in the United States and reaching low Top 50 positions in Australia, Belgium and France.
- "A Night to Remember" was the album's third single in the United States, Canada, Australia and New Zealand, though failed to reach the top 100 in any of these territories.
- "Heading West" was released in December 1989 as the third single in the United Kingdom, where it reached no. 68 on the singles chart. It was also released as the third single from the album in Australia, Japan and continental Europe.
- "Primitive" was released in early 1990 as the fourth European single from the album but did not enter any singles charts. Music & Media named the song as a "sure hit" and described it as a "punchy rock song" with a "good dance beat".
- "Unconditional Love" was released in 1991 as an exclusive single in Hong Kong.

Despite not yet being a single, "Primitive" did receive airplay in Greece beginning in June 1989. "Insecurious" received radio adds in the United Kingdom in July 1989, but never became a single despite this. Soon after the album's release in Japan, "Unconditional Love" began receiving airplay on the radio station J-Wave in May 1989.

== Track listing ==
No.	Title	Writer(s)	Producer(s)	Length
1.	"Intro"	Cyndi Lauper	Cyndi Lauper; Lennie Petze	0:27
2.	"I Drove All Night"	Tom Kelly; Billy Steinberg	Lauper; Petze	4:11
3.	"Primitive"	Lauper; Kelly; Steinberg	Lauper; Petze	3:48
4.	"My First Night Without You"	Lauper; Kelly; Steinberg	Lauper; Petze	3:01
5.	"Like a Cat"	Christina Amphlett; Kelly; Steinberg	Lauper; Petze	3:23
6.	"Heading West"	Lauper; Kelly; Steinberg	Lauper; Petze	3:54
7.	"A Night to Remember"	Lauper; Dusty Micale; Franke Previte	Lauper; Petze	3:43
8.	"Unconditional Love"	Lauper; Kelly; Steinberg	Lauper; Petze	3:55
9.	"Insecurious"	Lauper; Diane Warren; Desmond Child	Lauper; Petze	3:31
10.	"Dancing with a Stranger"	Lauper; Previte; Paul Chiten	Lauper; Eric Thorngren	4:11
11.	"I Don't Want to Be Your Friend"	Warren	Lauper; Petze; Phil Ramone	4:21
12.	"Kindred Spirit"	Lauper	Lauper; Petze	1:16
Total length:				41:00

Bonus track (Japan)
No.	Title	Writer(s)	Producer(s)	Length
13.	"Hole in My Heart (All the Way to China)"	Richard Orange	Lauper; Petze	3:59
Total length:				44:59

Exclusive track (2008/2013 Japanese remaster)
No.	Title	Length
14.	"I Drove All Night" (live at Summer Sonic 2007)	3:59
Total length:		48:49

=== Notes ===
- In 2013, the 2008 Japanese remaster was reissued on BSCD2 format, with the same 2008 track listing.
- Tracks 13 and 14 are bonus tracks on the 2008 Japanese remastered mini-LP version, as well as its 2013 reissue.
- Track 14 recorded at the Summer Sonic Festival on August 12, 2007, in Chiba, Japan.

== Personnel ==
=== Musicians ===
- Cyndi Lauper – lead vocals, backing vocals, dulcimer, arrangements
- Jeff Bova – keyboards, arrangements
- Tommy Mandel – keyboards
- John Turi – keyboards, saxophone
- Peter Wood – keyboards
- Rockin' Dopsie (Alton Jay Rubin) – accordion
- Bobby Bandiera – guitar
- Eric Clapton – guitar (9)
- Dave Dale – guitar
- Rick Derringer – guitar
- John McCurry – guitar, coral sitar
- Rob Newhouse – guitar
- Paul Pesco – guitar
- Bootsy Collins – bass
- Leigh Foxx – bass
- Neil Jason – bass
- Bakithi Khumalo – bass
- T.M. Stevens – bass
- Tom "T-Bone" Wolk – bass
- Steve Ferrone – drums
- Jimmy Bralower – drum programming, arrangements
- Joe Bellia – drum machine
- Carole Steele – percussion
- George Recile – triangle
- Lennie Petze – arrangements (1–5, 7, 9, 10, 12)
- Eric "ET" Thorngren – arrangements (1–5, 7, 9–12)
- Billy Steinberg – arrangements (6, 8)
- Phil Ramone – arrangements (7, 11)
- Larry Blackmon – backing vocals
- Angela Clemmons-Patrick – backing vocals
- Gordon Grody – backing vocals
- Tomi Jenkins – backing vocals
- Tom Kelly – backing vocals
- Nathan Leftenant – backing vocals
- Franke Previte – backing vocals
- Frank Simms – backing vocals
- George Simms – backing vocals
- David Spinner – backing vocals

=== Technical ===
- Cyndi Lauper – producer
- Lennie Petze – producer (1–6, 8, 9, 12)
- Phil Ramone – producer (7, 11)
- Eric "ET" Thorngren – producer (10), recording
- David Wolff – executive producer
- Gary Lyons – recording
- Gary Wright – additional engineer, assistant engineer, recording (12)
- Tim Leitner – additional engineer, assistant engineer
- Rich Travali – additional engineer, assistant engineer
- Craig Vogel – additional engineer, assistant engineer
- Joe Pirrera – assistant engineer
- Dave McNair – mixing (12)
- George Marino – mastering at Sterling Sound (New York City)
- John Doelp – product manager

=== Artwork ===
- Cyndi Lauper – art direction, design
- Stacy Drummond – art direction, design
- Chip Simons – photography
- David Tabatsky – fire juggler on album cover

== Accolades ==
Year	Nominee / work	Award	Result
1990	"I Drove All Night"	Grammy Award for Best Female Rock Vocal Performance	Nominated

== Charts ==
=== Weekly charts ===
Weekly chart performance for A Night to Remember
Chart (1989)	Peak position
Australian Albums (ARIA)	17
Canada Top Albums/CDs (RPM)	37
Canadian Albums (The Record)	34
European Albums (Music & Media)	20
French Albums (IFOP)	15
Finland (Suomen virallinen albumlista)	21
German Albums (Offizielle Top 100)	21
Italian Albums (Musica e dischi)	18
Japanese Albums (Oricon)	3
New Zealand Albums (RMNZ)	11
South African Albums (RISA)	29
Swedish Albums (Sverigetopplistan)	32
Swiss Albums (Schweizer Hitparade)	18
UK Albums (Official Charts)	9
US Billboard 200	37
Zimbabwean Albums (ZIMA)	10

=== Year-end charts ===
Year-end chart performance for A Night to Remember
Chart (1989)	Position
Australian Albums (ARIA)	56
European Albums (Music & Media)	82
German Albums (Offizielle Top 100)	75
Japanese Albums (Oricon)	83

== Certifications and sales ==
Certifications and sales for A Night to Remember
Region	Certification	Certified units/sales
Australia (ARIA)	Gold	35,000^{^}
Brazil (Pro-Música Brasil)	Gold	100,000
Canada (Music Canada)	Gold	50,000^{^}
France (SNEP)	Gold	100,000^{*}
Japan (RIAJ)	Platinum	145,260
United States	—	500,000
^{*} Sales figures based on certification alone.^{^} Shipments figures based on certification alone.

== Release history ==
Release dates and formats for A Night to Remember
Region	Date	Label(s)	Format(s)	Cat. No.	Ref.
United Kingdom	June 19, 1989	Epic	LP; Cassette; CD	4624991; 4624994; 4624992	
