= George Ducas (album) =

Studio album by George Ducas
- Released: September 1994
- Length: 35:45
- Label: Liberty
- Producer: Richard Bennett

George Ducas chronology
George Ducas (1994)	Where I Stand (1997)

George Ducas is the debut studio album by American country music singer George Ducas. It was released in September 1994 on Liberty Records, and peaked at number 57. It featured four singles: "Teardrops" (number 38), "Hello Cruel World" (number 52), "Kisses Don't Lie" (number 72), and his biggest hit, "Lipstick Promises", which reached number 9.

== Critical reception ==
Rating it 3 out of 5 stars, Bill Hobbs of the Tampa Bay Times called the album's sound "so classic and yet so contemporary". He also considered the single "Lipstick Promises" to be the strongest track, comparing it favorably to Roy Orbison.

== Track listing ==
No.	Title	Writer(s)	Length
1.	"Teardrops"	George Ducas, Terry McBride	3:03
2.	"Kisses Don't Lie"	Ducas	3:46
3.	"Hello Cruel World"	Ducas, Ty Tyler	3:28
4.	"My World Stopped Turning"	Ducas, Gary Nicholson	3:02
5.	"Lipstick Promises"	Ducas, Tia Sillers	4:04
6.	"Shame on Me"	Ducas	3:20
7.	"Waiting and Wishing"	Ducas, Sillers	3:56
8.	"In No Time at All"	Ducas, Kim Richey	3:08
9.	"Only in My Dreams"	Ducas	4:11
10.	"It Ain't Me"	Ducas, Sillers	3:47
Total length:			35:45

== Personnel ==
Musicians

- Richard Bennett - acoustic guitar, electric guitar
- Billy Bremner - electric guitar
- Mike Brignardello - bass guitar
- Terry Crisp - pedal steel guitar
- Chad Cromwell - drums
- George Ducas - acoustic guitar
- Dan Dugmore - pedal steel guitar, acoustic guitar
- Glen Duncan - fiddle
- Dave Hoffner - piano, Hammond B-3 organ
- Larry Marrs - bass guitar
- Angelo Petraglia - acoustic guitar, electric guitar
- Hank Singer - fiddle
- Billy Thomas - drums

Background vocals

- Deryl Dodd
- George Ducas
- Jim Lauderdale
- Kim Richey
- Harry Stinson

Nashville Mandolin Ensemble

- Butch Baldassari - leader, first mandolin
- John Mock - arrangement, first mandolin
- Rob Haines - first mandolin
- Bob Alenko - second mandolin
- Fred Carpenter - second mandolin
- Charlie Derrington - mandola
- John Hedgecloth - mandocello

Strings

- John Catchings - leader, cello
- Richard Grosjean - viola
- Mary Van Osdale - violin
- David Davidson - violin
- Pamela Sixfin - violin
- Christian Teal - violin

Technical

- Richard Bennett - producer
- John Hampton - recording ("Teardrops" and "Kisses Don't Lie")
- Dave Hoffner - string arrangement
- Denny Purcell - mastering
- Rocky Schnarrs - recording (except "Teardrops" and "Kisses Don't Lie")

== Chart performance ==
Chart (1995)	Peak position
U.S. Billboard Top Country Albums	57
U.S. Billboard Top Heatseekers	36
