= Heading West =

Heading West may refer to:

- "Heading West" (song), by Cyndi Lauper
- Headin' West, 1922 film
- Heading West (film), 1946 film
