= Pinmonkey =

American country music band

- Promotional image of Pinmonkey, c. 2002 (L-R: Michael Jeffers, Chad Jeffers, Michael Reynolds, Rick Schell)

Background information
- Origin: Nashville, Tennessee, U.S.
- Genre: Country
- Years active: 2002–2006
- Labels: Drifter's Church; BNA; Back Porch
- Past members: Chad Jeffers; Michael Jeffers; Michael Reynolds; Rick Schell; Mike Crouch

Pinmonkey was an American country music band from Nashville, Tennessee. The band was formed in 2002 by Michael Reynolds (lead vocals, acoustic guitar), brothers Michael Jeffers (vocals, bass guitar) and Chad Jeffers (Dobro, lap steel guitar), and Rick Schell (drums, vocals). They released two albums in 2002: Speak No Evil independently, and Pinmonkey via BNA Records. The latter produced two singles in "Barbed Wire and Roses" and a cover of Cyndi Lauper's "I Drove All Night", both of which charted on Billboard Hot Country Songs. Schell and Chad Jeffers both left in 2005, with Mike Crouch briefly replacing the former. After these membership changes, Pinmonkey released their third album Big Shiny Cars on Back Porch Records in 2006 before disbanding. Afterward, the Jeffers brothers became backing musicians for other artists, Schell joined Pure Prairie League, and Reynolds released a solo album. Pinmonkey received general critical favor for Reynolds's singing voice, bluegrass and country rock influences, and the breadth of their cover song choices.

== History ==
Pinmonkey was founded by Michael Reynolds (lead vocals, acoustic guitar), Rick Schell (drums, vocals), Michael Jeffers (bass guitar, vocals), and Chad Jeffers (Dobro, lap steel guitar), the latter two of whom are brothers. The Jeffers brothers are natives of Kingsport, Tennessee, and had played in a band called the Habaneros, which was based out of Murfreesboro, Tennessee, in the 1990s. Chad attended Belmont University; after graduating in 1994, he worked in the mail room of Starstruck Studios, a recording studio owned by Reba McEntire, in addition to serving as a backing musician for the Wilkinsons. Rick Schell, a native of Homer, New York, moved to Nashville, Tennessee, in 1993. He had been hired by Steve Earle as a backing musician, which led to him also playing for Joy Lynn White, Buddy Miller, Chris Knight, and Elizabeth Cook. Michael Reynolds grew up in Natural Bridge, Virginia. His father's side of the family had several musicians who played bluegrass, and Reynolds himself sang in church as a child. He moved to Nashville after graduating high school, wanting to pursue a country music career. After working his first job at a McDonald's restaurant, he befriended Chad Jeffers in 1995. Reynolds went on to work various jobs in Nashville, including a record store called Cat's, an attorney's office, and the mail room of Capitol Records's Nashville branch. Reynolds initially performed at various Nashville venues as a solo artist, as a means of promoting his songwriting, through the suggestion of another Cat's employee. However, he felt uncomfortable performing by himself and thus had Chad perform with him. As they both wanted a bass player, Chad's brother Michael joined the two in that capacity. Rick Schell heard about Reynolds's music through connections the two had at the attorney's office, and the other three hired him to contribute on drums and sopranist harmony.

== Musical career ==
Once all four musicians were in place, they began performing at nightclubs around Nashville. Through connections Schell had made at the attorney's office, they hired Rick Alter as their manager. Originally, the four did not consider pursuing music full-time, and only performed when their schedules allowed it. However, due to positive fan reception, they chose to become a band. They were booked to play at a Nashville club called the Sutler, whose manager asked them to pick a name so the venue could advertise them. Reynolds chose "Pinmonkey" after a slang term for a pinsetter, a person who resets pins in the game of bowling. He came up with the name after hearing the word on an episode of The Simpsons. Record executive Joe Galante heard the band perform at 12th and Porter, another nightclub in Nashville, and signed them to BNA Records in 2002. Just before their signing with BNA, Pinmonkey had recorded an album titled Speak No Evil on the independent Drifter's Church label; Galante allowed the band to release the album, so they could have a product to promote before signing tour dates. Among said tour dates were eight stops on CMT's "Most Wanted Live" tour. One of tracks on Speak No Evil was a cover of Gwil Owen's "Augusta". The independent album received a positive review in Billboard, which compared the band favorably to Pure Prairie League and Poco, while also praising Reynolds's lead vocals and the musicianship.

=== 2002–2003: Pinmonkey ===
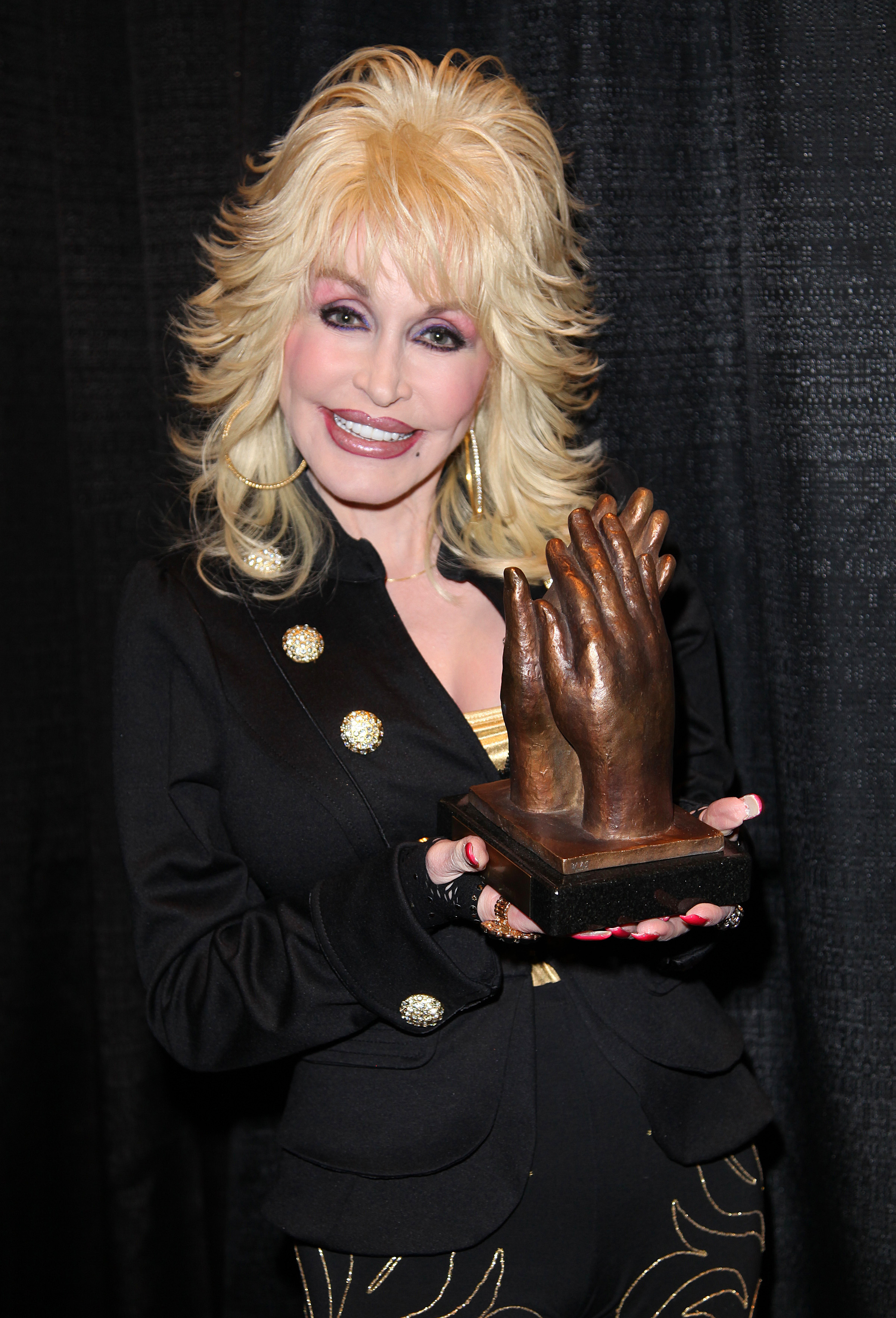
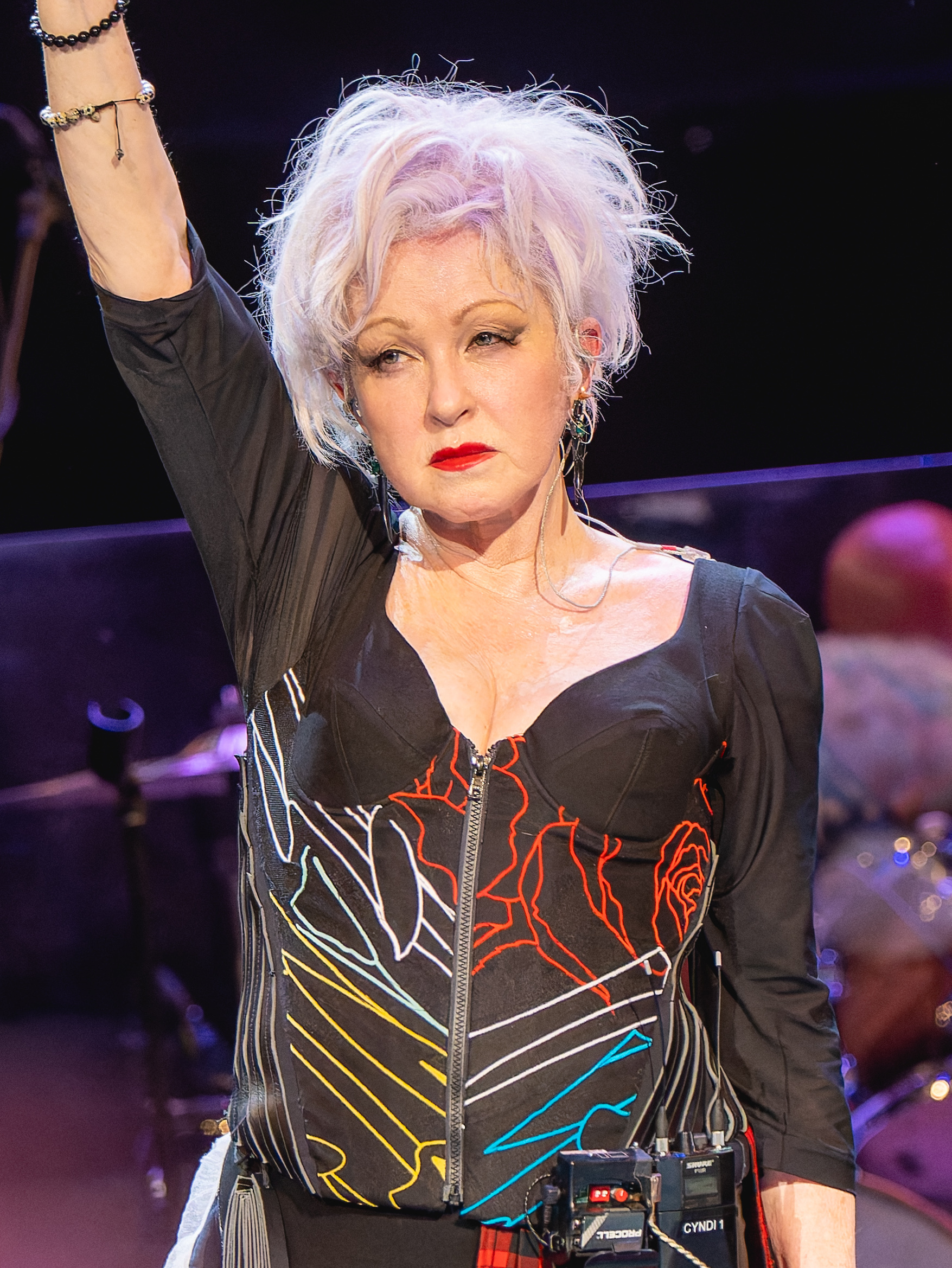
Pinmonkey's self-titled album included covers of Dolly Parton (left) and Cyndi Lauper (right).

In April 2002, BNA released the band's debut single "Barbed Wire and Roses". Co-written by Tia Sillers, Mark Selby, and Sean Locke, the song peaked at number 25 on the Billboard Hot Country Songs charts. It served as the lead-off single to their self-titled album, released in late 2002. The album included covers of Sugar Ray's "Fly", Cyndi Lauper's "I Drove All Night", the Staple Singers's "Stay with Us", Dolly Parton's "Falling Out of Love with Me", and a re-recording of the "Augusta" cover. The Parton cover also featured her on backing vocals. Reynolds wrote the tracks "Jar of Clay" and "The Longest Road". Contributing musicians on the album included Ricky Skaggs, Al Perkins, and former Poco member Rusty Young. Paul Worley and Mike Poole served as producers. Jack Leaver of The Grand Rapids Press rated the album three-and-a-half stars out of four, praising the cover songs in particular, as well as the use of Dobro and vocal harmony. AllMusic writer Erik Hage praised the "tight musicianship" and Reynolds's lead vocals. By year's end, Pinmonkey began to tour with Tim McGraw, Lee Ann Womack, and Brad Paisley. Additionally, the band was nominated by the Academy of Country Music for Top New Vocal Duo or Group. The only other single from the project was the cover of "I Drove All Night", which the band took to number 36 on the country chart in early 2003.

=== 2004–06: Membership changes, Big Shiny Cars, and disbanding ===
A third single for BNA, a cover of Robbie Fulks's "Let's Kill Saturday Night", peaked at number 44 on Hot Country Songs in 2004. However, BNA dropped the band for undisclosed reasons weeks after the single's release, and Schell quit soon after. In 2005, Schell released a solo album titled Salt of the Earth. Mike Crouch took over as drummer, while Chad Jeffers left to join Keith Urban's road band. The three remaining members — Crouch, Reynolds, and Michael Jeffers — were signed to a recording contract with Back Porch Records, with the album Big Shiny Cars being released in 2006. This album produced one single in "That Train Don't Run". Matraca Berg co-wrote the song, and previously reached the Hot Country Songs charts in 1997 with her rendition. Reynolds wrote three tracks on the album, while other contributing writers included Kieran Kane, Joy Lynn White, and Billy Montana. The track "Coldest Fire in Town" included Rusty Young and Elizabeth Cook on backing vocals. Also included was a cover of Kelly Willis's "Wrapped" (written by her then-husband, Bruce Robison); a year later, George Strait would have a number two hit on the country charts with his own version. Jeffrey B. Remz of Country Standard Time reviewed the album positively, praising the country rock sound and Reynolds's singing voice. Giving the album three-and-a-half stars out of five, Jonathan Keefe of Slant Magazine wrote, "the album is too stylistically scattershot to stand as a coherent statement of artistic identity, but the elements of greatness—the technical skill, the recognition of good material, the charisma—are all present to varying degrees, making Pinmonkey one of the few honest-to-God bands on Music Row worth following."

After Big Shiny Cars, the members of Pinmonkey went on to other projects. Michael Jeffers became a touring musician for Joe Nichols, and Chad Jeffers joined Carrie Underwood's touring band. Schell joined Pure Prairie League as a vocalist and drummer in 2007, but exited the band by 2012. In 2024, Michael Reynolds released a solo album titled Tarnished Nickel Sky. Writing for the blog Country Universe, Keefe called it "an album of thoughtfully composed songs that are accessible without sounding beholden to country...trends."

== Musical style ==
Pinmonkey's sound combines a number of influences. Erik Hage of AllMusic wrote that Pinmonkey "boasts a heady blend of country/Americana styles: traditional Southern gospel, Appalachian folk, Carter Family harmonizing, Muscle Shoals pop-soul, and even traces of '70s rock." Remz called Reynolds's voice "a bit smooth...and heartfelt at the same time". Leaver compared it favorably to that of Pure Prairie League vocalist Craig Fuller, a comparison also made by Billboard in their review of Speak No Evil, while Keefe found it similar to Jeff Hanna of Nitty Gritty Dirt Band. Of his singing voice, Reynolds said, "everything I sing comes out bluegrass." In a concert review, Jeffrey B. Remz of Country Standard Time thought the band was unusual for having a Dobro player instead of a lead guitarist, while also considering Reynolds's voice as strong in concert as it was on the albums. In a review of Big Shiny Cars for Country Weekly, Chris Neal described the band as having "crisp harmonies" and a "bracing country rock sound". Writing for the Detroit Free Press, Greg Crawford thought the band's sound mixed bluegrass with 1970s country rock, also highlighting Reynolds's "soulful" voice and inclusion of Dobro in the arrangements. He thought the band's sound would appeal to fans of the then-Dixie Chicks's Home. Keefe also spoke favorably of the inclusion of Dobro in the band's work.

Pinmonkey is also noted for their range of cover songs. According to Reynolds, Chad Jeffers suggested the "I Drove All Night" cover because his girlfriend at the time was a fan of Cyndi Lauper, and the band chose to listen to an acoustic recording made by Jeffers so that they could come up with a version not influenced by the original. Reynolds also said the band chose to cover Dolly Parton's "Falling Out of Love with Me" because he liked Parton's songwriting and wanted to cover one of her songs. Although he liked the song, he did not consider it suitable for Pinmonkey until Chad started singing it during a conversation. However, the band had not considered including it on the album until artists and repertoire representatives at BNA Records asked them to include a ballad. While the band's repertoire included relatively few original songs, Remz highlighted Reynolds's composition "Jar of Clay", noting that its lyrics about death showcased Pinmonkey's bluegrass influences. Keefe thought Pinmonkey's choices of cover songs were strong, particularly highlighting those of Robison and Berg, and that the original compositions "Shady Grove" and "Mountain Song" showed a newgrass influence, although he thought the range of cover song choices impacted the sequencing of Big Shiny Cars.

== Discography ==
=== Studio albums ===
| Title | Album details | Peak chart positions | | |
| Title | Album details | US | US Country | US Heat |
|---|---|---|---|---|
| Speak No Evil | Release date: February 26, 2002; Label: Drifter's Church | — | — | — |
| Pinmonkey | Release date: October 8, 2002; Label: BNA | 126 | 17 | 3 |
| Big Shiny Cars | Release date: March 7, 2006; Label: Back Porch | — | — | — |
"—" denotes releases that did not chart

=== Singles ===
| Year | Single | Peak positions | Album |
| Year | Single | US Country | Album |
|---|---|---|---|
| 2002 | "Barbed Wire and Roses" | 25 | Pinmonkey |
| 2003 | "I Drove All Night" | 36 | Pinmonkey |
| 2004 | "Let's Kill Saturday Night" | 44 | —N/a |
| 2006 | "That Train Don't Run" | — | Big Shiny Cars |
"—" denotes releases that did not chart

=== Music videos ===
| Year | Video |
|---|---|
| 2002 | "Barbed Wire and Roses" |
| 2006 | "That Train Don't Run" |

== Awards and nominations ==
| Year | Organization | Award | Nominee/Work | Result |
|---|---|---|---|---|
| 2003 | Academy of Country Music Awards | Top New Vocal Group or Duet | Pinmonkey | Nominated |
