= The Best Remixes =

EP by Cyndi Lauper
- Released: April 21, 1989
- Recorded: 1983–1989
- Genres: Dance; pop
- Length: 38:57
- Label: Epic
- Producer: Cyndi Lauper

Cyndi Lauper chronology
True Colors (1986)	The Best Remixes (1989)	A Night to Remember (1989)

The Best Remixes is an extended play (EP) released by American singer Cyndi Lauper in 1989 on Epic/CBS Records, and re-released in 1996 on Epic/Sony Records. It was released exclusively in Japan and compiles six remixes of her top selling singles. It came in a regular jewel case with Japanese lyrics printed inside and peaked at 61 on the Japanese charts. The EP was given a worldwide release in October 2023 via streaming and digital download.

== Track listing ==
1. "Girls Just Want to Have Fun" (extended version) – 6:08
2. "She Bop" (Special Dance Mix) – 6:27
3. "Good Enough" (Dance Remix) – 5:27
4. "Change of Heart" (extended version) – 7:55
5. "What's Going On?" (club version) – 6:33
6. "Money Changes Everything" (extended live version) – 6:25

== Charts ==
Chart (1989)	Peak position
Japanese Albums (Oricon)	61

== Certifications ==
Region	Certification	Certified units/sales
Japan (RIAJ)	Gold	100,000^{^}
^{^} Shipments figures based on certification alone.

== Release history ==
Country	Date	Format	Label	Catalog
Japan	21 April 1989	CD	Epic (CBS)	20.8P-5224
Japan	1 December 1996	CD	Epic (Sony)	ESCA 6628
Worldwide	October 2023	Download/Streaming	Epic	–
