= A Night to Remember (Cyndi Lauper song) =

Single by Cyndi Lauper

from the album A Night To Remember
- B-side: "Insecurious"
- Released: October 16, 1989
- Recorded: 1989
- Studio: The Hit Factory (New York, NY)
- Genre: Soft rock
- Label: Epic
- Songwriters: Cyndi Lauper; Franke Previte; D. Micale
- Producers: Cyndi Lauper; Lennie Petze

Cyndi Lauper singles chronology
"Heading West" (1989)	"A Night to Remember" (1989)	"Primitive" (1990)

Music video
- "A Night To Remember" on YouTube

"A Night to Remember" was the third single released in North America and Australia from the album of the same name by Cyndi Lauper. It was not released as a single in Europe.

A music video was made of the song. It featured shots of Lauper on stage performing the song with her band as well as shots of Lauper on the beach.

The song is about a break-up where the heartbroken protagonist reminisces about a romantic affair with a departed lover.

== Chart performance ==
Chart (1989)	Peak position
Australia (ARIA)	145

== Track listing ==
- Australian 7" / US Cassette
- A. "A Night To Remember" (Eric Thorngren Remix) – 3:43
- B. "Insecurious" – 3:30

The Single Remix features new re-recorded vocals.
