= List of number-one singles of 2003 (Canada) =

The following lists the number one best-selling singles in Canada in 2003 which was published in Billboard magazine under the Hits of the World section. Only songs released as physical singles qualified for this chart during this time. During this period, the singles market in Canada was very limited in both scope and availability and, in many cases, these songs received little or no radio support. For tracks other than those by American Idol or Canadian Idol winners, sales were likely to be less than 1,000 per week. Nevertheless, this was the only singles chart Canadians had until June 2007, when the Canadian Hot 100 was released to the public. It also lists other big hits in the sales chart.

Note that Billboard publishes charts with an issue date approximately 7–10 days in advance.

== Chart history ==
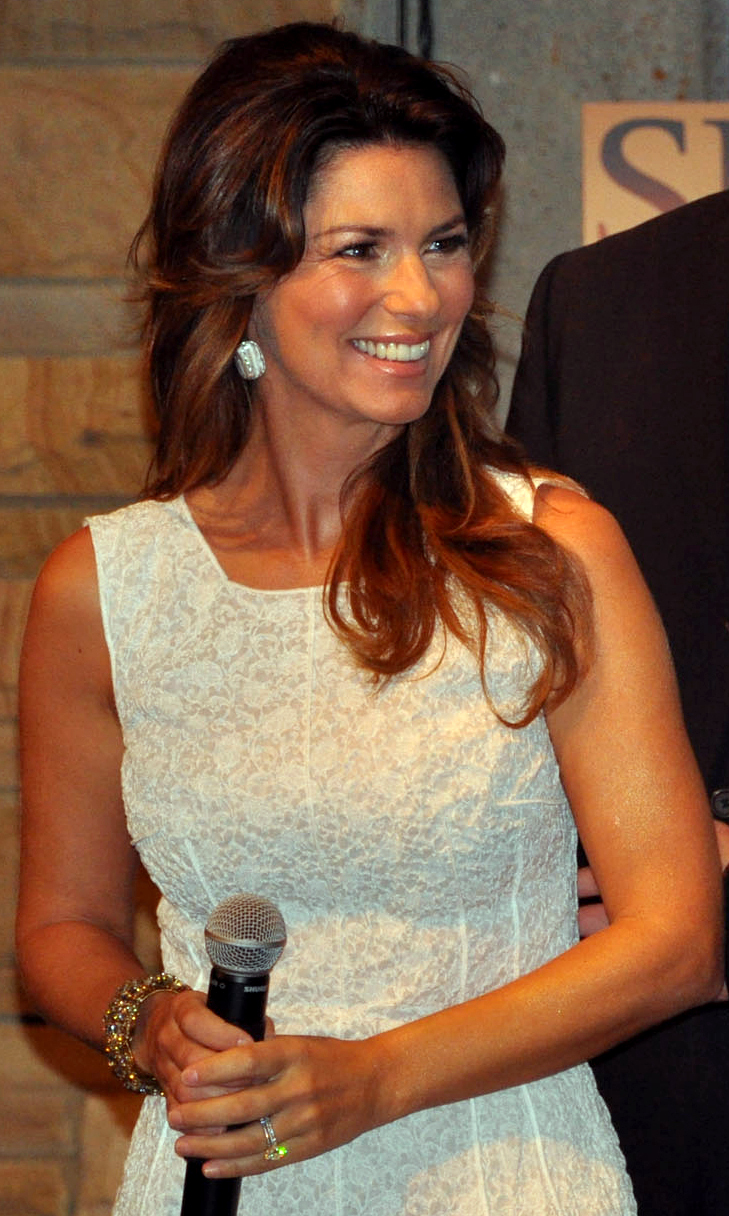
Shania Twain had her first and only number-one in Canada to date with "I'm Gonna Getcha Good!" in January.

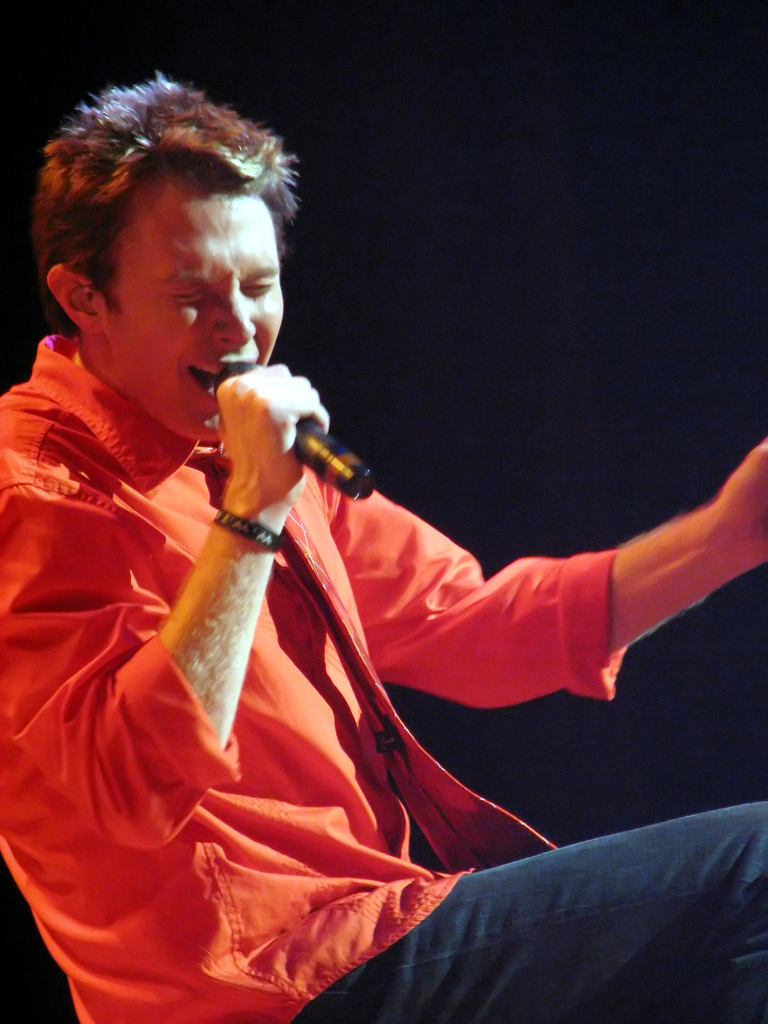
American Idol runner-up Clay Aiken's "Bridge over Troubled Water" / "This Is the Night" spent 13 weeks at number-one in mid-2003.

Issue date	Song	Artist(s)	Ref.
January 4	"I'm Gonna Getcha Good!"	Shania Twain	
January 11	"Jenny from the Block"	Jennifer Lopez featuring Jadakiss and Styles	
January 18	"Die Another Day"	Madonna	
January 25	"Jenny from the Block"	Jennifer Lopez featuring Jadakiss and Styles	
February 1	"Die Another Day"	Madonna	
February 8	"Jenny from the Block"	Jennifer Lopez featuring Jadakiss and Styles	
February 15	"Jenny from the Block"	Jennifer Lopez featuring Jadakiss and Styles	
February 22	"The Ketchup Song"	Las Ketchup	
March 1	"The Ketchup Song"	Las Ketchup	
March 8	"The Ketchup Song"	Las Ketchup	
March 15	"Beautiful"	Christina Aguilera	
March 22	"I Drove All Night"	Celine Dion	
March 29	"I Drove All Night"	Celine Dion	
April 5	"I Drove All Night"	Celine Dion	
April 12	"I Drove All Night"	Celine Dion	
April 19	"I Drove All Night"	Celine Dion	
April 26	"American Life"	Madonna	
May 3	"American Life"	Madonna	
May 10	"In da Club"	50 Cent	
May 17	"In da Club"	50 Cent	
May 24	"In da Club"	50 Cent	
May 31	"In da Club"	50 Cent	
June 7	"In da Club"	50 Cent	
June 14	"There There"	Radiohead	
June 21	"There There"	Radiohead	
June 28	"Bridge over Troubled Water" / "This Is the Night"	Clay Aiken	
July 5	"Bridge over Troubled Water" / "This Is the Night"	Clay Aiken	
July 12	"Bridge over Troubled Water" / "This Is the Night"	Clay Aiken	
July 19	"Bridge over Troubled Water" / "This Is the Night"	Clay Aiken	
July 26	"Bridge over Troubled Water" / "This Is the Night"	Clay Aiken	
August 2	"Bridge over Troubled Water" / "This Is the Night"	Clay Aiken	
August 9	"Bridge over Troubled Water" / "This Is the Night"	Clay Aiken	
August 16	"Bridge over Troubled Water" / "This Is the Night"	Clay Aiken	
August 23	"Bridge over Troubled Water" / "This Is the Night"	Clay Aiken	
August 30	"Bridge over Troubled Water" / "This Is the Night"	Clay Aiken	
September 6	"Bridge over Troubled Water" / "This Is the Night"	Clay Aiken	
September 13	"Bridge over Troubled Water" / "This Is the Night"	Clay Aiken	
September 20	"Bridge over Troubled Water" / "This Is the Night"	Clay Aiken	
September 27	"Someday"	Nickelback	
October 4	"Someday"	Nickelback	
October 11	"Someday"	Nickelback	
October 18	"Something More"	Ryan Malcolm	
October 25	"Something More"	Ryan Malcolm	
November 1	"Something More"	Ryan Malcolm	
November 8	"Something More"	Ryan Malcolm	
November 15	"Something More"	Ryan Malcolm	
November 22	"Something More"	Ryan Malcolm	
November 29	"Something More"	Ryan Malcolm	
December 6	"Something More"	Ryan Malcolm	
December 13	"Something More"	Ryan Malcolm	
December 20	"Something More"	Ryan Malcolm	
December 27	"Something More"	Ryan Malcolm	
