= Where I Stand (George Ducas album) =

Studio album by George Ducas
- Released: January 14, 1997
- Length: 37:29
- Label: Capitol Nashville
- Producer: Nancy Williams; Richard Bennett

George Ducas chronology
George Ducas (1995)	Where I Stand (1997)

Where I Stand is the second studio album by American country music singer George Ducas. It was released in January 1997 on Capitol Records Nashville. The album includes the singles "Every Time She Passes By" and "Long Trail of Tears," which respectively reached No. 57 and No. 55 on the U.S. Billboard country singles charts.

== Track listing ==
1. "Every Time She Passes By" (George Ducas, Michael P. Heeney) – 3:30
2. "Long Trail of Tears" (Ducas, Heeney) – 2:59
3. "I'm Pretending" (Buddy Miller, Julie Miller) – 3:27
4. "You're Only My Everything" (Ducas, Heeney) – 3:51
5. "You Could've Fooled Me" (Tommy Lee James, Dennis Morgan) – 4:08
6. "Tricky Moon" (Ducas, Tia Sillers) – 3:27
7. "Stay the Night" (Ducas, Sillers) – 4:20
8. "The Invisible Man" (Ducas, Heeney) – 4:37
9. "Heartaches and Dreams" (Ducas, Kostas) – 3:09
10. "I'd Be Lying" (Rick Bowles, Josh Leo, Terry McBride) – 4:01

== Personnel ==
- Richard Bennett – acoustic guitar, electric guitar, keyboards, piano, tambourine
- George Ducas – acoustic guitar, lead vocals, backing vocals
- Dan Dugmore – acoustic guitar, steel guitar
- Steve Ebe – drums
- Vince Gill – backing vocals
- Tony Harrell – keyboards, piano
- Troy Von Hoefen – acoustic guitar
- Frank Lawrence (Hussar) backing vocals
- Tommy Lee James – backing vocals
- Bill Lloyd – electric guitar
- Jerry Dale McFadden – keyboards, piano
- Buddy Miller – acoustic guitar
- Greg Morrow – drums, tambourine
- Al Perkins – steel guitar
- Kim Richey – backing vocals
- Hank Singer – fiddle
- Harry Stinson – backing vocals
- Billy Thomas – backing vocals
- Glenn Worf – bass guitar
