= Lipstick Promises =

Single by George Ducas

from the album George Ducas
- Released: November 28, 1994
- Genre: Country
- Length: 4:04
- Label: Liberty
- Songwriters: George Ducas; Tia Sillers
- Producer: Richard Bennett

George Ducas singles chronology
"Teardrops" (1994)	"Lipstick Promises" (1994)	"Hello Cruel World" (1995)

"Lipstick Promises" is a song co-written and recorded by American country music artist George Ducas. It was released in November 1994 as the second single from his debut album George Ducas. The song reached number 9 on the Billboard Hot Country Singles & Tracks chart in April 1995. Ducas wrote this song with Tia Sillers. Ducas released a new version of the song in 2020.

== Critical reception ==
Bill Hobbs of the Tampa Bay Times, in his review of the album, considered the track the strongest song. He compared its sound favorably to that of Roy Orbison.

== Music videos ==
The original music video was directed by Piers Plowdon and premiered in late 1994. It was filmed in Los Angeles, California.

The 25th anniversary version was filmed in Elliston Street neighborhood of Nashville that included the digital addition of the former Amy's (called The End in 2020), one of the bars where Ducas first performed while trying to make a name for himself. The song also incorporates clips from the original video.

== Chart performance ==
"Lipstick Promises" debuted at number 75 on the U.S. Billboard Hot Country Singles & Tracks for the week of December 10, 1994.

Chart (1994–1995)	Peak position
Canada Country Singles (RPM)	6
US Hot Country Songs (Billboard)	9

=== Year-end charts ===
Chart (1995)	Position
Canada Country Tracks (RPM)	68
