= Teardrops (George Ducas song) =

1994 single by George Ducas

Single by George Ducas

from the album George Ducas
- B-side: "Waiting and Wishing"
- Released: September 10, 1994
- Genre: Country
- Length: 3:03
- Label: Liberty
- Songwriter(s): George Ducas, Terry McBride
- Producer(s): Richard Bennett

George Ducas singles chronology
"Teardrops" (1994)	"Lipstick Promises" (1994)

"Teardrops" is a song co-written and recorded by American country music artist George Ducas. t was released in September 1994 as the first single from his debut album George Ducas. The song reached #38 on the Billboard Hot Country Singles & Tracks chart. The song was written by Ducas and Terry McBride, whose band, McBride & the Ride, previously recorded it on their 1994 album Terry McBride & the Ride.

== Chart performance ==
Chart (1994)	Peak position
US Hot Country Songs (Billboard)	38
