= American Life (song) =

2003 single by Madonna

Single by Madonna

from the album American Life
- B-side: "Die Another Day"
- Released: March 22, 2003
- Recorded: 2002
- Studio: Olympic (Barnes, London)
- Genre: Experimental pop; folktronica
- Length: 4:57
- Label: Maverick; Warner Bros.
- Songwriters: Madonna; Mirwais Ahmadzaï
- Producers: Madonna; Mirwais Ahmadzaï

Madonna singles chronology
"Die Another Day" (2002)	"American Life" (2003)	"Hollywood" (2003)

Music videos
- "American Life" on YouTube; "American Life" (Director's cut) on YouTube

"American Life" is a song by American singer Madonna from her ninth studio album of the same name (2003), co-written and produced with Mirwais Ahmadzaï. An experimental folktronica track, it critiques the so-called American Dream during the presidency of George W. Bush and reflects on Madonna's own past materialism, featuring a polarizing rap section. Released as the album's lead single on March 22, 2003, it initially received harsh reviews—Blender ranked it among the worst songs of all time—but has since been reassessed as a bold and underrated statement.

Commercially, the song broke ground as the first to enter Billboard's Hot Singles Sales chart from internet sales alone, peaking at No. 37 on the Hot 100, and topping the Dance Club Play chart. In the UK, it reached No. 2 and landed in the top 10 across several European markets. Official remixes came from Felix da Housecat, Missy Elliott, Paul Oakenfold, and Peter Rauhofer.

The Jonas Åkerlund–directed music video originally featured a satirical military fashion show and a grenade tossed at a Bush look-alike. Amid controversy over perceived anti-Bush imagery and the Iraq invasion, Madonna withdrew the original, releasing a toned-down flag-filled performance version instead. The singer performed "American Life" on her Re-Invention (2004) and Madame X (2019–2020) concert tours, as well as during promotional appearances for the album in 2003, her 2016 Tears of a Clown show in Miami, and during her set at Stonewall 50 – WorldPride NYC 2019.

== Background and development ==
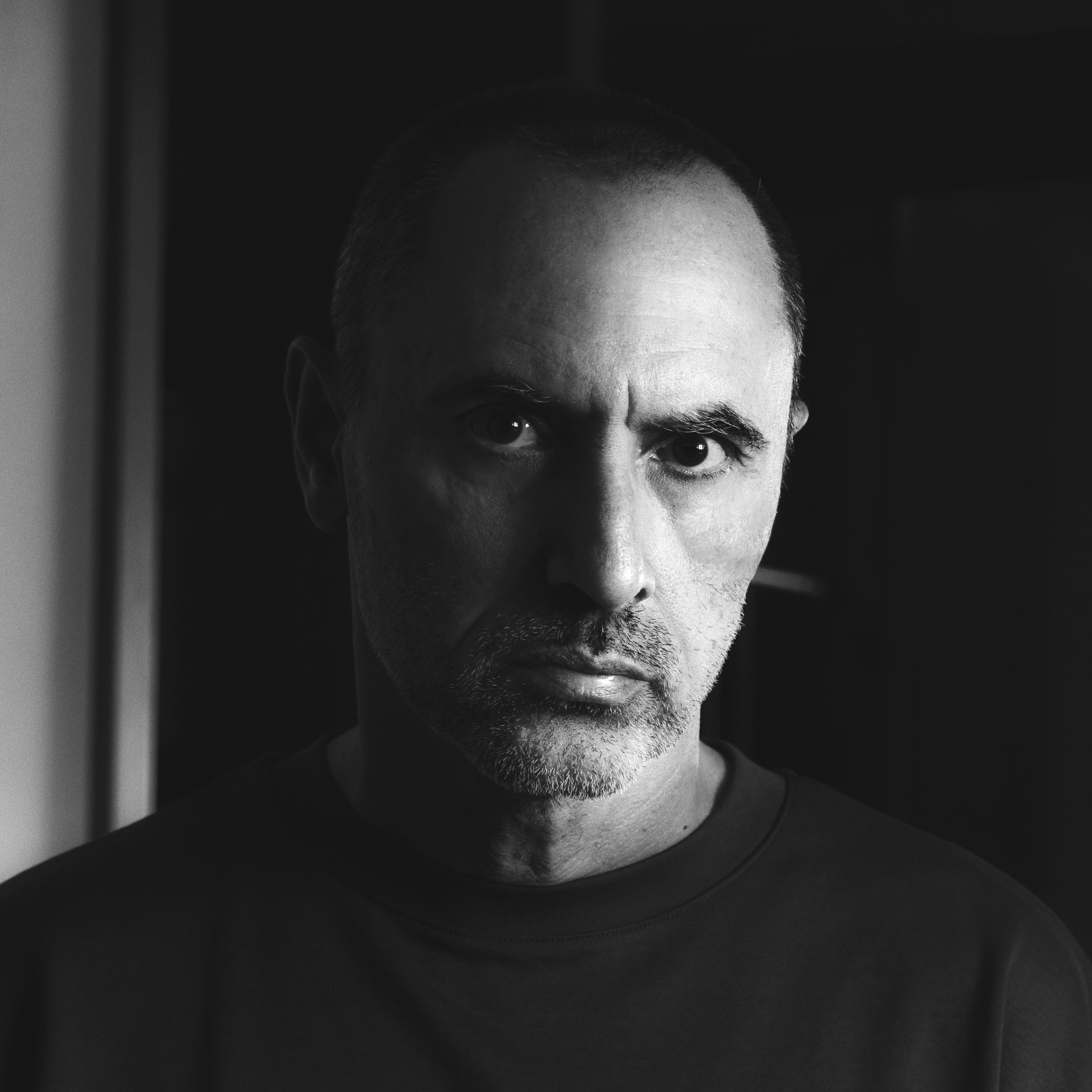
Mirwais Ahmadzaï worked with Madonna on the song.

After completing her Drowned World Tour (2001) and in the wake of the September 11 attacks, Madonna began work on her ninth studio album, American Life, with French producer Mirwais Ahmadzaï, her collaborator on her previous album, Music (2000). The events of 9/11 prompted a period of introspection in which she questioned American culture and the ideals of the American Dream. Feeling "let down" by the country's priorities, she reflected critically on her past focus on fame, wealth, and superficiality, later admitting to NBC News' Matt Lauer that she had once been entirely self-absorbed and unconcerned with the wider world; "I didn't really give a shit [...] I just didn't. I just wanted to focus on me, me, me, my career, my life, just me".

By late 2002, recording sessions were nearly complete. Retaining the "cyber folk" style of Music, the album explored weightier themes, including American society, the death of Madonna's mother, her marriage to British filmmaker Guy Ritchie, and the emptiness of celebrity —the very image she had long embodied. For the title track, she drew on her own career and personal evolution, questioning the value of her past ambitions and recognizing that what truly matters is rarely tied to status or appearance.

The song began as a demo titled "Modern Life", with Ahmadzaï crafting its first verse and refrain. Over the course of 18 months, the pair developed it through an organic process, often sparked by guitar lessons or rough instrumental sketches Ahmadzaï would send her.

== Recording and composition ==
Written and produced by Madonna and Mirwais Ahmadzaï, "American Life" was recorded at London's Olympic Studios, along with the rest of the album. Mastering was handled by Mark "Spike" Stent and Tim Young. Ahmadzaï encouraged Madonna to add a rap section, suggesting she improvise in a stream-of-consciousness style. Drawing on everyday details —drinking soy lattes, driving her Mini Cooper to the studio —she recorded the part on the spot. Ahmadzaï envisioned it as stiff and robotic, a parody of early-2000s music clichés.

Musically, the track is an experimental folktronica song in the key of A major, set in common time at 102 beats per minute. Its chord progressions shift between F♯m–F♯m_{5}–C♯–Bm in the verses and F♯m–C♯m–C♯m_{2}–Bm–Bm_{2} in the refrain. Built around a "punchy" octave synth line, acoustic guitar riff, and multitracked "little-girl" vocals, the arrangement blends pathos with satire. Lyrically, Madonna critiques modern superficiality, the Bush-era American Dream, and her own past pursuit of fame, wealth, and validation, declaring that such approval is "not a goal to have in life".

The song opens a capella, with Madonna questioning whether she should become famous —or lose weight— before the synths kick in and a drum loop plays in the background. From there, Madonna begins reflecting on her career ambitions and disillusionment. On the refrain, she pointedly laments living the "American Dream". At the three-minute mark, the rap catalogs her luxuries —yoga, Pilates, a jet pilot, multiple staff— only to admit lingering dissatisfaction, culminating in the exclamation, "Ahh, fuck it!"

== Release and remixes ==
"American Life" was released as the lead single from the parent album on March 22, 2003, with digital purchases available through Madonna's website for $1.49. Originally scheduled for delivery two days later, downloads were sent out on March 23 following an online leak. CD and 7-inch formats were issued in Australia and most of Europe on April 7, and in the United States the next day. (Note: See sources cited on "Weekly charts" section) The single was added to digital platforms Liquid Audio, RioPort, and Madonna's website on April 12, while twelve-inch and CD maxi formats were released on April 29.

Official remixes were created by Felix da Housecat, Missy Elliott, Paul Oakenfold, and Peter Rauhofer. Billboard's Michael Paoletta praised Felix and Elliott's versions, citing "Erasure-hued synth patterns", "Strafe-inflected percussion", and Elliott's "salacious ad-libs" with guest vocals from Tweet. Rauhofer's mix leaned toward progressive house, while Oakenfold's incorporated downtempo beats, cinematic flourishes, and alternative rock nuances. Felix's Devin Dazzle Club Mix "softens the edges" of the original by heavily relying on the line modern life is not for me, and was included on Finally Enough Love: 50 Number Ones (2022), Madonna's third remix album. Additional versions included a metal-inspired "Headcleanr Rock Mix" featured on Madonna's second remix album, Remixed & Revisited (2003).

== Critical reception ==
Upon release, "American Life" received predominantly negative reviews. Music Week offered rare praise, naming it one of the album's best tracks, but most critics panned it. Slant Magazine's Sal Cinquemani called it "trite, self-aggrandizing, often awkward [...] dour and robotic", while Stylus Magazine's Ed Howard found it hypocritical for a wealthy celebrity to decry the very privilege she enjoyed. Ken Tucker from Entertainment Weekly dismissed it as a "facile confirmation of [Madonna's] haters' most knee-jerk conviction: that [she] does not have a worldview beyond her next Pilates appointment", while The Guardian's Alexis Petridis mocked its "extreme point of view" as little more than "money can't buy you happiness". Stephen Thompson from The A.V. Club referred to "American Life" as "kittery, tuneless, and shallow to the point of self-parody", and Billboard's Chuck Taylor criticized its overreliance on electronic blips, noting the novelty had worn thin. Jon O'Brien, also from Billboard, said it felt like a leftover from Music.

The rap drew particular scorn. Thompson likened it to a "Weird Al" Yankovic parody, Taylor deemed it "soulless [and] positively atrocious", and Instinct's Samuel R. Murrian compared it to chalkboard scraping. NME's Johnny Davis called it a failed attempt at self-deprecation, while Blender staff declared it "the most embarrassing rap ever recorded", ranking the track ninth on their "50 Worst Songs Ever" list. Rolling Stone's Ben Ratliff found it embarrassing yet honest, and GQ India listed Madonna among the worst rappers of all time. Taylor quipped: "Madonna rapping? She really shouldn't have. Really. But that’s just one of the missteps sabotaging [her] new single, a blurry snarl of style and composition that sounds more like a disjointed medley than a song. […] This 'American Life' should be hastily deported".

In later years, retrospective reviews became more favorable. Paul Schrodt of Slant Magazine praised it as a "gutsy lead single" despite its infamous rap, while Joe Lynch called it "one of the most fascinating detours in pop-diva history", even finding the rap "strangely magnetic" when taken as kitsch. Gay Times writers Sam Damshenas and Daniel Megarry noted that the "once-unforgivable" rap had gained "iconic status", and The Guardian's Jude Rogers labeled it "genuinely interesting". Nayer Missim of PinkNews viewed it as "wilfully experimental", capturing both the strengths and weaknesses of its parent album, and HuffPost's Matthew Jacobs deemed it underrated.

== Commercial performance ==
In the US, "American Life" debuted at No. 4 on Billboard's Hot Singles Sales chart the week of March 22, 2003, with 4,000 paid downloads —becoming the first song to chart based solely on internet sales. After two days of airplay, it entered the Hot 100 at No. 90 on April 5, and, with continued downloads, 11,000 physical sales, and 23 million radio impressions, jumped to a peak of No. 37 less than a month later. The remixes topped both the Dance Club Play and Dance Singles Sales charts, giving Madonna her 29th No. 1 on Dance Club Play —a record for any artist— and her second appearance on the Hot Latin Tracks chart, following "You'll See" (1995). It ranked No. 36 on the year-end Dance Club Songs chart and No. 8 on the year-end Dance Singles Sales chart, and also reached No. 1 in Canada.

In the United Kingdom, the single debuted at number 57, based on imports alone. After the official release a week later, "American Life" peaked at No. 2 in the UK Singles Chart with first-week sales of 30,000 copies, held off the top by Room 5's "Make Luv", and was the country's 100th best-selling single of 2003, with 72,260 copies sold by 2008. Across Europe, it reached the top three in Italy, Portugal, Scotland, Spain, Sweden, and Switzerland, and the top ten in Austria, Belgium (Flanders), France, and Germany. In France, single was certified Silver by France's Syndicat National de l'Édition Phonographique (SNEP) for shipping of 250,000 copies, and peaked at No. 2 on the European Hot 100 Singles chart. In Australia, it debuted and peaked at No. 7 and earned a Gold certification by the Australian Recording Industry Association (ARIA), while in New Zealand it reached No. 33 for a single week.

== Music video ==
=== Background and development ===
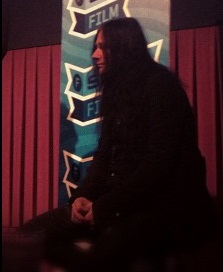
Jonas Åkerlund directed the music video for "American Life".

The music video for "American Life" was directed by Jonas Åkerlund—who had previously worked with Madonna on "Ray of Light" (1998) and "Music" (2000)—and filmed at the Los Angeles Center Studios in early February 2003. Produced by Nicola Doring with wardrobe by Arianne Phillips and choreography by Jamie King, it was conceived during the lead-up to the Iraq War as a "mini movie" with anti-war and anti-fashion themes. Åkerlund and Madonna intended to provoke discussion, using a war-themed fashion show to highlight the absurdity of conflict, the elitism of high fashion, her opposition to the Bush administration, the superficiality of materialism, and the flaws in conventional beauty ideals.

Pre-production began in January at Maverick's offices, where Madonna presented the concept to the crew. Casting sought models embodying everyday American archetypes, soldiers, and pin-up girls, as well as "fierce", diverse female dancers to portray her troupe. Celebrity look-alikes were hired for Donatella Versace, Anna Wintour, Jack Nicholson, Paris and Nicky Hilton, then president of the United States George W. Bush, and Muammar Gaddafi. Designer Jeremy Scott created the runway outfits, while Madonna wore two primary looks: a U.S. Woodland camouflage ensemble with leather bondage pieces, and an Army-inspired suit by Stella McCartney.

Filmed over three days under tight security to prevent leaks, the production was described by Åkerlund as "ambitious". Multiple endings were shot, all featuring Madonna tossing a grenade. The released version shows the Bush double lighting a cigar with it; others included the grenade exploding on the catwalk or Bush sharing a cigar and kiss with a Saddam Hussein look-alike. The original cut allegedly ran over ten minutes with extended scenes, car chases, and dialogue, but was edited down to maintain entertainment value and provoke thought without compromising Madonna's artistic intent.

=== Synopsis ===
Screenshot of the original "American Life" video showing Madonna crashing the runway in a Mini Cooper.

The video opens with soldiers preparing for battle, intercut with Madonna performing on screens above a cross-shaped runway. Backstage, models in haute-couture military attire are rushed onto the runway by a designer (played by Scott). The models are accessorized with weapons and slogans like "Fashion Victim". One wears a thong with the upper half of a translucent camouflage burqa. As the models walk, a child draped in ammunition and veiled women also appear on the runway, while Madonna carves "Protect Me" into a bathroom stall before joining her female troupe to execute militant-style choreography.

The group piles into a camouflage Mini Cooper with the license plate "Hell on Wheels" and drives through a wall, crashing the fashion show. Madonna emerges, tossing a soy latte and sliding down the hood, then turns a hose on paparazzi and celebrity spectators. The show descends into chaos, blending staged and real war footage: injured soldiers, bombings, displaced civilians, and a woman in flames running the runway. Explosions send bodies flying as the violence escalates. In the climax, Madonna drives into the crowd, pulls a grenade pin with her teeth, and hurls it toward the audience while laughing. It is caught by a man resembling George W. Bush, who calmly uses it to light a cigar.

=== Release and reception ===
"American Life" was scheduled to premiere on April 4, 2003, on MuchMusic and VH1. A February 9 press release described it as the "most shocking anti-war, anti-Bush statement yet to come from the showbusiness industry", portraying the horrors and repercussions of war. Critics quickly accused Madonna of being "un-American", prompting her to clarify she was "pro-peace" and critical of how many define being American, not "anti-Bush" or "pro-Iraq".

On April 1, three days before release, Madonna announced she would pull the video, noting it had been filmed before the Iraq War began and was "not appropriate to air at this time". She said she did not want to risk misinterpretation. The decision drew criticism from Alexis Petridis, Salon's Heather Havrilesky, and Colombian singer Shakira, who expected "more backbone" from Madonna. Havrilesky, while faulting the withdrawal, also argued the video was not truly shocking given that images of war already filled the news, and Petridis felt that "a lot of fuss [was] made over nothing". Director Jonas Åkerlund, initially opposed to the move, later said he understood her reasoning after visiting the US. The video still aired in parts of Europe, and although there were talks of a commercial release in the US, it never materialized. Years later, Madonna told El País she acted out of concern for her children's safety and the potential impact on husband Guy Ritchie's career. She also rejected speculation that the backlash faced by the Dixie Chicks following their remarks about Bush had influenced her choice. Sal Cinquemani would later call it "the first time in [Madonna's] career where she voluntarily self-censored her work", adding that the backlash it might have provoked would have eclipsed the controversy of her Sex book, and praising it as a "startling comment on the obscenity of war and materialism" that should be remembered as brave.

A "drastically edited" alternate version premiered on April 16 in the US after a VH1 special titled Madonna Speaks. It featured Madonna in the Stella McCartney suit performing against a backdrop of shifting flags and was assembled in just two days to maintain momentum. Åkerlund admitted it was "not terribly impressive on its own". Matthew Rettenmund criticized the replacement of her "most daring" video with "one of her worst", while news.com.au's Nick Bond called it "boring", and Rolling Stone's Gary Grimes described it as uncharacteristically simple.

The original video remained unreleased in the US until April 27, 2023, when Madonna uploaded a 4k remastered "Director's Cut" to her YouTube channel to commemorate the American Life album's 20th anniversary and ahead of her retrospective Celebration Tour. The new release omitted the Bush grenade ending. Slant Magazine ranked "American Life" the 19th best video of the 2000s for its indictment of early Iraq War "groupthink". It later placed at No. 22 on Slant's list of Madonna's greatest videos, and was named among her most controversial by Billboard and HuffPost. TheBacklot.com's Louis Virtel ranked it 32nd in her videography, calling it "bad-ass".

== Live performances ==
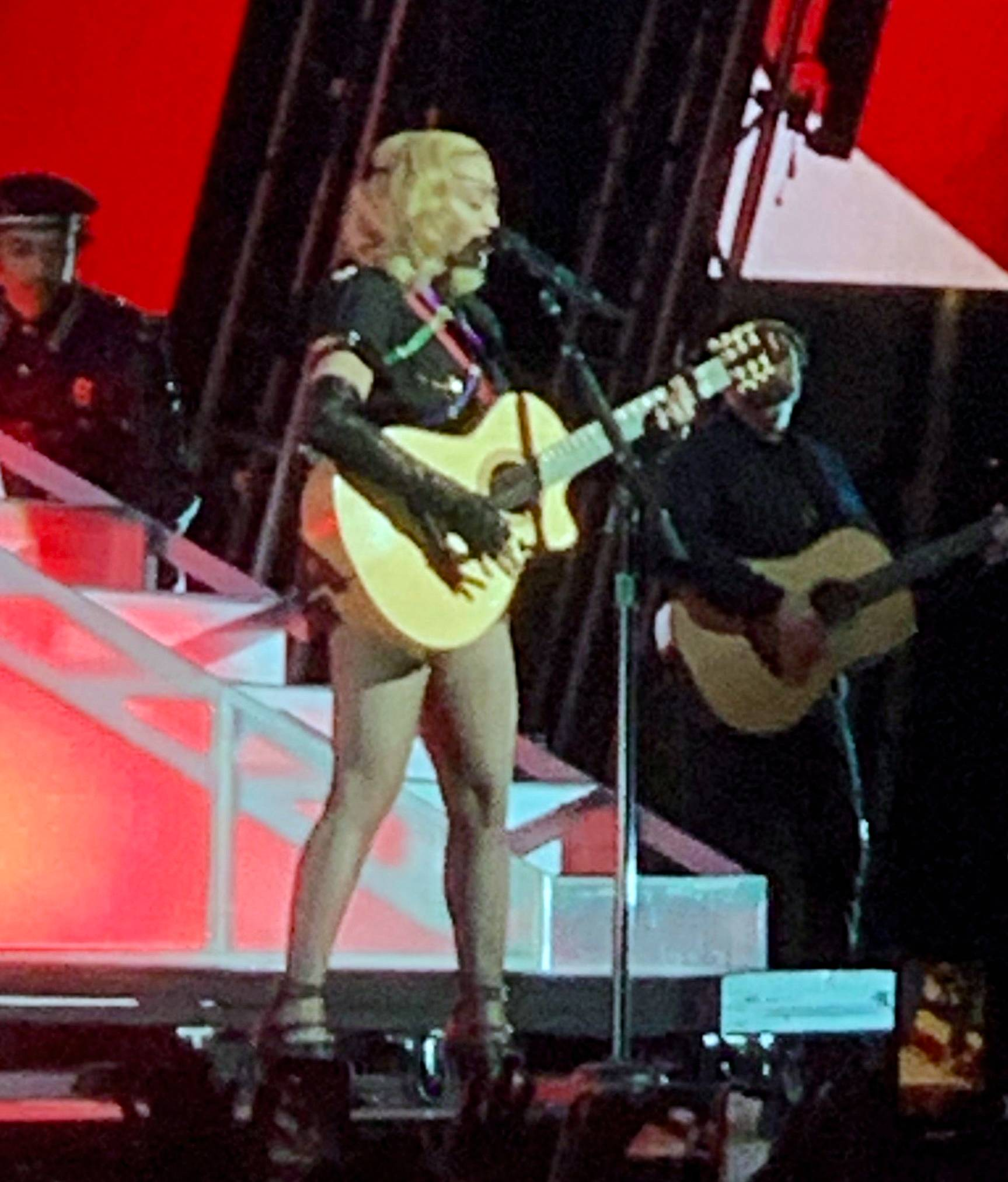
Madonna performing "American Life" on guitar during her set at Stonewall 50 – WorldPride NYC 2019.

On April 22, 2003, Madonna performed "American Life" on the MTV special On Stage & On the Record. The next day, she appeared at New York's Tower Records for both an acoustic and full arrangement of the song. In May, she sang it at London's HMV store, on BBC One's Friday Night with Jonathan Ross, and Top of the Pops. She also performed it at a private concert at Paris' Cantine du Faubourg.

The song's performance on the Re-Invention World Tour (2004) opened with the sound of bombs dropping and video backdrops of helicopters, destroyed villages, and war-affected children. Dancers dressed as soldiers crawled and did push-ups as Madonna emerged atop a stack of television sets in military fatigues and a black beret. The number depicted soldiers confronting religious figures such as a pregnant nun and a rabbi, men in cages, and featured the original music video —Bush and Hussein ending included— on giant screens. At one point, Madonna and her dancers strode down a V-shaped catwalk that descended from the ceiling into the audience. Yahoo! News' Angela Pacienza described her "button-pusher attitude" on full display, while the Toronto Sun's Jane Stevenson called it the night's "biggest production". A recording of the performance appeared on Madonna's first live album, I'm Going to Tell You a Secret (2006).

On October 15, 2008, during the Sticky & Sweet Tour in Boston, Madonna performed an a cappella rendition of "American Life" per the crowd's request. In 2016, she revived the track for her Tears of a Clown show in Miami, wearing a pink clown costume and delivering a political monologue criticizing Donald Trump, commenting on that year's elections, Native Americans struggles, and the Dakota Access Pipeline protests, saying she felt "ashamed to be an American".

Madonna next performed a guitar-led version of the song at Stonewall 50 – WorldPride NYC 2019, dressed in a black leather jacket and eye patch, flanked by dancers dressed as spies. Billboard's Joel Lynch wrote that its message had grown "more timely" since its release. A similar staging appeared on the Madame X Tour (2019–2020), with soldiers dragging a flag-covered coffin and torn uniforms falling from above. Las Vegas Weekly's Josh Bell praised its thematic fit, while Paper magazine's Bradley Stern described it as a scaled-down version of the Re-Invention performance. The number was included on both the film that chronicled the tour and its accompanying live album.

== Formats and track listings ==
- European CD single
1. "American Life" (Radio Edit) – 4:27
2. "American Life" (Oakenfold Downtempo Remix) – 5:32
3. "American Life" (Felix da Housecat's Devin Dazzle Club Mix) – 6:10
- US Maxi-single; UK promotional CD single
1. "American Life" (Missy Elliott American Dream Mix) – 4:42
2. "American Life" (Oakenfold Downtempo Remix) – 5:31
3. "American Life" (Felix da Housecat's Devin Dazzle Club Mix) – 6:10
4. "American Life" (Peter Rauhofer's American Anthem Pt. 1) – 10:44
5. "American Life" (Peter Rauhofer's American Anthem Pt. 2) – 9:08
6. "Die Another Day" (Richard 'Humpty' Vission Electrofried Mix) – 6:02
- US promotional CD single
1. "American Life" (Missy Elliott American Dream Clean Edit) – 4:36
2. "American Life" (Missy Elliott American Dream Remix) – 4:40
3. "American Life" (Missy Elliott Missy Elliott American Dream Instrumental Remix) – 4:33
- US 7-inch single
1. "American Life" (Radio Edit) – 4:27
2. "Die Another Day" (Richard 'Humpty' Vission Radio Edit) – 3:36
- European 2×12-inch vinyl (Remixes)
1. "American Life" (Missy Elliott American Dream Remix) – 4:49
2. "American Life" (Oakenfold Downtempo Remix) – 5:32
3. "American Life" (Peter Rauhofer's American Anthem Pt. 1) – 10:41
4. "American Life" (Felix da Housecat's Devin Dazzle Club Mix) – 6:10
5. "Die Another Day" (Calderone & Quayle Afterlife Mix) – 8:52
6. "American Life" (Peter Rauhofer's American Anthem Pt. 2) – 9:06
- Digital single
1. "American Life" – 4:27
- Digital EP
1. "American Life" – 4:27
2. "American Life" (Missy Elliott American Dream Mix) – 4:49
3. "American Life" (Oakenfold Downtempo Remix) – 5:32
4. "American Life" (Felix da Housecat's Devin Dazzle Club Mix) – 6:10
5. "American Life" (Peter Rauhofer's American Anthem Pt. 1) – 10:41
6. "American Life" (Peter Rauhofer's American Anthem Pt. 2) – 9:06
7. "Die Another Day" (Richard 'Humpty' Vission Electrofried Mix) – 6:01
8. "Die Another Day" (Calderone & Quayle Afterlife Mix) – 8:52

== Credits and personnel ==
Credits adapted from the liner notes of the American Life album.

- Madonna – songwriter, producer
- Mirwais Ahmadzaï – songwriter, programming, guitar
- Mike "Spike" Stent – mixing
- Tim Young – mastering
- Tom Hannen – assistant engineer
- Simon Changer – assistant engineer

== Charts ==
=== Weekly charts ===
Weekly chart performance for "American Life"
Chart (2003)	Peak position
Australia (ARIA)	7
Australian Dance (ARIA)	1
Austria (Ö3 Austria Top 40)	7
Belgium (Ultratop 50 Flanders)	10
Belgium (Ultratop 50 Wallonia)	12
Canada (Nielsen SoundScan)	1
Croatia (HRT)	2
Czech Republic (ČNS IFPI)	5
Denmark (Tracklisten)	1
European Hot 100 (Billboard)	2
Finland (Suomen virallinen lista)	3
France (SNEP)	10
Germany (GfK)	10
Greece (IFPI)	2
Hungary (Rádiós Top 40)	17
Hungary (Single Top 40)	2
Ireland (IRMA)	7
Italy (FIMI)	1
Netherlands (Dutch Top 40)	4
Netherlands (Single Top 100)	4
New Zealand (Recorded Music NZ)	33
Norway (VG-lista)	9
Portugal (AFP)	1
Romania (Romanian Top 100)	7
Scottish Singles Sales (Official Charts)	3
Spain (Promusicae)	2
Sweden (Sverigetopplistan)	3
Switzerland (Schweizer Hitparade)	1
UK Singles (Official Charts)	2
UK Dance (Official Charts)	2
US Billboard Hot 100	37
US Dance Club Songs (Billboard) Remixes	1
US Dance Singles Sales (Billboard) Remixes	1
US Hot Latin Songs (Billboard)	43
US Pop Airplay (Billboard)	27

=== Year-end charts ===
Year-end chart performance for "American Life"
Chart (2003)	Position
Australian Dance (ARIA)	16
Belgium (Ultratop 50 Flanders)	95
Belgium (Ultratop 50 Wallonia)	79
Brazil (Crowley)	50
France (SNEP)	88
Ireland (IRMA)	100
Italy (FIMI)	18
Romania (Romanian Top 100)	55
Spain (AFYVE)	18
Sweden (Hitlistan)	46
Switzerland (Schweizer Hitparade)	60
Taiwan (Hito Radio)	74
UK Singles (OCC)	100
US Dance Club Play (Billboard)	36
US Dance Singles Sales (Billboard)	8

== Certifications and sales ==
Certifications and sales for "American Life"
Region	Certification	Certified units/sales
Australia (ARIA)	Gold	35,000^{^}
France (SNEP)	Gold	250,000^{*}
^{*} Sales figures based on certification alone.^{^} Shipments figures based on certification alone.

== Release history ==
Release dates and formats for "American Life"
Region	Date	Format(s)	Label	Ref.
United States	March 24, 2003	Contemporary hit radio; hot AC radio; rhythmic contemporary radio	Warner Bros.	
United States	April 8, 2003	CD single	Warner Bros.	
Australia	April 14, 2003	CD single	Warner Bros.	
United Kingdom	April 14, 2003	CD single	Warner Bros.	
Japan	April 23, 2003	CD single	Warner Music Japan	

== See also ==
- List of anti-war songs
- List of Billboard Hot Dance Music/Club Play number ones of 2003
- List of number-one hits of 2003 (Italy)
- List of number-one singles of the 2000s (Switzerland)
- List of number-one singles of 2003 (Canada)
- List of number-one songs of the 2000s (Denmark)

== Bibliography ==
- Easlea, Daryl (2012). Madonna: Blond Ambition. Backbeat Books. ISBN 978-1-61-713034-2.
- Gnojewski, Carol (2007). Madonna: Express Yourself. Enslow Pub Inc. ISBN 978-0-7660-2442-7.
- O'Brien, Lucy (2008). Madonna: Like an Icon. Transworld Publishers. ISBN 9780552153614.
- Rooksby, Rikky (2004). The Complete Guide to the Music of Madonna. Omnibus Press. ISBN 0-7119-9883-3.
