= My First Night Without You =

1989 single by Cyndi Lauper

Single by Cyndi Lauper

from the album A Night To Remember
- B-side: "Unabbreviated Love"
- Released: July 3, 1989
- Recorded: 1989
- Studio: The Hit Factory (New York, NY)
- Genre: Pop
- Length: 3:03
- Label: Epic Records
- Songwriters: Cyndi Lauper; Billy Steinberg; Tom Kelly
- Producers: Cyndi Lauper; Lennie Petze

Cyndi Lauper singles chronology
"I Drove All Night" (1989)	"My First Night Without You" (1989)	"Heading West" (1989)

Music video
- "My First Night Without You" on YouTube

"My First Night Without You" is the second single released from Cyndi Lauper's third album A Night To Remember (1989).

== Song information ==
The ballad is about coming home for the first time without a partner being there after a break up. The video clip is also about this, with Lauper coming home after a long day at work to an empty room after a separation. The song was written by Lauper, Tom Kelly and Billy Steinberg. The latter two also wrote "True Colors" and "I Drove All Night".

Its B-side was "Unabbreviated Love". The song is a fan favorite; Lauper performed it many times on her A Night to Remember tour in 1989.

To promote the single, promotional posters were sent to different malls and music stores that sold the single when it was originally released.

The single failed to make a big impact on most global charts. It did do moderately well in Chile however. And also, it achieved #1 in the Radio Cidade from São Paulo, Brazil. In Colombia, the single was #1 for 10 weeks.

== Reception ==
The song received a positive review from the pan-European magazine Music & Media, which named it one of their "singles of the week" and noted both the intro, reminiscent of "the classic Arthur Brown track Fire", and the overall song which was described as "passionate and dramatic".

== Music video ==
The video for "My First Night Without You", released in 1989, was one of the first to be closed-captioned for the hearing impaired.

== Chart performance ==
Chart (1989)	Peak position
Australian ARIA Singles Chart	47
Belgium (Ultratop Wallonia)	47
Chilean Singles Chart	12
French Singles Chart	46
Ireland (IRMA)	28
UK Singles Chart	53
U.S. Billboard Hot 100	62
U.S. Cash Box Top 100 Singles	55

== Track listing ==
7" / Cassette / Europe 3" CD single / Japan 3" CD single

1. "My First Night Without You" (edited remix) – 2:58
2. "Unabbreviated Love" – 4:18

UK Limited Edition 7" (with poster)

1. "My First Night Without You" (edited remix) – 2:58
2. "True Colors" – 3:47

12" / Europe 5" CD maxi-single

1. "My First Night Without You" (edited remix) – 2:58
2. "Unabbreviated Love" – 4:18
3. "True Colors" – 3:46

UK 12" / UK 5" CD single

1. "My First Night Without You" (edited remix) – 2:58
2. "Unabbreviated Love" – 4:18
3. "True Colors" – 3:47
4. "All Through the Night" – 4:32

UK Limited Edition Picture Disc CD single

1. "My First Night Without You" (edited remix) – 2:58
2. "Unabbreviated Love" – 4:18
3. "Iko Iko" – 2:05
4. "When You Were Mine" – 5:01

== Release history ==
Release dates and formats for "My First Night Without You"
Region	Date	Label(s)	Format(s)	Cat. No.	Ref.
United Kingdom	July 17, 1989	Epic	7-inch; 12-inch; CD	CYN 5; CYN T5; CDCYN 5	
United Kingdom	August 17, 1989	Epic	3-inch CD	6550911	
