= King of Hearts (Roy Orbison album) =

Studio album by Roy Orbison
- Released: October 20, 1992
- Recorded: 1985 ("Coming Home"); 1987–1992
- Genre: Rock; soft rock; country
- Length: 41:21
- Label: Virgin
- Producer: Various

Roy Orbison chronology
A Black & White Night Live (1989)	King of Hearts (1992)	One of the Lonely Ones (2015)

Singles from King of Hearts
- 1. "I Drove All Night" Released: June 22, 1992; 2. "Crying" Released: August 10, 1992; 3. "Heartbreak Radio" Released: 1992

King of Hearts is a posthumous album by American singer Roy Orbison, assembled by Jeff Lynne from various recording sessions in the years shortly before Orbison’s death. It was Orbison’s 23rd solo album, and released by Virgin Records.

According to the authorized Roy Orbison biography, the collection was originally released in October 1992 on CD, music cassette, and LP.

== History ==
Orbison died on December 6, 1988, aged 52, from a heart attack in the middle of his career revival. In February 1989, his new studio album Mystery Girl, on which Orbison had been working until his death, was released. Several songs on King of Hearts had been recorded during the Mystery Girl sessions, and there was enough material for another album. Some songs on King of Hearts were recorded as demos. Several individuals produced the recordings, including Lynne. They were: Don Was, David Was, Pete Anderson, Robbie Robertson, Will Jennings, David Briggs, Chips Moman, Guy Roche, Albert Hammond and Diane Warren.

Several songs had been previously released.

- "Wild Hearts Run Out of Time" was from the soundtrack of the 1985 film Insignificance, and under the title "Wild Hearts (...Time)" had been issued as a single in Canada, Australia and Europe that same year.
- "Coming Home" was initially issued on the 1986 collaborative album Class of '55: Memphis Rock & Roll Homecoming, which also featured Jerry Lee Lewis, Johnny Cash and Carl Perkins. It was Orbison's only solo lead vocal on that album.
- A duet with k.d. lang of Orbison's 1961 hit single "Crying" was released as part of the soundtrack for the 1987 motion picture Hiding Out. The collaboration won the Grammy Award for Best Country Collaboration with Vocals. The duet "Crying" was a minor US chart hit for the pair, peaking at No. 42 on the Hot Country Songs chart, but a more substantial hit in the UK in 1992, reaching No. 13 on the UK Singles Chart.

"I Drove All Night" was another hit single from the album.

Clarence Clemons performed saxophone on "We'll Take the Night".

== Reception ==
Professional ratings
Review scores
Source	Rating
AllMusic	3/5 stars
The Encyclopedia of Popular Music	4/5 stars
MusicHound	3/5 stars

William Ruhlmann of AllMusic believed "It certainly isn't near the quality of Mystery Girl, but, employing some of the same musicians and producers, it has much the same sound. If the material isn't of the same caliber, that's to be expected. And tracks like "Crying" and "I Drove All Night," if they pad the album out, also bring up its overall quality."

== Track listing ==
King of Hearts track listing
No.	Title	Writer(s)	Producer(s)	Length
1.	"You're the One"	Roy Orbison; Bill Dees	T Bone Burnett	2:59
2.	"Heartbreak Radio"	Troy Seals; Frankie Miller	Jeff Lynne	2:57
3.	"We'll Take the Night"	Orbison; Will Jennings; JD Souther	Don Was	4:55
4.	"Crying" (duet with k.d. lang)	Orbison; Joe Melson	Don Was; David Was; Pete Anderson	3:48
5.	"After the Love Has Gone"	Orbison; Jerry L. Williams	Don Was	4:38
6.	"Love in Time"	Orbison; Jennings	Robbie Robertson	5:31
7.	"I Drove All Night"	Billy Steinberg; Tom Kelly	Jeff Lynne	3:46
8.	"Wild Hearts Run Out of Time"	Orbison; Jennings	David Briggs; Will Jennings	4:10
9.	"Coming Home"	Orbison; Jennings; Souther	Chips Moman	4:00
10.	"Careless Heart" (original demo)	Orbison; Diane Warren; Albert Hammond	Albert Hammond; Diane Warren; Guy Roche; Roy Orbison	5:15

2007 reissue bonus track
No.	Title	Writer(s)	Producer(s)	Length
11.	"Life Fades Away"	Orbison; Glenn Danzig	Rick Rubin

== Charts ==
Chart performance for King of Hearts
Chart (1992)	Peak position
Australian Albums (ARIA)	25
New Zealand Albums (RMNZ)	18
UK Albums (OCC)	23
US Billboard 200	179

== Certifications ==
Certifications for King of Hearts
Region	Certification	Certified units/sales
Australia (ARIA)	Gold	35,000^{^}
^{^} Shipments figures based on certification alone.
