= Big Shiny Cars =

Studio album by Pinmonkey
- Released: March 7, 2006
- Genre: Country
- Length: 44:08
- Label: Back Porch
- Producer: Mark Bright; Kevin Beamish; Pinmonkey

Pinmonkey chronology
Pinmonkey (2002)	Big Shiny Cars (2006)

Big Shiny Cars is the third and final album by American country music band Pinmonkey. It was released in 2006 via Back Porch Records. The album contains the single "That Train Don't Run".

== Content ==
The only single off the album was "That Train Don't Run", a cover of Matraca Berg. Also included is a cover of Bruce Robison's "Wrapped". Elizabeth Cook and Rusty Young provide backing vocals on "Coldest Fire in Town".

== Critical reception ==
Country Standard Time writer Jeffrey B. Remz praised the album's country rock sound and Reynolds's lead vocals. He also stated that "They could have mixed it up with more sonic diversity, but at least what they offer is high quality." Writing for Country Weekly, Chris Neal gave the album three out of five stars. He described the band as having "crisp harmonies" and a "bracing country rock sound". Jonathan Keefe of Slant Magazine rated the album three-and-a-half stars out of five. He praised the band's choices of cover songs and original material, but thought the former resulted in uneven sequencing. He also considered the cover of "That Train Don't Run" inferior to Berg's original in terms of sound.

== Track listing ==
1. "That Train Don't Run" (Matraca Berg, Gary Harrison) - 2:36
2. "Down" (Dolly Parton) - 3:39
3. "Coldest Fire in Town" (Sean Locke, Billy Montana) - 3:29
  - featuring Elizabeth Cook and Rusty Young
4. "Mountain Song" (Chad Jeffers, Kieran Kane, Sean Locke) - 4:01
5. "Shady Grove" (Michael Reynolds) - 3:32
6. "Can't Have a Hand on Me" (Jeffers, Reynolds, Rachel Thibodeau) - 4:48
7. "Living Proof" (Reynolds) - 4:03
8. "Wrapped" (Bruce Robison) - 4:08
9. "Big Shiny Cars" (Davis Raines) - 3:38
10. "Love Sometimes" (Duane Jarvis, Joy Lynn White) - 3:53
