= Heading West (song) =

Single by Cyndi Lauper

from the album A Night to Remember
- B-side: "Insecurious"
- Released: December 4, 1989 (UK)
- Recorded: 1989
- Studio: The Hit Factory (New York, NY)
- Genre: Pop; adult contemporary
- Length: 3:52
- Label: Epic Records
- Songwriters: Cyndi Lauper; Billy Steinberg; Tom Kelly
- Producers: Cyndi Lauper; Lennie Petze

Cyndi Lauper singles chronology
"My First Night Without You" (1989)	"Heading West" (1989)	"A Night to Remember" (1989)

Music video
- "Heading West" on YouTube

"Heading West" was the third single from Cyndi Lauper's album A Night to Remember released worldwide. It was not released as a single in North America.

"Heading West" was written by Lauper, Billy Steinberg and Tom Kelly. The same team wrote "My First Night Without You, and the latter two wrote "True Colors", and "I Drove All Night". The song is about moving on from a past relationship, which was the overall theme of the album. A video was also released which was black and white and had Lauper in an empty field. The song was released outside of the U.S. The single was a minor hit in the UK. Cyndi Lauper said in an interview with O Globo newspaper that "'Heading West' was a great song."

French Canadian pop star Mitsou covered the song as the title track for a 1992 EP and also released it as a single. She added a French spoken word monologue to the end of the song.

== Critical reception ==
Upon single release Melody Maker observer Mick Mercer left positive review. As per him, this song as all singer's songs contain "lyrical incident". He concluded: "A rousing, if awkwardly shuffling, tune, give her a chance and it will hollow you out.

Music & Media described the song as a "lightweight production" that was "highly melodic" and a "slow-stepping ballad from an eccentric singer". In a later review, the song was described as "deceptively laid-back" with an "effective and dramatic build-up" and praised as her "best effort since "True Colors"".

== Track listing ==
Europe 7" / 2-track 3" CD single / Japan 3" CD single

1. "Heading West" – 3:54
2. "Calm Inside the Storm" – 3:55

UK and Australian 7" / cassette

1. "Heading West" – 3:54
2. "Insecurious" – 3:30

UK limited edition 7" (Compass Style Sleeve)

1. "Heading West" - 3:54
2. "Insecurious" - 3:30
3. "Money Changes Everything" (Live at Le Zenith) - 5:37

Europe 12" / 3–track 3" CD single

1. "Heading West" - 3:54
2. "Calm Inside the Storm" - 3:55
3. "Money Changes Everything" (album version)

UK 12"

1. "Heading West" - 3:54
2. "Insecurious" - 3:30
3. "She Bop" (Live at Le Zenith) - 5:12

UK 5" CD single

1. "Heading West" - 3:54
2. "Insecurious" - 3:30
3. "She Bop" (Live at Le Zenith) - 5:12
4. "Money Changes Everything" (Live at Le Zenith) - 5:37

UK limited edition picture disc CD single

1. "Heading West" - 3:54
2. "What's Going On" (Live at Le Zenith) - 5:07
3. "She Bop" (Live at Le Zenith) - 5:12
4. "Money Changes Everything" (Live at Le Zenith) - 5:38

== Chart performance ==
Chart (1989)	Peak position
Australian Singles Chart	117
Colombian Singles Chart	10
Polish Singles Chart	43
UK Singles Chart	68

== Release history ==
Release dates and formats for "Heading West"
Region	Date	Label(s)	Format(s)	Cat. No.	Ref.
United Kingdom	December 4, 1989	Epic	7-inch; 12-inch; CD	CYN 6; CYN T6; CDCYN 6	
United Kingdom	December 11, 1989	Epic	CD (Picture Disc); Cassette	CYN C6; CYNM 6	
