= I Drove All Night =

1989 single by Cyndi Lauper

"I Drove All Night" is a song written and composed by American songwriters Billy Steinberg and Tom Kelly, originally intended for Roy Orbison. Orbison recorded the track in 1987, the year before his death, although his version was not released until 1992. Before that, Cyndi Lauper recorded the song and issued it as a single from her album A Night to Remember. Her version became a top 10 hit on both sides of the Atlantic in 1989, and it was also her final top 40 entry on the American pop charts. Lauper continues to perform the song regularly in her live concerts.

The track was later covered by Canadian singer Celine Dion in 2003; her version topped the Canadian Singles Chart and reached number seven on the US Adult Contemporary chart. Another 2003 version, recorded by the country music band Pinmonkey, also reached the top 40 on the US Hot Country Songs chart.

== Cyndi Lauper version ==
"I Drove All Night"

Single by Cyndi Lauper

from the album A Night to Remember
- B-side: "Maybe He'll Know" (remix)
- Released: April 24, 1989
- Genre: Pop rock
- Length: 4:11
- Label: Epic
- Songwriters: Billy Steinberg; Tom Kelly
- Producers: Cyndi Lauper; Lennie Petze

Cyndi Lauper singles chronology
"Hole in My Heart (All the Way to China)" (1988)	"I Drove All Night" (1989)	"My First Night Without You" (1989)

Music video
- "I Drove All Night" on YouTube

"I Drove All Night" was recorded by American singer and songwriter Cyndi Lauper for her third solo album, A Night to Remember (1989). Lauper said she wanted to record the track because she liked the idea "of a woman driving, of a woman in control". The song became a top-10 hit in the United States, peaking at number six on the Billboard Hot 100, and it was also successful internationally. It was her eighth and final US top-10 single to date, as well as her 10th and final top-40 entry. The recording earned a nomination for the Grammy Award for Best Female Rock Vocal Performance. The music video, directed by Lauper and Scott Kalvert, includes the opening lines from the song "Kindred Spirit", shots of an antique car, Lauper’s energetic dancing, and projected film images on her body.

=== Critical reception ===
Billboard described the track as "yearning crystalline pop/rock" and noted the maturity of Lauper’s vocal performance. New Musical Express praised its "modern European sounds" and pointed to Lauper’s emotive delivery, calling the track an atmospheric "night-time driving" anthem. Jerry Smith of Music Week called Lauper "American with good ear" and praised her "assured and dramatic display", adding that the "passionate ballad" was "destined to return her to the charts once more". Tim Nicholson of Record Mirror described the track as "a punchy stab at power-driven west coast rock".

Edem E. Ephraim and Dennis Fuller of London Boys, reviewing singles for Number One on 26 April 1989, were disappointed by what they saw as a lack of "real Cyndi Lauper touch". They argued that Steinberg and Kelly, "who penned The Bangles Numero Uno 'Eternal Flame'", had created something too simple and suitable for any performer. Melody Maker offered a sarcastic assessment, calling the song a "typically bland slab of FM" and stating that Lauper’s "pioneering spirit and curious brand of transatlantic feminism add nothing" to it.

=== Formats and track listing ===
- U.S. 7-inch / cassette / CD single – 34-68759 / 34T 68759 / 34K 68759
  U.K. 7-inch / cassette single – CYN 4 / CYN M4
  Europe and Australia 7-inch single – 654837 7
  Australia cassette single – 654837 4
1. "I Drove All Night" – 4:08
2. "Maybe He'll Know" (Remix) – 3:41
- U.K. 12-inch / CD single – CYN T4 / CYN C4
  Europe and Australia 12-inch single – 654837 6
  Europe CD single – 654837 3
1. "I Drove All Night" – 4:08
2. "Maybe He'll Know" (Remix) – 3:41
3. "Boy Blue" (Live) – 5:37
- U.K. 12-inch single (Limited Edition) – CYN QT4
1. "I Drove All Night" – 4:08
2. "Maybe He'll Know" (Remix) – 3:41
3. "Girls Just Want to Have Fun" – 3:55
4. "Boy Blue" (Live) – 5:37
- U.K. CD single (Picture Disc) – CYN CD4
1. "I Drove All Night" – 4:08
2. "What's Going On" (Club version) – 6:35
3. "Maybe He'll Know" (Remix) – 3:41
4. "Time After Time" – 3:53

=== Charts ===
==== Weekly charts ====
Weekly chart performance
Chart (1989)	Peak position
Australia (ARIA)	11
Belgium (Ultratop 50 Flanders)	28
Canada Top Singles (RPM)	8
Canada Retail Singles (The Record)	12
Europe (European Hot 100 Singles)	16
European Airplay (Music & Media)	2
Finland (Suomen virallinen lista)	17
France (SNEP)	10
Ireland (IRMA)	13
Italy Airplay (Music & Media)	12
Luxembourg (Radio Luxembourg)	6
Netherlands (Single Top 100)	54
Netherlands (Dutch Top 40 Tipparade)	10
New Zealand (Recorded Music NZ)	10
Quebec (ADISQ)	9
UK Singles (Official Charts)	7
US Billboard Hot 100	6
US Adult Contemporary (Billboard)	43
US Cash Box Top 100	5
US Top 40 (Gavin Report)	7
US Contemporary Hit Radio (Radio & Records)	9
West Germany (GfK)	19

==== Year-end charts ====
Year-end chart performance
Chart (1989)	Position
Australia (ARIA)	55
Canada Top Singles (RPM)	90
Europe (European Hot 100 Singles)	76
European Airplay (Music & Media)	23
France (SNEP)	82
UK Singles (OCC)	77
US Top 40 (Gavin Report)	85
US Contemporary Hit Radio (Radio & Records)	84

=== Release history ===
Release history
Region	Date	Label	Format	Cat. No.	Ref.
United Kingdom	April 24, 1989	Epic	7-inch; 12-inch; 12-inch (Limited Edition); CD	CYN 4; CYN T4; CYN QT4; CYN C4	
United States	April 25, 1989	Epic	Contemporary hit radio	—N/a	

== Roy Orbison version ==
"I Drove All Night"

Single by Roy Orbison

from the album Nintendo: White Knuckle Scorin' and King of Hearts
- B-side: "Forever Friends" (Sheena Easton)
- Released: June 22, 1992
- Recorded: 1987
- Length: 3:46
- Label: MCA
- Songwriters: Billy Steinberg; Tom Kelly
- Producer: Jeff Lynne

Roy Orbison singles chronology
"Oh, Pretty Woman" (1990)	"I Drove All Night" (1992)	"Crying" (1992)

Music video
- "I Drove All Night" on YouTube

Jeff Lynne sampled Roy Orbison's 1987 recordings for the 1992 posthumous album King of Hearts, which included "I Drove All Night". However, Orbison's version first appeared on the 1991 Super Mario World-themed compilation Nintendo: White Knuckle Scorin'.

Released as a single in June 1992, the track became a significant hit in the United Kingdom, reaching number seven on the UK Singles Chart, matching the peak of Lauper's version three years earlier. King of Hearts and "I Drove All Night" were generally well received in the United States, returning Orbison to the Billboard charts and earning a Grammy Award.

A music video was produced for the single, starring Jason Priestley and Jennifer Connelly, intercut with archive footage of Orbison. The video also includes subtle background references to the Mario series and the compilation's theme.

The song is also featured in the film Paperback Hero, starring Hugh Jackman.

=== Charts ===
==== Weekly charts ====
Weekly chart performance
Chart (1992)	Peak position
Australia (ARIA)	132
Canada Top Singles (RPM)	74
Canada Adult Contemporary (RPM)	31
Europe (European Hot 100 Singles)	25
Germany (GfK)	52
Ireland (IRMA)	6
New Zealand (Recorded Music NZ)	48
UK Singles (Official Charts)	7
UK Airplay (Music Week)	3

==== Year-end charts ====
Year-end chart performance
Chart (1992)	Position
UK Singles (OCC)	54
UK Airplay (Music Week)	33

=== Certifications ===
Certifications
Region	Certification	Certified units/sales
United Kingdom (BPI)	Silver	200,000^{‡}
^{‡} Sales+streaming figures based on certification alone.

== Celine Dion version ==
"I Drove All Night"

Single by Celine Dion

from the album One Heart
- A-side: "I Drove All Night" (UK radio edit)
- Released: February 24, 2003
- Studio: Echo Beach; Masterplan
- Genre: Eurodisco; house; dance-pop
- Length: 4:00
- Label: Columbia; Epic
- Songwriters: Billy Steinberg; Tom Kelly
- Producers: Peer Åström; Vito Luprano

Celine Dion singles chronology
"Goodbye's (The Saddest Word)" (2002)	"I Drove All Night" (2003)	"One Heart" (2003)

Music video
- "I Drove All Night" on YouTube

"I Drove All Night" was recorded by Celine Dion for her eighth English-language studio album, One Heart (2003), and released as the lead single on February 24, 2003. The song appeared in a promotional advertisement for Chrysler. The music video for "I Drove All Night", directed by Peter Arnell, was released in February 2003. It was included on the United Kingdom enhanced double A-side single "One Heart" / "I Drove All Night". The track was commercially successful, reaching number one for five weeks in Canada, and also topping the charts in Belgium's Flanders and Sweden.

=== Background ===
In 2003, Chrysler signed Dion to a $14 million deal to endorse their cars. The company was looking for a song to use in the campaign and release as a single. Billy Steinberg knew Dion and had written "Falling into You", the title track of her 1996 album. He sent a copy of Roy Orbison's version of "I Drove All Night" to her record company, who approved it and had Dion record the track with Swedish producer Peer Åström. She incorporated the song into her Las Vegas show, and it became the centerpiece of the Chrysler campaign. The commercials provided strong exposure for the track and helped boost album sales, but they did not translate into increased car sales. Chrysler withdrew from the deal after complaints from dealers and disappointing results, although Dion was allowed to keep her $14 million fee.

In Dion's version, "I Drove All Night" is dance-pop. It was also described as "a little bit dance-club, a little bit rock and roll". In the second verse, Dion repeats a line as it appears in Orbison's original recording. Instead of singing "no matter where I go I hear the beating of our heart," she sings "our one heart", which inspired the title of the album on which the song appears. As in the original, the chorus is repeated twice to close the track.

=== Composition ===
Dion's version of "I Drove All Night" is set in the key of G♯ minor. It uses a moderately fast tempo of 135 beats per minute, and her vocals span from F♯_{3} to E_{5}.

=== Critical reception ===
The song received positive reviews from music critics. AllMusic senior editor Stephen Thomas Erlewine described it as "a tongue-in-cheek, neo-house cover" and selected it as one of the best tracks on the album, alongside the title track and "Have You Ever Been in Love". Rebecca Wallwork wrote a positive review for Amazon, calling it "the car-commercial-driven tempo". Jam!'s Darryl Sterdan described it as "a Cher-style eurodisco". Slant Magazine's Sal Cinquemani expressed a similar view, writing that "she gets the Cher treatment on the blazing cover". People's Chuck Arnold wrote that Dion "shows surprising restraint for a diva who just had a coliseum custom-built for her".

=== Commercial performance ===
In Canada, the song debuted at number one on the Canadian Hot 100 chart and spent five consecutive weeks at the top. "I Drove All Night" was Dion's third airplay-only single to appear on the Billboard Hot 100, where it peaked at number 45. The commercial single was released five months later and reached number 26 on the Hot 100 Singles Sales. Several club remixes, created mainly by Hex Hector, helped the song climb to number two on the Hot Dance Club Play.

In Australia, the song debuted and peaked at number 22 on the ARIA Charts on March 16, 2003. The following week, it fell to number 35 and continued to fluctuate for two more weeks before rising from number 44 to number 43. It later dropped to number 49, then climbed to number 38 the next week. The song spent 10 weeks on the chart and was certified gold. In New Zealand, it debuted at number 48 on the RIANZ chart on March 2, 2003. It climbed to number 46 the following week, then jumped to number 30 in its third week. After falling to number 32, it held at number 31 for two consecutive weeks. On April 20, 2003, the song rose to its peak of number 24. It spent nine weeks on the chart.

The song was even more successful on the Belgium's Flanders Singles Chart, where it debuted at number 14 on March 8, 2004. It jumped to number four the following week, then reached number one in its third week. The song remained in the top ten for 10 consecutive weeks and spent 15 weeks overall on the chart. It was certified platinum for sales of 50,000 copies. In Sweden, it debuted at number one on the Swedish Singles Chart on March 20, 2003. The following week, it fell to number 12, then to number 13 in its third week. In its fourth week, it rose to number seven, but continued to fluctuate for three more weeks before climbing from number 22 to number 16. It spent 17 weeks on the chart. On the Danish Singles Chart, the song debuted at number two, where it stayed for 3 consecutive weeks. It later fell to number five, then to number six, where it remained for another week.

In France, although it did not reach the top 20, the song performed steadily on the SNEP chart. It debuted at number 89, fell to number 94 in its second week, and to number 97 in its third week. After dropping out of the chart, it re-entered at number 22, its peak position, on April 26, 2003. It spent 11 non-consecutive weeks on the chart.

=== Music video and promotion ===
The music video, shot in Las Vegas, USA on February 2, 2003, was directed by advertising executive Peter Arnell, with cinematography by Rolf Kestermann and editing by Bee Ottinger. An arty black-and-white production, it shows Dion performing simple movements, while a couple in another setting appears to be enjoying a dance sequence. It was included on the UK enhanced CD single of "One Heart". The video was nominated for the MuchMoreMusic Award in 2003.

Dion appeared in four commercial spots for Chrysler, all scored with tracks from One Heart, including "I Drove All Night". These ads were also directed by Arnell and edited by Ottinger, with Darius Khondji serving as director of photography.

Dion performed "I Drove All Night" during the A New Day... show, and the track was included on the A New Day... Live in Las Vegas CD in 2004 and the Live in Las Vegas - A New Day... DVD in 2007. The A New Day... Live in Las Vegas bonus DVD, titled One Year...One Heart, included the recording of the song and behind-the-scenes footage from the video shoot.

The song also served as the opening number for the 2008–09 Taking Chances World Tour, preceded by an introduction video using a remix of "I Drove All Night". The audio and footage from this performance were included on the Taking Chances World Tour: The Concert CD/DVD. In October 2008, the song was included on the My Love: Essential Collection greatest hits album. Dion also performed the song during her 2017 European tour.

=== Formats and track listing ===
- Australian CD single
1. "I Drove All Night" – 4:00
2. "I Drove All Night" (Hex Hector extended vocal import mix) – 7:53
3. "I Drove All Night" (Hex Hector dub import mix) – 7:53
4. "Ten Days" – 3:37
- Canadian CD single
1. "I Drove All Night" – 4:00
2. "I Drove All Night" (Hex Hector extended vocal import mix) – 7:53
3. "I Drove All Night" (Hex Hector dub import mix) – 7:53
- European CD single
1. "I Drove All Night" – 4:00
2. "I Drove All Night" (UK radio edit) – 3:37
- European CD maxi-single
1. "I Drove All Night" – 4:00
2. "I Drove All Night" (UK radio edit) – 3:37
3. "I Drove All Night" (Hex Hector extended vocal import mix) – 7:53
- French CD single
1. "I Drove All Night" – 4:00
2. "I Drove All Night" (UK radio edit) – 3:37
3. "I'm Alive" (Humberto Gatica mix) – 3:30
4. "Je t'aime encore" – 3:24
- UK CD single #1
1. "One Heart" – 3:24
2. "I Drove All Night" – 4:00
3. "I Drove All Night" (Hex Hector extended vocal import mix) – 7:53
4. "I Drove All Night" (video) – 3:58
- UK CD single #2
1. "One Heart" – 3:24
2. "I Drove All Night" – 4:00
3. "All by Myself" – 5:12
4. "One Heart" (video) – 3:25
- US CD single
1. "I Drove All Night" – 4:00
2. "I Know What Love Is" – 4:28

=== Remixes ===
1. "I Drove All Night" (Hex Hector UK radio edit) – 3:37
2. "I Drove All Night" (Hex Hector extended vocal import mix) – 7:53
3. "I Drove All Night" (Hex Hector dub import mix) – 7:53
4. "I Drove All Night" (Hex Hector UK radio mix a capella) – 3:25
5. "I Drove All Night" (Chris "The Greek" Panaghi radio edit) – 3:49
6. "I Drove All Night" (Chris "The Greek" Panaghi club mix) – 6:06
7. "I Drove All Night" (Chris "The Greek" Panaghi instrumental) – 6:06
8. "I Drove All Night" (Everbots Fasha radio mix) – 3:58
9. "I Drove All Night" (Everbots Fasha mix) – 7:45
10. "I Drove All Night" (GW-1 radio remix) – 4:01
11. "I Drove All Night" (GW-1 remix) – 7:03
12. "I Drove All Night" (Junior Vasquez earth anthem mix) – 10:05
13. "I Drove All Night" (Original 3 remix) – 3:48
14. "I Drove All Night" (Polarbabies in Prague radio mix) – 3:11
15. "I Drove All Night" (Polarbabies in Prague club mix) – 6:23
16. "I Drove All Night" (Seismic Crew extended mix) – 4:36
17. "I Drove All Night" (Starrie Knights extended mix) – 4:09
18. "I Drove All Night" (Wayne G heaven radio edit) – 4:17
19. "I Drove All Night" (Wayne G heaven anthem mix) – 7:41
20. "I Drove All Night" (alternative mix) – 4:00

=== Charts ===
==== Weekly charts ====
Weekly chart performance
Chart (2003)	Peak position
Australia (ARIA)	22
Austria (Ö3 Austria Top 40)	17
Belgium (Ultratop 50 Flanders)	1
Belgium (Ultratop 50 Wallonia)	18
Canada (Nielsen SoundScan)	1
Czech Republic (Rádio Top 50)	1
Denmark (Tracklisten)	2
Europe (European Hot 100 Singles)	25
Finland (Suomen virallinen lista)	16
France (SNEP)	22
Germany (GfK)	22
Greece (IFPI)	7
Hungary (Rádiós Top 40)	7
Ireland (IRMA)	30
Italy (FIMI)	14
Netherlands (Dutch Top 40 Tipparade)	2
Netherlands (Single Top 100)	24
New Zealand (Recorded Music NZ)	23
Norway (VG-lista)	11
Poland (Polish Airplay Charts)	3
Portugal (AFP)	9
Quebec Radio Songs (ADISQ)	1
Romania (Romanian Top 100)	2
Scottish Singles Sales (Official Charts)	20
Spain (Promusicae)	15
Sweden (Sverigetopplistan)	1
Switzerland (Schweizer Hitparade)	11
UK Singles (Official Charts)	27
US Billboard Hot 100	45
US Adult Contemporary (Billboard)	7
US Adult Pop Airplay (Billboard)	23
US Dance Club Songs (Billboard)	2
US Pop Airplay (Billboard)	23
US Top 40 Tracks (Billboard)	32

==== Year-end charts ====
Year-end chart performance
Chart (2003)	Position
Belgium (Ultratop 50 Flanders)	27
Belgium (Ultratop 50 Wallonia)	92
Romania (Romanian Top 100)	6
Sweden (Hitlistan)	38
US Adult Contemporary (Billboard)	24
US Adult Top 40 (Billboard)	82

=== Certifications ===
Certifications
Region	Certification	Certified units/sales
Australia (ARIA)	Gold	35,000^{^}
Belgium (BRMA)	Gold	25,000^{*}
Canada (Music Canada)	Platinum	80,000^{‡}
United Kingdom (BPI)	Silver	200,000^{‡}
^{*} Sales figures based on certification alone.^{^} Shipments figures based on certification alone.^{‡} Sales+streaming figures based on certification alone.

=== Release history ===
Release history
Region	Date	Format	Label	Ref.
United States	January 21, 2003	Contemporary hit radio; hot adult contemporary radio	Epic	
Denmark	February 24, 2003	CD	Columbia	
Australia	March 3, 2003	CD	Epic	

== Pinmonkey version ==
"I Drove All Night"

Single by Pinmonkey

from the album Pinmonkey
- Released: 2003
- Genre: Country
- Length: 3:29
- Label: BNA
- Songwriters: Tom Kelly; Billy Steinberg
- Producers: Paul Worley; Mike Poole

Pinmonkey singles chronology
"Barbed Wire and Roses" (2002)	"I Drove All Night" (2003)	"Let's Kill Saturday Night" (2004)

In 2002, American country music band Pinmonkey covered the song on their self-titled album. According to group member Chad Jeffers, the idea of recording a country version came from his girlfriend, who was a fan of Cyndi Lauper's rendition. To ensure their cover sounded distinct, the band intentionally avoided listening to Lauper's version, instead basing their arrangement on an acoustic performance sung by Jeffers. The cover was issued as the album's second promotional single in 2003 and peaked at number 36 on Hot Country Songs.

Jack Leaver of The Grand Rapids Press praised the recording for its vocal harmony and country rock sound. In Billboard, Deborah Evans Price wrote that the band members "capably make it their own. Reynolds' vocals effectively convey the emotional urgency in the lyric, and Worley's production lets the band flaunt the smoother side of the group's country rock chops".

=== Charts ===
Chart performance
Chart (2003)	Peak position
US Hot Country Songs (Billboard)	36

== See also ==
- List of Billboard Hot 100 top-ten singles in 1989
- List of number-one singles of 2003 (Canada)
- List of number-one singles of the 2000s (Sweden)
- List of Ultratop 50 number-one singles of 2003
- List of UK top-ten singles in 1992
