= St. James Encyclopedia of Popular Culture =

- Author: Tom Pendergast, Sara Pendergast
- Language: English
- Subject: History
- Genre: Reference encyclopedia
- Publisher: Gale
- Publication date: 2000–present
- Publication place: United States
- Media type: As of 2011, 5 volumes (hardbound)
- ISBN: 1-55862-405-8

The St. James Encyclopedia of Popular Culture is a cross-curriculum English-language resource that publishes scholarly articles and features on a range of popular culture topics such as television, film, theater, radio, music, print media, sports, fashion, health and politics.

== Publication history ==
It was first published by Gale in 2000. The encyclopaedia grew in size, and by its fourth edition (2003) it had expanded to 2,700 signed essays written by subject experts and professionals. It is also available in print, and as an e-book.

== See also ==
- Low culture
- High culture
- Folk culture
