= George Ducas (singer) =

American country music singer (born 1966)

- Born: August 1, 1966 (age 60); Galveston, Texas, U.S.
- Genre: Country
- Occupation: Singer-songwriter
- Instruments: Vocals, acoustic guitar, electric guitar
- Years active: 1992–present
- Labels: Liberty; Capitol Nashville; Loud Ranch
- Website: www.georgeducas.com

George Ducas (born August 1, 1966) is an American country music singer and songwriter. He has released four studio albums: 1994's George Ducas, 1997's Where I Stand, 2013's 4340 and 2019's Yellow Rose Motel. His first two albums charted six consecutive singles on the Billboard Hot Country Singles & Tracks (now Hot Country Songs) chart, the highest being his signature hit "Lipstick Promises".

== Early life ==
George Ducas was born in Galveston, Texas, in August 1, 1966. He was raised in his early years by his father Steve (an Exxon chemical engineer) and his mother Irene (a teacher and a poet) in nearby Texas City, Texas. When he was 5, his parents divorced and he spent the next five years in California with his mother, who gave him his first guitar. He then moved back to Houston, Texas to live with his father and stepmother to attend middle school and high school. Ducas attended Lamar High School in Houston and afterward attended Vanderbilt University, graduating with a degree in economics. After working six months at an Atlanta bank, he quit and relocated to Nashville to pursue a full-time career in music.

== Career ==
Ducas performed in Nashville area clubs by night and honed his songwriting skills by day. In 1992, songwriter Radney Foster took "Just Call Me Lonesome", a song Ducas co-wrote, into the Top Ten on the country charts.

Ducas' debut single "Teardrops" became a Top 40 hit on the Billboard Hot Country Songs charts. "Lipstick Promises" followed in early 1995 reaching #9 leading the way to the release of his eponymous self-titled debut album. George Ducas also produced the No. 52 "Hello Cruel World" and the No. 72 "Kisses Don't Lie".

Due to a restructuring of Liberty Records, Ducas was transferred to Capitol Records Nashville. Initially Ducas' sophomore album Where I Stand was slated for release in 1996, however some record label shuffling pushed the release into the following year kicking off with the lead single "Every Time She Passes By” followed by “Long Trail Of Tears”.

Ducas was a songwriter for artists Garth Brooks, Sara Evans, Eli Young Band, Randy Rogers Band, Gary Allan, The Chicks, and Trisha Yearwood. He co-wrote - "Beer Run (B Double E Double Are You In?)", a duet for Garth Brooks and George Jones - which received a Grammy nomination in 2002 for Best Country Collaboration with Vocals.

In 2005, Ducas and Radney Foster co-wrote the No. 1 hit "A Real Fine Place to Start" for Sara Evans which led to Ducas spending the latter half of 2007 opening shows for her.

In October 2013, Ducas released 4340 through the newly created independent label Loud Ranch. In 2016, Ducas released the single "Party with Your Boots On" which was licensed to the Houston Livestock Show and Rodeo as their first official artist theme song on a limited term usage agreement.

Ducas’ fourth studio album Yellow Rose Motel was released in January 2020. In addition to writing and recording the album in several Nashville recording sessions throughout 2017 and 2018, Ducas also co-produced the album. The song “Eastwood”, the first of three music videos from the album, became Ducas’ second #1 CMT video and remained in the top spot for three weeks.

In 2020, as a celebration of the 25th anniversary of his biggest hit, Ducas recorded a new version of "Lipstick Promises." American Songwriter Magazine called the new version 'a fun re-work' as "...the new version now features a little more energy as George kicked the tempo up a couple of notches. It hasn’t changed per se, it just sounds a little more like he plays it when he’s live onstage."

In 2020, Ducas began the process of recording his new album Long Way From Home, which was produced by Pete Anderson (Dwight Yoakam) and released in June of 2024.

== Discography ==
=== Studio albums ===
List of studio albums, with release date, label, and selected chart positions shown
Title	Album details	Peak chart positions	
Title	Album details	US Country	US Heat
George Ducas	Released: September 12, 1994; Label: Liberty Records	57	36
Where I Stand	Released: January 14, 1997; Label: Capitol Nashville	—	—
4340	Released: October 29, 2013; Label: Loud Ranch	—	—
Yellow Rose Motel	Release date: December 6, 2019; Label: Loud Ranch	—	—
Long Way From Home	Release date: June 21, 2024; Label: Loud Ranch/Xstream Music Group		
"—" denotes releases that did not chart.

=== Singles ===
Year	Single	Peak chart positions		Album
Year	Single	US Country	CAN Country	Album
1994	"Teardrops"	38	—	George Ducas
1994	"Lipstick Promises"	9	6	George Ducas
1995	"Hello Cruel World"	52	46	George Ducas
1995	"Kisses Don't Lie"	72	75	George Ducas
1996	"Every Time She Passes By"	57	26	Where I Stand
1997	"Long Trail of Tears"	55	52	Where I Stand
2010	"Never Goes Away"	—	—	Volume Up, Windows Down
2011	"Breakin' Stuff"	—	—	Volume Up, Windows Down
2012	"Cowtown"	—	—	Volume Up, Windows Down
2014	"All Kinds of Crazy"	—	—	4340
2015	"LoveStruck"	—	—	4340
2020	"Lipstick Promises (Reboot)"	—	—	
"—" denotes releases that did not chart

=== Music videos ===
Year	Video	Director
1994	"Teardrops"	Piers Plowden
1995	"Lipstick Promises"	Piers Plowden
1995	"Hello Cruel World"	Roger Pistole
1995	"Kisses Don't Lie"	D. J. Webster
1996	"Every Time She Passes By"	D. J. Webster
2015	"Party with Your Boots On"	Liz Chapman
2019	"Eastwood"	Cody Villalobos
2019	"Unlove You"	Cody Villalobos
2020	"Lipstick Promises (Reboot)"	Ben Boutwell
