= Mark Selby (musician) =

American musician

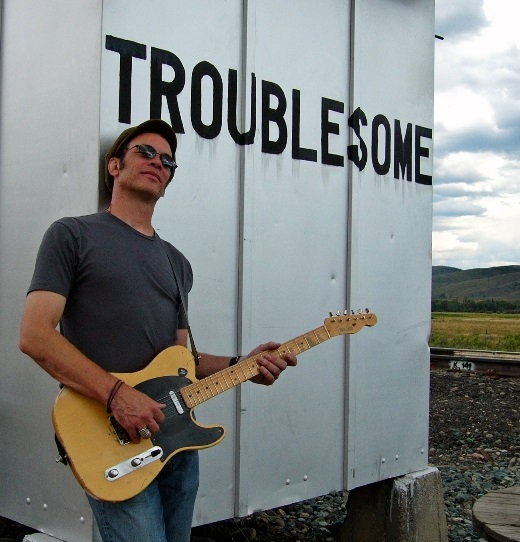

Background information
- Born: Mark Otis Selby; September 2, 1961; Enid, Oklahoma, U.S.
- Died: September 18, 2017 (aged 56) Nashville, Tennessee, U.S.
- Genres: Blues rock
- Occupations: Musician, singer-songwriter
- Instrument: Guitar
- Years active: 1990-2017
- Label: Vanguard, ZYX

Mark Otis Selby (September 2, 1961 – September 18, 2017) was an American blues rock singer-songwriter, guitarist, multi-instrumentalist, and record producer. Born in Enid, Oklahoma, he was a solo artist, signed to ZYX Records in Europe, and one half of performing duo with his wife, songwriter Tia Sillers. He also played guitar in recording sessions for musical artists such as Kenny Rogers, Johnny Reid, Keni Thomas, Jimmy Hall, and Wynonna Judd.

Selby is perhaps best known for the number of songs that he co-wrote with the blues-rock artist Kenny Wayne Shepherd which includes the No. 1 single, "Blue on Black". This song was also Billboard magazine rock track of the year in 1998. Selby also collaborated with Sillers on the No. 1 song, "There's Your Trouble" and won the band their first Grammy Award for Best Country Performance by a Duo or Group with Vocal in 1999.

Selby released a number of solo albums over his career. The first two projects, More Storms Comin' and Dirt were on Vanguard Records. After signing with ZYX in Merenberg, Germany, he released his next album, Mark Otis Selby And The Horse He Rode In On. This all-acoustic release featured Selby's 1974 Mossman guitar and spurred a broad audience in Germany and Switzerland. His most recent project, Blue Highway, was released in 2013. He has worked with the Grammy winning record producer Brent Maher on 5 of his projects.

In 2016, Selby was inducted into the Kansas Music Hall Of Fame.

Besides the Mossman, he played a modified 1990s Fender Relic Nocaster, a Fender Rory Gallagher Fender Stratocaster, and a 1944 Gibson J-45. As for amplifiers, he described himself as "a Fender guy."

Selby died on September 18, 2017, from cancer.

== Influences ==
When asked to describe some of his influences, he noted, "When I was younger, I really got into an Eric Clapton anthology that had a cross selection of songs he was well known for, and some spontaneous jams with Jimmy Page and Muddy Waters. There was so much emotion and a big slice of life in those songs performed by the old blues players...Billy Gibbons was also a very big influence...He had a great way of synthesizing a lot of great styles and making it his own."

== Select discography ==
=== Albums ===
- 1984: One way ticket
- 1986: One of these days
- 1990: Wheatfield Boogie (Mark Selby & The Sluggers)
- 2000: More Storms Comin'
- 2003: Dirt
- 2006: Mark Otis Selby And The Horse He Rode In On
- 2008: Nine Pound Hammer
- 2009: Live at Rockpalast - One Night In Bonn
- 2013: Blue Highway
- 2018: Naked Sessions

=== Compilation albums ===
- 2001: Avalon Blues: A Tribute To The Music Of Mississippi John Hurt
- 2007: Mark Selby's Nashville Picks! (Vol. 1)
- 2014: Mark Selby: The Box Set
- 2017: One Night With Mark Selby

== Singles written by Selby ==
Year	Title	Artist(s)
1995	"Deja Voodoo"	Kenny Wayne Shepherd
1997	"Slow Ride" "Somewhere, Somehow, Someway" "Blue on Black"	Kenny Wayne Shepherd
1998	"There's Your Trouble"	The Dixie Chicks
2000	"She's Like Mercury" "Last Goodbye" "Change"	Mark Selby Kenny Wayne Shepherd Sons Of The Desert
2001	"I Cry" "Was"	Tammy Cochran Kenny Wayne Shepherd
2002	"Barbed Wire and Roses"	Pinmonkey
2003	"Back Door To My Heart"	Mark Selby
2011	"Never Lookin' Back" "Come On Over"	Kenny Wayne Shepherd
2014	"Honey, Honey"	Johnny Reid
2015	"Picture Of You"	Johnny Reid
