= Tia Sillers =

American Grammy Award-winning songwriter

- Born: Stamford, Connecticut, U.S.
- Genres: Country, Pop, Blues, Rock
- Occupation: Songwriter
- Years active: 1990-present
- Spouse: Mark Selby (m. 2001; died 2017)
- Website: https://www.instagram.com/tiasillers

Tia Maria Sillers is an American songwriter. She has written over 40 singles in multiple music formats, including the Lee Ann Womack single "I Hope You Dance", and the Kenny Wayne Shepherd single "Blue on Black". Sillers' songs have been featured in numerous films, television shows and commercials.

== Early life and career ==
Born in Stamford, Connecticut, Sillers' family moved several times during her childhood before finally settling in Nashville, Tennessee in 1980. It was while at Father Ryan High School that Tia first attended Writer's Night shows at the Bluebird Cafe. The writers Don Schlitz and Alan Shamblin were among her earliest influences. While attending the University of North Carolina at Chapel Hill, Sillers began writing songs. The Nashville Broadcast Music Inc. (BMI) office on Music Row helped secure her first publishing deal with Tom Collins Music in 1991 and had her first cuts and single with George Ducas on Liberty Records. The single "Lipstick Promises", which peaked at #10, helped establish her reputation.

== 1990s-2000s ==
Sillers, along with Mark D. Sanders, wrote the Lee Ann Womack song "I Hope You Dance". The song became a No. 1 country hit and Top 20 pop hit for Lee Ann Womack and received the Grammy Award for "Best Country Song," as well as a Grammy nomination for Song of the Year. The song also received CMA & ACM Awards for Song of the Year in 2000. The song stayed on top of the Billboard Country chart for five consecutive weeks.

The song's popularity led to the release of a book entitled "I Hope You Dance", another collaboration of Sillers and Sanders, which became a New York Times Bestseller. The book contains poems and writings inspired by the song and has sold over two million copies to date. There is also an "I Hope You Dance" children's book and journal. Sanders and Sillers later collaborated again on a book entitled "Climb". In film, the song was featured in the 2008 movie Tyler Perry's The Family That Preys with lines from the song in the script and multiple versions performed both by Womack and Gladys Knight. Additionally, a 2015 documentary 'I Hope You Dance: The Power and Spirit of Song' which included commentary by Maya Angelou and Brian Wilson was released as a Hallmark Special.

Sillers wrote "Blue on Black" with Kenny Wayne Shepherd and Mark Selby. Released on April 7, 1998, the track spent 42 weeks on the US Billboard Hot Mainstream Rock Tracks chart and rose to number one, remaining there for six non-consecutive weeks. "Blue on Black" was regarded as the best rock song of 1998 by various media, winning the Billboard Music Award for Rock Track of the Year. In 2019, "Blue on Black" enjoyed number one success again, this time recorded as a vocal and musical event including Five Finger Death Punch, Brantley Gilbert, Kenny Wayne Shepherd and Brian May.

More than 30 million records have been sold featuring Sillers' compositions. Her catalog has stretched across genres, countries, and generations of recording artists, including David Nail, John Waite, Engelbert Humperdinck, Little River Band, Vince Gill, Patti Page, Ronan Keating, John Pardi, Jennifer Lopez and Five Finger Death Punch.

== 2018 to Present ==
In 2019, "Blue on Black" enjoyed number one success again, this time recorded as a vocal and musical event including Five Finger Death Punch, Brantley Gilbert, Kenny Wayne Shepherd and Brian May.

Tia Sillers is a 2020 and 2021 Nashville Songwriters Hall of Fame nominee.

== Awards and nominations ==
In 1998, Sillers' song, "Blue On Black", won a Billboard Music Award for Rock Track Of The Year. Sillers' most recent award was in 2010 from the Canadian Country Music Association (CCMA) Songwriter(s) of the Year for the song "Dance with Me" (written by Victoria Banks, Johnny Reid, and Tia Sillers; recorded by Johnny Reid).

Year	Award	Song	Artist	Result
1998	Billboard Music Award	"Blue On Black"	Kenny Wayne Shepherd	Won
1999	Grammy Award	"There's Your Trouble"	Dixie Chicks	Won
2000	CMA	"I Hope You Dance"	Lee Ann Womack	Won
2001	Grammy Award	"I Hope You Dance"	Lee Ann Womack	Won
2001	Grammy Award	"I Hope You Dance"	Lee Ann Womack	Nominated
2001	Academy of Country Music	"I Hope You Dance"	Lee Ann Womack	Won
2001	Nashville Songwriters Association International	"I Hope You Dance"	Lee Ann Womack	Won
2001	ASCAP	"I Hope You Dance"	Lee Ann Womack	Won
2001	BMI	"I Hope You Dance"	Lee Ann Womack	Won
2007	GMA Dove Award	"Jonah, Job, Moses & Me"	Oak Ridge Boys	Won
2009	Grammy Award	"Heaven, Heartache & the Power of Love"	Trisha Yearwood	Nominated
2009	Canadian Country Music Association	"The Wheel"	Victoria Banks	Nominated
2010	Canadian Country Music Association	"Dance With Me"	Johnny Reid	Won

== Notable works ==
- "I Hope You Dance" – Lee Ann Womack
- "Blue on Black" – Kenny Wayne Shepherd
- "Déjá Voodoo" - Kenny Wayne Shepherd
- "Was" - Kenny Wayne Shepherd
- "Last Goodbye" - Kenny Wayne Shepherd
- "Lipstick Promises" - George Ducas
- "There's Your Trouble" – Dixie Chicks
- "That’ll Be Alright" – Alan Jackson
- "Sam Loves Joann" - Tiffany
- "Barbed Wire & Roses" – Pinmonkey
- "I Cry" – Tammy Cochran
- "Land of the Living" – Pam Tillis
- "Heaven, Heartache & the Power of Love" - Trisha Yearwood
- "The Wheel" - Victoria Banks
- "Dance With Me" - Johnny Reid
- "Firewalker" - Shannon LaBrie

== Personal life ==
In 2001, Sillers married musician and frequent collaborator Mark Selby. Their marriage ended with Selby's death from cancer in 2017.

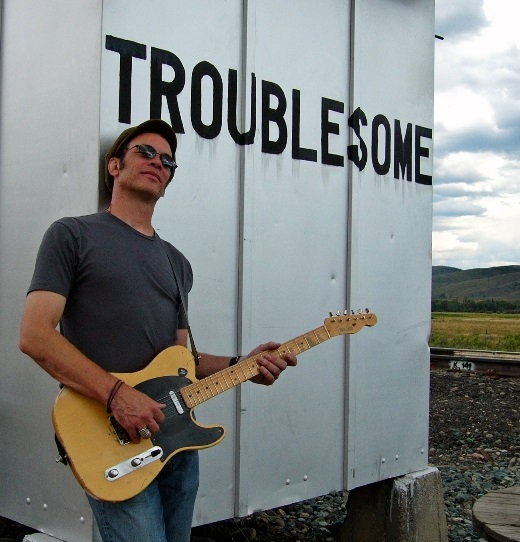
Mark Selby - electric guitar 1
