= Joe Galante =

American music industry executive

Joe Galante (born December 18, 1949, New York City, NY) is an American music industry executive. He is noted for his role in developing the careers of Waylon Jennings, Dolly Parton, Alabama, Kenny Chesney, Sara Evans, Brad Paisley, Martina McBride, Vince Gill, Clint Black, Miranda Lambert, and The Judds, among others.

Galante was inducted into the Country Music Hall of Fame by Kix Brooks in 2022 alongside Keith Whitley and Jerry Lee Lewis.

== RCA ==
Galante began working at RCA Records in New York in 1971. He was transferred to RCA Nashville in 1974; although originally intended to be a temporary stay, Galante remained in Nashville as a director at the label. During the early years of his career, he was criticized because he lacked a traditional background in the music industry. Galante continued to be promoted at the label, becoming vice president of promotion and marketing. In 1982, he was named head of RCA's Nashville division; then 32, he became the youngest person ever named to run a major country record label, succeeding Jerry Bradley.

In 1990, Galante returned to New York to become national president of RCA Records. He returned to Nashville in 1995 to run the RCA and BNA labels in Nashville as chairman RLG/Nashville. He was named chairman of Sony Music Nashville in 2007 and served in that position until 2010.

With Galante as president, RCA Records was the number-one country label for 11 years in a row. He was presented with the Bob Kingsley Living Legend Award by the Opry Trust Fund to honor his work for country music and RCA on February 10, 2015.

== See also ==
- RCA Records
- Waylon Jennings
