= Detour Tour =

2016 concert tour by Cyndi Lauper

- Tour by Cyndi Lauper
- Promotional poster for the tour
- Associated album: Detour
- Start date: May 9, 2016
- End date: October 8, 2016
- Legs: 3
- No. of shows: 39 in North America; 9 in Europe; 48 total

Cyndi Lauper concert chronology
- She's So Unusual: 30th Anniversary Tour (2013–2014); Detour Tour (2016); North American Tour (2017–2018)

The Detour Tour was the thirteenth concert tour by American recording artist Cyndi Lauper. The tour supported her eleventh studio album, Detour. The tour began May 2016 in Nashville, Tennessee and continued with shows in North America and Europe.

== Background ==
In March 2016, it was announced Lauper and Boy George were co-headlining shows in the United States. Later in the month, the singer revealed a full tour and announced her album. The tour features shows in the United Kingdom, her first since over five years. For the first leg of the tour, ticket sales were good, prompting a second round of dates in the U.S. When describing the vibe of the tour, Lauper stated:

"When I was a really young kid, country music was pop music, so this is what we grew up listening to. These songs are part of some of my earliest memories, so it has been an absolute thrill to revisit them."

== Opening acts ==
- The Peach Kings (select North America—Leg 1 dates)
- Operator EMZ (Uncasville)
- Rosie O'Donnell (New York City, Bethlehem and Atlantic City)
- Indigo Girls (Lincoln)

== Setlist ==
The following setlist was obtained from the May 9, 2016 concert, held at the Ryman Auditorium in Nashville, Tennessee. It does not represent all shows during the tour.

1. "Funnel of Love"
2. "She Bop"
3. "Heartaches by the Number"
4. "I Drove All Night"
5. "The End of the World"
6. "Walkin' After Midnight"
7. "Detour"
8. "I Want to Be a Cowboy's Sweetheart"
9. "Dear John"
10. "You Don't Know"
11. "Money Changes Everything"
12. "Misty Blue"
13. "Time After Time"
14. "When You Were Mine"
15. "Girls Just Want to Have Fun"
16. "True Colors"

== Tour dates ==
Date	City	Country	Venue
North America
May 9, 2016	Nashville	United States	Ryman Auditorium
May 11, 2016	Louisville	United States	Palace Theatre
May 13, 2016	Munhall	United States	Carnegie Library Music Hall
May 14, 2016	Ann Arbor	United States	Michigan Theater
May 16, 2016	Chicago	United States	Chicago Theatre
May 17, 2016	Northfield	United States	Hard Rock Live
May 20, 2016^{[A]}	Uncasville	United States	Mohegan Sun Arena
May 21, 2016^{[A]}	Boston	United States	Wang Theatre
May 25, 2016^{[A]}	New York City	United States	Beacon Theatre
May 26, 2016^{[A]}	New York City	United States	Beacon Theatre
May 28, 2016^{[A]}	Bethlehem	United States	Sands Bethlehem Event Center
May 29, 2016^{[A]}	Atlantic City	United States	Borgata Event Center
June 1, 2016^{[A]}	Vienna	United States	Filene Center
June 2, 2016	Charleston	United States	Charleston Music Hall
June 4, 2016	Raleigh	United States	Raleigh Memorial Auditorium
June 5, 2016	Atlanta	United States	Atlanta Symphony Hall
June 8, 2016	Clearwater	United States	Ruth Eckerd Hall
June 9, 2016	Orlando	United States	Walt Disney Theater
June 11, 2016	Boca Raton	United States	Mizner Park Amphitheater
June 12, 2016	St. Augustine	United States	St. Augustine Amphitheatre
Europe
June 22, 2016	Birmingham	England	Symphony Hall
June 23, 2016	Glasgow	Scotland	Glasgow Royal Concert Hall
June 25, 2016	Newcastle	England	Newcastle City Hall
June 26, 2016^{[B]}	Pilton	England	Worthy Farm
June 30, 2016	London	England	Eventim Apollo
July 2, 2016	Cologne	Germany	E-Werk
July 3, 2016^{[C]}	Vienna	Austria	Vienna State Opera
July 6, 2016^{[D]}	Rome	Italy	Auditorium Cavea
July 7, 2016^{[E]}	Turin	Italy	Arena Verde Esterna di Le Gru
July 11, 2016	Paris	France	Le Grand Rex
North America
September 9, 2016	Austin	United States	Moody Theater
September 10, 2016	Austin	United States	Moody Theater
September 11, 2016	Houston	United States	Revention Music Center
September 13, 2016	Oklahoma City	United States	Gaylord Performing Arts Theatre
September 15, 2016	Kansas City	United States	Uptown Theater
September 18, 2016	Denver	United States	Paramount Theatre
September 20, 2016	Salt Lake City	United States	The Depot
September 21, 2016^{[F]}	Boise	United States	Outlaw Field
September 23, 2016	Lincoln	United States	Thunder Valley Outdoor Amphitheater
September 24, 2016	Rancho Mirage	United States	The Show at Agua Caliente
September 27, 2016	Saratoga	United States	Mountain Winery Amphitheater
September 28, 2016	Paso Robles	United States	Vina Robles Amphitheatre
September 30, 2016	Santa Barbara	United States	Arlington Theater
October 2, 2016^{[G]}	San Francisco	United States	Lindley Meadow
October 3, 2016	San Diego	United States	Humphrey's Concerts By The Bay
October 5, 2016	Los Angeles	United States	Greek Theatre
October 7, 2016	Scottsdale	United States	The Showroom at Talking Stick Resort
October 8, 2016	Las Vegas	United States	The Joint

Festivals and other miscellaneous performances
^{A} Concerts co-headlined with Boy George
^{B} Glastonbury Festival
^{C} Jazz Fest Wien
^{D} Luglio suona bene
^{E} GruVillage Festival
^{F} Outlaw Field Summer Concert Series
^{G} Hardly Strictly Bluegrass

Cancellations and rescheduled shows

July 2, 2016	Cologne, Germany	Open-Air-Gelände Tanzbrunnen	Moved to E-Werk

== Broadcasts and recordings ==
Filmed from Austin's Moody Theatre on September 10, 2016, the performance aired on PBS television in January 2017.
