= List of awards and nominations received by Cyndi Lauper =

Cyndi Lauper awards and nominations
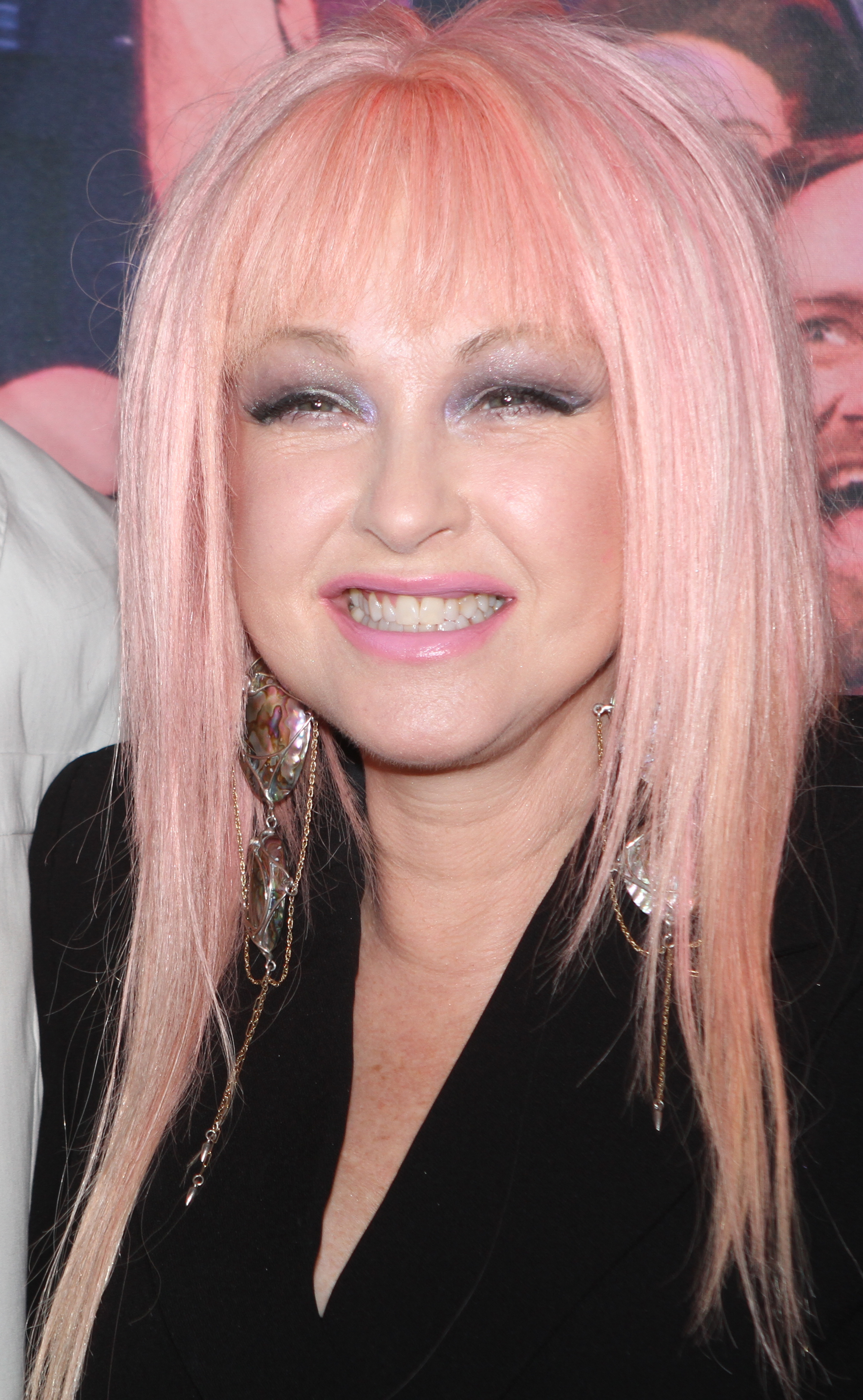
- Lauper in 2017
Awards and nominations
Award	Wins	Nominations
Grammy Awards	2	15
Billboard Awards	4	25
MTV Video Music Award	3	16
American Music Awards	2	3
Emmy Award	1	2
BMI Awards	10	10
Tony Award	1	1

Totals (Note: Certain award groups do not simply award one winner. They acknowledge several different recipients, have runners-up, and have third place. Since this is a specific recognition and is different from losing an award, runner-up mentions are considered wins in this award tally. For simplification and to avoid errors, each award in this list has been presumed to have had a prior nomination.)
- Wins: 46
- Nominations: 79

This is a list of awards and nominations received by American singer Cyndi Lauper. Among her numerous accolades, Lauper has won two Grammys (1985, 2014) an Emmy (1995) and a Tony (2013), which are three of the four major annual American entertainment awards (EGOT).

== American Video Awards ==
The American Video Awards was an annual music video award show taped for distribution to television that ran from 1983 to 1987.

Year	Nominee / work	Award	Result
1984	"Girls Just Want to Have Fun"	Best Female Performance	Won

== Billboard Music Awards ==
The Billboard Music Awards are held to honor artists for commercial performance in the U.S., based on record charts published by Billboard.

Year	Nominee / work	Award	Result
1984	Cyndi Lauper	Top Female Artist	Won
1984	Cyndi Lauper	Top New Artist	Won
1984	Cyndi Lauper	Top Billboard 200 Artist – Female	Won
1984	Cyndi Lauper	Top Hot 100 Artist – Female	Won
1984	Cyndi Lauper	Top Hot 100 Artist	Nominated
1984	Cyndi Lauper	Top Disco Artist	Nominated
1984	Cyndi Lauper	Top Disco Artist – Female	Nominated
1984	Cyndi Lauper	Top Adult Contemporary Artist – Female	Nominated
1984	"Time After Time"	Top Adult Contemporary Single	Nominated
1985	Cyndi Lauper	Top Artist	Nominated
1985	Cyndi Lauper	Top Billboard 200 Artist	Nominated
1985	Cyndi Lauper	Top Billboard 200 Artist – Female	Nominated
1985	Cyndi Lauper	Top Hot 100 Artist	Nominated
1985	Cyndi Lauper	Top Hot 100 Artist – Female	Nominated
1985	She's So Unusual	Top Billboard 200 Album	Nominated
1985	"All Through the Night"	Top Hot 100 Song	Nominated
1985	"All Through the Night"	Top Adult Contemporary Single	Nominated
1986	Cyndi Lauper	Top Artist	Nominated
1986	Cyndi Lauper	Top Billboard 200 Artist	Nominated
1986	Cyndi Lauper	Top Billboard 200 Artist – Female	Nominated
1986	Cyndi Lauper	Top Hot 100 Artist	Nominated
1986	Cyndi Lauper	Top Hot 100 Artist – Female	Nominated
1986	True Colors	Top Billboard 200 Album	Nominated
1986	"Change of Heart"	Top Hot 100 Song	Nominated
1986	"Change of Heart"	Top Dance Club Play Single	Nominated
1989	A Night to Remember	Top Pop Album Artists - Female	Nominated

== Cashbox Awards ==
Awards from Cashbox magazine.

Year	Nominee / work	Award	Result
1984	Cyndi Lauper	Pop Singles Awards: Top Female Vocalist	Won
1984	Cyndi Lauper	Pop Singles Awards: Top New Female Vocalist	Won
1984	Cyndi Lauper	Pop Album Awards: Top Female Vocalist	Won
1984	Cyndi Lauper	Pop Album Awards: Top New Female Vocalist	Won
1984	Cyndi Lauper	Black Contemporary Singles: Top Pop Crossover Vocalist	3rd place
1984	Cyndi Lauper	12" Singles: Top Female Vocalist	3rd place
1984	Cyndi Lauper	12" Singles: Top New Female Vocalist	Won
1984	Cyndi Lauper	Music Video & Videocassette Awards: Top Female Vocalist	2nd place
1984	Cyndi Lauper	Music Video & Videocassette Awards: Top New Female Vocalist	Won

== Grammy Awards ==
The Grammy Awards are awarded annually by the National Academy of Recording Arts and Sciences. Lauper won two awards from 16 nominations.

Year	Nominee / work	Award	Result
1985	Cyndi Lauper	Best New Artist	Won
1985	She's So Unusual	Album of the Year	Nominated
1985	"Time After Time"	Song of the Year	Nominated
1985	"Girls Just Want To Have Fun"	Record of the Year	Nominated
1985	"Girls Just Want To Have Fun"	Best Female Pop Vocal Performance	Nominated
1986	"What A Thrill"	Best Female Rock Vocal Performance	Nominated
1987	"True Colors"	Best Female Pop Vocal Performance	Nominated
1987	"911"	Best Female Rock Vocal Performance	Nominated
1988	"Cyndi Lauper in Paris"	Best Performance Music Video	Nominated
1990	"I Drove All Night"	Best Female Rock Vocal Performance	Nominated
1999	"Disco Inferno"	Best Dance Recording	Nominated
2005	"Unchained Melody"	Best Instrumental Arrangement Accompanying Vocalist(s)	Nominated
2009	Bring Ya To The Brink	Best Electronic/Dance Album	Nominated
2011	Memphis Blues	Best Traditional Blues Album	Nominated
2014	Kinky Boots (Broadway Cast)	Best Musical Theater Album	Won
2017	Kinky Boots (West End Cast)	Best Musical Theater Album	Nominated

Note: "She's So Unusual" also won Best Album Package in 1985. Best Album Package is credited to the art director and not the performer, The art director was Janet Perr.

Note: "We Are the World" (which featured Cyndi Lauper as a vocalist) also won Song of the Year, Record of the Year, Best Music Video, Short Form, and Best Pop Performance by a Duo or Group with Vocal in 1986. Song of the Year is credited to the songwriters and not the performer, The song was written by Michael Jackson and Lionel Richie. Record of the Year and Best Pop Performance by a Duo or Group were presented to the producer in 1986, the song was produced by Quincy Jones. Best Music Video, Short Form is presented to the director and producer, Tom Trbovich directed the video while Quincy Jones served as producer.

== MTV Video Music Award ==
The MTV Video Music Awards were established in 1984 by MTV to celebrate the top music videos of the year. Lauper won three awards from 16 nominations, being the first win in the category Best Female Video.

Year	Nominee / work	Award	Result
1984	"Girls Just Want to Have Fun"	Video of the Year	Nominated
1984	"Girls Just Want to Have Fun"	Best New Artist	Nominated
1984	"Girls Just Want to Have Fun"	Best Female Video	Won
1984	"Girls Just Want to Have Fun"	Best Concept Video	Nominated
1984	"Girls Just Want to Have Fun"	Viewer's Choice	Nominated
1984	"Girls Just Want to Have Fun"	Best Overall Performance	Nominated
1984	"Time After Time"	Best New Artist	Nominated
1984	"Time After Time"	Best Female Video	Nominated
1984	"Time After Time"	Best Direction	Nominated
1985	"We Are the World"	Video of the Year	Nominated
1985	"We Are the World"	Best Group Video	Won
1985	"We Are the World"	Viewer's Choice	Won
1985	"We Are the World"	Best Overall Performance	Nominated
1985	"She Bop"	Best Female Video	Nominated
1987	"True Colors"	Best Female Video	Nominated
1987	"What's Going On"	Best Cinematography	Nominated

== Smash Hits Poll Winners Party ==
The Smash Hits Poll Winners Party was an awards ceremony held annually by British magazine Smash Hits, and broadcast on BBC One.

Year	Nominee / work	Award	Result
1984	Herself	Most Fanciable Female	Nominated
1984	Herself	Best Female Singer	Nominated
1985	Herself	Best Female Singer	Nominated
1985	Herself	Worst Female Singer	Nominated
1986	Herself	Worst Dressed Person	Nominated
1986	Herself	Best Female Singer	Nominated
1987	Herself	Worst Female Singer	Nominated
1994	Herself	Worst Female Singer	Nominated
1994	Herself	Best Female Solo Singer	Nominated

== Other awards ==
Year	Awards	Work	Category	Result
1983	American Video Awards	"Girls Just Want to Have Fun"	Best Female Performance	Won
1983	Performance Magazine Awards	Herself	Most Promising Female Vocalist	Won
1984	Performance Magazine Awards	Herself	Pop Breakout of the Year	Won
1984	NARM Awards	She's So Unusual	Best Selling Album by a New Artist	Won
1984	NARM Awards	She's So Unusual	Best Selling Album by a Female Artist	Won
1984	Juno Awards	"Girls Just Want to Have Fun"	Best Selling Single	Nominated
1984	Ms. Magazine	Herself	Woman of the Year	Won
1984	American Video Awards	"Time After Time"	Best Female Performance	Won
1984	American Video Awards	"Time After Time"	Best Pop Video	Won
1985	Pro Canada Awards	"Time After Time"	Most Performed Foreign Song	Won
1985	Pollstar Concert Industry Awards	Herself	Favorite New Headliner of the Year	Nominated
1985	Rolling Stone Awards	Herself	Best New Artist	Won
1985	Rolling Stone Awards	Herself	Best Female Video Artist	Won
1985	Women in Film Crystal + Lucy Awards	Herself	New Directions Award	Won
1985	American Music Awards	Herself	Favorite Pop/Rock Female Artist	Won
1985	American Music Awards	Herself	Favorite Pop/Rock Female Video Artist	Won
1986	American Music Awards	"We Are The World"	Song of the Year	Nominated
1986	People's Choice Awards	"We Are The World"	Favorite New Song	Won
1986	Slammy Awards	Herself	Best Producer	Won
1986	ASCAP Pop Music Awards	"Time After Time"	Most Performed Song	Won
1987	Japan Gold Disc Awards	True Colors	Best Album of the Year – Rock/Folk	Won
1988	New York Music Awards	Herself	Best Female Rock Vocalist	Won
1988	Photography Awards	"What's Going On"	Best Art Direction	Won
1988	Art Directors' Club 67th Annual Exhibition	"What's Going On"	Merit Award	Won
1989	FM Tokyo Pop Best 10	"I Drove All Night"	Song of the Year	Won
1993	Ms. Magazine	Herself	Woman of the Year	Won
1994	Emmy Awards	Mad About You	Outstanding Guest Actress in a Comedy Series	Nominated
1995	Emmy Awards	Mad About You	Outstanding Guest Actress in a Comedy Series	Won
1996	IFPI Platinum Europe Awards	Twelve Deadly Cyns...and Then Some	Award Level 1	Won
1996	Apex Awards	"Unhook the Stars"	Original Song Comedy	Nominated
2000	Apex Awards	"I Want a Mom That Will Last Forever"	Original Song Comedy	Nominated
2000	Fennecus Awards	"I Want a Mom That Will Last Forever"	Original Song	Nominated
2000	Fennecus Awards	"I Want a Mom That Will Last Forever"	Song Performance	Nominated
2005	Telecom Mobile Music Awards	"Girls Just Want to Have Fun"	Gold Award	Won
2005	PFLAG Awards	Herself	Celebrity Leadership Award	Won
2007	HRC Awards	Herself	National Equality Award	Won
2009	Black Tie Awards	Herself	Media Award	Won
2009	Out 100 Awards	Herself	Ally of the Year	Won
2010	GLSEN The Respect Awards	Herself	Inspiration Award	Won
2010	NARM Awards	Herself	Chairman's Award	Won
2011	OUTMUSIC Awards	Herself	Person of the Year	Won
2011	Ride of Fame	Herself	Inductee	Won
2011	New York Music Awards	Herself	Best Female Blues Artist	Won
2011	New York Music Awards	Memphis Blues	Best Blues Album	Won
2013	Tony Awards	Kinky Boots	Best Original Score	Won
2013	Outer Critics Circle Awards	Kinky Boots	Outstanding New Score	Won
2015	Songwriters Hall of Fame	Herself	Inductee	Won
2015	Annie Awards	Henry & Me	Outstanding Achievement in Voice Acting in an Animated Feature Production	Nominated
2016	Laurence Olivier Awards	Kinky Boots	Outstanding Achievement in Music	Nominated
2016	Hollywood Walk of Fame	Herself	Recording	Won
2017	VH1 Trailblazer Honor	Herself	Honoree	Won
2017	British LGBT Awards	Kinky Boots	Media Moment	Nominated
2020	Queerty Awards	Herself	Straight Best Friend	Pending
2025	Rock and Roll Hall of Fame	Herself	Inductee	Won

== BMI Awards ==
The Broadcast Music, Incorporated (BMI) Awards is an annual award show hosted for the purpose of giving awards to songwriters. Songwriters are selected each year from the entire BMI catalog, based on the number of performances during the award period.

- 1984 – Pop Award for "Time After Time" (Won)
- 1985 – Pop Award for "She Bop" (Won)
- 1988 – Pop Award for "Change Of Heart" (Won)
- 2008 – BMI Millionaire Award for 5 Million Spins on US radio for "Time After Time" (Won)
- 2009 – Pop Award for "Time After Time" (Won)

== Other recognitions ==
Year	By	List	Work	Ranked
1993	Rolling Stone	The 100 Top Music Videos	"Girls Just Want To Have Fun"	#22
1999	VH1	100 Greatest Women of Rock & Roll	Cyndi Lauper	#58
1999	MTV	100 Greatest Videos Ever Made	"Girls Just Want To Have Fun"	#39
1999	Rolling Stone	100 Best Albums of the '80s	She's So Unusual	#75
2000	Rolling Stone	100 Greatest Pop Songs	"Time After Time"	#66
2000	MTV	100 Greatest Pop Songs	"Time After Time"	#66
2001	VH1	100 Greatest Videos	"Girls Just Want To Have Fun"	#45
2002	Rolling Stone	50 Essential "Women In Rock" Albums	She's So Unusual	#41
2003	VH1	100 Best Songs of the Past 25 Years	"Time After Time"	#22
2003	Rolling Stone	The 500 Greatest Albums of All Time	She's So Unusual	#494
2006	VH1	100 Greatest Songs of the 80's	"Time After Time"	#19
2006	VH1	100 Greatest Songs of the 80's	"Girls Just Want To Have Fun"	#23
2019	Library of Congress	National Recording Registry	She's So Unusual	
