= JBTV =

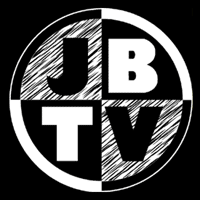
- Created by: Jerry Bryant
- Starring: Jerry Bryant (Host); Greg Corner (Co-Host)
- Country of origin: United States

Production
- Executive producer: Jerry Bryant
- Camera setup: Sony HDW-F900, Sony PMW-EX3, Sony PDW-350 XDCAM, Sony Z1U
- Running time: 60 minutes (Saturdays, 7:00pm, 8:00pm and 10:00pm, Sundays, 7:00pm and 8pm, Wednesdays, 11:00pm)
- Production company: JBTV Studios

Original release
- Network: WGBO, Ch. 66, (1986-1994); WCIU, Ch. 26, (1995); WJYS, Ch. 62, (1996-Present)
- Release: present

JBTV (a.k.a. JBTV Music Television) is a Chicago-area broadcast, weekly 60-minute music television show featuring live in-studio performances, music videos, and music-related interviews from emerging and established musicians. Based in Chicago, Illinois, JBTV has over a 30-year history. It was created and hosted by Jerry Bryant in 1986. As of the show's 32nd season, Jerry Bryant and Greg Corner are the show's main hosts.

The show is broadcast locally on WJYS-TV in Chicago on Saturday at 1am CT, on both the main channel at 62.1, and the third sub-channel at 62.4, which carries Heartland, with re-broadcast on Wednesday at 11:30pm CT on the second sub-channel at 62.3, which carries Charge!. It posts all of its aired content on its website, as well as exclusive, live streams of in-studio performances and behind-the-scenes footage showcasing visiting bands and the show's production team.

== Format ==
Original format (1986–2016)

In its original format a band or solo performer would visit the JBTV studio for an interview with owner and host Jerry Bryant, selecting a number of music videos (both the artist's and their own favorite videos) that would be shown in the aired episode. JBTV is currently on broadcast television WJYS-62 in Chicago Wednesday nights at 11pm with New Music Videos and live JBTV performances. JBTV is currently hosting live in-studio performances with new artists and established bands.

== Broadcast schedule ==
JBTV is broadcast weekly on WJYS. Episodes air weekly on Saturday nights at 1am CT on Ch. 62.1 & 62.4, with re-airing on Wednesday nights at 11:30pm CT on Ch. 62.3

== Notable guests ==
0-9

- The 1975
- 311

A

- Abandoned Pools
- The Afghan Whigs
- Against Me!
- Airborne Toxic Event
- Alanis Morissette
- Alkaline Trio
- Alpine
- Alt-J
- Amanda Palmer
- American Authors
- Andrew W.K.
- Angels and Airwaves
- Anti Flag
- Apocalyptica
- Ariana and the Rose
- Arkells
- Atlas Genius
- Awolnation

B

- Bad Religion
- Band of Skulls
- Banks
- Barcelona
- Barenaked Ladies
- Bastille
- Battleme
- Bear Hands
- Bear Mountain
- Ben Folds Five
- Beware of Darkness
- Biffy Clyro
- Big Data
- Billy Corgan
- Björk
- Bleachers
- Bosnian Rainbows
- BTS
- Bowling for Soup
- Brick + Mortar
- Bullet For My Valentine

C

- Cage the Elephant
- Cake
- Charli XCX
- Cheap Trick
- Chris Isaak
- Cold War Kids

D

- Dan Black
- The Dandy Warhols
- Dave Matthews Band
- A Day To Remember
- Disturbed
- Dead Sara
- Dead To Me
- Death Cab for Cutie
- Dredg
- Dropkick Murphys

E

- Eagulls
- EL VY
- Emilie Autumn
- Erasure
- Everclear

F

- Fall Out Boy
- Finch
- Finger Eleven
- Fitz and the Tantrums
- The Flaming Lips
- Flatfoot 56
- Flobots
- Foster the People
- Fountains of Wayne
- Foxy Shazam
- Freelance Whales

G

- Garbage
- Gary Numan
- The Gaslight Anthem
- Goldfinger
- Goo Goo Dolls
- Green Day
- Grouplove

H

- Hippo Campus
- Hot Hot Heat
- Hozier

I

- I:Scintilla
- I Fight Dragons
- Imagine Dragons
- Incubus
- INXS

J

- J Roddy Walston and the Business
- Janus
- JC Brooks & the Uptown Sound
- Jeff Buckley
- Jewel
- Jimmy Eat World
- JR JR
- Juliana Hatfield
- July Talk

K

- Kate Bush
- K.Flay
- Kill Hannah
- Kongos

L

- Ladyhawke
- The Lawrence Arms
- Less Than Jake
- Local H
- Lucky Boys Confusion

M

- Maps & Atlases
- Martin Atkins
- Megadeth
- The Menzingers
- MGMT
- Minus the Bear
- Moby
- Moving Units
- The Mowgli's

N

- Ned's Atomic Dustbin
- Niki and the Dove
- Nneka
- No Doubt
- NOFX

O

- Oasis
- OK Go
- Of Mice & Men
- Of Monsters and Men
- The Offspring
- The Orwells

P

- Panic! at the Disco
- Papa Roach
- The Peach Kings
- Phoebe Ryan
- Pearl Jam
- Phantogram
- PJ Harvey
- Plain White Ts
- Portugal. The Man
- Poster Children

R

- Radiohead
- Joey Ramone
- Rise Against
- Riverboat Gamblers
- Henry Rollins

S

- Semi Precious Weapons
- The Shins
- Silverchair
- Silversun Pickups
- Skinny Puppy
- Slayer
- Smashing Pumpkins
- Smallpools
- Smoking Popes
- The So So Glos
- Sonic Youth
- Street Dogs
- The Struts
- The Sword
- System of a Down

T

- Taylor Bennett
- They Might Be Giants
- Thirty Seconds to Mars
- The Ting Tings
- Tori Amos
- Tove Lo
- Trashcan Sinatras
- Twenty One Pilots
- Twin Peaks

U

- Unwritten Law

V

- The Verve

W

- The Whigs
- Wilco
- The Wombats

X

- X Ambassadors

Y

- Yelawolf

Z

- Zwan

== Awards ==
- Billboard - Best Local/Regional Alternative Modern Rock Show (Twice)
- Chicago/Midwest Emmy-Outstanding Achievement for Individual Excellence Off Camera: Art Direction and Graphics/Animation - 2010
- Chicago/Midwest Emmy-2014 Silver Circle recipient for 25+ years of service
