= Kinky boots =

Kinky boots are boots, usually thigh-high boots, associated with boot fetishism.

Kinky Boots may also refer to:

- Kinky Boots (film), a 2005 British film
  - Kinky Boots (musical), a 2012 American musical, based on the 2005 film
    - Kinky Boots (Broadway cast album), a cast album from the musical
- "Kinky Boots" (song), a 1964 song
- "Kinky Boots" (2000 song), a 2000 Irish Rebel song by The Irish Brigade
