= Early Christmas Morning =

Single by Cyndi Lauper

from the album Merry Christmas...Have a Nice Life and also Sisters of Avalon
- Released: 1998
- Recorded: 1996
- Genre: Pop
- Length: 5:06 (Album Version)
- Label: Epic
- Songwriters: Cyndi Lauper, Jan Pulsford
- Producers: Cyndi Lauper, Mark Saunders, Jan Pulsford

Cyndi Lauper singles chronology
"Ballad of Cleo and Joe" (1997)	"Early Christmas Morning" (1998)	"Disco Inferno" (1999)

"Early Christmas Morning" is a song by American recording artist Cyndi Lauper, from her sixth studio album and first Christmas album, Merry Christmas...Have a Nice Life (1998). Written by Lauper along with Jan Pulsford in 1996. It was only officially released in Japan.

There are two versions of the song. The second version includes a children's choir instead of the Japanese vocals used in the first version.

The track now appears on several Christmas compilation albums in the United Kingdom and Canada, including Holiday Wishes Favourites released in 2009 by Sony Music Entertainment.

== Track list ==
Japan CD single

1. Early Christmas Morning (radio edit) – 4:26
