= Sisters of Avalon (song) =

Single by Cyndi Lauper

from the album Sisters of Avalon
- B-side: "Unhook the Stars"
- Released: January 29, 1997
- Recorded: 1996
- Genre: Alternative rock
- Length: 4:20
- Label: Epic Records
- Songwriters: Cyndi Lauper; Jan Pulsford
- Producers: Cyndi Lauper; Mark Saunders; Jan Pulsford

Cyndi Lauper singles chronology
"You Don't Know" (1996)	"Sisters of Avalon" (1997)	"Ballad of Cleo and Joe" (1997)

Music video
- "Sisters of Avalon" on YouTube

"Sisters of Avalon" is a single from the 1997 album of the same name, by American singer Cyndi Lauper. This single was only released in Japan. A sampler was released as a promo only CD in the United States.

== Song information ==
The song is about sisterhood and it shows the power of women Lauper wanted to show through the song and the album as a whole. As a result of the song, Lauper wanted to work with female writers and producers during a lot of the making of the album.

== Track listing ==
Japan CD Single
1. "Sisters of Avalon" (single edit) - 3:46
2. "Sisters of Avalon" (album version) - 4:21
3. "Unhook the Stars" (album version) - 3:58

== Official versions ==
1. Album version
2. Single edit – 3:46
3. Extended version
