= She's So Unusual: 30th Anniversary Tour =

2013 concert tour by Cyndi Lauper

- Tour by Cyndi Lauper
- Promotional poster for tour
- Associated album: She's So Unusual (30th anniversary)
- Start date: June 12, 2013
- End date: November 16, 2013
- Legs: 4
- No. of shows: 44 in North America; 2 in Asia; 10 in Australia; 56 total

Cyndi Lauper concert chronology
- Memphis Blues Tour (2010–11); She's So Unusual: 30th Anniversary Tour (2013); Detour Tour (2016)

The She's So Unusual: 30th Anniversary Tour (also known as the She's So Unusual Tour) was the twelfth concert tour by American recording artist Cyndi Lauper. Launched to mark the anniversary of her debut solo album, the tour visited North America, Asia and Australia.

== Background ==
It's been such an amazing year for me. When I realized it's also the anniversary of the album that started my solo career, I knew it was the perfect time to thank my fans for sticking with me through it all. I'm so excited to perform She's So Unusual from beginning to end, song by song and I can't wait to see everyone!

The tour was announced via Lauper's website on April 8, 2013. Dubbed as a celebration for fans, the shows will pay tribute to the singer's debut album, released October 14, 1983. Along with the tour, it was also reported Lauper's play, Kinky Boots, released 13 Tony nominations. During an interview with VH1's Big Morning Buzz Live, the singer stated she never saw herself doing an "oldies tour" reliving the glory days. However, she felt compelled to thank her fans for supporting her career for 30 years. She went to say the show was "more for them than me". She also revealed she will perform every track from the album, along with her other hits. On June 3, 2013, Raymond J. Lee released a video for various television presenters and actors lip-syncing her hit "Girls Just Wanna Have Fun". The video featured Kelly Ripa, Rosie O’Donnell, Whoopi Goldberg, Katie Couric, Hoda Kotb and Kathie Lee Gifford; along with the casts of Kinky Boots, The Lion King, Cinderella, The Phantom of the Opera, Spider-Man: Turn Off the Dark and Chicago.

== Opening acts ==
- Hunter Valentine (North America)

== Setlist ==
The following setlist is obtained from the concert held at Humphrey's Concerts by the Bay. It is not representative of all dates on the tour.

Act I: She's So Unusual

1. "Money Changes Everything"
2. "Girls Just Want to Have Fun"
3. "When You Were Mine"
4. "Time After Time"
5. "She Bop"
6. "All Through the Night"
7. "Witness"
8. "I'll Kiss You"
9. "He's So Unusual"
10. "Yeah Yeah"

11. "The Goonies 'R' Good Enough"

Encore

12. "Change of Heart"
13. "Shine"
14. "Sex is in the Heel"
15. "True Colors"

== Tour dates ==
Date	City	Country	Venue
North America
June 12, 2013	San Diego	United States	Humphrey's Concerts by the Bay
June 13, 2013	Los Angeles	United States	Greek Theatre
June 15, 2013	Jacksonville	United States	Britt Pavilion
June 16, 2013	Tacoma	United States	Pantages Theater
June 18, 2013	Sacramento	United States	Crest Theatre
June 19, 2013	Saratoga	United States	Mountain Winery Amphitheatre
June 21, 2013	Temecula	United States	Pechanga Showroom Theater
June 22, 2013	Scottsdale	United States	Salt River Grand Ballroom
June 23, 2013	Tucson	United States	Fox Tucson Theatre
June 25, 2013	Austin	United States	Waller Creek Amphitheatre
June 26, 2013	Dallas	United States	House of Blues
June 28, 2013	Houston	United States	House of Blues
June 29, 2013	Biloxi	United States	Hard Rock Live
June 30, 2013	New Orleans	United States	House of Blues
July 2, 2013	Atlanta	United States	Atlanta Symphony Hall
July 3, 2013	North Charleston	United States	North Charleston Performing Arts Center
July 5, 2013	Portsmouth	United States	nTelos Wireless Pavilion
July 6, 2013	Atlantic City	United States	Etess Arena
July 7, 2013	Newark	United States	Prudential Hall
July 9, 2013	New Bedford	United States	Zeiterion Performing Arts Center
July 10, 2013	New York City	United States	Beacon Theatre
July 12, 2013	Port Chester	United States	Capitol Theatre
July 13, 2013	Leynard	United States	MGM Grand Theater
Asia
August 10, 2013^{[A]}	Tokyo	Japan	Summer Sonic
August 11, 2013^{[A]}	Chiba	Japan	Makuhari Messe
Australia
August 29, 2013	Melbourne	Australia	Palais Theatre
August 30, 2013	Melbourne	Australia	Palais Theatre
August 31, 2013	Canberra	Australia	Royal Theatre
September 2, 2013	Hobart	Australia	Wrest Point Entertainment Centre
September 4, 2013	Adelaide	Australia	Festival Theatre
September 6, 2013	Sydney	Australia	Enmore Theatre
September 7, 2013	Sydney	Australia	Enmore Theatre
September 9, 2013	Gold Coast	Australia	Jupiters Theatre
September 11, 2013	Brisbane	Australia	QPAC Concert Hall
September 14, 2013	Wollongong	Australia	WIN Entertainment Centre
North America
October 18, 2013	Englewood	United States	Bergen Performing Arts Center
October 19, 2013	Boston	United States	Wang Theatre
October 20, 2013	New York City	United States	Kupferberg Center for the Arts
October 22, 2013	Wilkes-Barre	United States	F.M. Kirby Center for the Performing Arts
October 23, 2013	New Brunswick	United States	State Theatre
October 25, 2013	Lebanon	United States	Lebanon Opera House
October 26, 2013	Montreal	Canada	Métropolis
October 27, 2013	Toronto	Canada	Massey Hall
October 29, 2013	Madison	United States	Capitol Theater
October 30, 2013	Minneapolis	United States	Mill City Nights
November 1, 2013	Chicago	United States	Chicago Theatre
November 3, 2013	Greensburg	United States	Palace Theatre
November 5, 2013	Nashville	United States	Andrew Jackson Hall
November 6, 2013	Knoxville	United States	Tennessee Theatre
November 8, 2013	Clearwater	United States	Ruth Eckerd Hall
November 9, 2013	Hollywood	United States	Hard Rock Live
November 10, 2013	Orlando	United States	House of Blues
November 12, 2013	Charlotte	United States	Belk Theater
November 13, 2013	Washington, D.C.	United States	Warner Theatre
November 15, 2013	Glenside	United States	Keswick Theatre
November 16, 2013	Ridgefield	United States	Ridgefield Playhouse

=== Box office score data ===
Venue	City	Tickets sold / available	Gross revenue
Greek Theatre	Los Angeles	5,132 / 5,132 (100%)	$237,528
Waller Creek Amphitheatre	Austin	2,181 / 2,200 (99%)	$82,190
North Charleston Performing Arts Center	North Charleston	1,852 / 2,341 (79%)	$75,893
Prudential Hall	Newark	1,876 / 2,724 (69%)	$104,746
Beacon Theatre	New York City	2,796 / 2,796 (100%)	$166,710
Capitol Theater	Madison	1,034 / 1,034 (100%)	$51,353
Mill City Nights	Minneapolis	937 / 1,070 (88%)	$46,903
Chicago Theatre	Chicago	3,077 / 3,351 (92%)	$172,951
Ruth Eckerd Hall	Clearwater	1,395 / 1,980 (70%)	$87,423
TOTAL		20,280 / 22,628 (90%)	$1,025,697
