= You Don't Know (Cyndi Lauper song) =

Single by Cyndi Lauper

from the album Sisters of Avalon
- B-side: "Mother" (Extended Mix)
- Released: September 26, 1996
- Recorded: 1996
- Genre: Rock; pop
- Length: 5:14
- Label: Epic
- Songwriters: Cyndi Lauper; Jan Pulsford
- Producers: Cyndi Lauper; Jan Pulsford; Mark Saunders

Cyndi Lauper singles chronology
"Come On Home" (1995)	"You Don't Know" (1996)	"Sisters of Avalon" (1997)

Music video
- "You Don't Know" on YouTube

"You Don't Know" is a song by American singer-songwriter Cyndi Lauper, released in September 1996, by Epic Records, as the first single from Lauper's fifth album, Sisters of Avalon (1997). Remixes of the song were made by several producers such as Tony Moran and Junior Vasquez. It peaked at number 27 in the UK, while peaking at number 16 on the US Billboard Hot Dance Club Play chart. The song contains the word "bullshit" and was not edited out of the UK singles as is typical. While performing on several UK shows, such as Noel's House Party, she skipped the word. The music video for the song was directed by Lauper.

== Critical reception ==
Larry Flick from Billboard magazine wrote, "Lauper unveils her new Sisters Of Avalon collection, offering a tune that is far more biting and intelligent than fluffy past hits like 'Girls Just Want to Have Fun' and 'She Bop'. If programmers can move beyond the singer's old cartoonish image, they will discover an artist and music worthy of placement alongside the likes of Alanis Morissette." He added further, "The original version of 'You Don't Know' unfolds with a jittery funk beat and jangly guitars that deserve a listen at modern rock radio. Redrafted by Tony Moran, the song becomes an anthemic disco revelation that popsters will love. Add the underground club perspective of remixers Prince Quick Mix and Junior Vasquez, and you have a single that aims to hit every possible mark. The next step is for people to listen."

Kevin Courtney from Irish Times said, "The unusual girl is back at last, and that Hazel O'Connor-on-helium voice still has that girlie edge, but as the song builds in intensity, she sounds in danger of totally eclipsing Bonnie Tyler in the overkill department, and when she prances around in her new video, she looks like she's stuck in a jerky 1980s movement. A pleasant, nondescript attempt at resurgence from a lady out of time." Caroline Sullivan from The Guardian commented, "And who else could endow the word 'bullshit' with such fervour while denouncing US politics on 'You Don't Know'?" A reviewer from Music Week gave it a score of four out of five, noting that "Lauper's trademark vocal performance is more restrained for this nicely produced, acoustic-style pop song. A certain airplay hit, expect massive sales success, too."

== Music video ==
The accompanying music video for the song was recorded in Washington Square, New York City in the beginning of September 1996. Lauper directed it herself. The little Japanese boy who closes the video is called Grayson. The 6-year-old boy was hand-picked by Lauper.

== Track listing ==
- US CD single
1. "You Don't Know" (Radio Edit) – 4:06
2. "You Don't Know" (TM's Single Remix) – 4:23
3. "That's What I Think" – 4:38
- US CD maxi-single
1. "You Don't Know" (Single Mix) - 4:06
2. "You Don't Know" (TM's Single Remix) - 4:23
3. "You Don't Know" (Junior Vasquez Remix Edit) - 3:34
4. "You Don't Know" (TM's Know It All Mix) - 10:06
5. "You Don't Know" (Junior Vasquez Remix) - 7:51
- Japanese CD single
1. "You Don't Know" (Radio Edit) – 3:59
2. "You Don't Know" (Album Version) – 5:14
3. "Mother" (Extended Version) – 6:11
- European CD single
1. "You Don't Know" (Album Version) - 5:14
2. "Mother" (Extended Mix) - 6:12
- UK CD single (The Junior Vasquez Mixes) / European CD maxi-single
1. "You Don't Know" (Radio Edit) – 4:06
2. "You Don't Know" (Junior Vasquez Remix) – 7:45
3. "You Don't Know" (Junior Vasquez Dub) – 6:45
4. "Mother" (Extended Mix) – 6:12
- UK Limited Edition CD single
1. "You Don't Know" (Album Version) - 5:13
2. "Time After Time" - 3:58
3. "True Colors" - 3:46
4. "I Drove All Night" - 4:11
- Australian CD single
1. "You Don't Know" (Radio Edit) - 4:06
2. "You Don't Know" (Junior Vasquez Remix) - 7:51
3. "You Don't Know" (Tribal Beats) - 4:33
4. "Mother" (Extended Mix) - 6:12
- US 12"

A1. "You Don't Know" (TM's Know It All Mix) - 10:00
A2. "You Don't Know" (TM's Know You're in the Hole Dub) - 5:30
B1. "You Don't Know" (Prince Quick Mix's Amped Up Pass) - 6:35
B2. "You Don't Know" (Junior's Riff Dub) - 6:09

- European 12"

A1. "You Don't Know" (Junior Vasquez Remix Edit) - 3:44
A2. "You Don't Know" (Junior Vasquez Remix) - 7:51
A3. "You Don't Know" (Junior Vasquez Dub) - 6:46
B1. "You Don't Know" (Album Version) - 5:14
B2. "You Don't Know" (TM's Single Remix) - 4:23
B3. "You Don't Know" (TM's Know It All Mix) - 10:06
B4. "You Don't Know" (TM's Know You're in the Hole Dub) - 5:33

== Official versions ==
1. Junior Vasquez Dub – 6:45
2. Junior Vasquez Remix Edit – 3:34
3. Junior's Riff Dub – 6:09
4. Prince Quick Mix's Amped Up Pass – 6:35
5. Radio edit – 3:59
6. Tony Moran's Know It All Mix – 10:00
7. Tony Moran's Know You're in the Hole Dub – 5:30
8. Tony Moran's Single Remix – 4:23
9. Tribal Beats – 4:33

== Charts ==
Chart (1997)	Peak position
Australia (ARIA)	177
Europe Airplay (European Hit Radio)	47
Italy Airplay (Music & Media)	6
Poland Airplay (Music & Media)	4
Scotland (OCC)	25
UK Singles (OCC)	27
US Bubbling Under Hot 100 Singles (Billboard)	11
US Hot Dance Club Play (Billboard)	16
US Hot Dance Music/Maxi Singles Sales (Billboard)	16

== Release history ==
Release dates and formats for "You Don't Know"
Region	Date	Label(s)	Format(s)	Cat. No.	Ref(s).
Japan	September 26, 1996	Epic	CD	ESCA 6585	
United Kingdom	January 20, 1997	Epic	Cassette; CD1; CD2	6641844; 6641842; 6641845	
United States	March 18, 1997	Epic	Contemporary hit radio	—N/a	
