= Ballad of Cleo and Joe =

Single by Cyndi Lauper

from the album Sisters of Avalon
- Released: September 16, 1997
- Recorded: 1996
- Genre: Electropop; techno
- Length: 3:59
- Label: Epic
- Songwriters: Cyndi Lauper; Jan Pulsford
- Producers: Cyndi Lauper; Mark Saunders; Jan Pulsford

Cyndi Lauper singles chronology
"Sisters of Avalon" (1997)	"Ballad of Cleo and Joe" (1997)	"Early Christmas Morning" (1998)

Music video
- "Ballad of Cleo & Joe" on YouTube

"Ballad of Cleo and Joe" is a song by American singer-songwriter Cyndi Lauper, released as the third single from her fifth studio album, Sisters of Avalon (1996). The song was written by Lauper and Jan Pulsford, and produced by Pulsford, Mark Saunders and Lauper. It was released on September 16, 1997, by Epic Records. Lyrically, the song describes the double life of a drag queen, the titular 'Joe' (by day) and 'Cleo' (by night). It received positive reviews from music critics. The song did not enter the US Billboard Hot 100, but debuted at number 24 on the Billboard Bubbling Under Hot 100 Singles chart.

== Background ==
In early 1996, Lauper began working on what would be Sisters of Avalon. Thematically the album expounded on the issue of complacency and ignorance in popular culture and the discrimination of minorities, gays, and women. "Ballad of Cleo and Joe" is a song about the double life of a cross dresser. The song is about the double life of a drag queen, the titular 'Joe' (by day) and 'Cleo' (by night). This song was one of the many songs on the album that was about a taboo subject.

== Critical reception ==
Larry Flick from Billboard magazine wrote, "It is downright criminal that Lauper's current Sisters Of Avalon set is not a huge hit. It's chock-full of rhythm-smart, lyrically sharp jams like 'The Ballad of Cleo And Joe', which sparks with a credible house beat and an enthralling tale of a couple just trying to get by in the naked city. Lauper's sterling composition is enhanced by the time-sensitive post-production of Ernie Lake and Bobby Guy, who juice up the bassline, tweak the chorus, and mold a few simple refrains into rousing riot chants. Support this record. After years of warbling about goonies and girls just wanting to have fun, Lauper has hit creative pay dirt."

Bob Cannon from Entertainment Weekly gave the song a B, adding, "Lauper's a dance diva, this pounding slice of electro-pop would have us believe. But she has too much personality to disappear into an anonymous dance mix. Having dropped her Betty Boop mannerisms, she sounds earthier than usual, giving 'Cleo & Joe'—an homage to a drag queen—the gospelish feel of early Donna Summer."

== Music video ==
A music video was released for the song, featuring a pregnant Lauper rotating on a platform with her stomach decorated to look like a disco ball. The video received play primarily in clubs.

== Track listing ==
- US CD single
1. "Ballad of Cleo and Joe" (Soul Solution Radio Edit) – 3:54
2. "Ballad of Cleo and Joe" (Soul Solution Vocal Dub) – 8:46
3. "Ballad of Cleo and Joe" (Soul Solution Tribal Dub) – 3:35
4. "Ballad of Cleo and Joe" (Soul Solution Instrumental) – 8:51
5. "Ballad of Cleo and Joe" – 3:59

== Charts ==
Chart (1997)	Peak position
US Bubbling Under Hot 100 Singles (Billboard)	24
US Hot Dance Club Play (Billboard)	36
US Hot Dance Singles Sales (Billboard)	43
Dance Music Authority Top 50	4
