= Merry Christmas ... Have a Nice Life =

Studio album by Cyndi Lauper
- Released: October 27, 1998
- Recorded: 1993–1998
- Genre: Christmas music
- Length: 41:59
- Label: Epic
- Producers: Cyndi Lauper; Jan Pulsford; Junior Vasquez; William Wittman

Cyndi Lauper chronology
Sisters of Avalon (1996)	Merry Christmas ... Have a Nice Life (1998)	Shine (2002)

Singles from Merry Christmas ... Have a Nice Life
- 1. "Early Christmas Morning" Released: 1998

Professional ratings
Review scores
Source	Rating
AllMusic	3/5 stars
Los Angeles Times	3.5/4 stars

Merry Christmas ... Have a Nice Life is the sixth studio album and first Christmas album released by Cyndi Lauper. It combines original compositions by Lauper and collaborator Jan Pulsford with traditional Christmas songs. "Feels Like Christmas" previously appeared on Lauper's 1993 album Hat Full of Stars. The album has sold 26,000 copies in the United States, according to Nielsen SoundScan. The album was released for the first time on (limited green) vinyl, 1,000 pressings, in November 2019.

== Track listing ==
1. "Home on Christmas Day" (Rob Hyman, Cyndi Lauper, William Wittman) – 4:06
2. "Early Christmas Morning" (Lauper, Jan Pulsford) – 5:07 (Previously released on Sisters of Avalon Japanese Edition, this version uses different backing vocals)
3. "Rockin' Around the Christmas Tree" (Johnny Marks) – 2:45
4. "Christmas Conga" (Lauper, Pulsford) – 3:31
5. "Minnie and Santa" (Lauper, Pulsford) – 3:55
6. "Feels Like Christmas" (Eric Bazilian, Hyman, Lauper) – 4:30 (Previously released on Hat Full of Stars)
7. "Three Ships" (Traditional) – 2:08
8. "New Year's Baby (First Lullaby)" (Lauper) – 4:27
9. "December Child" (Lauper, Pulsford) – 3:11
10. "In the Bleak Midwinter" (Gustav Holst, Christina Rossetti) – 4:02
11. "Silent Night" (Franz Gruber, Josef Mohr) – 4:18

All tracks produced by Cyndi Lauper, Jan Pulsford and William Wittman except:

- "Early Christmas Morning" produced by Cyndi Lauper, Jan Pulsford and Mark Saunders
- "Home on Christmas Day" and "Rockin' Around the Christmas Tree" produced by Cyndi Lauper and William Wittman
- "Feels Like Christmas" produced by Cyndi Lauper and Junior Vasquez

== Personnel ==
- Cyndi Lauper – lead vocals, background vocals (4, 8), rhythm guitar (1), dulcimer (1, 7), omnichord banjo (5), drums (5), clogging (7), tin whistle (7, 10), recorder (7, 9), slide baritone ukele (8)
- Rob Hyman – synths (1), backing vocals (1), organ (3), melodica (3), beatbox (3), accordion (4, 7)
- William Wittman – 12-string guitar (1), electric bass guitar (1, 3, 5, 8), backing vocals (1, 3), organ (1), drums (1), omnichord (3), additional recording (11)
- Jan Pulsford – loops (1, 4, 8), synths (4, 8, 9, 10) organ (5), harp (5), digital editing (7, 10), transcription (2), additional keys (11), sampling (11)
- Catherine Russell – background vocals (4)
- The Inquisitors – background vocals (4, 5, 8)
- Tom Malone – trombone (4)
- Jim Hynes – trumpet (4)
- Peter Eldridge – transcription (5, 11)
- David Schnaufer – dulcimer (7, 10), Tennessee music box (7, 10)
- Declyn Wallace Lauper-Thornton – baby gurgling (8)

Chatterton Elementary School Choir, Merrick, NY
("Early Christmas Morning" and "Silent Night")

- Justine Lane
- Alexandra Thornton
- Jessica Haviland
- Julianna Cohen
- Liza Witmer
- Marti Gruber
- Christopher Safrath
- Brian Zagon
- Stefanie Salino
- Caroline Walker
- Sheahan Brown
- Gregory Meditz
- Erica Leigh Meditz
- Julia Kelsey
- Claudia Greenspan (Choir Mistress)

== Charts ==
Chart (1998)	Peak position
Japanese Albums (Oricon)	75

== Release history ==
Country	Date	Label	Format	Cat No.	Ref.
Japan	21 October 1998	Sony Music Japan	CD	ESCA 7362	
United States	27 October 1998	Sony Music; Epic Records	CD; Cassette	EK 69611; ET 69611	
Austria	2 November 1998	Sony Music; Epic Records	CD	492544 2	
United Kingdom	16 November 1998	Sony Music; Epic Records	CD; Cassette	492544 2; 492544 4	
Australia	23 November 1998	Sony Music; Epic Records	CD		
Brazil	November 1998	Sony Music; Epic Records	CD	758.498/2-492544	
Japan	20 November 2002	Sony Music Japan	CD	EICP-7081	
United States	25 May 2004	Sony Music; Epic Records	CD	92714	
Japan	3 November 2004	Sony Music Japan	CD	MHCP-512	
United States	25 October 2005	Sony BMG	CD	94340	
United States	1 November 2019	Sony Music; Real Gone Music	LP (Green vinyl)	RGM-0930; 19075976061	
United States	1 November 2019	Sony Music; Real Gone Music	LP (Red vinyl)	RGM-0930; 19075986711-S1	
United States	2020	Sony Music; Real Gone Music	LP (White vinyl)	RGM-0930; 19075976061	
United States	5 November 2021	Sony Music; Real Gone Music	LP (Clear vinyl with red and white swirl)	RGM-0930; 19075986711-S2	
