= The Peach Kings =

American rock band

- Origin: Los Angeles, California, U.S.
- Genres: Rock, alternative, indie
- Years active: 2010-present
- Members: Paige Wood; Steven Dies
- Website: www.thepeachkings.com

The Peach Kings are an American rock band that formed in 2010 by Texas-born Paige Wood and Los Angeles native Steven Dies.

== Early life and influences ==
Wood was influenced early on by gospel music in childhood, in addition to listening to Joni Mitchell, Tom Waits, and Aretha Franklin, and singing and playing jazz music on the piano. Wood learned the guitar from listening to blues albums including Jimi Hendrix and Jimmy Page, along with Tom Morello, Neil Young, Tony Iommi, John Frusciante, and Wes Montgomery, and went on to study music at UC Berkeley. She is a former solo artist and Warped Tour alum who performed in New York City before relocating to the West Coast.

The duo met in San Francisco when Wood became roommates with Dies' brother, who suggested that the two of them form a band. Wood and Dies met up, began playing together and quickly formed The Peach Kings. They discovered that Wood's grandmother had taught Dies' mother seventh-grade English in Texas, despite never having met previously. They chose the name The Peach Kings after sharing a peach the first time they met.

The band has a self-described sound of "gypsadelia" and has cited PJ Harvey, Nancy Sinatra, The Cramps, Lou Reed, Lee Hazlewood, and Portishead as musical influences in addition to the vibe of cult film directors David Lynch, Quentin Tarantino, and Paul Thomas Anderson. The band describes it as "everything cool about film noir applied to rock 'n' roll." They also describe themselves as being "all over the place" in terms of drawing their inspiration, including Little Dragon, Led Zeppelin, Roy Orbison, Tom Waits, and Devo, but only getting that "LA Rock" sound from "time-to-time." Both Wood and Dies write the lyrics for the songs in either structured collaboration or bits and pieces at a time, with Dies writing the Spanish lyrics. Wood is also influenced by her love of things that have a "rich history and a story behind them" and describes herself as "a very visual person", with her surroundings and environment helping set the mood while she writes lyrics.

The Peach Kings have been featured by The Huffington Post and Buzzbands.la, described by the former as having a "very gritty, yet sultry vibe that ties it all together."

== Use in media ==
The Peach Kings have had music featured in several movies, TV shows and online media spots including tracks such as "Fisherman" and "Like A Stone" on season 4 of the Showtime series Shameless, and "Thieves & Kings" for the full run of season 4 of HBO's Boardwalk Empire. The band was also filmed by Audi for the digital campaign for Audi Connect.

The band was hand-picked by Drew Barrymore for the V Magazine Playlist in 2012, also featuring Mayer Hawthorne, Mac Miller, M83, Spank Rock, Warpaint, The Drums, Lord Huron, and Audra Mae & The Almighty Sound.

Additionally, The Peach Kings have had tracks featured in FOX's Gotham, MTV's Catfish: The TV Show, NBC's Do No Harm, VH1's Mob Wives, CW Network's Arrow, United States's Necessary Roughness, the Lions Gate film Thanks For Sharing, and the films Deserted, Free Ride, and online for Red Bull Media House.

== Concert tours and residencies ==
=== Headlining tours ===
The Peach Kings completed an eight-week national headlining tour "Night Sweat" in the summer of 2016, beginning in July in Phoenix, Arizona. The band previously set up meet and greets in coffee and tea shops with fans on tour in hopes of making the tour "bigger yet more intimate than just playing shows" and wanting to meet fans.

=== Supporting tours ===
In 2015, while recording the studio album Lover's Leap, The Peach Kings performed live with Reggie Watts at El Cid in Los Angeles.

In 2016, The Peach Kings performed at the SXSW Festival for the second year in a row in March, and toured the US West Coast with The Heavy in April and May.

In May, the band toured across the United States as the opening act for Cyndi Lauper's Detour Tour in May and June, starting at the Ryman Auditorium in Nashville. The Examiner called the "forty-minute set of smoldering rockabilly" "sleazy... but sexy," adding "Paige Wood and Steven Dies wowed... the former mesmerizing onlookers with her smoky voice and pinup figure and the latter with his Link Wray six-string sleight of hand." In Atlanta, The Peach Kings opened with Thieves and Kings and Mojo Thunder before joining Lauper on stage for a "rousing" rendition of "Girls Just Want To Have Fun".

=== Residencies ===
The Peach Kings have had residencies at The Bootleg Theater, Harvard & Stone, and Echoplex.

They performed at the Make Music Festival in 2013, the Sunset Strip Festival and to sold-out audiences at Arlene's Grocery for CMJ in New York City.

== Discography ==
The Peach Kings released their first independent EP Handsome Moves, which included six tracks, on September 6, 2012. The album is available on vinyl. KCRW called Handsome Moves "a perfect calling card, alerting the world that the Peach Kings are a force to be reckoned with and that they are ready to mount their throne."

They released their second independent EP Mojo Thunder on June 3, 2014.

Their debut full-length studio album Lover's Leap is due to be released in 2016.

They have also released several singles, garnered acclaim for their music videos, earned multiple Vimeo Staff Picks and over half a million views on YouTube and Vimeo, in addition to multiple "Today's Top Tune" honors on LA radio stations.

Their track "Easy" was featured on "Playlists by Alexander Wang".

Title	Year	Label
Handsome Moves	2012	Independent
Mojo Thunder	2014	Independent
Lover's Leap	2016	Studio Album

== Awards and nominations ==
In 2010, The Peach Kings won "Unsigned Artist of the Year" in a competition by Paste Magazine and Alternative Apparel.
