= Sisters of Avalon =

Studio album by Cyndi Lauper
- Released: October 16, 1996
- Recorded: April 29 – June 1, 1996
- Studios: English Valley Music; Enchanted Cottage; Pie Studios (New York); Sister's Mobile (Tokyo)
- Genres: Pop rock; alternative rock; electronica; trip hop; new age; dance
- Length: 51:13; 56:20 (Japanese edition)
- Label: Epic
- Producers: Cyndi Lauper; Mark Saunders; Jan Pulsford

Cyndi Lauper chronology
Wanna Have Fun (1996)	Sisters of Avalon (1996)	Merry Christmas ... Have a Nice Life (1998)

Singles from Sisters of Avalon
- 1. "You Don't Know" Released: September 26, 1996; 2. "Sisters of Avalon" Released: January 29, 1997; 3. "Ballad of Cleo and Joe" Released: September 16, 1997

Sisters of Avalon is the fifth studio album by American singer Cyndi Lauper. It was released in Japan on October 16, 1996, and in the United States on April 1, 1997, by Sony Music Entertainment. Thematically the album expounded on the issue of complacency and ignorance in popular culture and the discrimination of minorities, gays, and women. Songs like "Love to Hate" and "You Don't Know" address the entertainment industry and media and their corruption. "Ballad of Cleo and Joe" is a song about the double life of a cross dresser. "Say a Prayer" is about the AIDS epidemic.

The album was heavily praised by multiple music critics due to Lauper's creative growth and eclectic themes. However, the album's release was delayed and sold only 56,000 copies in the United States, according to Nielsen SoundScan. Since its release, the album has been met with continued praise including the Songwriters' Hall of Fame noting the title track as one of Lauper's key songs in her catalog.

== Background and production ==
The title of the album is a reference to the book The Mists of Avalon by Marion Zimmer Bradley, which tells the legend of King Arthur from the point view of the female characters. The record takes a deviation from previous projects, incorporating a blend of electronica production with a variety of traditional instruments such as the guitar, zither, Appalachian dulcimer, and slide dulcimer, as well as an omnichord. There is a permeating pagan theme highlighted by the track "Mother," an ode to Gaea. Speaking to Billboard in 1997, Lauper commented: "To me, this album is a natural progression from the songs on Hat Full of Stars. I've never been more proud of a group of songs." Many of the album's tracks were written by Lauper and Jan Pulsford, who had joined Lauper's band as keyboardist for the tour promoting Hat Full of Stars (1993). Lauper told Billboard: "We were on a special journey that felt so right. Jan and I are extremely compatible collaborators".

The album was released in 1996 in Japan and in 1997 in other parts of the world. The Japanese version features a bonus track, "Early Christmas Morning". The track "Lollygagging" is a hidden track which is nothing more than Lauper and her musicians attempting to record the song "Hot Gets a Little Cold" but making a musical mistake and laughing about it. Cherish Alexander played lead guitar for Cyndi Lauper for the song Sisters of Avalon in the album.

== Critical reception ==
Professional ratings
Review scores
Source	Rating
AllMusic	3/5 stars
Entertainment Weekly	B+
The Guardian	3/5 stars
Music Week	4/5 stars
New York Times	(favourable)
NME	6/10
Pittsburgh Post-Gazette	3/5 stars

Upon release, Larry Flick of Billboard wrote: "The album plays to Lauper's considerable strengths as a vocalist and her marked maturity as a songwriter, with broad stylistic leanings." David Grad of Entertainment Weekly noted: "Lauper remains an intoxicating pop siren. Her sixth album is a wonderfully eclectic affair."

Stephen Thomas Erlewine of AllMusic retrospectively described the album as "varied and eclectic", adding: "While the results aren't always successful, the record is the most intriguing and rewarding album she made since True Colors." People noted the album's variety and "cutting commentary", but felt "for all her bold experimentation, Lauper seems to be trying too hard". Tracy Collins from Pittsburgh Post-Gazette gave the album a favourable review and wrote that the album "is an odd, gutty disc from a woman with a great sense of adventury" and also that it is "the closest thing yet to a credible reinvention for Lauper".

== Commercial performance ==
The album performed poorly in most markets. In the United States, the album debuted at #188 on the chart dated April 19, 1997. It stayed on the chart for one week and has sold 56,000 copies to date. In an interview with Billboard, then-Epic Records VP David Massey acknowledged the challenges the record faced due to Lauper's shift in musical direction and planned for extensive touring to offset lessened support from MTV and radio.

In the UK, the album was released earlier in February 1997 and entered the chart at #59 before leaving the chart the following week. The album entered the Austrian Albums chart at its peak of #45, staying on the chart for 3 weeks. It was her first studio album to chart there since True Colors.

The album was however more successful in Japan where it peaked at #15, spending 9 weeks on the chart and was eventually certified Gold for shipment of 100,000 copies.

== Track listing ==
All songs written by Cyndi Lauper and Jan Pulsford, unless otherwise noted.

No.	Title	Writer(s)	Length
1.	"Sisters of Avalon"		4:20
2.	"Ballad of Cleo and Joe"		4:00
3.	"Fall Into Your Dreams"		4:45
4.	"You Don't Know"		5:14
5.	"Love to Hate"		3:25
6.	"Hot Gets a Little Cold"	Lauper; Catherine Russell	3:37
7.	"Unhook the Stars"		3:56
8.	"Searching"		4:35
9.	"Say a Prayer"		4:53
10.	"Mother"		4:44
11.	"Fearless"	Lauper	3:38
12.	"Brimstone and Fire"		3:35
13.	"Early Christmas Morning" (Japan only)		5:07
14.	"Lollygagging" (instrumental)		0:23

== Personnel ==
- Cyndi Lauper – vocals, backing vocals, guitar, bass recorder, slide dulcimer, omnichord, zither
- Charlie Giordano – accordion
- Mark Saunders – bass guitar, acoustic and electric guitar, keyboards, drum loops and programming
- Jan Pulsford – bass guitar, acoustic piano, drum programming, keyboards, synthesizer, harmonium, loops, samples
- William Wittman – wah-wah guitar, additional lead guitar, rain loop
- Catherine Russell – mandolin, backing vocals
- Shang Shang Typhoon – Japanese banjo, percussion, backing vocals
- Ron Jenkins – bass guitar
- Scooter Warner – drums
- Jimmy Bralower – drum machine
- Larry Campbell – guitar, siturn, violin
- Kat Dyson – guitar, backing vocals
- Larry Etkin, Daniel Levine, Tom Malone – horn section
- Nigel Pulsford – lead guitar
- Geoff Daking, Allen Wentz – technical assistance
- David Schnaufer – Tennessee music box

== Charts ==
Weekly charts

Chart (1997)	Peak position
Austrian Albums (Ö3 Austria)	45
Japanese Albums (Oricon)	15
South African Albums (RISA)	93
UK Albums (Official Charts)	59
US Billboard 200	188

== Certifications ==
Region	Certification	Certified units/sales
Japan (RIAJ)	Gold	100,000^{^}
United States	—	56,000
^{^} Shipments figures based on certification alone.

== Release history ==
Country	Date	Label	Format	Cat. No.	Ref.
Japan	October 16, 1996	Epic	CD	ESCA 6584	
Japan	November 1, 1996	Epic	Minidisc	ESYA 1077	
United Kingdom	February 10, 1997	Epic	CD; Cassette; Minidisc	485370 2; 485370 4; 485370 8	
Canada	March 25, 1997	Epic	CD	EK 66433	
United States	April 1, 1997	Epic	CD	EK 66433	
Australia	May 12, 1997	Epic	CD	4853702	
Chile	May 1997	Epic	CD; Cassette	KLJC 4-485370; KNJC 4-485370	
Japan	3 September 2008	Sony Music	CD	EICP-1043	
