= MTV Video Music Award for Best Overall Performance =

Annual music video award

The MTV Video Music Award for Best Overall Performance in a Video was first given out at the first annual MTV Video Music Awards in 1984. The last of this award was given out in 1987.

== Winners ==
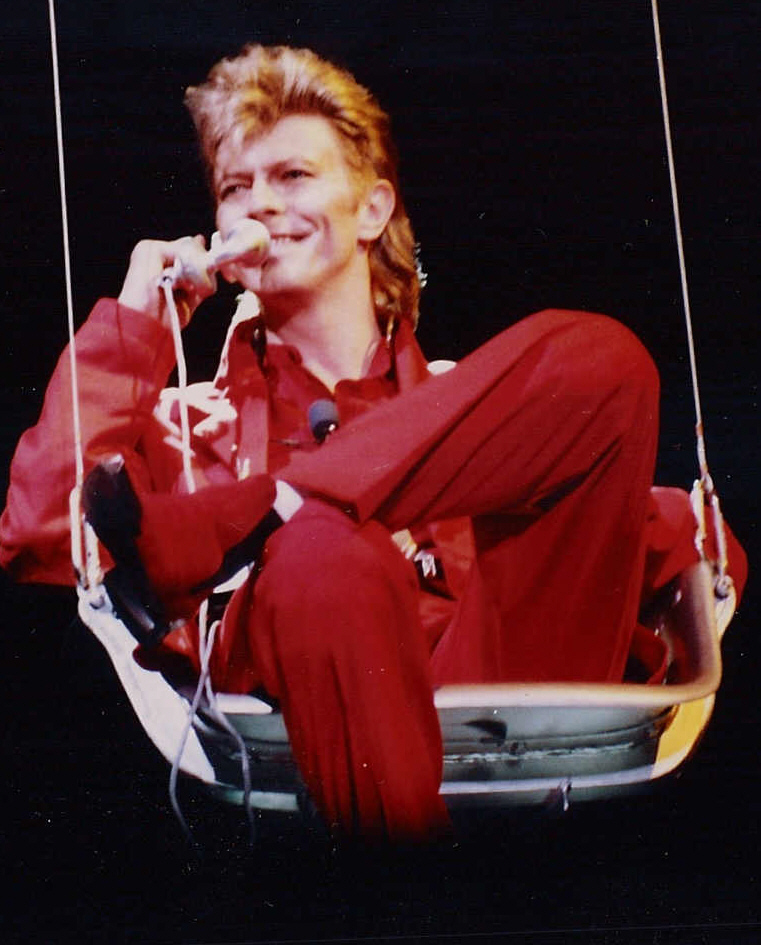
Two-time nominee and 1986 winner David Bowie

Year	Winner(s)	Work	Nominees	Ref.
1984	Michael Jackson	"Thriller"	David Bowie – "China Girl"; Cyndi Lauper – "Girls Just Want to Have Fun"; The Police – "Every Breath You Take"; Van Halen – "Jump"	
1985	Philip Bailey and Phil Collins	"Easy Lover"	Eurythmics – "Would I Lie to You?"; David Lee Roth – "Just a Gigolo/I Ain't Got Nobody"; Bruce Springsteen – "Dancing in the Dark"; USA for Africa – "We Are the World"	
1986	David Bowie and Mick Jagger	"Dancing in the Street"	Dire Straits – "Money for Nothing"; Robert Palmer – "Addicted to Love"; Bruce Springsteen – "Glory Days"; Sting – "If You Love Somebody Set Them Free"	
1987	Peter Gabriel	"Sledgehammer"	Janet Jackson – "Nasty"; Madonna – "Papa Don't Preach"; Run-D.M.C. – "Walk This Way"; U2 – "With or Without You"	
