= Janet Perr =

Janet Perr is an art director, graphic designer, author and illustrator.

She has designed record covers, advertisements, posters, CD packages and book covers and is now the creator of the books Yiddish For Dogs (Hyperion, Sept. 2007) and Yiddish For Babies (Simon & Schuster 2009).

Perr won a Grammy Award for the art direction and design of Cyndi Lauper's debut album She's So Unusual. She has worked with artists such as The Rolling Stones, Run-DMC and Devo. She has also been acknowledged with numerous art directors awards and her work has been featured in the books "Designing For Music" and "1001 Covers".

She attended the Tyler School of Art in Philadelphia and subsequently moved to New York City, where she was a designer at CBS Records and then associate art director at Rolling Stone magazine. She has been an art direction and design freelancer since 1981.
