= Detour (Cyndi Lauper album) =

Studio album by Cyndi Lauper
- Released: May 6, 2016
- Recorded: 2015
- Studio: Sound Emporium (Nashville, Tennessee); Sound Stage (Nashville, Tennessee)
- Genre: Country and western
- Length: 38:18
- Label: Sire; Rhino; Atlantic
- Producer: Cyndi Lauper; Tony Brown

Cyndi Lauper chronology
Kinky Boots (2013)	Detour (2016)	Let the Canary Sing (2024)

Singles from Detour
- 1. "Hard Candy Christmas" Released: December 11, 2015; 2. "Funnel of Love" Released: February 18, 2016

Detour is the twelfth studio album by American recording artist Cyndi Lauper, containing cover versions of country and western songs. It was released on May 6, 2016, and is the artist's first for Sire Records. The album was recorded in Nashville and produced by Tony Brown. In the United States, the album debuted at number 29 on the Billboard 200 and number four on the Billboard Top Country Albums and sold 36,800 copies as of September 2016.

== Production and content ==
Lauper's 2010 album Memphis Blues contained cover versions of blues songs, with blues veterans participating. As a follow-up project, her eleventh album brings together American country music classics from the 1950s and 1960s, and features guest appearances by Vince Gill, Emmylou Harris, Alison Krauss, and Willie Nelson.

The recordings took place in Nashville, with the participation of veteran country music producer Tony Brown and local musicians. Sire Records owner Seymour Stein is the executive producer and instigator of the project. The singer said she chose country music because it is one of the styles she listened to most as a child: "When I was a really young kid, country music was pop music, so this is what we grew up listening to", she also said that: "These songs are part of some of my earliest memories so it has been an absolute thrill to revisit them."

About the experience with the album and the recordings in Nashville, the singer said: "It was exciting to come here and make a record that’s an homage to country", "It's a real singer’s album."

== Critical reception ==
Professional ratings
Aggregate scores
Source	Rating
Metacritic	63/100
Review scores
Source	Rating
Idolator	3.5/5 stars
PopMatters	6/10 stars
Rolling Stone	3/5 stars
AllMusic	3/5 stars

Detour received positive reviews from critics. At Metacritic, which assigns a normalized rating out of 100 to reviews from mainstream critics, Detour has an average score of 63 based on 11 reviews, indicating "generally favorable reviews". Music critic Keith Harris of Rolling Stone magazine wrote "Aging rock and pop stars often seek a late-career safe harbor in country music, but 62-year-old Cyndi Lauper tackles the genre with characteristically daring eccentricity." John Paul of PopMatters wrote "Not entirely successful yet not entirely without merit, Cyndi Lauper’s work on Detour is just that: a detour from the norm and an attempt at finding something new in something old." Stephen Thomas Erlewine from AllMusic website gave the album three out of five stars and wrote that the record is "equally enamored of cowboy camp as it is of Music City craft and corn" and that " [if the album is] taken as a collection of performances and not a coherent record, it's fun". Jonathan Riggs from Idolator website gave the album three out of five stars and wrote that "is a bold and exciting move from a true maverick who, throughout all her experimentations, remains instantly recognizable and ever-lovable" he also wrote that the album is the one "Del Rubio Triplets never recorded, but thankfully for us dimestore cowgirls and cowboys, Cyndi did."

== Commercial performance ==
Detour debuted at number 29 on the US Billboard 200. and in the United Kingdom, at number 43 on the UK Albums (OCC). The album debuted at No. 4 on Billboard's Top Country Albums chart, selling 16,100 copies in its first week. The album has sold 36,800 copies as of September 2016.

== Track listing ==
No.	Title	Writer(s)	Original Artist	Length
1.	"Funnel of Love"	Charlie McCoy; Kent Westbury	Wanda Jackson	3:15
2.	"Detour" (featuring Emmylou Harris)	Paul Westmoreland	Patti Page	2:55
3.	"Misty Blue"	Bob Montgomery	Wilma Burgess	3:19
4.	"Walkin' After Midnight"	Alan Block; Don Hecht	Patsy Cline	2:16
5.	"Heartaches by the Number"	Harlan Howard	Ray Price	3:10
6.	"The End of the World"	Sylvia Dee; Arthur Kent	Skeeter Davis	3:12
7.	"Night Life" (featuring Willie Nelson)	Walt Breeland; Paul Buskirk; Willie Nelson	Willie Nelson	2:58
8.	"Begging to You"	Marty Robbins	Marty Robbins	3:24
9.	"You're the Reason Our Kids Are Ugly" (featuring Vince Gill)	Lola Jean Dillon; L. E. White	Conway Twitty and Loretta Lynn	3:42
10.	"I Fall to Pieces"	Hank Cochran; Howard	Patsy Cline	3:00
11.	"I Want to Be a Cowboy's Sweetheart" (featuring Jewel)	Patsy Montana	Patsy Montana	3:13
12.	"Hard Candy Christmas" (featuring Alison Krauss)	Carol Hall	Dolly Parton	3:54
Total length:				38:18

== Personnel ==
- Cyndi Lauper – lead vocals, producer
- Jewel – duet vocals on "I Want to Be a Cowboy's Sweetheart"
- Alison Krauss – duet vocals on "Hard Candy Christmas"
- Emmylou Harris – duet vocals on "Detour"
- Willie Nelson – acoustic guitar and duet vocals on "Night Life"
- Vince Gill – acoustic and electric guitar and duet vocals on "You're the Reason Our Kids Are Ugly"
- Bryan Sutton – acoustic guitar
- Tom Bukovac – acoustic guitar
- Kenny Greenberg – acoustic and electric guitar
- Dan Dugmore – steel guitar
- Willie Weeks – bass guitar
- Jimmie Lee Sloas – bass guitar
- Aubrey Haynie – fiddle, mandolin
- Steve Nathan – Hammond B-3 organ, piano, synthesizer, Wurlitzer electric piano
- Tony Brown – piano, producer
- Jeff Taylor – accordion
- Chad Cromwell – drums
- Greg Morrow – drums
- Elaine Caswell – background vocals
- Perry Coleman – background vocals
- Neal Coomer – background vocals
- Kim Keyes – background vocals
- Lisa Barbaris – executive producer
- Seymour Stein – executive producer
- Amy Garges – production assistant
- Shawn Pelton – engineer
- Seth Morton – assistant engineer
- Brandon Schexnayder – assistant engineer
- Mike Stankiewicz – assistant engineer
- William Wittman – engineer, mixing
- David Thoener – engineer, mixing
- Ryan Smith – mastering
- Rick Wilkins – arranger
- Ernie Freeman – arranger

== Charts ==
=== Weekly charts ===
Chart (2016–17)	Peak position
Australian Albums (ARIA)	15
Australian Country Albums (ARIA)	2
Belgian Albums (Ultratop Flanders)	63
Belgian Albums (Ultratop Wallonia)	131
Canadian Albums (Billboard)	69
French Albums (SNEP)	142
German Albums (Offizielle Top 100)	64
Italian Albums (FIMI)	76
Japanese Albums (Oricon)	122
New Zealand Heatseekers Albums (RMNZ)	6
Scottish Albums (OCC)	32
Swiss Albums (Schweizer Hitparade)	55
UK Albums (OCC)	43
UK Country Artists Albums (OCC)	1
US Billboard 200	29
US Top Country Albums (Billboard)	4

=== Year-end charts ===
Chart (2016)	Position
Australian Country Albums (ARIA)	52
US Top Country Albums (Billboard)	59
