= Kinky Boots (Broadway cast album) =

Cast recording by various artists
- Released: May 28, 2013
- Length: 55:02
- Label: Masterworks Broadway
- Producer: Cyndi Lauper

Cyndi Lauper chronology
Memphis Blues (2010)	Kinky Boots (2013)	Detour (2016)

Kinky Boots is a Broadway original cast album for the eponymous musical, Kinky Boots. It was released on May 28, 2013, less than two months after the show opened on Broadway. It was produced by Cyndi Lauper, who wrote the songs, Stephen Oremus, the orchestrator and conductor, and William Wittman. On release it premiered at number one on the Billboard Cast Albums Chart and number fifty-one on the Billboard 200 chart, making it the highest charting Broadway cast recording since The Book of Mormon's album was released two years earlier. Vocalists on the album include Stark Sands, Billy Porter and Annaleigh Ashford.

Before the album's release and the show's Chicago tryout beginning in October 2012, the song "Sex Is in the Heel" became the first Broadway song to reach the top 10 of the Billboard club charts in 25 years. "Land of Lola" was released as a dance remix by Wayne G. & LFB in June 2013.

== Reception ==
The album received a favorable review in Playbill from Steven Suskin and won the Grammy Award for Best Musical Theater Album.

== Track listing ==
Kinky Boots track listing
No.	Title	Length
1.	"Price and Son Theme / The Most Beautiful Thing in the World"	6:20
2.	"Take What You Got"	3:18
3.	"Land of Lola"	3:07
4.	"Charlie's Soliloquy"	1:17
5.	"Step One"	2:48
6.	"Sex Is in the Heel"	4:34
7.	"The History of Wrong Guys"	3:48
8.	"Not My Father's Son"	5:57
9.	"Everybody Say Yeah"	4:19
10.	"What a Woman Wants"	3:54
11.	"In This Corner"	4:56
12.	"Charlie's Soliloquy Reprise"	0:49
13.	"Soul of a Man"	3:22
14.	"Hold Me in Your Heart"	3:04
15.	"Raise You Up / Just Be"	6:09
