= Cyndi Lauper =

American singer-songwriter and actress (born 1953)

- Lauper in 2024
- Born: Cynthia Ann Stephanie Lauper; June 22, 1953 (age 73); New York City, U.S.
- Occupations: Singer; songwriter; producer; actress; activist
- Years active: 1978–present
- Spouse: David Thornton (m. 1991)
- Children: 1
- Musical career
- Origin: Queens, New York City, U.S.
- Genres: Pop; new wave
- Instruments: Vocals; dulcimer; guitar
- Labels: Portrait; Epic; Daylight; Downtown; Sire
- Formerly of: Blue Angel
- Website: cyndilauper.com

Cynthia Ann Stephanie Lauper (/ˈlɔːpər/ LAW-pər; born June 22, 1953) is an American singer, songwriter and actress. Lauper is known for her distinctive image, which features eccentric clothing and a variety of hair colors. She is also known for her powerful four-octave vocal range. Lauper has been dubbed the "Queen of Quirky Pop". She has sold over 50 million records worldwide. She has also been celebrated for her humanitarian work, particularly as an advocate for LGBTQ rights in the United States.

Lauper's debut album, She's So Unusual (1983), was the first debut album by a female artist to achieve four top-five hits on the Billboard Hot 100—"Girls Just Want to Have Fun", "Time After Time", "She Bop", and "All Through the Night"—and earned Best New Artist at the 27th Annual Grammy Awards in 1985. The music video for "Girls Just Want to Have Fun" won Best Female Video at the inaugural 1984 MTV Video Music Awards and has been hailed by MTV, VH1 and Rolling Stone as one of the greatest videos of the era. Lauper's second album, True Colors (1986), achieved two more top-five hits; the title track and "Change of Heart". Lauper's chart success continued with the singles "The Goonies 'R' Good Enough" (1985), "I Drove All Night" (1989) and into the 2000s with multiple number-one hits on the Hot Dance Club Play charts, "Same Ol' Story", and "Into the Nightlife" (2008).

Since 1983, Lauper has released twelve studio albums and participated in many other projects. In 2010, Memphis Blues became Billboard's most successful blues album of the year, remaining at number one on the Billboard Blues Albums chart for 13 consecutive weeks. In 2013, Lauper won the Tony Award for Best Original Score for composing the Broadway musical Kinky Boots, making her the first woman to win the category by herself. The musical was awarded five other Tonys, including Best Musical. In 2014, Lauper was awarded the Grammy Award for Best Musical Theater Album for the cast recording. In 2016, the West End production won the Laurence Olivier Award for Best New Musical.

Lauper's accolades include two Grammy Awards, a Primetime Emmy Award, a Tony Award, three MTV Video Music Awards, four Billboard Music Awards, two American Music Awards and a star on the Hollywood Walk of Fame. In 2015, she was inducted into the Songwriters Hall of Fame. Lauper was inducted into the Rock and Roll Hall of Fame in November 2025. She's So Unusual ranked 494th among Rolling Stone's 2003 list of the 500 Greatest Albums of All Time. VH1 named "Time After Time" one of the best songs of the preceding 25 years, and named Lauper the 58th-greatest woman in rock and roll.

== Early life and family ==
Lauper was born in Brooklyn, New York City, to a Catholic family. Her father, Fred, was of Swiss-German descent, and a descendant of Christen Lauper, a leader of the Swiss peasant war of 1653. Her mother, Catrine (née Gallo; 1930–2022), was of Italian (Sicilian) descent. Lauper has a younger brother and an older sister. Her parents divorced when she was five years old. Her mother later remarried and divorced again.

Lauper grew up in the Ozone Park neighborhood of Queens and, as a child, listened to such artists as the Beatles and Judy Garland. At age 12, she began writing songs and playing an acoustic guitar given to her by her sister.

Lauper expressed herself with a variety of hair colors and eccentric clothing, and took a friend's advice to spell her name as "Cyndi" rather than "Cindy". Her unconventional sense of style led to classmates bullying and throwing stones at her.

Lauper went to Richmond Hill High School, but was expelled. She later earned her General Educational Development (GED) certification. She ran away from home at 17 to escape her abusive stepfather, intending to study art. Lauper has stated that the final factor which influenced her to run away from home was the discovery that her stepfather peeped through the bathroom keyhole at her as she bathed. Her journey took her to Canada, where she spent two weeks in the woods with her dog Sparkle trying to find herself. She eventually traveled to Vermont, where she took art classes at Johnson State College and supported herself working odd jobs.

== Career ==
=== 1980–1982: Blue Angel ===
In 1978, Lauper met saxophonist John Turi through her manager Ted Rosenblatt. Turi and Lauper formed a band named Blue Angel and recorded a demo tape of original music. Steve Massarsky, manager of the Allman Brothers Band, heard the tape and liked Lauper's voice. He bought Blue Angel's contract for $5,000 and became their manager.

Lauper received recording offers as a solo artist, but held out, wanting the band to be included in any deal she made. Blue Angel was eventually signed by Polydor Records and they released their debut and sole studio album Blue Angel on the label in 1980. Lauper hated the album cover, saying that it made her look like Big Bird, but Rolling Stone magazine later included it as one of the 100 best new wave album covers (2003). Despite critical acclaim, the album sold poorly ("It went lead," as Lauper later joked) and the band broke up. The members of Blue Angel had a falling-out with Massarsky and fired him as their manager. He later filed an $80,000 suit against them, which forced Lauper into bankruptcy. After this Lauper temporarily lost her voice due to an inverted cyst in her vocal cord.

After Blue Angel broke up, Lauper spent time, due to her financial problems, working in retail stores, waitressing at IHOP (which she quit after being demoted to hostess when the manager sexually harassed her), and singing in local clubs. Her most frequent gigs were at El Sombrero. Music critics who saw Lauper perform with Blue Angel believed she had star potential due to her four-octave singing range. She would later also have a prominent stay at the Malibu Shore Club in Lido Beach, Long Island, with Lauper also later stating that she was during this time raped by one of the band's male guitarists in the 1980s. In 1981, while singing in a local New York bar, Lauper met David Wolff, who took over as her manager and had her sign a recording contract with Portrait Records, a subsidiary of Epic Records.

=== 1983–1985: She's So Unusual ===
On October 14, 1983, Lauper released her debut solo studio album, She's So Unusual. The album became a worldwide hit, peaking at No. 4 in the U.S. and reaching the top five in eight other countries. The primary studio musicians were Eric Bazilian and Rob Hyman (of the Hooters), Rick Chertoff, Richard Termini and Peter Wood. Lauper became popular with teenagers and critics alike, in part due to her hybrid punk image, which was crafted by stylist Patrick Lucas.

Lauper co-wrote four songs on She's So Unusual, including the hits "Time After Time" and "She Bop". On the songs she did not write, Lauper sometimes changed the lyrics; for instance, Lauper found the original lyrics to "Girls Just Want to Have Fun" to be misogynistic, so she rewrote the song as an anthem for young women.

The album includes five cover songs, including the Brains' new wave track "Money Changes Everything" (number 27 on the Billboard Hot 100) and Prince's "When You Were Mine". The album made Lauper the first female artist to have four consecutive Billboard Hot 100 top five hits from one album. The album stayed in the Top 200 charts for more than 65 weeks, and since has sold 16 million copies worldwide.

Lauper won Best New Artist at the 27th Annual Grammy Awards (1985). She's So Unusual also received nominations for Album of the Year, Record of the Year, Best Female Pop Vocal Performance (for "Girls Just Want to Have Fun"), and Song of the Year (for "Time After Time"). She wore almost a pound of necklaces at her award ceremony. It also won the Grammy for Best Album Package, which went to the art director, Janet Perr.

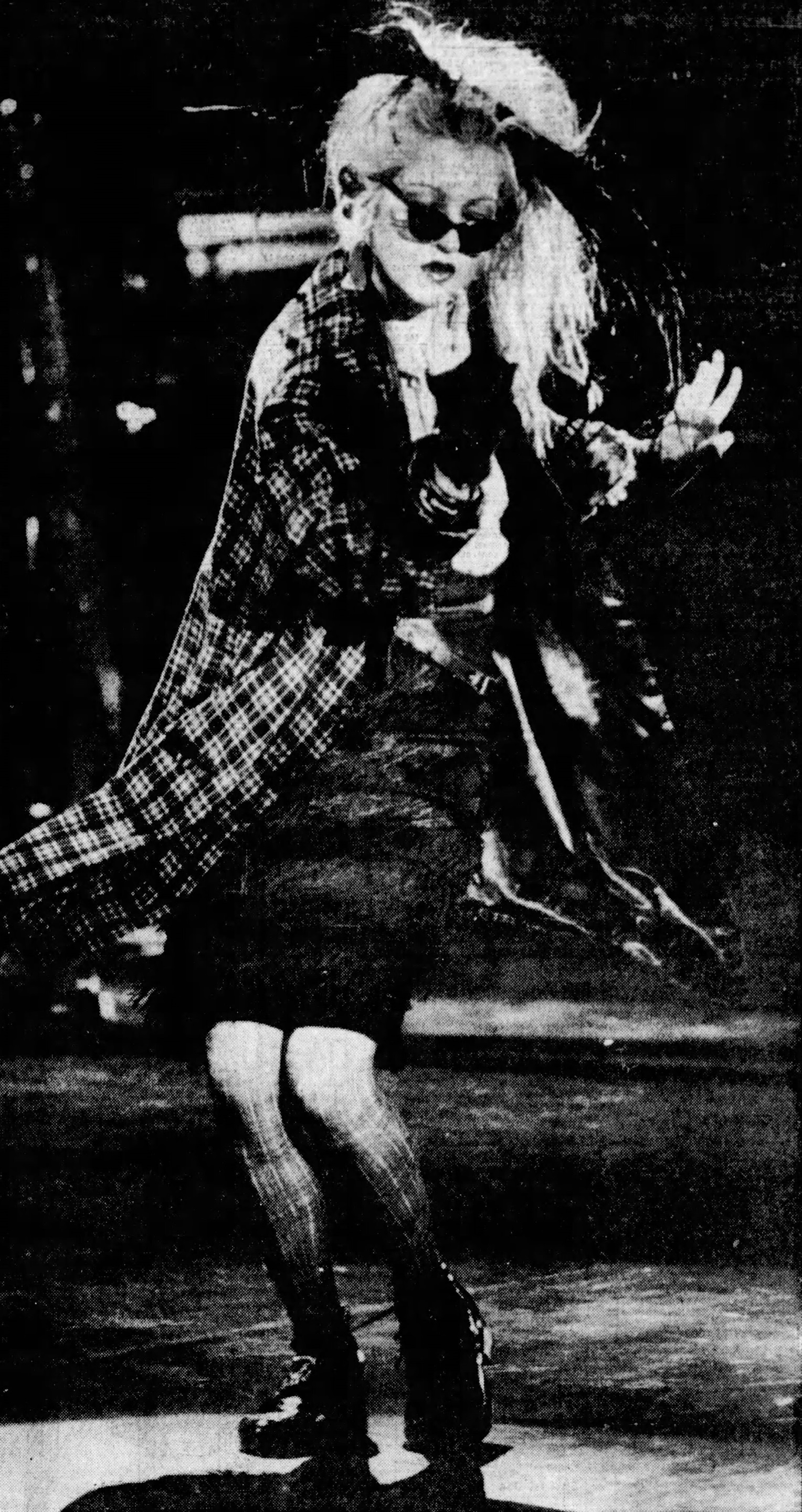
Lauper in 1984

The music video for "Girls Just Want to Have Fun" won the inaugural award for Best Female Video at the 1984 MTV Video Music Awards, and made Lauper an MTV staple. The video featured professional wrestling manager "Captain" Lou Albano as Lauper's father, and her real-life mother, Catrine, as her mother, and also featured her attorney, her manager, her brother Butch, and her dog Sparkle. In 1984–85, Lauper appeared on the covers of the magazines Rolling Stone, Time, and Newsweek. She appeared twice on the cover of People, and was named a Ms. magazine Woman of the Year in 1985.

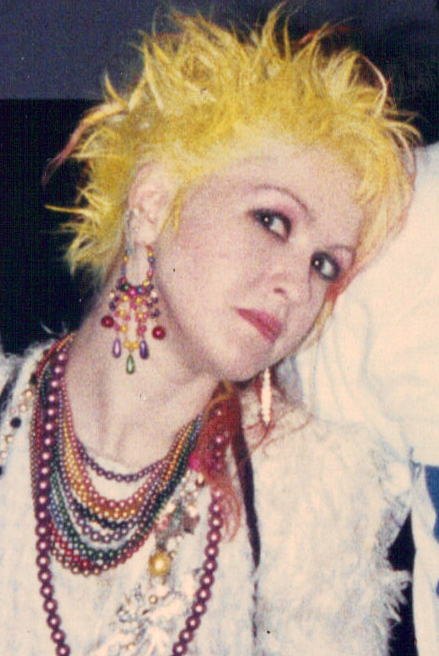
Lauper in 1985

In 1985, Lauper participated in USA for Africa's famine-relief fund-raising single "We Are the World," which sold more than 20 million copies since then. Lauper appeared with professional wrestler Hulk Hogan, who was cast as her "bodyguard", and would also later make many appearances as herself in a number of the World Wrestling Federation's "Rock 'n' Wrestling Connection" events, and after making her debut in the World Wrestling Federation in June 1984, became Wendi Richter's manager. Half a year after "Captain" Lou Albano appeared in the "Girls Just Want to Have Fun" music video, an angle developed where Lauper feuded with the sexist Albano, and managed Richter when she defeated Albano's choice The Fabulous Moolah for the WWF Women's Championship at The Brawl to End It All, which was broadcast live on MTV on July 23, 1984. By the end of 1984, the storyline feud between Lauper and Albano was dropped when Albano turned face, with Albano even becoming more friendly towards Lauper.

In spite of this, Lauper still continued to make some appearances at WWF shows as Richter's manager during Richter's 1984-1985 WWF run, including at the inaugural WrestleMania event. David Wolff, Lauper's boyfriend and manager at the time, was a wrestling fan as a boy, and engineered the rock and wrestling connection. Salt Lake City radio station 92.5 The Beat has described Lauper, who was instrumental in the WWF's early ties to MTV, as having helped put the WWF "on the Map" and for having "a key role in launching WWF into the mainstream".

In May 1985, Lauper released the single "The Goonies 'R' Good Enough", from the soundtrack to the film The Goonies, and an accompanying music video which featured several wrestling stars, Steven Spielberg, the majority of The Goonies cast, and the then relatively unknown Bangles. The song peaked at number 10 on the Billboard Hot 100 chart.

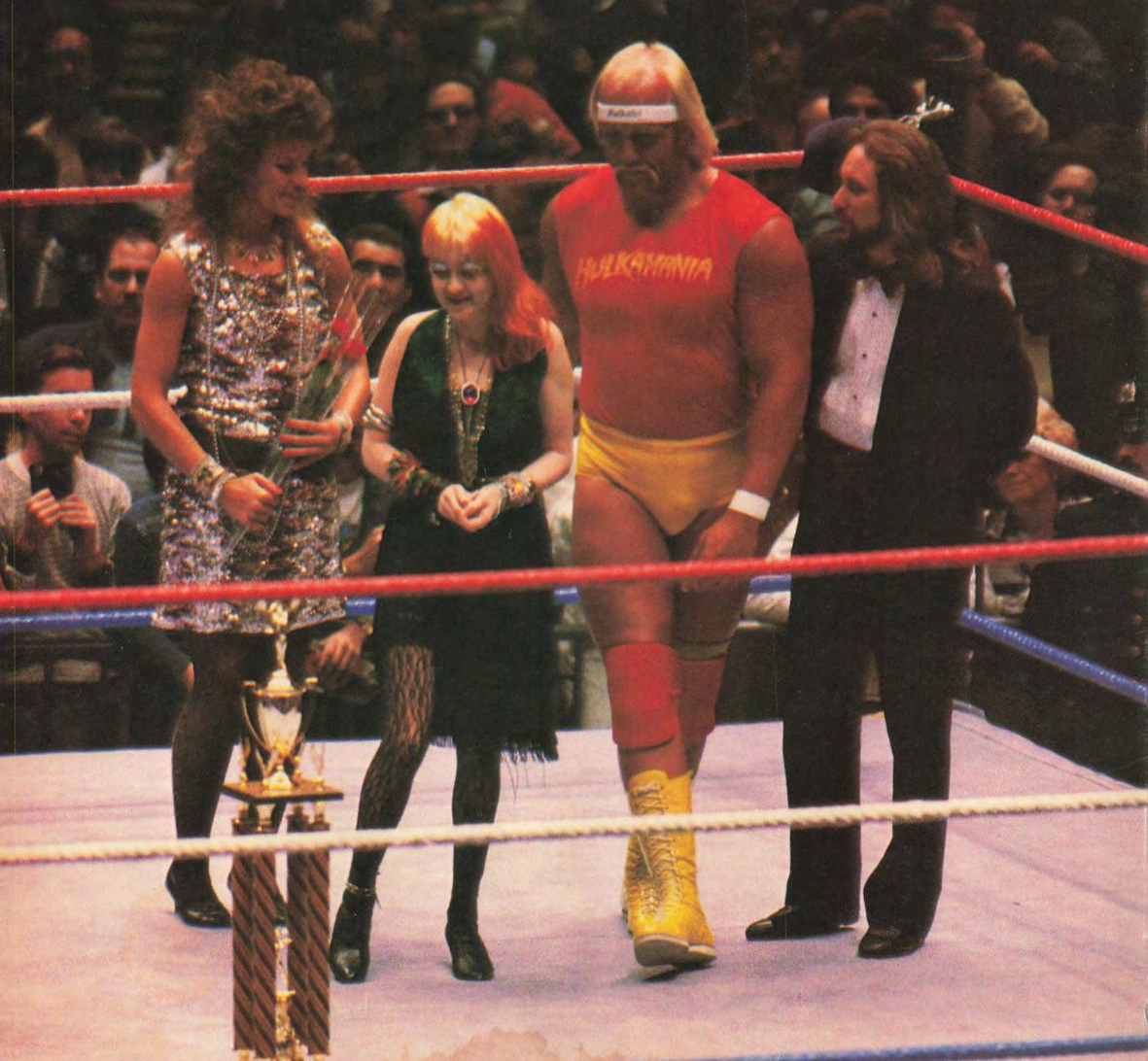
Left to right: Wendi Richter, Lauper, Hulk Hogan and David Wolff in 1985

Wendi Richter and Lauper stopped appearing as frequently in WWF when the former lost the Women's Championship in a controversial match against The Fabulous Moolah in November 1985, which came to be known as "the original screwjob".

=== 1986–1988: True Colors and Vibes ===
Lauper received a nomination at the 1986 Grammy Awards: Best Female Rock Vocal Performance for "What a Thrill", another in the same category the following year (for the album track "911") and yet another in 1988, Best Long Form Music Video for Cyndi Lauper in Paris.

Lauper released her second studio album, True Colors in 1986. It entered the Billboard 200 at No. 42 and rose to its number 4 peak.

In 1986, Lauper appeared on Billy Joel's tenth studio album The Bridge, with a song called "Code of Silence". She is credited as having written the lyrics with Joel and she sings harmony vocals with him. In the same year, Lauper also sang the theme song for the children's television series Pee-wee's Playhouse, credited as "Ellen Shaw". In 1987, David Wolff produced a concert film for Lauper called Cyndi Lauper in Paris. The concert was broadcast on HBO.

Lauper made her film debut in August 1988 in the quirky comedy Vibes, alongside Jeff Goldblum, Peter Falk, and Julian Sands. Lauper played a psychic in search of a city of gold in South America. Deborah Blum and Tony Ganz produced the film, with David Wolff as associate producer. To prepare for the role, Lauper took a few classes in finger waving and hair setting at the Robert Fiancé School of Beauty in New York, and studied with a few Manhattan psychics. The film flopped and was poorly received by critics.

Lauper contributed a track called "Hole in My Heart (All the Way to China)" for the Vibes soundtrack, but the song was not included. A music video was released, a high-energy, comic action/adventure romp through a Chinese laundry. The song reached No. 54 on the US charts, but fared better in Australia, reaching No. 8.

=== 1989–1992: A Night to Remember and marriage ===
A Night to Remember – Lauper's third studio album – was released on May 9, 1989. The album had one U.S. hit, the No. 6 single "I Drove All Night", originally recorded by Roy Orbison in 1987, though Lauper's version came out first, and Orbison's version was not released until 1991. Lauper received a Grammy nomination for Best Female Rock Vocal Performance at the 1990 Grammy Awards for "I Drove All Night", but overall album sales for A Night to Remember were down. The music video for the album's song "My First Night Without You" was one of the first to be closed-captioned for the hearing impaired.

Due to a friendship with Yoko Ono, Lauper took part in the May 1990 John Lennon tribute concert in Liverpool, performing the Beatles song "Hey Bulldog" and the John Lennon song "Working Class Hero". She also took part in Ono and Lennon's son Sean's project called the Peace Choir, performing a new version of Lennon's "Give Peace a Chance".

=== 1993–1995: Hat Full of Stars and Twelve Deadly Cyns ===
Lauper's fourth studio album Hat Full of Stars was released on May 21, 1993, and was met with critical acclaim, but failed commercially, unsupported by her label. The album, which tackled such topics as homophobia, domestic violence, racism, and abortion sold fewer than 120,000 copies in the United States and peaked at No. 112 on the Billboard charts. The music video for the album's song "Sally's Pigeons" features the then-unknown Julia Stiles as the young Cyndi.

In 1993, Lauper returned to acting, playing Michael J. Fox's ditzy secretary in the poorly-received comedy film Life with Mikey. However, she won an Emmy Award for her guest role as Marianne Lugasso in the television sitcom Mad About You.

=== 1996–2000: Sisters of Avalon and Merry Christmas ... Have a Nice Life ===
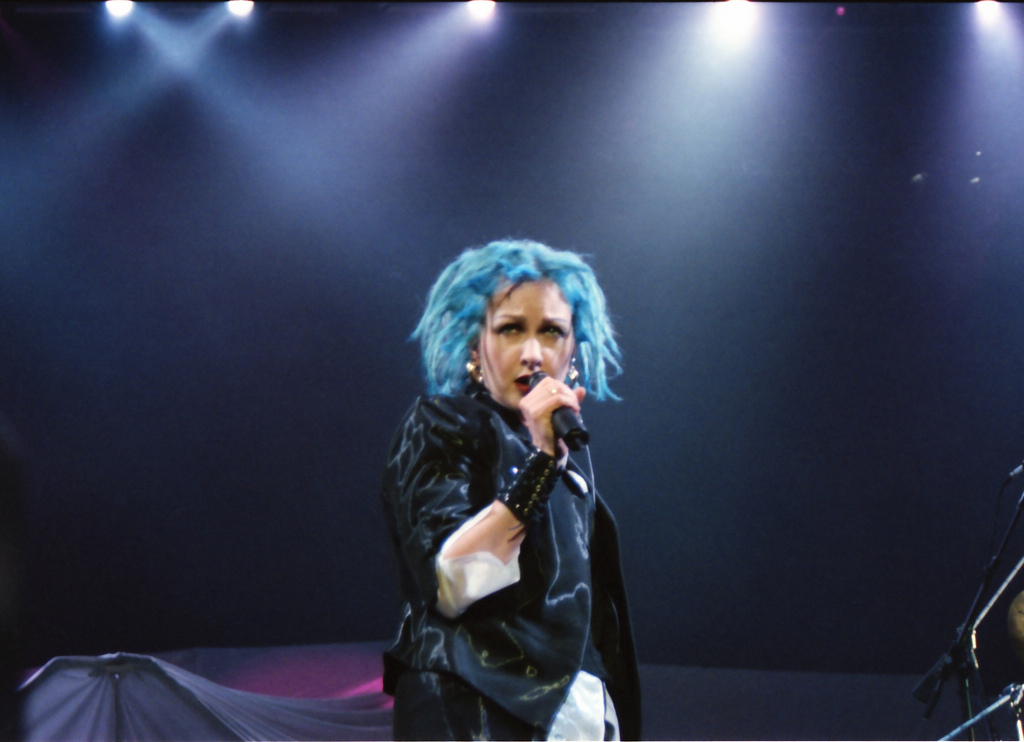
Lauper performing in 2000

Lauper's fifth studio album, Sisters of Avalon, was released in Japan in October 1996, and elsewhere in April 1997. The album was written and produced with the help of Jan Pulsford (Lauper's keyboardist) and producer Mark Saunders. As in Hat Full of Stars, some of the songs in Sisters of Avalon addressed dark themes. The song "Ballad of Cleo and Joe" addressed the complications of a drag queen's double life. The song "Say a Prayer" was written for a friend of hers who had died from AIDS. "Unhook the Stars" was used in the drama film Unhook the Stars (1996). Again without support from her label, the release failed in America, spending a single week on the Billboard album chart at No. 188. This album also met with much critical praise, including People magazine, which declared it "'90s nourishment for body and soul. Lauper sets a scene, makes us care, gives us hope."

On October 27, 1998, she released her sixth studio album and first Christmas album, Merry Christmas ... Have a Nice Life. It combines original compositions by Lauper and collaborator Jan Pulsford with traditional Christmas songs. "Feels Like Christmas" previously appeared on Lauper's studio album Hat Full of Stars (1993).

On January 17, 1999, Lauper appeared as an animated version of herself in The Simpsons episode "Wild Barts Can't Be Broken", singing "The Star-Spangled Banner" to the melody of "Girls Just Want to Have Fun". That same year, Lauper opened for Cher's Do You Believe? Tour alongside the girl group Wild Orchid. She also appeared in the films Mrs. Parker and the Vicious Circle (1994) and The Opportunists (1999). She contributed to the soundtrack of the animated comedy film, Rugrats in Paris: The Movie (2000), performing the song "I Want a Mom That Will Last Forever".

=== 2001–2004: Shine and At Last ===
On October 12, 2000, Lauper took part in the television show Women in Rock, Girls with Guitars performing with Ann Wilson of Heart and with the girl group, Destiny's Child. A CD of the songs performed was released exclusively to Sears stores from September 30 to October 31, 2001, and was marketed as a fundraiser for breast cancer.

In April 2002, Sony issued a compilation album, The Essential Cyndi Lauper. Lauper also released a cover album with Sony/Epic Records entitled At Last (formerly Naked City), which was released in November 2003. At Last received one nomination at the 2005 Grammy Awards: Best Instrumental Arrangement Accompanying Vocalist(s), for "Unchained Melody". The effort was also a commercial hit, selling 4.5 million records.

In April 2004, Lauper performed during the VH1's benefit concert Divas 2004 alongside Ashanti, Gladys Knight, Jessica Simpson, Joss Stone and Patti LaBelle, in support of the Save the Music Foundation.

=== 2005–2007: The Body Acoustic ===
She released her ninth studio album The Body Acoustic and made appearances on Showtime's hit show Queer as Folk in 2005, directed a commercial for Totally 80s edition of the board game Trivial Pursuit in 2006, served as a judge on the 6th Annual Independent Music Awards and made her Broadway debut in the Tony-nominated The Threepenny Opera as Jenny. She performed with Shaggy, Scott Weiland of Velvet Revolver and Stone Temple Pilots, Pat Monahan of Train, Ani DiFranco, and the Hooters in the VH1 Classic special Decades Rock Live!. In 2006, she sang "Message to Michael" with Dionne Warwick and "Beecharmer" with Nellie McKay on McKay's second studio album, Pretty Little Head.

On October 16, 2006, Lauper was inducted into The Long Island Music and Entertainment Hall of Fame. In 2007, she served as a guest performer on the song "Lady in Pink" on an episode of the Nick Jr. show The Backyardigans.

=== 2008–2009: Bring Ya to the Brink ===
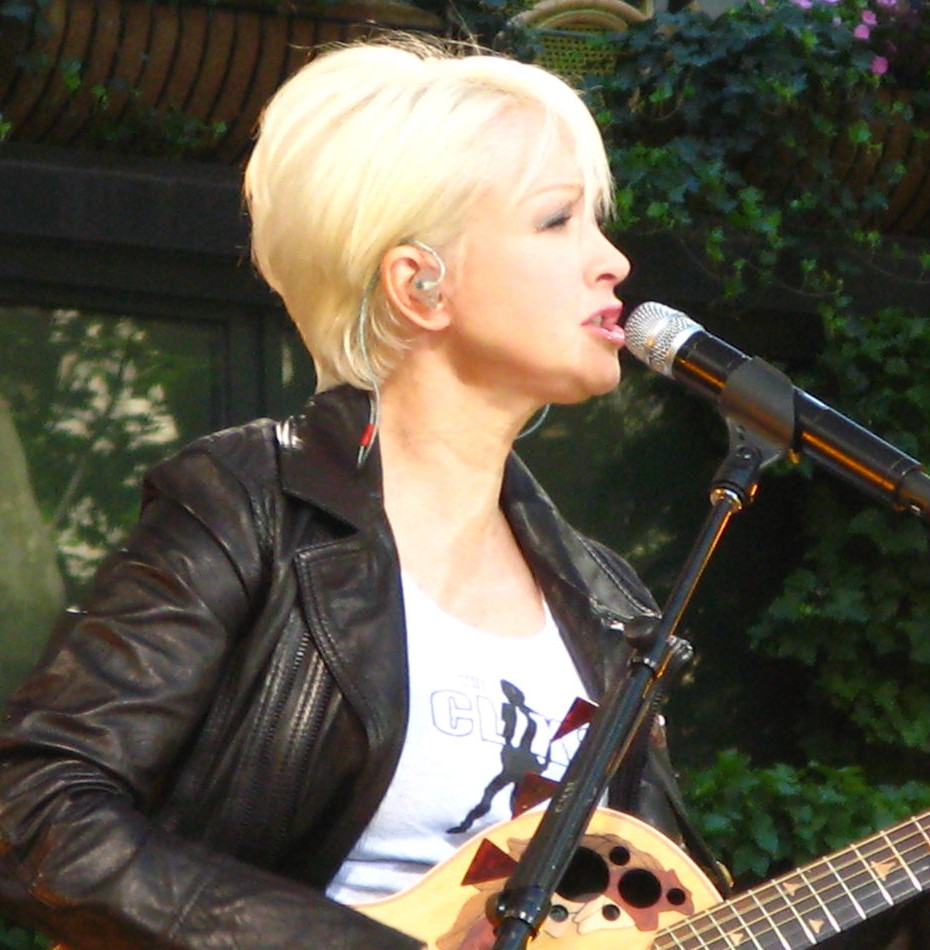
Lauper in 2008

Lauper's tenth studio album, Bring Ya to the Brink, was released in the United States on May 27, 2008. Other projects for 2008 included the True Colors Tour and a Christmas duet with Swedish rock band the Hives, entitled "A Christmas Duel". The song was released as a CD single and a 7" vinyl in Sweden. Lauper also performed on the "Girls Night Out", headlining it with Rosie O'Donnell in the US.

In 2009, Lauper guest starred on her first of five episodes of Bones on Fox, as psychic Avalon Harmonia.

On November 17, 2009, Lauper performed a collaborative work with Haitian rapper Wyclef Jean called "Slumdog Millionaire", performing it on the Late Show with David Letterman.

=== 2010–2012: The Celebrity Apprentice, Memphis Blues and memoir ===
In January 2010, Mattel released a Cyndi Lauper Barbie doll as part of their "Ladies of the 80s" series.

In March 2010, Lauper appeared on NBC's The Celebrity Apprentice, coming in sixth place.

Memphis Blues—Lauper's eleventh studio album—was released on June 22, 2010, and debuted on the Billboard Blues Albums chart at number one, and at number 26 on the Billboard Top 200. The album remained number one on the Blues Albums chart for 14 consecutive weeks; Memphis Blues was nominated for Best Traditional Blues Album at the 2011 Grammy Awards.

Lauper made international news in March 2011 for an impromptu performance of "Girls Just Want to Have Fun" while waiting for a delayed flight at Aeroparque Jorge Newbery in Buenos Aires, Argentina. A video was later posted on YouTube.

In November 2011, she released two Christmas singles exclusive to iTunes. The first release was a Blues-inspired cover of Elvis Presley's classic "Blue Christmas", and the second was a new version of "Home for the Holidays", a duet with Norah Jones. In June 2012, Lauper made her first appearance for WWE in 27 years, to promote WWE Raw's 1,000th episode to memorialize "Captain" Lou Albano.

In September 2012, Lauper performed at fashion designer Betsey Johnson's 40 year Retrospective Fashion show. That month Lauper also published her memoir Cyndi Lauper: A Memoir, in which she detailed her struggle with childhood abuse and depression.

=== 2013–2015: Kinky Boots and touring ===
Lauper composed music and lyrics for the Broadway musical Kinky Boots, with Harvey Fierstein writing the book. The musical was based on the British comedy-drama film Kinky Boots (2005). It opened in Chicago in October 2012 and on Broadway at the Al Hirschfeld Theatre on April 4, 2013. In May, she won Best Score for Kinky Boots at the 63rd annual Outer Critics Circle Awards. The musical led the 2013 Tony Awards, with 13 nominations and six wins including Best Musical and Best Actor. She won the award for Best Original Score. Lauper was the first woman to win solo in this category. After a six-year run and 2,507 regular shows, Kinky Boots ended its Broadway run on April 7, 2019. It is the 25th-longest-running Broadway musical in history. It grossed $297 million on Broadway.

In the summer of 2013, in celebration of the 30th anniversary of her debut studio album She's So Unusual, Lauper embarked on an international tour covering America and Australia. The show consisted of a mix of fan favorites and the entirety of the She's So Unusual album. She was a guest on 36 dates of Cher's Dressed to Kill Tour, starting April 23, 2014. A new studio album was confirmed by Lauper on a website interview.

Lauper hosted the Grammy Pre-Telecast at the Nokia Theatre in Los Angeles on Jan 26, where she later accepted a Grammy for Kinky Boots (Best Musical Theater Album).

On April 1 (March 1 in Europe), Lauper released the 30th Anniversary edition of She's So Unusual through Epic Records It featured a remastered version of the original album plus three new remixes. The Deluxe Edition featured bonus tracks such as demos and a live recording as well as a 3D cut-out of the bedroom featured in the "Girls Just Want to Have Fun" music video with a reusable sticker set.

On September 17, 2014, Lauper sang on the finale of America's Got Talent. On September 25, as part of The Today Show's Shine a Light series, Lauper re-recorded "True Colors" in a mashup with Sara Bareilles' "Brave" to raise awareness and money for children battling cancer. By October the project had raised over $300,000.

The Songwriters Hall of Fame included Lauper in its nomination list in October 2014. Also during October, Lauper's fourth consecutive 'Home for the Holidays' benefit concert for homeless gay youth was announced. Acts included 50 Cent and Laverne Cox with 100% of the net proceeds going to True Colors United.

In March 2015, Lauper once again guest starred on the crime show Bones as Avalon Harmonia.

Lauper promoted her work with Novartis and the National Psoriasis Foundation, and discussed her own five years with psoriasis, on The Today Show in July 2015. She also announced a project with producer Seymour Stein, which she later told Rolling Stone was a country album coproduced by Tony Brown.

On September 15, 2015, Kinky Boots opened at the Adelphi Theatre in London's West End.

On August 30, 2017, songwriters Benny Mardones and Robert Tepper sued Lauper for lifting elements from their 1980 song "Into the Night" for Kinky Boots' final song "Raise You Up". In August 2019, a filed letter by Mardones' lawyer stated that all parties involved have agreed in principle to settle the case. No more details were given at the time.

=== 2016–2019: Detour ===
In January 2016, Lauper announced she would release a new studio album on May 6, 2016. This was composed of her interpretations of early country classics entitled Detour. The announcement was supported by a release of her version of Harlan Howard's "Heartaches by the Number" and a performance on Skyville Live with Kelsea Ballerini and Ingrid Michaelson. On February 17, 2016, she released her version of Wanda Jackson's "Funnel of Love".

In February 2016, Lauper was nominated for an Laurence Olivier Award for her contribution to the UK production of Kinky Boots along with Stephen Oremus, the man responsible for the arrangements. In January 2017, this production's album was nominated for the Grammy Award for Best Musical Theater Album.

In May 2016, Lauper was featured on the song "Swipe to the Right" from Electronica 2: The Heart of Noise by French composer, performer and record producer Jean-Michel Jarre. It is the second of a two-part album (the first being Electronica 1: The Time Machine) that is based around collaborations with other electronic musicians from a wide range of decades and styles.

In October 2016, her son Declyn Lauper was the opening act for her Scottsdale, Arizona and Las Vegas, Nevada dates on her Detour Tour.

In January 2017, Lauper was featured on Austin City Limits' 42nd season performing some of her classic songs alongside country tunes from Detour. The episode aired on PBS.

In 2017, Lauper, together with "Time After Time" songwriter Rob Hyman, contributed the track "Hero Is My Middle Name" for the musical SpongeBob SquarePants.

In March 2018, it was announced that Lauper and Hyman were also going to compose the score for the musical version of the romantic comedy drama film Working Girl (1988) which starred Harrison Ford, Sigourney Weaver, Joan Cusack, and Melanie Griffith. She teamed up with Hyman because she wanted "the music to sound like the 80s". The musical was staged by Tony Award winner Christopher Ashley. A developmental production premiere of the musical is planned for the 2021/2022 season. The musical debuted at the La Jolla playhouse on October 28, 2025. It closed December 14, 2025. Lauper guest-starred playing a lawyer in an episode of the reboot of the action drama television series Magnum P.I.. The episode, titled "Sudden Death", aired on October 22, 2018.

On November 15, 2018, it was announced that Lauper would receive the Icon Award at the Billboard's 13th annual Women in Music Event on December 6 in New York City. According to Jason Lipshutz, Billboard's editorial director, "The entire world recognizes the power of Cyndi Lauper's pop music, and just as crucially, she has used her undeniable talent to soar beyond music, create positive change in modern society and become a true icon".

The song "Together" was featured in the Canadian animated film Racetime released in January 2019. Originally written and performed in French by Canadian singer and musician Dumas, Lauper performed the English translation in the English version of the film originally titled La Course des tuques.

On June 26, 2019, Lauper performed at the opening ceremony of Stonewall 50 – WorldPride NYC 2019. Backed by the Hollywood Bowl Orchestra, conducted by Thomas Wilkins, Lauper played two concerts on July 12 and 13, 2019 at the Hollywood Bowl.

On September 6, 2019, the 2-disc compilation album, Japanese Singles Collection – Greatest Hits was released, nine days after its original Japanese release. It includes all of Lauper's singles released in Japan from 1983 to 1995 in chronological order. The second disc contains 26 music videos. Nine of these were available for the first time on DVD.

In September 2019, it was announced that Lauper would star alongside Jane Lynch in the new Netflix comedy series described as "kind of The Golden Girls for today". As of March 2025, there had not been any updates on this project.

=== 2020–2023: Let The Canary Sing announcement, song releases… ===
On January 26, 2020, Lauper sang a chorus from the song "I Sing the Body Electric" of the soundtrack from the teen musical drama film Fame (1980) at the 62nd Annual Grammy Awards ceremony held in Los Angeles. Other performers were Ben Platt, Camila Cabello, Debbie Allen, who starred in the original film, and more. It was a sendoff to long time Grammy Awards television producer Kenneth Ehrlich. He retired after a four-decade run of producing the show.

On April 23, 2020, Lauper participated in an online fundraising concert to raise money for LGBTQ nightlife workers who struggled financially because of the COVID-19 pandemic. Lauper ended the concert performing "True Colors". The concert was initiated by the Stonewall Inn Gives Back nonprofit organization of the historic Greenwich Village gay bar. Other performing artists were Kate Pierson of the B-52s, Our Lady J, Rufus Wainwright and Darren Hayes of Savage Garden amongst others.

In 2020, Lauper and Rob Hyman co-wrote the track "Secret to the Formula" for The SpongeBob Movie: Sponge on the Run.

In November 2020, Lauper dueted with former top-10 American Idol finalist Casey Abrams on a cover version of the 1965 protest song "Eve of Destruction", written by P. F. Sloan.

In November 2021, Lauper featured as guest vocalist on the track "Blame it on Christmas" by Shea Diamond. An official video was released the following month.

Lauper performed at the 2022 MusiCares Person of the Year Tribute Show honoring Joni Mitchell on April 1.

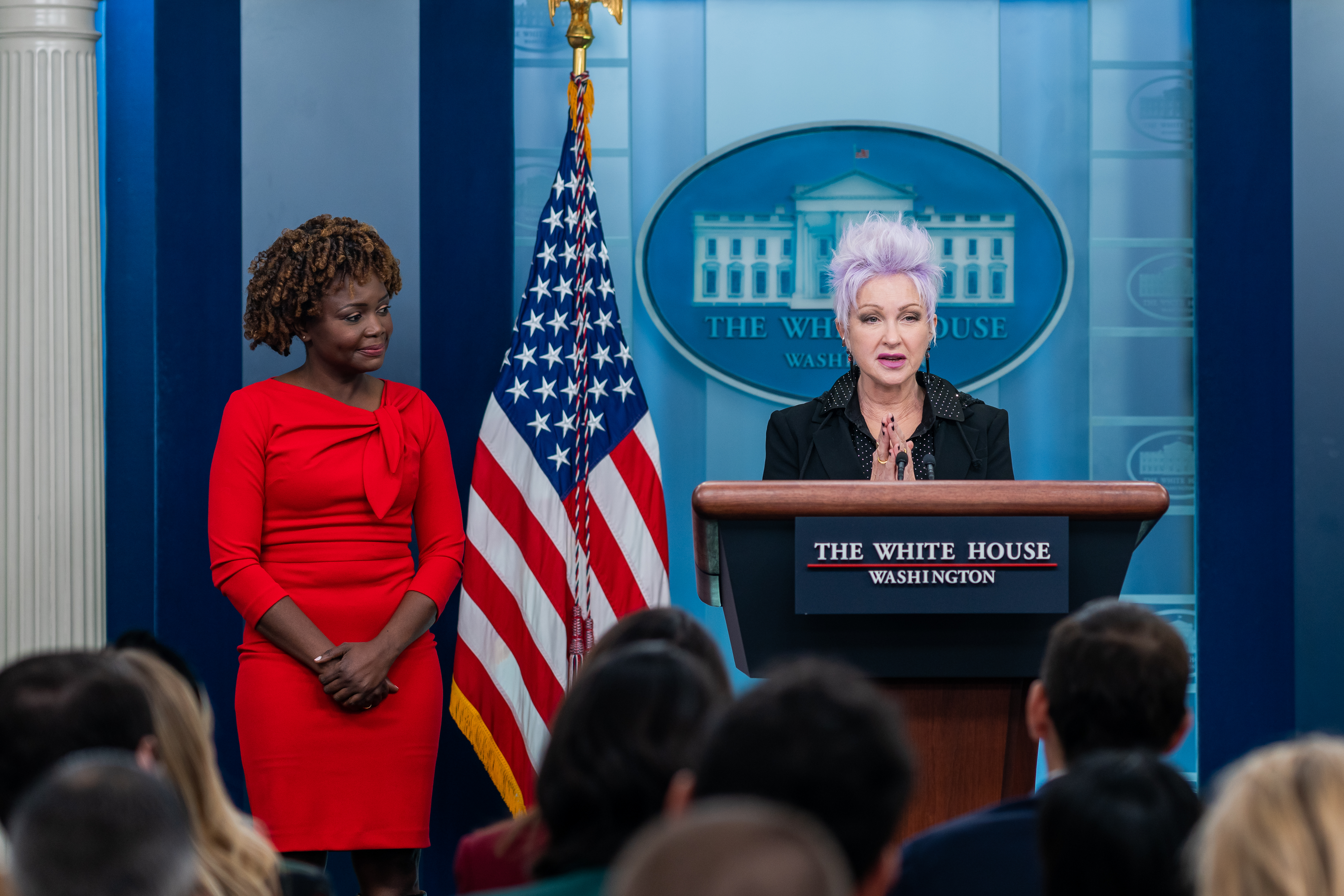
Lauper speaking to reporters at the White House in 2022

In May 2022, it was announced that Alison Ellwood would direct a career retrospective documentary about Lauper. The film, entitled Let the Canary Sing, encased Lauper's 40-plus-year career, and was produced by Sony Music Entertainment. The documentary premiered in June 2023.

In December 2022, Lauper and Alex Nolan performed "True Colors" at a White House celebration. That day, president Joe Biden signed the Respect for Marriage Act into law. Quote, 'The new law provides federal recognition to same-sex marriages, a measure born out of concern that the Supreme Court could reverse its legal support of such relationships'.

In January 2023, she was among the nominees for the Rock and Roll Hall of Fame, "Seeing my name on this year's ballot with so many talents that I admire means so much to me," she adds. "It has been a lifetime privilege to reach so many different kinds of fans with a message of following your own path (and having fun along the way, too)," said Lauper. Lauper was not inducted in 2023, but was selected for induction in 2025.

In July 2023, Lauper released the track "Oh Dolores". The song was written for the black comedy horror television series The Horror of Dolores Roach, released on Prime Video in July 2023. Lauper also had a recurring guest role in the series, though it was canceled after one season.

The soundtrack single "Gonna Be You" from the movie 80 for Brady was released in January 2023. The song was written by Diane Warren, and performed by Dolly Parton, Belinda Carlisle, Cyndi Lauper, Debbie Harry and Gloria Estefan. The official music video shows Parton, Carlisle, Lauper, and Estefan performing while wearing football jerseys similar to the ones worn by the women in the film, interspersed with clips from the film.

=== 2024–present: Let The Canary Sing, Farewell Tour, Rock and Roll Hall of Fame induction, Las Vegas residency ===
February 2024 brought major news for Lauper. She announced collaboration with Pophouse (owned by Björn Ulvaeus) after they bought parts of her song catalog, including "True Colors" and "Girls Just Wanna Have Fun" but not her Broadway music. Future projects would include a television series and a festival, as well as an immersive theater experience.

Let the Canary Sing, a documentary directed by Alison Ellwood about Lauper's career debuted on Paramount+ on June 4, 2024. The soundtrack for the documentary had been released on May 31, 2024. One day before the release of Let the Canary Sing, Lauper announced that she would be holding one last series of concerts before retiring from touring. Her Girls Just Wanna Have Fun Farewell Tour began in Montreal, Canada, on October 18, 2024, and initially ended on August 30, 2025, at the Hollywood Bowl. Lauper stated she wanted to host the farewell tour to properly thank her fans while she was still in good shape. On June 29, 2024, Lauper performed at the Glastonbury Festival in Pilton, Somerset, England. In later time, it was reported that an upcoming concert at the Atlantis Paradise Island in Paradise Island, Bahamas would also be part of the tour Girls Just Want to Have Fun tour as well.

On October 5, 2025, her "Grammy Salute" special, which was held at the Hollywood Bowl, aired on CBS and Paramount+. The next day, the singer announced her first-ever residency, Cyndi Lauper: Live in Las Vegas, taking place at the Colosseum at Caesars Palace (April 24-May 2, 2026).

On November 8, 2025, Lauper was inducted into the Rock and Roll Hall of Fame.

Lauper performed at Rock in Lisboa on June 27 in Lisbon, Portugal.

On July 23, 2026, Mattel released a WWE 3-pack set of action figures on Mattel Creations.com, as well as part of the WWE's 2026 San Diego Comic-Con merchandise, as part of Mattel Creations' "WWE Rock 'n' Wrestling" edition which includes Lauper, Captain Lou Albano and Rowdy Rowdy Piper. This 3-pack action figure set, which would mark the first time Lauper was included as a WWE action figure, pays tribute to the June 16, 1984 episode of Piper's Pit where Lauper and Albano clashed.

On September 15, 2026, Lauper released a 40th Anniversary Edition of her second album True Colors. The anniversary album includes two new songs "The River Cried" and a cover of The Beatles song "Across the Universe". The album also includes a live song from her Paris concert held on March 12, 1987.

On October 20, 2026, Lauper announced her second Las Vegas residency at The Colosseum at Caesars Palace, Las Vegas, that will run February 19–27 and September 3–11, 2027.

== Activism ==
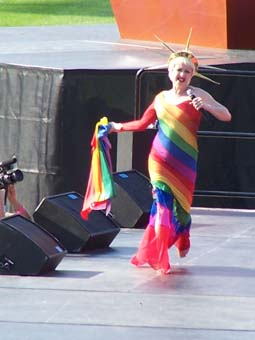
Lauper performing at the Gay Games VII, Wrigley Field, July 22, 2006

Lauper has been an LGBTQ rights supporter throughout her career, campaigning for equality through various charities and gay pride events around the world. Lauper stated that she became involved in gay rights advocacy because her sister Ellen is a lesbian and because Lauper herself was passionate about equality. Lauper cites her sister Ellen as a role model.

Her song "Above the Clouds" celebrates the memory of Matthew Shepard, a young gay man beaten to death in Wyoming. As a member of the Matthew Shepard Foundation Board, Lauper devoted a concert tour in 2005 to promoting the Foundation's message.

She co-founded the True Colors tour for Human Rights throughout the United States and Canada in June 2007. One dollar from each ticket was earmarked for the Human Rights Campaign, which advocates equal rights for LGBTQ individuals.

In 2008, Lauper started True Colors United. The organization works to end youth homelessness, focusing on the experiences of LGBTQ youth. She set up the True Colors Residence in New York City for LGBTQ homeless youths. The 30-bed facility offers temporary shelter and job placement help. In April 2010, TCU launched the Give a Damn campaign, to help get straight people more involved in LGBTQ rights. In December 2022, Lauper performed her song "True Colors" at the ceremony where U.S. President Joe Biden signed the Respect for Marriage Act into law.

In August 2008, she contributed an article titled "Hope" to HuffPost, encouraging Americans to vote for Barack Obama in the 2008 presidential election. Lauper performed at the 2008 Democratic National Convention. During 2022, Lauper launched the Girls Just Want to Have Fundamental Rights Fund, with a mission to support organizations "fighting for the right to abortion and reproductive healthcare".

== Legacy ==
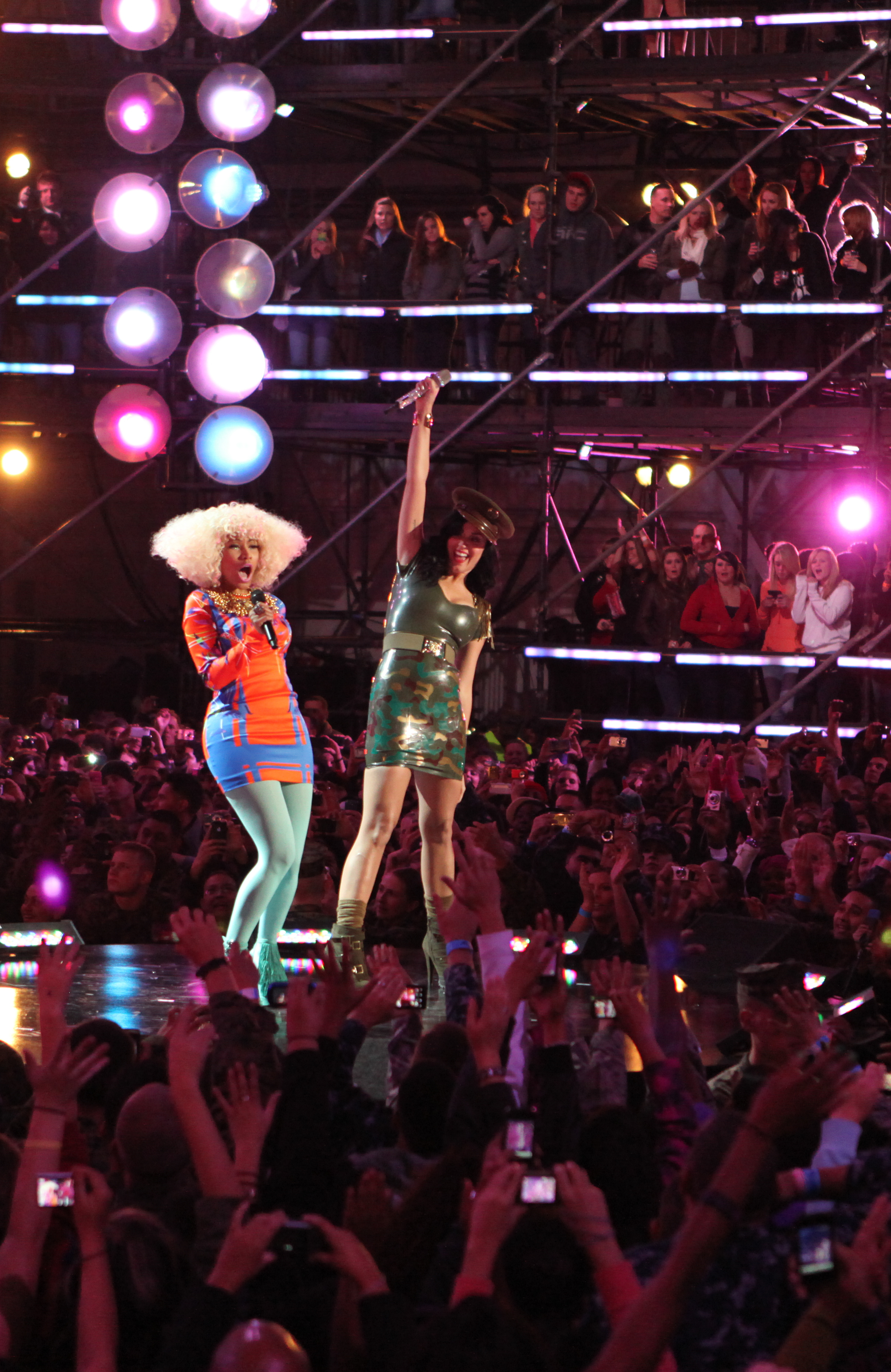
Nicki Minaj and Katy Perry performing "Girls Just Want to Have Fun" at VH1 Divas. Both artists have said that they are influenced by Lauper's sound and look.

Lauper was described by AllMusic's Lindsay Planer as "an iconoclastic vocalist who revolutionized the role of women in rock and roll". Over her 40-year career, she influenced multiple recording artists including Katy Perry, Lady Gaga, Vanessa Paradis, Tegan and Sara, Kim Petras, Nicki Minaj, Poppy and Yelle. Lauper received a star on the Hollywood Walk of Fame in 2015.

Stephen Thomas Erlewine of Spotify said that She's So Unusual and Lauper's distinctive idiosyncratic appearance "helped popularize the image of punk and new wave for America, making it an acceptable part of the pop landscape". Rolling Stone magazine stated that her debut was "arguably the first time explicitly punk-influenced elements were front-and-center on the pop landscape, both musically and via Lauper's Patrick Lucas-styled ensembles, dressing up the droll Reagan decade in feminist chutzpah". The album ranked at number 487 on Rolling Stone's list of 500 Greatest Albums of All Time in 2003. The album ranked at number 41 on Rolling Stone's list of Women Who Rock: The 50 Greatest Albums of All Time in 2012. Rolling Stone's review stated, "A wild and wonderful skyrocket of a voice ... Lauper's extraordinary pipes connect with the right material, the results sound like the beginning of a whole new golden age". Thirty years after its release, Entertainment Weekly called it an "everlastingly saucy supersmash".

Sheila Moeschen argued that "Girls Just Want to Have Fun" "embodied a different kind of feminine aesthetic that ran counter to the raw sensuality and edginess of her contemporaries like Madonna or veteran rockers Joan Jett and Pat Benatar", that introduced "a nation of women to a new kind of female role model, one that celebrated difference and encouraged playfulness in self-expression". John Rockwell wrote that the song was "a giddily upbeat attestation to female pleasure that simultaneously made a feminist statement, fulfilled male fantasies and—especially in its often-played video version—evoked the warmth of family and friends". Its music video won the first-ever Best Female Video prize at the 1984 MTV Video Music Awards. It featured a multicultural cast of women with teased, sideways hair and neon eye shadow, singing alongside Lauper.

"Time After Time" has been covered by over a hundred artists and was ranked at number 22 on Rolling Stone's 100 Best Songs of the Past 25 Years and at number 19 on VH1's 100 Greatest Songs of the 80s.

"She Bop", the third single from She's So Unusual, is the first and only top-ten song to directly mention a gay porn magazine. An ode to masturbation, it was included in the PMRC's "Filthy Fifteen" list that led to the Parental Advisory sticker appearing on recordings thought to be unsuitable for young listeners. In a retrospective, Rolling Stone ranked it the 36th-best song of 1984, praising its unusual playfulness regarding sexuality.

"True Colors" is a gay anthem, after which True Colors United, which advocates for runaway and homeless LGBTQ youth, is named.

In 2019, Lauper gave the commencement address at Northern Vermont University – Johnson, the academic institution that includes Johnson State College (which she attended). At this event, NVU bestowed an honorary degree of Doctor of Letters upon her.

== Personal life ==
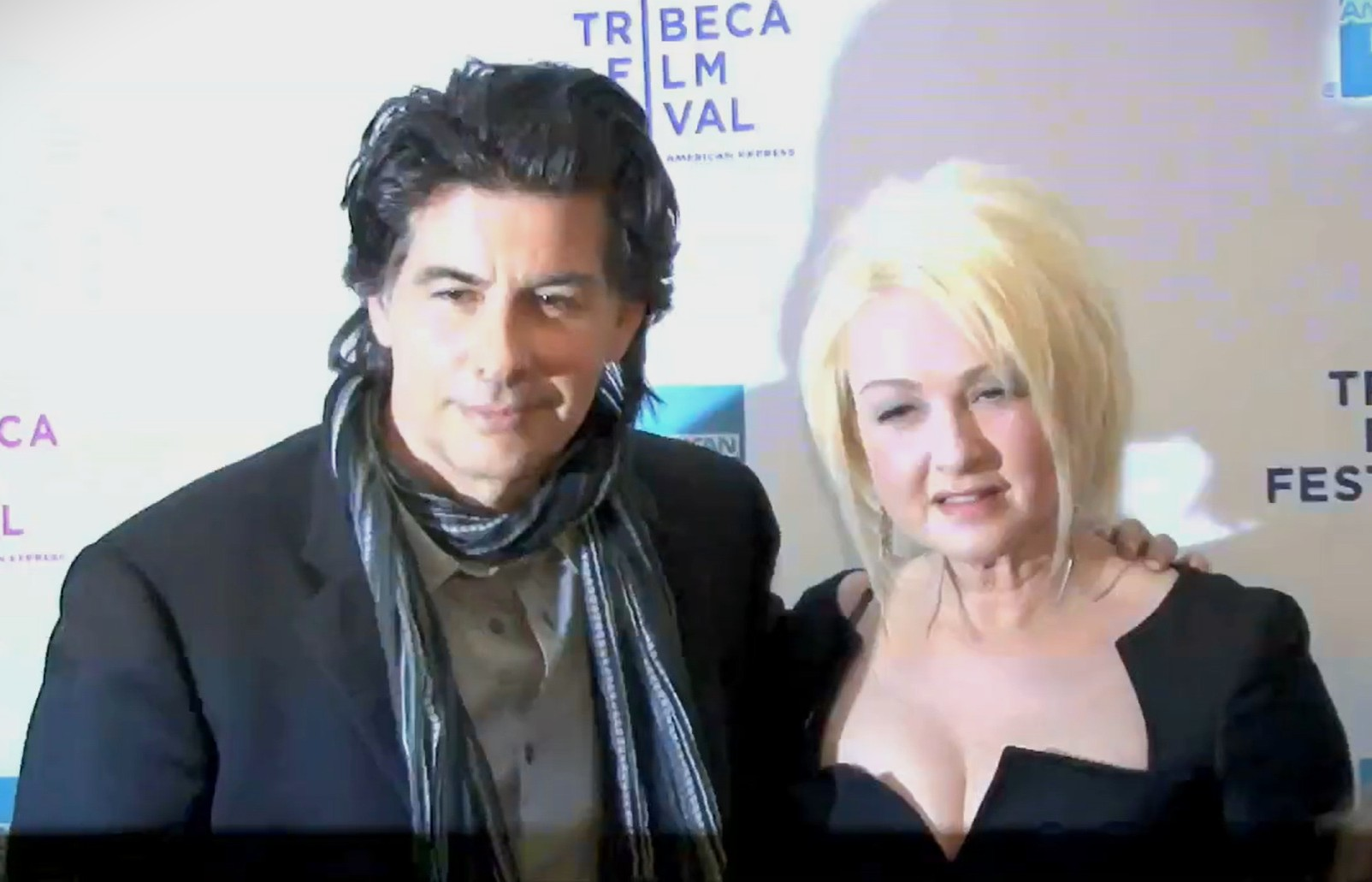
Lauper and her husband, David Thornton, at the Tribeca Film Festival in 2009

On November 24, 1991, Lauper married actor David Thornton. Lauper met Thornton on the set of the film Off and Running (1991). On November 19, 1997, Lauper and Thornton had a son named Declyn Lauper Thornton (Dex Lauper).

== Discography ==
- She's So Unusual (1983)
- True Colors (1986)
- A Night to Remember (1989)
- Hat Full of Stars (1993)
- Sisters of Avalon (1996)
- Merry Christmas ... Have a Nice Life (1998)
- At Last (2003)
- Shine (2004)
- The Body Acoustic (2005)
- Bring Ya to the Brink (2008)
- Memphis Blues (2010)
- Detour (2016)

== Live performances ==
Tours

- Fun Tour (1983–1984)
- True Colors World Tour (1986–1987)
- A Night to Remember Tour (1989)
- Hat Full of Stars Tour (1993–1994)
- Twelve Deadly Cyns (1995)
- Sisters of Avalon Tour (1996)
- Shine Tour (2002–2003)
- At Last Tour (2003–2004)
- The Body Acoustic Tour (2005–2006)
- True Colors (2007–2008)
- Bring Ya to the Brink Tour (2008)
- Girls Night Out (2009)
- Memphis Blues Tour (2010–2011)
- She's So Unusual: 30th Anniversary Tour (2013–2014)
- Detour Tour (2016)
- North American Tour (2017–2018)
- Japan Tour 2019 (2019)
- Girls Just Wanna Have Fun Farewell Tour (2024–2025)

Residencies

- Cyndi Lauper: Live in Las Vegas (2026–2027)

== Filmography ==
=== Theatre ===
Table featuring theatre with Cyndi Lauper
Year	Title	Role	Notes	Ref(s)
2000	Matters of the Heart	Herself	Broadway concert	
2006	The Threepenny Opera	Jenny (Ginny Jenny/Low-Dive Jenny)	Broadway musical	
2013	Kinky Boots	—N/a	Broadway musical (writer)	
2017	SpongeBob SquarePants	—N/a	Broadway musical (writer, "Hero is My Middle Name")	

=== Television ===
Table featuring programs of television with Cyndi Lauper
Year	Title	Role	Notes	Ref(s)
1989	The Super Mario Bros. Super Show!	Herself	Episode: "Robo Koopa/Captain Lou is Missing"	
1990	Mother Goose Rock 'n' Rhyme	Mary ("Mary Had a Little Lamb")	Television film	
1990	The Wall – Live in Berlin	Young Pink	Television film	
1993–1999	Mad About You	Marianne Lugasso	4 episodes	
1999	Happily Ever After: Fairy Tales for Every Child	Pidge	Voice role; Episode: "The Happy Prince"	
1999	The Simpsons	Herself	Voice role; Episode: "Wild Barts Can't Be Broken"	
2004	Higglytown Heroes	Operator Hero	Voice role; Episode: "Smooth Operator"	
2005	That's So Raven	Ms. Petuto	Episode: "Art Breaker"	
2005	Queer as Folk	Herself	Episode: "I Love You"	
2006	Top of the Pops	Co-presenter	Episode: "13/03/2006"	
2007	The Backyardigans	Herself	Voice role; Episode:"International Super Spy"	
2008	Kathy Griffin: My Life on the D-List	Herself	Episode: "Fly the Super Gay Skies"	
2008	As The World Turns	Herself	Episode: "#1.13303"	
2008	Gossip Girl	Herself	Episode: "Bonfire of the Vanity"	
2009	30 Rock	Herself	Episode: "Kidney Now!"	
2009	The Apprentice: The Celebrity Apprentice 3	Herself / Contestant	Episode: "#9.4"	
2009–2017	Bones	Avalon Harmonia	5 episodes	
2012	Bob's Burgers	Performer	Voice role; Episode: "The Belchies"	
2012	Happily Divorced	Kiki Kappelmaster	Episode: "Follow the Leader"	
2013	Cyndi Lauper: Still So Unusual	Herself	12 episodes; Executive producer	
2014	Front and Center	Herself	Episode: "Cyndi Lauper"	
2018	Magnum P.I.	Vanessa Nero	Episode: "Sudden Death"	
2020	Young Sheldon	Herself	Voice role; Episode: "A Baby Tooth and the Egyptian God of Knowledge"	
2020	Bubble Guppies	Miss Goo Goo	Voice role; Episode: "Super Baby!"	
2020–2021	Project Runway	Herself (Guest Judge)	Episodes: "She's Sew Unusual" (Season 18) and "Couch Couture" (Season 19)	
2023	The Horror of Dolores Roach	Ruthie	Episodes: "I Never Don't Find 'Em" (Season 1) and "Blink Twice" (Season 1)	

=== Film ===
Table featuring feature films with Cyndi Lauper
Year	Title	Role	Notes	Ref(s)
1984	Prime Cuts	Herself	Cameo appearance	
1985	The Goonies	Herself	Cameo appearance	
1988	Vibes	Sylvia Pickel	Comedy film	
1991	Off and Running	Cyd Morse	Comedy film	
1993	Life with Mikey	Geena Briganti	Comedy film	
1994	Mrs. Parker and the Vicious Circle	Picnic Guest	Uncredited	
1996	Sesame Street Elmocize	Twyla	Direct-to-video	
2000	The Opportunists	Sally Mahon	Drama film	
2005	The Naked Brothers Band: The Movie	Herself	Cameo appearance	
2009	Here and There	Rose	Serbian-German film	
2011	National Lampoon's Dirty Movie	Little Johnny's Mom	Comedy film	
2014	Henry & Me	Nurse Cyndi	Voice role	

== Awards and nominations ==
=== Grammy Awards ===
The Grammy Awards are awarded annually by the National Academy of Recording Arts and Sciences. Lauper has won two awards from 16 nominations.

Year	Nominee / work	Award	Result
1985	Cyndi Lauper	Best New Artist	Won
1985	She's So Unusual	Album of the Year	Nominated
1985	"Time After Time"	Song of the Year	Nominated
1985	"Girls Just Want to Have Fun"	Record of the Year	Nominated
1985	"Girls Just Want to Have Fun"	Best Female Pop Vocal Performance	Nominated
1986	"What a Thrill"	Best Female Rock Vocal Performance	Nominated
1987	"True Colors"	Best Female Pop Vocal Performance	Nominated
1987	"911"	Best Female Rock Vocal Performance	Nominated
1988	"Cyndi Lauper in Paris"	Best Performance Music Video	Nominated
1990	"I Drove All Night"	Best Female Rock Vocal Performance	Nominated
1999	"Disco Inferno"	Best Dance Recording	Nominated
2005	"Unchained Melody"	Best Instrumental Arrangement Accompanying Vocalist(s)	Nominated
2009	Bring Ya to the Brink	Best Electronic/Dance Album	Nominated
2011	Memphis Blues	Best Traditional Blues Album	Nominated
2014	Kinky Boots	Best Musical Theater Album	Won
2017	Kinky Boots (Original West End Cast)	Best Musical Theater Album	Nominated

Note: She's So Unusual also won Best Album Package in 1985. Best Album Package is credited to the art director and not the performer. The art director was Janet Perr.

Note: "We Are the World" (which featured Cyndi Lauper as a vocalist) also won Song of the Year, Record of the Year, Best Music Video, Short Form, and Best Pop Performance by a Duo or Group with Vocal in 1986. Song of the Year is credited to the songwriters and not the performer. The song was written by Michael Jackson and Lionel Richie. Record of the Year and Best Pop Performance by a Duo or Group were presented to the producer in 1986, the song was produced by Quincy Jones. Best Music Video, Short Form is presented to the director and producer, Tom Trbovich directed the video while Quincy Jones served as producer.

Note: Lauper received a Grammy nomination for Best Instrumental Arrangement Accompanying Vocalist(s), as she was one of the three arrangers along with Steve Gaboury and Don Sebesky.

=== Tony Awards ===
The Antoinette Perry Award for Excellence in Theatre, more commonly known informally as the Tony Award, recognizes achievement in live Broadway theatre. The awards are presented by The Broadway League at an annual ceremony in New York City. Lauper is the first woman to win a Tony solo for Best Score.

Year	Production	Category	Result
2013	Kinky Boots	Best Original Score	Won
2018	SpongeBob SquarePants	Best Original Score	Nominated

=== Emmy Awards ===
An Emmy Award recognizes excellence in the television industry.

Year	Production	Category	Result
1994	Mad About You: "A Pair of Hearts"	Outstanding Guest Actress in a Comedy Series	Nominated
1995	Mad About You: "Money Changes Everything"	Outstanding Guest Actress in a Comedy Series	Won

=== MTV Video Music Award ===
The MTV Video Music Awards were established in 1984 by MTV to celebrate the top music videos of the year. Lauper won one award from 14 nominations, the first Best Female Video.

Year	Nominee / work	Award	Result
1984	"Girls Just Want to Have Fun"	Video of the Year	Nominated
1984	"Girls Just Want to Have Fun"	Best New Artist	Nominated
1984	"Girls Just Want to Have Fun"	Best Female Video	Won
1984	"Girls Just Want to Have Fun"	Best Concept Video	Nominated
1984	"Girls Just Want to Have Fun"	Viewer's Choice	Nominated
1984	"Girls Just Want to Have Fun"	Best Overall Performance	Nominated
1984	"Time After Time"	Best New Artist	Nominated
1984	"Time After Time"	Best Female Video	Nominated
1984	"Time After Time"	Best Direction	Nominated
1987	"True Colors"	Best Female Video	Nominated
1987	"What's Going On"	Best Cinematography	Nominated

=== Other recognition ===
Year	By	List	Work	Ranked
1993	Rolling Stone	The 100 Top Music Videos	"Girls Just Want to Have Fun"	No. 22
1999	VH1	100 Greatest Women of Rock & Roll	Cyndi Lauper	No. 58
1999	MTV	100 Greatest Videos Ever Made	"Girls Just Want to Have Fun"	No. 39
1999	Rolling Stone	100 Best Albums of the '80s	She's So Unusual	No. 75
2000	Rolling Stone	100 Greatest Pop Songs	"Time After Time"	No. 66
2000	MTV	100 Greatest Pop Songs	"Time After Time"	No. 66
2001	VH1	100 Greatest Videos	"Girls Just Want to Have Fun"	No. 45
2002	Rolling Stone	50 Essential "Women in Rock" Albums	She's So Unusual	No. 41
2003	VH1	100 Best Songs of the Past 25 Years	"Time After Time"	No. 22
2003	Rolling Stone	500 Greatest Albums of All Time	She's So Unusual	No. 494
2006	VH1	100 Greatest Songs of the 80's	"Time After Time"	No. 19
2006	VH1	100 Greatest Songs of the 80's	"Girls Just Want to Have Fun"	No. 23
2017	VH1	VH1 Trailblazer Honor	LGBTQ activism	
2019	Library of Congress	National Recording Registry	She's So Unusual	
2025	Rock and Roll Hall of Fame	Class of 2025 inductee		

== See also ==
- List of artists who reached number one in the United States
- List of awards and nominations received by Cyndi Lauper
- Lists of Billboard number-one singles
- Timeline of Billboard number-one dance songs
