= Blue & Lonesome =

Blue & Lonesome can refer to:

- "Blue and Lonesome" (Little Walter song), 1959, later covered by the Rolling Stones
- "Blue and Lonesome" (Memphis Slim song), 1949
- Blue & Lonesome (George Jones album), 1964
- Blue & Lonesome (Rolling Stones album), 2016
