= Soulsville =

Soulsville may refer to:

- "Soulsville", a song by Isaac Hayes, from the film soundtrack album Shaft
- Soulsville (Huey Lewis and the News album), 2010
- Soulsville (Beverley Knight album), 2016
- Soulsville Charter School
- Soulsville U.S.A., a nickname for the former home of the Stax Records studio, now the Stax Museum of American Soul Music

== See also ==
- Soulville, an album by Ben Webster
