= The Bo-Keys =

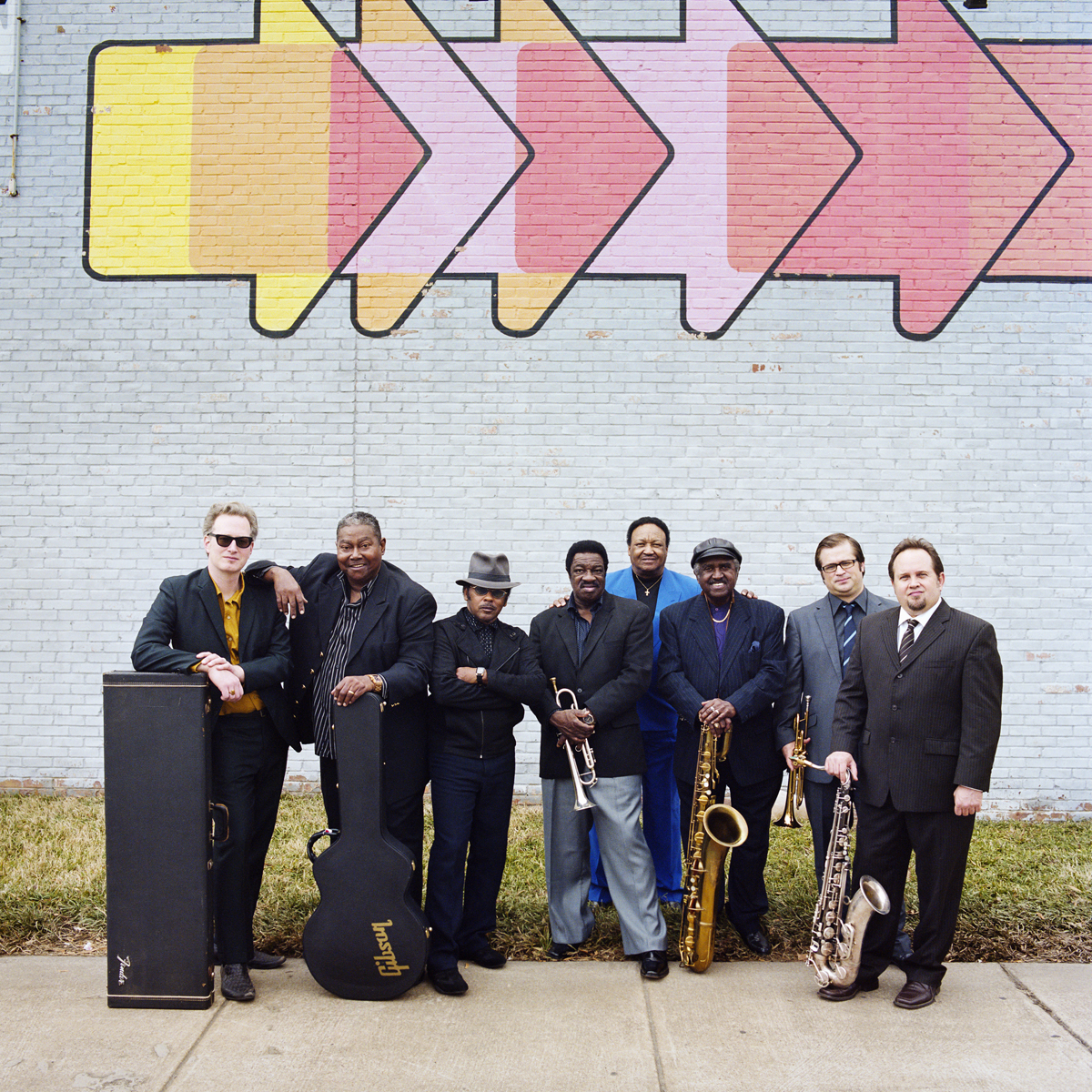
- Promo photo for Got to Get Back

Background information
- Origin: Memphis, Tennessee, U.S.
- Genres: Soul jazz
- Years active: 1998–present
- Labels: Electraphonic Recording
- Members: Scott Bomar; Charles "Skip" Pitts; Ben Cauley; Howard Grimes; Archie Turner; Joe Restivo; Marc Franklin; Kirk Smothers; Art Edmainston; Derrick Williams; Jim Spake
- Website: The Bo-Keys official website

The Bo-Keys are a soul jazz band from Memphis, Tennessee, formed as an homage to the city's rich musical tradition.

== History ==
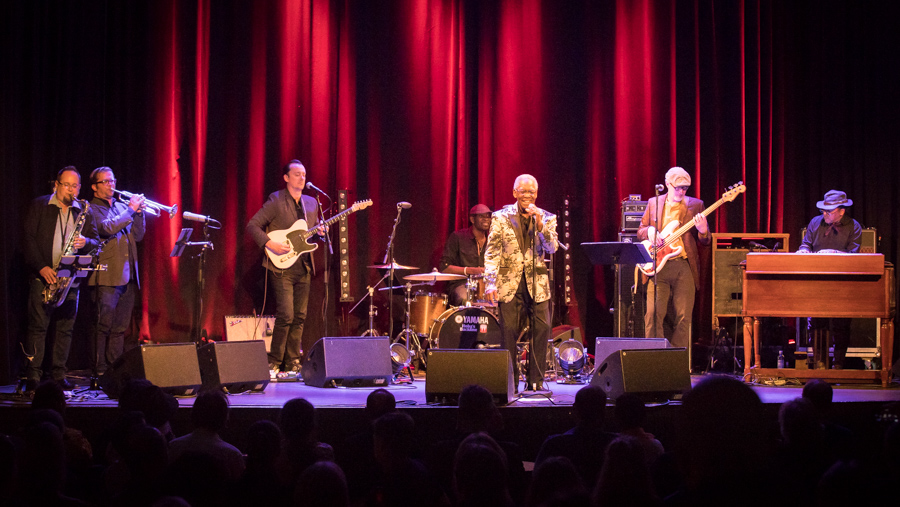
The Bo-Keys onstage with Don Bryant in 2017

In 1998, Scott Bomar was asked to assemble a backing band for former Stax artist and songwriter Sir Mack Rice. His concept was to form an updated version of the quintessential Memphis sound embodied by players like Charles "Skip" Pitts and Ben Cauley, a formidable task he confronted by recruiting the very musicians who served as his inspiration.

The Bo-Keys have performed live at various festivals, including The Ponderosa Stomp, London's Barbican Performing Arts Centre, and Lincoln Center's Midsummer Nights Swing Series.

In the spring of 2003, The Bo-Keys recorded their debut album, the critically acclaimed The Royal Sessions, at Willie Mitchell's Royal Studio. The group then performed the score for the Academy Award–winning film Hustle and Flow, as well as the song "Kick It" for the Paramount/Nickelodeon animated feature Barnyard.

In 2008, The Bo-Keys appeared in the film Soul Men, including an on-screen performance with stars Samuel L. Jackson and Bernie Mac. Bomar produced three songs for the film's soundtrack, most notably Anthony Hamilton's "Soul Music," which was nominated for a Grammy.

In 2010, The Bo-Keys were featured on Cyndi Lauper's Memphis Blues, on which Bomar served as producer. The album was nominated for a Grammy in the category of Best Traditional Blues Album.

The band's second album, Got to Get Back!, was released on June 21, 2011.

In 2012, The Bo-Keys featuring Percy Wiggins on vocals recorded a version of "Stuck in the Middle with You" for a fundraising CD titled Super Hits of the Seventies for radio station WFMU.

The song "I'm Still in Need" featuring Percy Wiggins from the Writing on the Wall EP was in the film Grudge Match (2013).

== Band members ==
- A chance meeting between Bomar and guitarist Skip Pitts at Memphis' Stax Music Academy (where both taught at-risk youth) led to the current incarnation of The Bo-Keys. Pitts, long time bandleader for Isaac Hayes, appears on Hayes' iconic title track from the 1971 movie Shaft as well as "Do The Funky Chicken" by Rufus Thomas, "I'll Be the Other Woman" by the Soul Children, "It's Your Thing" by the Isley Brothers, and "Rainbow '65" by Gene Chandler.
- Drummer Howard Grimes is a best known as a member of the Hi Rhythm Section that appeared through the 1970s on records by Al Green, Ann Peebles, and Syl Johnson. Grimes first performed in public at the age of 12 with Rufus Thomas. By his late teens, he regularly recorded on sessions for Satellite Records, the precursor to Stax. He also began working with bandleader and record producer Willie Mitchell at Hi Records. As a key member of the house band at Mitchell's Royal Recording Studios in Memphis, Grimes was instrumental in creating some of the most memorable songs and soul grooves of the 1970s.
- Keyboardist Archie "Hubbie" Turner is also a member of the Hi Rhythm Section and former session player at Willie Mitchell's Royal Studio. Further, Archie was a member of The Pac-Keys, The Martinis and Black Rock.
- Vocalist Percy Wiggins cut sides in 1966-1967 for RCA Victor and Atco Records with a band which included Billy Cox and Larry Lee, who later played Woodstock and became members of Jimi Hendrix's Band of Gypsies.
- Trumpeter and vocalist Ben Cauley is a founding member of the original Bar-Kays and the only surviving member of the fatal crash in Madison, Wisconsin, which took the lives of his band mates and Otis Redding. Ben has played numerous sessions in Memphis and Muscle Shoals, Alabama, with everyone from Jerry Lee Lewis to The Doobie Brothers.
- Trumpeter Marc Franklin and sax men Kirk Smothers, Art Edmaiston, Derrick Williams, and Jim Spake have recorded and performed live with Rufus Thomas, Ike Turner, Bobby "Blue" Bland, Gregg Allman, JJ Grey & Mofro, Lucero, and Al Green.

== Discography ==
- 2004: The Royal Sessions
- 2009: Work That Skirt EP
- 2011: Got to Get Back!
- 2012: Writing On the Wall EP
- 2013: I Need More Than One Lifetime EP
- 2013: Dark End of the Street EP
- 2014: Electraphonic Singles, Vol. 1 compilation
- 2016: Heartaches By the Number
