= Memphis Blues (album) =

Studio album by Cyndi Lauper
- Released: June 22, 2010
- Recorded: March 2010
- Studios: Electraphonic Studios, Memphis, Tennessee
- Genre: Blues
- Length: 45:41
- Label: Downtown
- Producers: Cyndi Lauper; Scott Bomar

Cyndi Lauper chronology
True Colors: The Best of Cyndi Lauper (2009)	Memphis Blues (2010)	Kinky Boots (2013)

Singles from Memphis Blues
- 1. "Just Your Fool" Released: 18 May 2010

Professional ratings
Aggregate scores
Source	Rating
Metacritic	45/100
Review scores
Source	Rating
AllMusic	2.5/5 stars
Billboard	4/5 stars
The Guardian	3/5 stars
Mojo	3/5 stars
New York Post	3.5/4 stars
Q	1/5 stars
Record Collector	2/5 stars
Rolling Stone	3.5/5 stars
Slant Magazine	2/5 stars
Uncut	2/10

Memphis Blues is the eleventh studio album by American singer Cyndi Lauper, containing cover versions of classic blues songs. Regarded as a continuation of her 2008 comeback, the album was a nominee for the Grammy Awards 2010 and was released on her 57th birthday, June 22, 2010. According to the Brazilian daily newspaper O Globo, the album had sold 600,000 copies worldwide by November 2010. Memphis Blues was voted the 7th best album of 2010 by the New York Post, and it went on to become Billboard's biggest selling blues album of 2010. To support the album, Lauper made her biggest tour ever, the Memphis Blues Tour, which had more than 140 shows.

== Background ==
Lauper announced via her official Twitter account in December 2009 that she would be recording a blues album. Sessions were held in March 2010 at Electraphonic Studios in Memphis, Tennessee, with producer Scott Bomar, her frequent collaborator Bill Wittman, and special guests B. B. King, Charlie Musselwhite, Ann Peebles and Allen Toussaint.

== Promotion ==
Lauper performed songs from the album on the Late Show with David Letterman on June 14, on The Joy Behar Show on June 21, The Howard Stern Show and The Ellen DeGeneres Show on June 22, Good Morning America on June 23 and Live with Regis and Kelly on June 24, on The Early Show on July 20. and on The Tonight Show with Jay Leno on August 30.

Lauper has supported the album with the Memphis Blues Tour.

Lauper was honored at the 2010 NARM Awards and performed several songs from the Memphis Blues album at the event.

== Commercial reception ==
Memphis Blues debuted at number one on the U.S. Billboard Top Blues chart and at number 26 on the official Billboard 200, with a moderately successful first week sales of more than 16,000 copies. The album is Lauper's third-highest charting album on the Billboard 200 of her career, trailing only her first two releases, She's So Unusual and True Colors. The album remained at No. 1 on the Billboard Blues chart for thirteen weeks, totaling 40 weeks in the chart. The album has sold 76,000 copies in the United States as of May 2016. In 2011 it was awarded a double silver certification from the Independent Music Companies Association which indicated sales of at least 40,000 copies throughout Europe. In Brazil, the album sold around 10,000 units.

Seven songs from the album ranked in the Top 25 on Billboard's Blues Digital Songs chart, including "Crossroads" at number one.

== Track listing ==
Memphis Blues – Standard edition
No.	Title	Writer(s)	Length
1.	"Just Your Fool" (featuring Charlie Musselwhite)	Marion Walter Jacobs	3:37
2.	"Shattered Dreams" (featuring Allen Toussaint)	Lowell Fulson, Washington Ferdinand	3:52
3.	"Early in the Mornin'" (featuring Allen Toussaint and B.B. King)	Leo Hickman, Louis Jordan, Dallas Bartley	3:51
4.	"Romance in the Dark"	William Lee Conley Broonzy, Lillian Green	5:44
5.	"How Blue Can You Get?" (featuring Jonny Lang)	Jane Feather	5:23
6.	"Down Don't Bother Me" (featuring Charlie Musselwhite)	Albert King	3:03
7.	"Don't Cry No More"	Don Robey	2:44
8.	"Rollin' and Tumblin'" (featuring Ann Peebles)	Muddy Waters	3:29
9.	"Down So Low"	Tracy Nelson	3:55
10.	"Mother Earth" (featuring Allen Toussaint)	Memphis Slim, Peter Chatman	5:19
11.	"Crossroads" (featuring Jonny Lang)	Robert Johnson	4:44
Total length:			45:41

Memphis Blues – Amazon.com edition / European edition
No.	Title	Writer(s)	Length
12.	"Wild Women Don't Have the Blues"	Ida Cox	3:22
Total length:			49:03

Memphis Blues – Latin American edition
No.	Title	Writer(s)	Length
13.	"I Don't Want to Cry" (featuring Léo Gandelman)	Chuck Jackson	4:39
Total length:			53:42

Memphis Blues – Japanese edition
No.	Title	Writer(s)	Length
13.	"Don't Want to Cry" (featuring TOKU)	Chuck Jackson	4:34
Total length:			53:37

Memphis Blues – 2 Disc Japanese edition (DVD)
No.	Title	Length
1.	"Behind The Scenes Video Of Making Of 'Memphis Blues'"	4:36
2.	"Cyndi Talking About 'Memphis Blues'"	2:30
Total length:		7:06

== Personnel ==
- Cyndi Lauper – lead vocals, production
- Charles "Skip" Pitts – guitar
- Lester Snell – guitar
- Charlie Musselwhite – harmonica
- Allen Toussaint – keyboards
- William Wittman – bass, engineer
- Leroy Hodges – bass
- Howard Grimes – drums
- Marc Franklin – trumpet
- Derrick Williams – tenor saxophone
- Kirk Smothers – baritone saxophone
- B.B. King – vocals and guitar on "Early in the Mornin"
- Jonny Lang – vocals and guitar on "How Blue Can You Get" and "Crossroads"
- Ann Peebles – vocals on "Rollin' and Tumblin"
- Scott Bomar – production

== Charts ==
Weekly charts

Chart (2010–2011)	Peak position
Australian Albums Chart	59
Belgium Albums Chart (Wallonia)	79
Belgium Albums Chart (Flanders)	77
Canadian Albums Chart	45
French Albums Chart	31
German Albums Chart	77
Greek Albums Chart	45
Japanese Albums Chart	41
Swiss Albums Chart	77
UK Albums Chart	105
UK Independent Albums	13
UK Album Downloads Chart	89
U.S. Billboard 200	26
U.S. Billboard Blues Albums	1
U.S. Billboard Digital Albums	21
U.S. Billboard Independent Albums	2
U.S. Billboard Internet Albums	10
U.S. Billboard Tastemaker Albums	12

Year-end chart

Chart (2010)	Peak position
U.S. Billboard Blues Albums	1

Songs

Year	Songs	Peak positions					
Year	Songs	Billboard Digital Blues Songs	Canadian Blues Songs	New Zealand Blues Songs	Japan Blues Songs	Irish Singles Chart	Italian Singles Chart
2010	"Just Your Fool"	2	1	10	1	66	—
2010	"Crossroads"	1	—	—	15	—	—
2010	"How Blue Can You Get?"	9	5	20	—	—	—
2010	"Rollin' and Tumblin'"	12	3	2	4	—	—
2010	"Early in the Mornin'"	14	5	2	5	—	—
2010	"Romance in the Dark"	17	—	—	—	—	—
2010	"Shattered Dreams"	25	—	—	1	—	—
2010	"Wild Women Don't Get the Blues"	—	—	—	—	—	43
2010	"I Don't Want to Cry"	—	—	—	1	—	—

== Accolades ==
Year	Nominee / work	Award	Result
2011	Memphis Blues	Best Traditional Blues Album	Nominated
