= Electraphonic Recording =

American recording studio and record label

Coordinates: 35°7′35″N 90°3′34″W

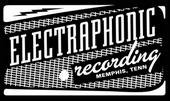
- Founder: Scott Bomar
- Headquarters: Memphis, Tennessee
- Website: electraphonicrecording.com

Electraphonic Recording is a recording studio and record label located in Memphis, Tennessee.

== History ==
Electraphonic Recording was established in 2005 by producer and composer Scott Bomar following an agreement to work as composer on Craig Brewer's Hustle & Flow. Initially functioning as a studio, Electraphonic became a label with the 2006 release of Night Full of Sirens: Anthology '93-'97, a compilation of material from the band Impala. Bomar continued to grow the business in the months and years that followed with a focus on bolstering the vintage Memphis soul sound. In 2007, Electraphonic moved into a downtown Memphis studio space with vintage analog equipment including an MCI 416B recording console and a Scully 280 1" 8-Track Tape Machine plus ProTools and other modern software.

Currently, Electraphonic operates from Sam Phillips Recording as a venue for music, film, and television recording.

== Music ==
Among Electraphonic's more notable releases, Cyndi Lauper entered the studio for a two-week span in 2010 and emerged with the Grammy-nominated Memphis Blues album, which featured B.B. King, Allen Toussaint, Charlie Musslewhite, Johnny Lang, and Ann Peebles. The album was #1 on the Billboard Blues chart for 13 weeks.

Other projects include a multitude of releases by Bomar's multi-generational R&B outfit The Bo-Keys, two full-length albums by Memphis-based organ-soul trio The City Champs, and recordings with Jay Reatard, Jack Yarber, Willem Maker, and Jason Mraz's Grooveline Horns, among others.

== TV & Film ==
Electraphonic has also hosted a variety of TV and film projects, including the Emmy-winning I Am A Man: From Memphis, A Lesson in Life, MTV's $5 Cover series, Craig Brewer's Black Snake Moan and Academy Award-winning Hustle & Flow, Soul Men (featuring Anthony Hamilton’s Grammy-nominated "Soul Music"), Giancarlo Esposito's Gospel Hill, and the Kevin Smith supported Losers Take All.

== Equipment ==
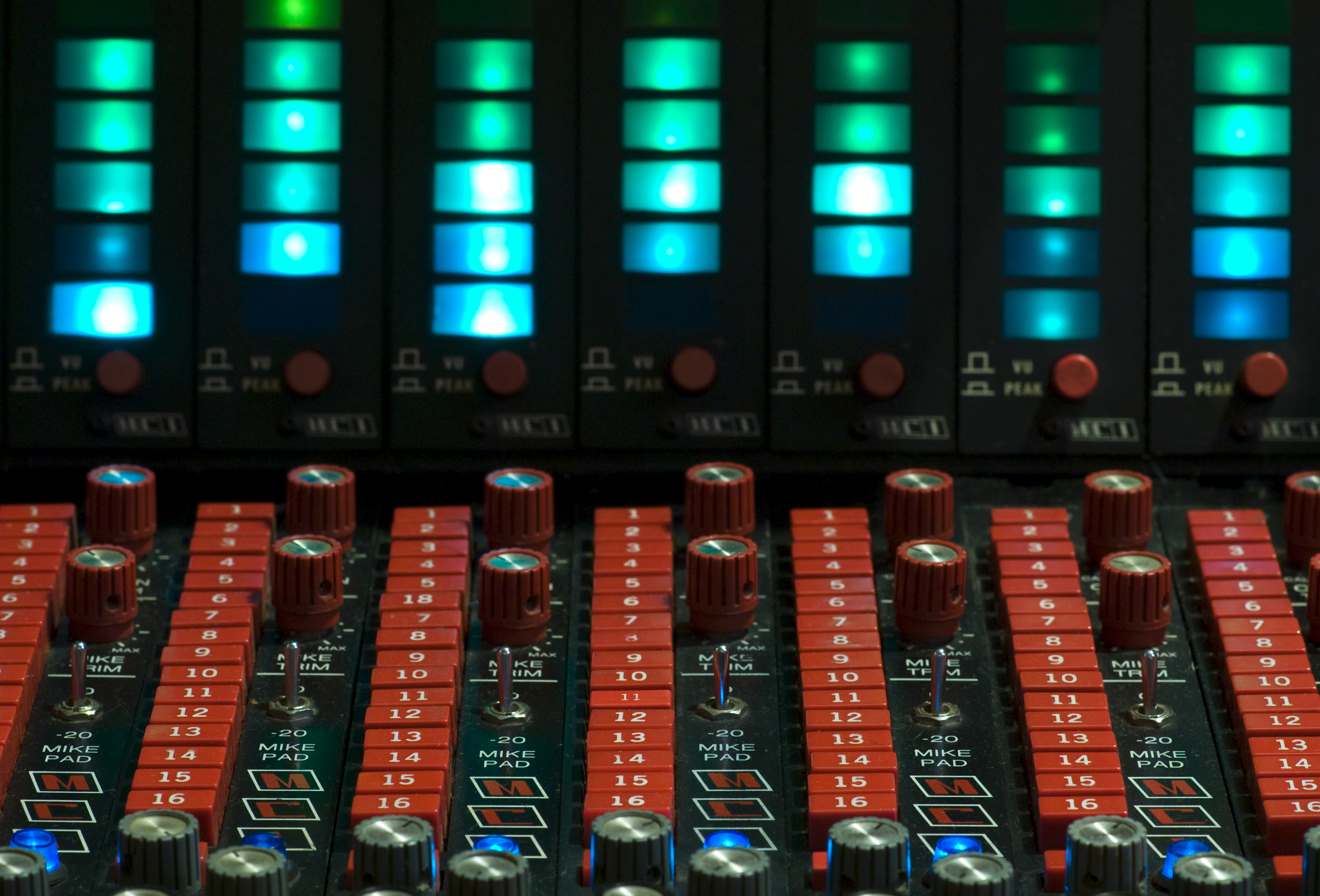
Electraphonic Recording's MCI 416B console Music Center Incorporated (MCI)

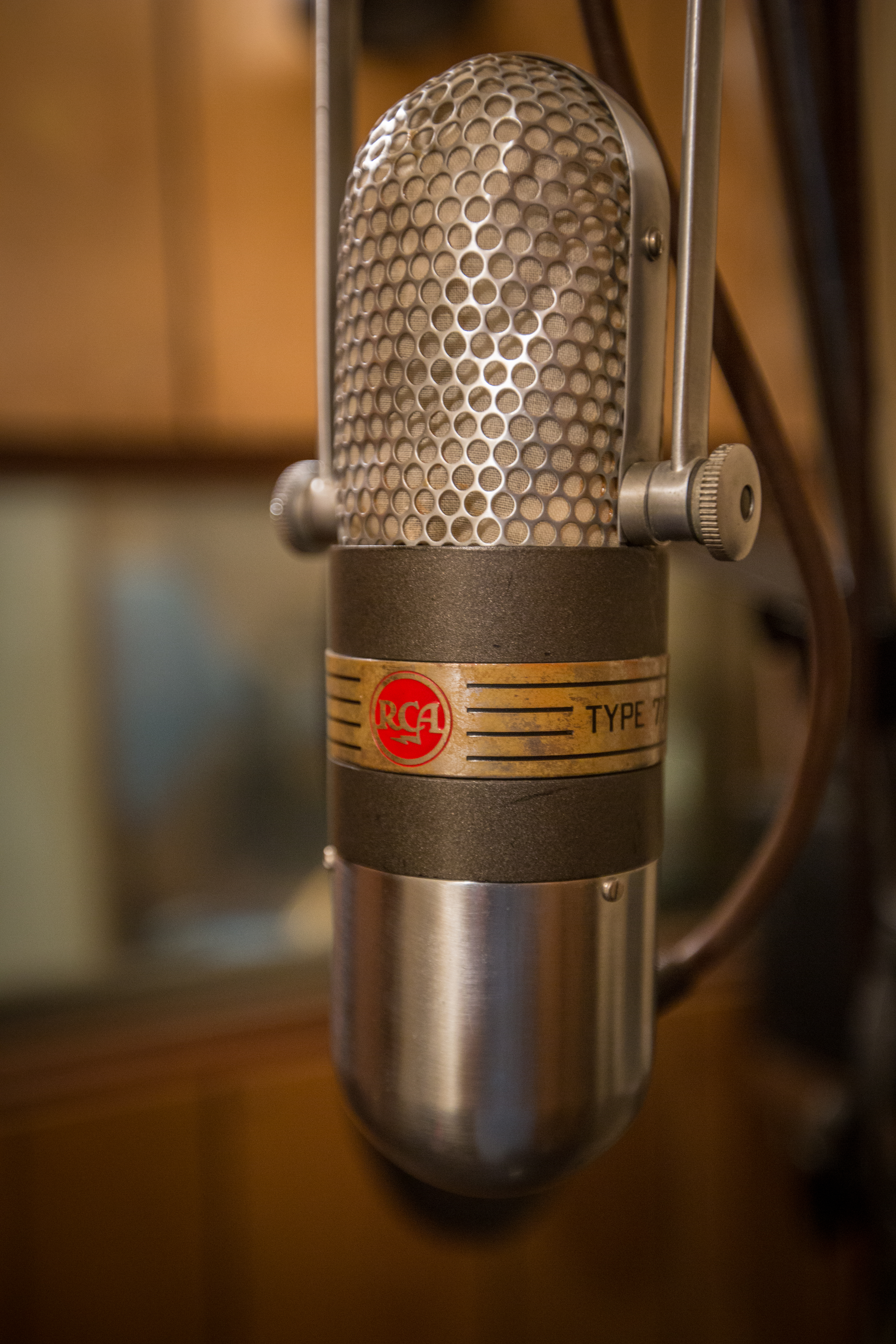
RCA 77DX Ribbon Mic from Electraphonic's mic collection

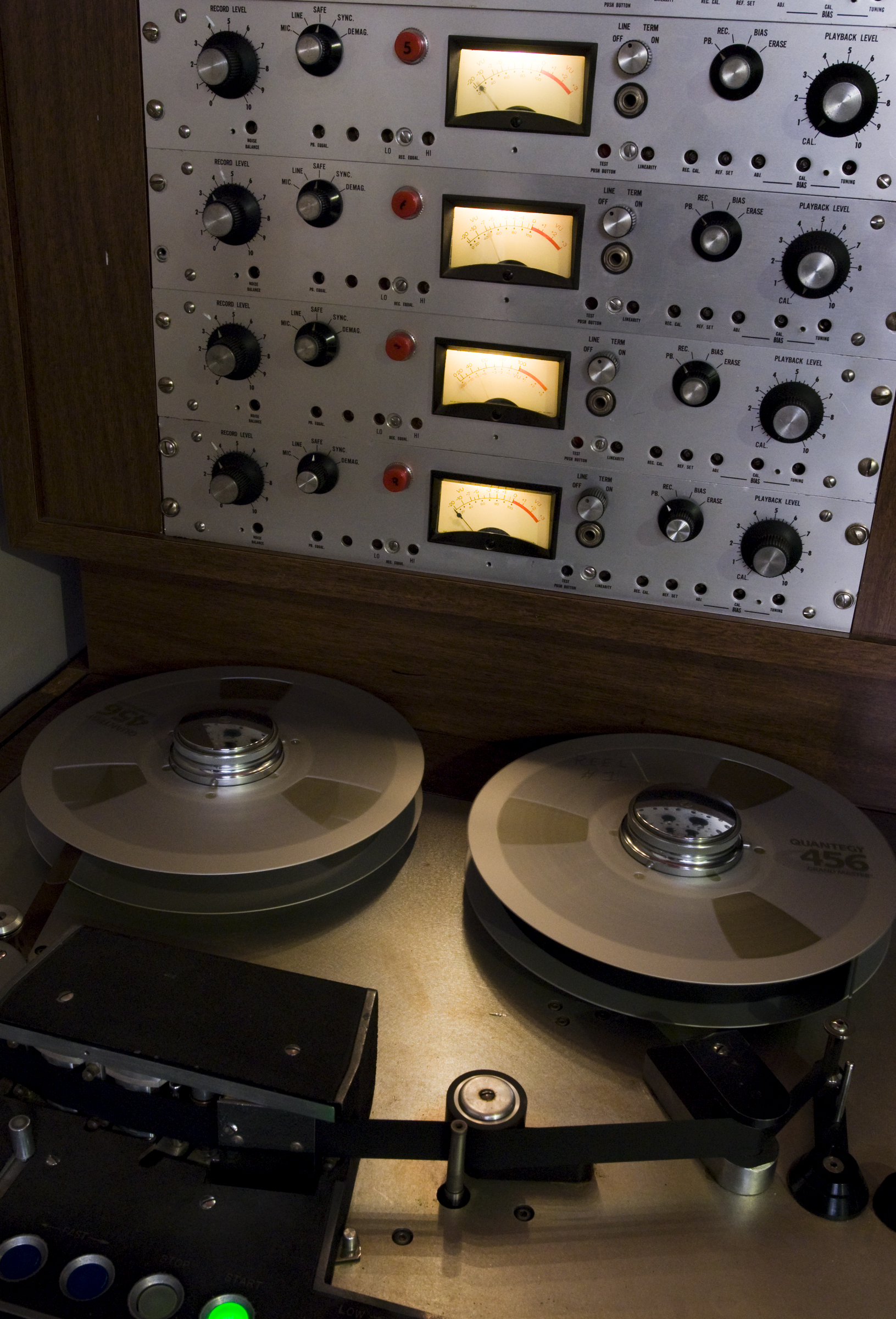
Electraphonic Recording's Scully 8 track 1" tape machine

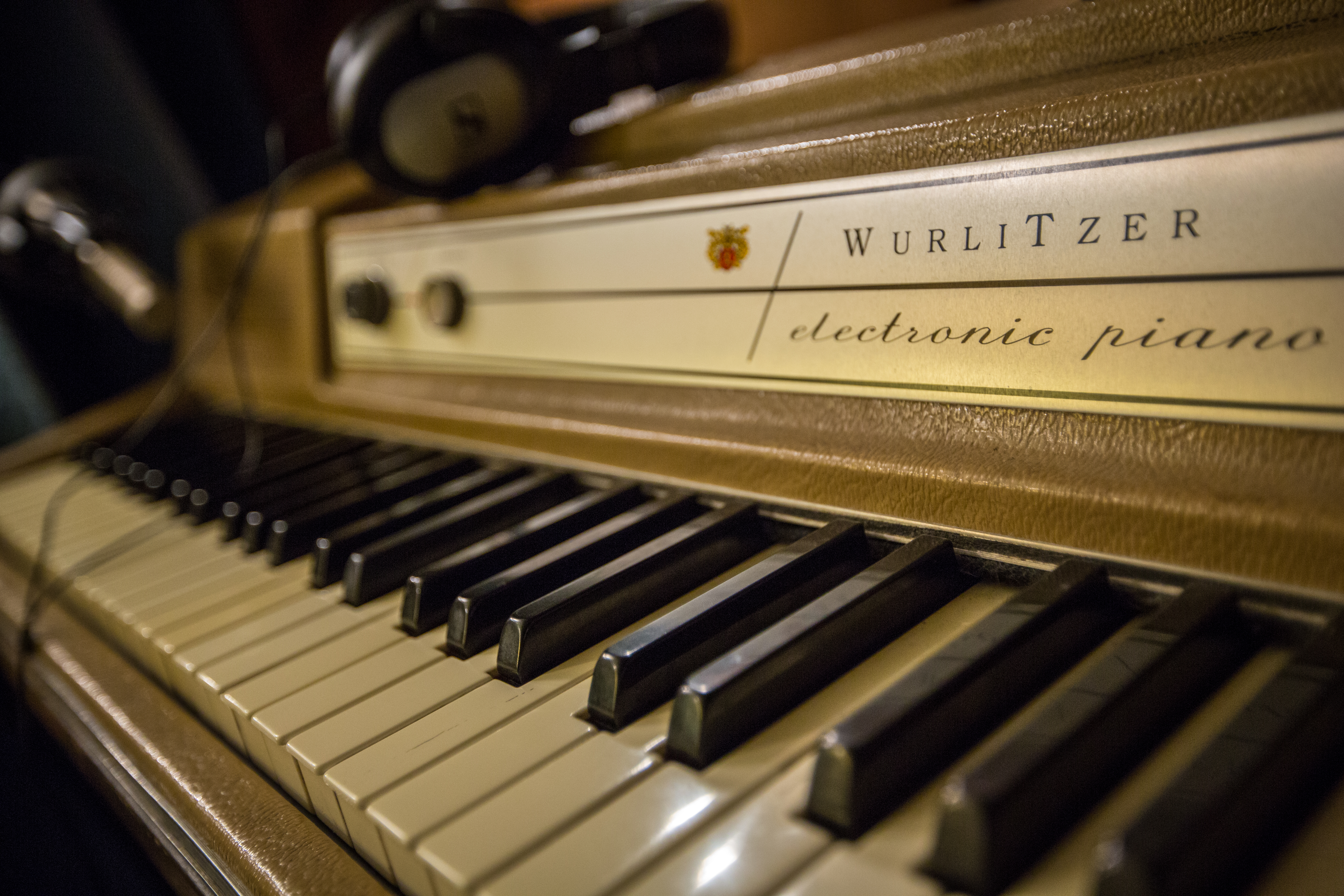
Electraphonic Recording's Wurlitzer electric piano
