= Toku (musician) =

TOKU
- Born: February 20, 1973 (age 53)
- Origin: Niigata Prefecture, Japan
- Genre: Jazz
- Years active: 2000–present
- Labels: Sony Music Records Inc., Porumani Ltd.
- Website: toku-jazz.com

Toku (styled TOKU) is a Japanese jazz musician from Niigata Prefecture, Japan.

In addition to being one of the few professional jazz vocalists and flugelhorn players in Japan, he is known for promoting jazz in Japan and bringing elements of the genre into J-pop through collaborations with other artists. He has worked with clammbon, Miki Imai, Maki Oguro, Yuji Ohno, Mariko Takahashi, Ken Hirai, DOUBLE, m-flo, and Exile.

== Early life ==
Toku was born on February 20, 1973, in Niigata Prefecture. Under his father's influence, Toku grew up enjoying all kinds of music. During junior high school Toku began to learn to play the cornet, and in the following years he picked up the trumpet and flugel horn as well. In high school, Toku was in a cover band, playing mainly rock and pop songs, which he continued to be a part of into college. At a campus festival, a jazz drummer heard Toku play Miles Davis' version of If I Were a Bell. He was later invited to a jam session with the drummer where he became inspired to pursue jazz. In his junior year of college, he moved to the United States to learn English at Tokyo International University in Oregon. There, Toku played in a band with his roommate, a jazz pianist.

== Career ==
Upon graduating from college, Toku started singing at the jazz club BODY & SOUL. There, he was scouted by Rob Crocker, a DJ from the Tokyo radio station (INTER-FM), who heard him play Miles Davis' version of If I Were a Bell. This eventually led to him signing with Sony Music Records Inc. He released his first album, "Everything She Said"(produced by Rob Crocker)on January 21, 2000. In August, he played at Blue Note Tokyo, and in November had his first overseas performance in Konkuk University's New Millennium Hall in Seoul, South Korea. The following year, he release his second album, "Bewitching." In 2002, Toku's fame spread through the song "You are so beautiful," which he sang for a Hitachi TV commercial as well as his first single "Do-Re-Mi" for Honda's Odyssey ad campaign. He has released twelve albums and performed all over the world, including at the Jazzy Shanghai Festival, Paris Jazz Festival, Hong Kong International Jazz Festival, and the Jakarta International JAVA JAZZ Festival. In 2011, Toku recorded with American singer songwriter Cyndi Lauper for the Japanese edition of her album Memphis Blues. He also was a musician during the Japanese leg of her Memphis Blues Tour.

=== TKY ===
In 2004, at a summer festival Toku, Kenji Hino, and Yosuke Onuma decided to combine their talents into a single musical group. The idea had originated when the three founding members had gone to New York previously. They performed at Fuji Rock 2004 and afterwards began to work as a quintet, adding keyboardist Shinji Akita and drummer Hidenobu "Kalta" Otsuki. TKY disbanded by the end of 2005.

== Personal life ==
Toku enjoys photography in his free time.

== Discography ==
=== Albums ===
- Everything She Said (2000)
- Bewitching (2001)
- Winds of Change (2002)
- Chemistry of Love (2002)
- Toku (2003)
- 30 (2004)
- A Brand-New Beginning (2006)
- Love Again (2008)
- Toku Sings & Plays Stevie Wonder (A Jazz Tribute from Atlanta) (2011)
- Dream A Dream (2013)
- Dear Mr. Sinatra (2015)
- Shake (2017)

=== Singles ===
- "Do-Re-Mi" (2002)
