= Memphis Blues Tour =

2010–11 concert tour by Cyndi Lauper

- Tour by Cyndi Lauper
- Promotional ad for tour
- Associated album: Memphis Blues
- Start date: June 25, 2010
- End date: November 5, 2011
- Legs: 8
- No. of shows: 74 in North America; 13 in South America; 6 in Asia; 7 in Australia; 27 in Europe; 143 total

Cyndi Lauper concert chronology
- Bring Ya to the Brink Tour (2008); Memphis Blues Tour (2010–11); She's So Unusual: 30th Anniversary Tour (2013)

The Memphis Blues Tour was the eleventh concert tour by American recording artist Cyndi Lauper, in support of her eleventh studio album. The tour visited the Americas, Asia, Australia and Europe. During the trek, Lauper performed at numerous jazz festivals including the New Orleans Jazz & Heritage Festival, Jazz à Vienne and Jazz Fest Wien. In the fall of 2011, Lauper continued the tour as a co-headlining show with Dr. John titled From Memphis to Mardi Gras. Lauper performed over a hundred concerts beginning in June 2010 and ending in November 2011.

== Background ==
Lauper announced the tour in April 2010 via her official website. The singer stated the show will focus heavily on the blues sound of her album alongside her past hits. The tour was designed to be an intimate tour. mimicking the jazz culture of the 1920s. Lauper wanted the show to emulate hearing good music in a "smoky cafe". While on tour, concertgoers were able to donate to charities supported by the singer including the Give a Damn Foundation. Lauper was joined on tour by Charlie Musselwhite and Allen Toussaint, who helped contribute to the making of her recent album. While on tour in Japan, Lauper concerts occurred during the 2011 Tōhoku earthquake. Although the singer was urged to leave the island, Lauper stayed and continued to perform her shows as scheduled. She donated the funds from her shows to help relief efforts. In Argentina, Lauper gave an impromptu performance of her hit "Girls Just Want to Have Fun" at the Aeroparque Jorge Newbery.

== Opening acts ==
- David Rhodes (North America—Leg 1, select dates)
- Charlie Musselwhite (North America—Leg 1, select dates)
- Sharon Jones & The Dap-Kings (Atlanta—August 2010)
- Allen Toussaint (Los Angeles—August 2010)
- The Ferocious Few (North America—Leg 2, select dates)
- Lan Lan (Brazil)
- Casey Donovan (Australia, select dates)
- Rainy Boy Sleep (England, Scotland)
- NEeMA (Istres)

== Setlist ==
North America—Leg 1 & 2
1. "Just Your Fool"
2. "Shattered Dreams"
3. "Early in the Mornin'"
4. "Romance in the Dark"
5. "How Blue Can You Get"
6. "Down Don't Bother Me"
7. "Down So Low"
8. "Cross Road Blues"
9. "Rollin' and Tumblin'"
10. "Don't Cry No More" (contains excerpts from "Shout")
11. "Lead Me On"(Second Leg only)
12. "Who Let In The Rain"
13. "Change of Heart"
14. "Girls Just Want to Have Fun"
15. "Time After Time"
  Encore
16. "True Colors" (contains excerpts from "Power to the People")

Notes

- "She Bop" and "Mother Earth" were performed at select dates during the first and second North American leg.
- "Hound Dog" was performed during the second North American leg.
- During concerts in December, Lauper performed "I Saw Three Ships", "Feels Like Christmas", "Minnie and Santa", "Silent Night" and "In the Bleak Midwinter".
- During the concert at the Mayo Center for the Performing Arts, Lauper performed "I'm Gonna Be Strong", "I Don't Want to Cry", and "Wild Women Don't Have the Blues".
- During the concert at the Keswick Theatre (2010), Lauper performed "Sally's Pigeons" and "Above the Clouds".
- During the concert at the Tropicana Showroom, Lauper performed "Shine".
South America/Asia/Australia
1. "Just Your Fool"
2. "Shattered Dreams"
3. "She Bop"
4. "Early in the Mornin'"
5. "All Through the Night"
6. "Lead Me On"
7. "Cross Road Blues"
8. "Down Don't Bother Me"
9. "Don't Cry No More" (contains excerpts from "Shout")
10. "The Goonies 'R' Good Enough"
11. "Change of Heart"
12. "Girls Just Want to Have Fun"
13. "Time After Time"
14. "Shine"
15. "Mother Earth"
  Encore
16. "True Colors" (contains excerpts from "Power to the People")

Notes

- "Iko Iko" was performed at select dates during the South American leg.
- In Rio, Lauper performed "Sally's Pigeon".
- During the performances in São Paulo, Lauper performed "Fearless".
- In Porto Alegre, Lauper performed "Edge of the Earth". During the same show Lauper performed "Rain on Me"
- In Cuiabá, Lauper performed "Fearless". The song was also included during the performance at the Teatro Gran Rex.
- In Buenos Aires, Lauper performed "Boy Blue".
- In Santiago, Lauper performed "Rain on Me".
- During the concerts at Orchard Hall, Tokyo, Lauper performed "I Don't Want to Cry".
- During the March 21 concert in Osaka, Lauper performed "What's Going On".
- During the March 22 concert in Osaka, Lauper performed "Fearless".
- "How Blue Can You Get" was performed during all Australian concerts.
- During the concerts in Brisbane and Perth, Lauper performed "Sally's Pigeon".
- During the March 31 concert in Sydney, Lauper performed "Rain on Me".
- During the concert in Newcastle, Lauper performed "I'm Gonna Be Strong". The song was also included in the performance at the Palais Theatre.
- During the concert in Melbourne, Lauper performed "Heading West" in lieu of "Shine". During the same show, Lauper included "Who Let In The Rain".
Europe
1. "Just Your Fool"
2. "Shattered Dreams"
3. "She Bop"
4. "Early in the Mornin'"
5. "Cross Road Blues"
6. "All Through the Night"
7. "Down So Low"
8. "Down Don't Bother Me"
9. "Don't Cry No More" (contains excerpts from "Shout")
10. "The Goonies 'R' Good Enough"
11. "Change of Heart"
12. "What's Going On"
13. "Lyfe"
14. "Girls Just Want to Have Fun"
15. "Time After Time" (contains excerpts from "The World Is Stone")
  Encore
16. "True Colors"

Notes

- "Lead Me On" was often performed in lieu of "Down So Low".
- "The Goonies 'R' Good Enough" was not included during the performances at the Harpa Concert Hall, Stora Salongen, and Vognsbølparken.
- "Fearless" was performed in lieu of "The World Is Stone" during concerts at the Harpa Concert Hall, Symphony Hall and the Colston Hall.
- "Don't Cry No More" was included in the performances at L'Olympia and the Kaufleuten.
- During the concert at the Harpa Concert Hall, Lauper performed "Mother Earth".
- During the concert at the Stora Salongen, Lauper performed "How Blue Can You Get". The song was also included during the performances at the Vognsbølparken, Bridgewater Hall, Glasgow Royal Concert Hall and the Sheffield City Hall.
- During the concert at the Stora Salongen, Lauper performed "Sally's Pigeon". The song was also included during the performances at the Kaufleuten, Arena Civica, Laeiszhalle and the Admiralspalast.
- During the concert at Glasgow Royal Concert Hall, Lauper performed "Wild Mountain Thyme" in lieu of "The World Is Stone".
- During the concert at the Brighton Dome Concert Hall, Lauper performed "Kindred Spirit".
- During the concert at the Hammersmith Apollo, Lauper performed "Carey". During the same concert, Lauper performed "Mother Earth".
- During the concert at the Plaça del Mercat, Lauper performed "Down So Low". The song was also included during the performance at the Trinidad Square.
- During the concert at City Hall, Lauper performed "Who Let In The Rain".
North America—Leg 3

From Memphis to Mardi Gras Tour (with Dr. John)

1. "Just Your Fool"
2. "Shattered Dreams"
3. "She Bop"
4. "Crossroads"
5. "All Through the Night"
6. "Lead Me On"
7. "Don't Cry No More"
8. "The Goonies 'R' Good Enough"
9. "Change of Heart"
10. "What's Going On"
11. "Lyfe"
12. "Girls Just Want to Have Fun"
13. "Time After Time"
  Encore
14. "True Colors"

Notes

- "Down So Low" was performed in place of "Lead Me On" on night where Charlie Musslewhite was present
- "Down Don't Bother Me" was performed on a few select dates
- "What's Going On" and "Lyfe" were not always performed due to curfew restrictions
- Beginning in Red Bank, New Jersey, Cyndi performed a duet with Dr. John during his set. These songs varied between "Makin Whoopee", "Wang Dang Doodle" and "Glory Glory Hallelujah!"
- On certain nights, special a cappella songs were performed like "Fearless", "Sallys Pigeons" and "Hat Full of Stars"

== Tour dates ==
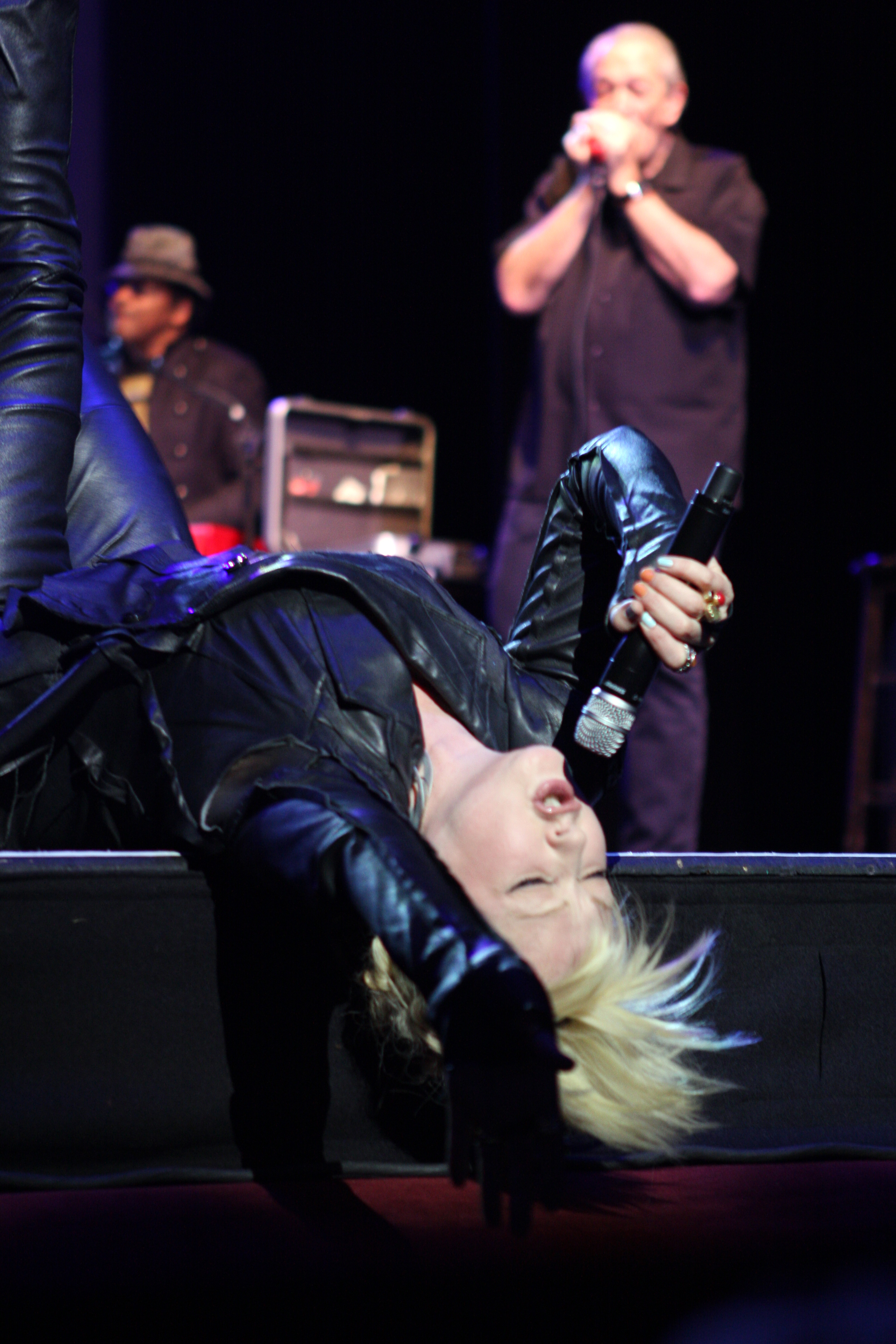
Lauper performing in Australia

Date	City	Country	Venue
North America—Leg 1
June 25, 2010	Morristown	United States	Mayo Center for the Performing Arts
June 26, 2010	Boston	United States	House of Blues
June 27, 2010	Englewood	United States	Bergen Performing Arts Center
June 29, 2010	Cleveland	United States	House of Blues
June 30, 2010	Chicago	United States	House of Blues
July 1, 2010	Detroit	United States	Sound Board Theater
July 3, 2010^{[A]}	Toronto	Canada	Queen's Park
July 4, 2010	Montreal	Canada	Métropolis
July 21, 2010	New York City	United States	The Town Hall
July 23, 2010	Westhampton	United States	Westhampton Beach Performing Arts Center
July 24, 2010	Westhampton	United States	Westhampton Beach Performing Arts Center
July 25, 2010	Northampton	United States	Pines Theater
July 27, 2010	New Bedford	United States	Zeiterion Performing Arts Center
July 28, 2010	Ridgefield	United States	Ridgefield Playhouse
July 30, 2010	Glenside	United States	Keswick Theatre
July 31, 2010	Myrtle Beach	United States	House of Blues
August 1, 2010	Orlando	United States	House of Blues
August 3, 2010	Miami	United States	Knight Concert Hall
August 4, 2010	Clearwater	United States	Ruth Eckerd Hall
August 6, 2010	Atlanta	United States	Chastain Park Amphitheater
August 7, 2010	Biloxi	United States	Beau Rivage Theatre
August 8, 2010	New Orleans	United States	House of Blues
August 10, 2010	Austin	United States	Paramount Theatre
August 11, 2010	Dallas	United States	House of Blues
August 12, 2010	Houston	United States	House of Blues
August 14, 2010	Albuquerque	United States	Legends Theater
August 15, 2010	Tucson	United States	AVA Amphitheater
August 17, 2010	Saratoga	United States	Mountain Winery Amphitheater
August 18, 2010	Napa	United States	Uptown Theatre
August 20, 2010	West Wendover	United States	Peppermill Concert Hall
August 21, 2010	Las Vegas	United States	House of Blues
August 22, 2010	San Diego	United States	House of Blues
August 26, 2010	Santa Ynez	United States	Samala Showroom
August 27, 2010	Los Angeles	United States	Greek Theatre
August 28, 2010	Reno	United States	Grande Exposition Hall
September 1, 2010^{[B]}	Portland	United States	Oregon Zoo Amphitheater
September 2, 2010^{[C]}	Seattle	United States	North Meadow
September 3, 2010^{[D]}	Vancouver	Canada	PNE Rogers Amphitheatre
September 23, 2010	Denver	United States	Paramount Theatre
North America—Leg 2
November 27, 2010	Washington, D.C.	United States	9:30 Club
November 28, 2010	Asheville	United States	The Orange Peel
December 2, 2010	Memphis	United States	The Warehouse
December 4, 2010	Newkirk	United States	Council Bluff Event Center
December 5, 2010	Concho	United States	Lucky Star Casino Events Center
December 7, 2010	Milwaukee	United States	Northern Lights Theater
December 8, 2010	Milwaukee	United States	Northern Lights Theater
December 10, 2010	Atlantic City	United States	Tropicana Showroom
December 11, 2010	Ledyard	United States	MGM Grand Theater
December 12, 2010	Waterbury	United States	Palace Theatre
December 14, 2010	Kingston	United States	Ulster Performing Arts Center
December 15, 2010	Tarrytown	United States	Tarrytown Music Hall
December 18, 2010	San Francisco	United States	The Independent
South America
February 19, 2011	Recife	Brazil	Chevrolet Hall
February 20, 2011	Rio de Janeiro	Brazil	Vivo Rio
February 22, 2011	São Paulo	Brazil	Via Funchal
February 23, 2011	São Paulo	Brazil	Via Funchal
February 25, 2011	Goiânia	Brazil	Atlanta Music Hall
February 26, 2011	Cuiabá	Brazil	Pavilhão das Nações
February 27, 2011	Brasília	Brazil	Centro de Eventos e Convenções Brasil 21
March 1, 2011	Porto Alegre	Brazil	Teatro do Bourbon Country
March 3, 2011	Buenos Aires	Argentina	Teatro Gran Rex
March 5, 2011	Santiago	Chile	Teatro Caupolicán
March 6, 2011	Viña del Mar	Chile	Gran Ballroom
March 8, 2011	Caracas	Venezuela	Anfiteatro del Sambil
March 10, 2011	Panama City	Panama	Teatro Anayansi
Asia
March 15, 2011	Nagoya	Japan	CU Center for Culture & Arts
March 16, 2011	Tokyo	Japan	Orchard Hall
March 17, 2011	Tokyo	Japan	Orchard Hall
March 18, 2011	Tokyo	Japan	Orchard Hall
March 21, 2011	Osaka	Japan	NHK Osaka Hall
March 22, 2011	Osaka	Japan	NHK Osaka Hall
Australia
March 28, 2011	Brisbane	Australia	QPAC Concert Hall
March 29, 2011	Brisbane	Australia	QPAC Concert Hall
March 31, 2011	Sydney	Australia	State Theatre
April 1, 2011	Sydney	Australia	State Theatre
April 2, 2011	Newcastle	Australia	Newcastle Entertainment Centre
April 5, 2011	Perth	Australia	Burswood Theatre
April 8, 2011	Melbourne	Australia	Palais Theatre
North America
May 5, 2011^{[E]}	New Orleans	United States	Fair Grounds Race Course
Europe
June 12, 2011	Reykjavík	Iceland	Harpa Concert Hall
June 14, 2011	Bergen	Norway	Ricks Teater
June 16, 2011	Stockholm	Sweden	Stora Salongen
June 18, 2011^{[F]}	Esbjerg	Denmark	Vognsbølparken
June 20, 2011	Manchester	England	Bridgewater Hall
June 23, 2011	Glasgow	Scotland	Glasgow Royal Concert Hall
June 24, 2011	Sheffield	England	Sheffield City Hall
June 26, 2011	Birmingham	England	Symphony Hall, Birmingham
June 27, 2011	Bristol	England	Colston Hall
June 28, 2011	Brighton	England	Brighton Dome Concert Hall
June 30, 2011	London	England	Hammersmith Apollo
July 1, 2011^{[G]}	Oxfordshire	England	Great Tew Estate
July 3, 2011	Paris	France	L'Olympia
July 5, 2011	Zürich	Switzerland	Kaufleuten
July 5, 2011	Basel	Switzerland	The Flower
July 8, 2011^{[H]}	Vienne	France	Vienne Roman Theater
July 9, 2011	Esch-sur-Alzette	Luxembourg	Rockhal
July 11, 2011	Rome	Italy	Auditorium Parco della Musica
July 12, 2011^{[I]}	Istres	France	Pavillon de Grignan
July 13, 2011^{[J]}	Milan	Italy	Arena Civica
July 15, 2011^{[K]}	Vienna	Austria	Vienna State Opera
July 18, 2011	Hamburg	Germany	Laeiszhalle
July 19, 2011	Berlin	Germany	Admiralspalast
July 22, 2011^{[L]}	Cartagena	Spain	Auditorio Parque Torres
July 23, 2011^{[M]}	Sant Feliu de Guíxols	Spain	Espai Port Marítim
July 24, 2011^{[N]}	Madrid	Spain	Escenario Puerta del Ángel
July 25, 2011^{[O]}	San Sebastián	Spain	Trinidad Square
North America—Leg 3
October 7, 2011	Lake Buena Vista	United States	House of Blues
October 8, 2011	Biloxi	United States	Beau Rivage Theatre
October 9, 2011	Birmingham	United States	Jemison Concert Hall
October 11, 2011	Greenville	United States	Peace Concert Hall
October 12, 2011	Atlanta	United States	Williams Theatre
October 14, 2011	Montclair	United States	Wellmont Theater
October 15, 2011	Englewood	United States	Bergen Performing Arts Center
October 16, 2011	Red Bank	United States	Count Basie Theatre
October 18, 2011	Washington, D.C.	United States	9:30 Club
October 19, 2011	Westbury	United States	NYCB Theatre at Westbury
October 21, 2011	Glenside	United States	Keswick Theatre
October 22, 2011	Reading	United States	Sovereign Performing Arts Center
October 23, 2011	Boston	United States	House of Blues
October 25, 2011	Buffalo	United States	Kleinhans Music Hall
October 27, 2011	Carmel	United States	The Palladium
October 28, 2011	Aurora	United States	Paramount Theatre
October 29, 2011	Cincinnati	United States	Taft Theatre
October 31, 2011	Kansas City	United States	The Midland by AMC
November 1, 2011	Denver	United States	Ogden Theatre
November 3, 2011	Pala	United States	Infinity Showroom
November 4, 2011	Los Angeles	United States	Club Nokia
November 5, 2011	Reno	United States	Grande Exposition Hall
Asia
March 7, 2012	Niigata	Japan	Niigata Prefectural Civic Center
March 9, 2012	Tokyo	Japan	Orchard Hall
March 10, 2012	Tokyo	Japan	Orchard Hall
March 11, 2012	Tokyo	Japan	Orchard Hall
March 13, 2012	Osaka	Japan	Osaka International Convention Center
March 15, 2012	Nagoya	Japan	Aichi Arts Center Hall
March 17, 2012	Quezon City	Philippines	Smart Araneta Coliseum

Festivals and other miscellaneous performances

^{A} This concert was a part of "Pride Toronto"
^{B} This concert was a part of the "Oregon Zoo Summer Concerts"
^{C} This concert was a part of the "BECU ZooTunes"
^{D} This concert was a part of "The Fair at PNE Summer Night Concerts"
^{E} This concert was a part of the "New Orleans Jazz & Heritage Festival"
^{F} This concert was a part of the "Esbjerg Rock Festival"
^{G} This concert was a part of the "Cornbury Festival"
^{H} This concert was a part of "Jazz à Vienne"

^{I} This concert was a part of "Les Nuits d'Istres Festival"
^{J} This concert was a part of the "Milano Jazzin' Festival"
^{K} This concert was a part of "Jazz Fest Wien"
^{L} This concert was a part of "La Mar de Músicas de Cartagena"
^{M} This concert was a part of the "Festival de la Porta Ferrada Sant Feliu de Guíxols"
^{N} This concert was a part of the "Festival Veranos de la Villa"
^{O} This concert was a part of the "Heineken Jazzaldia"

Cancellations and rescheduled shows

February 19, 2011	Belo Horizonte, Brazil	Chevrolet Hall	Cancelled
February 20, 2011	São Paulo, Brazil	Via Funchal	Rescheduled to February 22, 2011
February 21, 2011	São Paulo, Brazil	Via Funchal	Rescheduled to February 23, 2011
February 23, 2011	Recife, Brazil	Chevrolet Hall	Rescheduled to February 19, 2011
February 25, 2011	Rio de Janeiro, Brazil	Citibank Hall	Rescheduled to February 20, 2011 and moved to Vivo Rio
February 26, 2011	Florianópolis, Brazil	Floripa Music Hall	Cancelled
February 27, 2011	Porto Alegre, Brazil	Teatro do Bourbon Country	Rescheduled to March 1, 2011
March 2, 2011	Buenos Aires, Argentina	Teatro Gran Rex	Rescheduled to March 3, 2011
March 3, 2011	Santiago, Chile	Gran Ballroom	Rescheduled to March 5, 2011
March 5, 2011	Lima, Peru	Jockey Club del Perú	Cancelled

=== Box office score data ===
Venue	City	Tickets sold / available	Gross revenue
Sound Board Theater	Detroit	1,189 / 1,560 (76%)	$57,412
Keswick Theatre	Glenside	1,282 / 1,282 (100%)	$65,979
Knight Concert Hall	Miami	1,369 / 1,800 (76%)	$70,376
Ruth Eckerd Hall	Clearwater	1,423 / 2,180 (65%)	$67,480
Greek Theatre	Los Angeles	3,563 / 3,701 (96%)	$151,250
9:30 Club	Washington, D.C.	901 / 1,200 (75%)	$40,545
Newcastle Entertainment Centre	Newcastle	1,600 / 2,975 (54%)	$181,586
Bridgewater Hall	Manchester	1,247 / 1,450 (86%)	$57,263
Glasgow Royal Concert Hall	Glasgow	1,050 / 1,420 (74%)	$46,733
Sheffield City Hall	Sheffield	1,011 / 1,510 (67%)	$48,359
Symphony Hall	Birmingham	1,277 / 1,350 (94%)	$62,231
Colston Hall	Bristol	936 / 1,324 (71%)	$42,459
Brighton Dome Concert Hall	Brighton	958 / 1,422 (67%)	$45,407
Hammersmith Apollo	London	2,082 / 2,500 (83%)	$105,304
Williams Theatre	Atlanta	803 / 2,451 (33%)	$45,617
9:30 Club	Washington, D.C.	631 / 1,200 (52%)	$28,395
Sovereign Performing Arts Center	Reading	707 / 1,774 (40%)	$37,011
Club Nokia	Los Angeles	1,343 / 1,500 (89%)	$60,559
TOTAL		23,372 / 32,599 (72%)	$1,213,966

== Broadcasts and recordings ==
Lauper's performance during Jazz á Vienne was broadcast on live on French radio station France Inter. The show omitted "All Through the Night", with "Cross Road Blues" and "Down So Low" not broadcast in full.

A DVD/ CD of her performance on December 2, 2010 at The Warehouse in Memphis, Tennessee was released in October 2011 and was titled "Cyndi Lauper To Memphis, with Love." It was a unique film with documentary footage but included the performances of the entire set list of the show that night. The package includes a booklet that looked like a concert program with photos from the Memphis show in particular but also photos of Cyndi and her band in various places on the Memphis Blues tour.

== Critical reception ==
The tour was praised by music critics and concertgoers. Katherine Feeny (Brisbane Times) gave the pop singer's concert at the QPAC Concert Hall four out of five stars. She says, "It's just one of example of her ability to endear herself to the room, an ability testament to her skill and experience. So too is Lauper's lack of need for showy stage and lighting. The sheer scale and gutsy thrust of her vocal range coupled with a dynamic presence more than fills the stage". Michael Dwyer (The Sydney Morning Herald) gave the singer three and a half out of five stars. He writes, "Maybe the subtleties between thought and expression are redundant when a Broadway dynamo in a leather pantsuit is prowling the theatre, standing on chairs and bellowing that 'Girls Just Wanna Have Fun'. But when she hit the right blend of power and soul—such as with Robert Johnson's Cross Roads Blues—Lauper channelled something more profound".

The praise for the tour continued as Lauper began to perform in England. Kate Watkins (City Life) gave the performance at the Bridgewater Hall four out of five stars. She explains, "The night ended with a sombre performance of 'True Colors' which showcased the depth and feeling of her vocals which have only improved since she started singing the Blues". Catherine Meek (The Argus) gave the concert at the Brighton Dome Concert Hall a positive review. She states, "Whether she was singing a track from her most recent album, 'Memphis Blues', with full backing, or a solo of an old favourite with nothing but the microphone and her dulcimer, Lauper's voice bellowed harmony".

== Personnel ==
Band

- Orris Warner – drums
- Michael Toles – guitar
- William Wittman – bass guitar
- Archie Turner – keyboards
- Stephen Gaboury, Sr. – piano
- Kay Hanley, Tara Stone – backing vocals
