= Hate to See You Go =

Song by Little Walter

"I Hate to See You Go"

Single by Little Walter
- A-side: "Too Late"
- Released: September 1955
- Recorded: April 28, 1955 (Note: August 12, 1955, has also been given as the recording date.)
- Studio: Universal, Chicago
- Genre: Blues
- Length: 2:16
- Label: Checker
- Songwriter: Walter Jacobs a.k.a. Little Walter (credited)

Little Walter singles chronology
| "Roller Coaster" (1955) | "I Hate to See You Go" (1955) | "Who" (1956) |

"Hate to See You Go" (or "I Hate to See You Go") is a blues song written and recorded by Chicago blues artist Little Walter. In 1955, Checker Records released it as one of three singles by Walter that year. The song, a one chord modal blues, is a reworking of "You Don't Love Me", written by Bo Diddley and recorded one month prior.

In 2016, the Rolling Stones recorded the song, which was released as the second single from their covers album, Blue & Lonesome.

== Composition and recording ==
During his first session for Leonard Chess' Checker Records on March 2–3, 1955, Bo Diddley recorded "You Don't Love Me" (often subtitled "You Don't Care"). Unlike his self-titled debut song recorded at the same session, which introduced the signature beat, "You Don't Love Me" uses a conventional beat. Also, it does not follow the typical I–IV–V blues chord progression, but remains on one chord throughout.

Little Walter liked the "driving groove and Bo's distinctive guitar sound" and decided to record the number with his own lyrics:

Gone and left me, left me here to cry
Know I love her, she's my desire ...
Come on back baby, don't do me wrong
You know I love you, please come back home
Come on back home (3x)

The title line "hate to see you go" does not appear in the song. Bo Diddley agreed to record the song with Walter and provided the same "descending guitar 'hook' line" from his earlier recording. The April 28, 1955, recording session at Universal Studios in Chicago also included Luther Tucker on guitar, Willie Dixon on bass, and Fred Below on drums. According to his biographers, "In Walter's hands, the tune is a stomping rocker, with his harp [harmonica] just at the edge of feeding back, and the band pounding out the rhythm."

== Releases ==
Checker chose not to release Bo Diddley's earlier "You Don't Love Me", but instead issued "Hate to See You Go", as the follow-up to Little Walter's "Roller Coaster", which had reached No. 6 on Billboard magazine's R&B Juke Box chart. Released on a single in both 45 rpm 7-inch and 78 rpm 10-inch single formats, it included the Dixon composition "Too Late" as the second side. Neither song, however, appeared on the charts.

In 1959, Bo Diddley's song was included on his second album, Go Bo Diddley and in 1967, he, along with Muddy Waters and Little Walter, recorded a version for the Super Blues album. In 1969, "Hate to See You Go" became the title track for the Chess Little Walter anthology Hate to See You Go.

== The Rolling Stones version ==
"Hate to See You Go"

Single by the Rolling Stones

from the album Blue & Lonesome
- Released: 21 October 2016
- Studio: British Grove, London
- Genre: Blues rock
- Length: 3:22
- Label: Polydor
- Songwriter: Walter Jacobs a.k.a. Little Walter (credited)
- Producers: Don Was; The Glimmer Twins

The Rolling Stones singles chronology
| "Just Your Fool" (2016) | "Hate to See You Go" (2016) | "Ride 'Em on Down" (2016) |

On 8 November 2016, the Rolling Stones released a video for their version of "Hate to See You Go". The album itself was a return to the band's blues roots, and co-producer Don Was said it was a manifest testament to the purity of the Stones' love for making music.

The Rolling Stones' version of "Hate to See You Go" is a harmonica-driven call-and-response between a cyclical riff and a four-chord rhythm sequence. The track was included on the 2019 compilation album Honk.

=== Personnel ===
Personnel per liner notes.

The Rolling Stones

- Mick Jagger - vocals, harmonica
- Keith Richards - guitar
- Ronnie Wood - guitar
- Charlie Watts - drums

Additional musicians

- Darryl Jones - bass guitar
- Matt Clifford - electronic keyboards, Hammond B3

=== Charts ===
The single reached No. 78 in the UK, No. 181 in France, and No. 1 on the Billboard Digital Blues Song Sales chart.
