= Charles Pitts =

American soul and blues guitarist

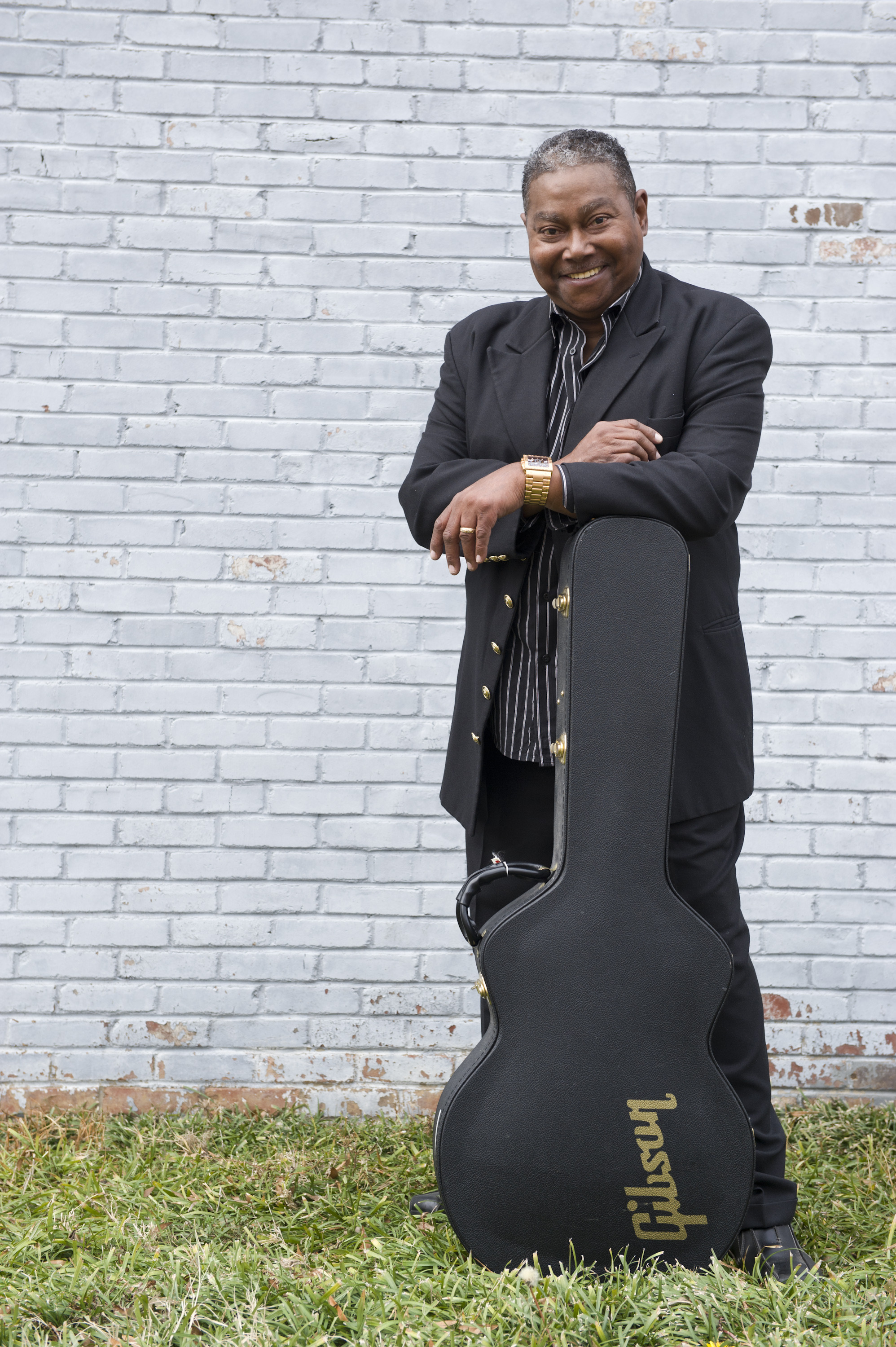
- Pitts in 2011

Background information
- Also known as: Skip Pitts
- Born: April 7, 1947; Washington, D.C., U.S.
- Died: May 1, 2012 (aged 65) Memphis, Tennessee, U.S.
- Genres: Soul; R&B; funk; blues
- Occupation: Musician
- Instrument: Guitar
- Years active: 1964–2012
- Labels: Stax

Charles "Skip" Pitts (April 7, 1947 – May 1, 2012) was an American soul and blues guitarist. He is best known for his distinctive "wah-wah" style, prominently featured on Isaac Hayes' title track from the 1971 movie Shaft. He is widely considered to have been one of the architects of soul, R&B and funk guitar.

== Early career ==
Pitts learned to play guitar at age 11 on the street corners of his childhood hometown, Washington D.C., often receiving tips from his neighbor, Bo Diddley. Pitts' uncle owned a hotel next to the Howard Theater, where he was introduced to soul and R&B musicians such as James Brown and Otis Redding.

At the age of 17, Pitts performed on Gene Chandler's "Rainbow '65," which would become his first appearance on many hit recordings. Pitts soon became the guitarist and bandleader for Wilson Pickett's Midnight Movers, backing Pickett and Sam & Dave.

In 1969, Pitts joined The Isley Brothers band, for whom he created the signature riff for their chart-topping hit "It's Your Thing."

== With Isaac Hayes (1971-2008) ==
In 1970, Pitts moved to Memphis, Tennessee, to join Isaac Hayes' band. A year later, Pitts created the wah-wah guitar intro for "Theme From Shaft", a song which earned Hayes an Academy Award.

Pitts went on to work with Hayes over the next three decades, appearing on many of Hayes' hit albums and soundtracks. He can be seen onstage performing with Hayes in the documentary Wattstax (1973) and in the blaxploitation film Truck Turner (1974). In the 1990s and 2000s, Pitts collaborated with Hayes on the John Singleton remake of Shaft as well as the soundtrack for the animated series South Park, for which he received a gold record.

Pitts remained the band's guitarist and bandleader until Hayes' death in August 2008.

== Stax Records ==
When not working with Hayes, Pitts served as a session musician at Stax Records. His performances included hits by Rufus Thomas ("The Breakdown"), The Temprees ("This is Dedicated to the One I Love"), The Soul Children, and Albert King.

More recently, Pitts' guitar playing was introduced to a new generation, when the hip-hop community began sampling classic Stax recordings. His guitar riffs have been sampled by Dr. Dre with Snoop Dogg, Beastie Boys, Massive Attack, Eazy-E, and DJ Shadow with Cut Chemist.

== The Bo-Keys ==
In 1998, Pitts became a founding member of The Bo-Keys, a soul/jazz group formed by producer Scott Bomar as an homage to Memphis' rich musical tradition. He appeared with the band at venues and festivals nationally and internationally, including The Ponderosa Stomp, London's Barbican Performing Arts Centre, and Lincoln Center's Midsummer Nights Swing Series. He is prominently featured on The Bo-Keys 2011 release, Got to Get Back! The album led to a feature in the July 2011 issue of Guitar Player Magazine.

== Elmo and The Shades ==
Pitts was associated with the eclectic Memphis blues and soul band Elmo and the Shades from the early 1990s, and occasionally appeared as a duo with Elmo Lee Thomas called The Skip and Elmo Show. He performed on the band's 2009 album Blue Memphis.

== Other notable recordings ==
Pitts appeared on Al Green's Grammy nominated record I Can't Stop, produced by Willie Mitchell, as well as Cyndi Lauper's Grammy nominated Memphis Blues. He performed singles from the album with Lauper on the television shows The Apprentice and Late Night with David Letterman.

== Film work ==
In addition to Wattstax and Truck Turner, Pitts appeared in the award-winning Forty Shades of Blue, Craig Brewer's Black Snake Moan, and Soul Men featuring Bernie Mac and Samuel L. Jackson, for which he also contributed three songs to its soundtrack. The song "Soul Music" by Anthony Hamilton was nominated for a Grammy. Further, he performed on the score for the Academy Award winning film Hustle and Flow with The Bo-Keys.

Due to his association with the wah-wah pedal, Pitts was interviewed for the documentary Cry Baby: The Pedal That Rocks the World alongside Slash, Buddy Guy, Eddie Van Halen, and Kirk Hammett.

== Awards and outreach ==
Pitts taught at-risk youth at Memphis' Stax Music Academy in the early 2000s.

He was the voice of the Memphis Police Department's "Blue Crush" advertisement campaign, an effort to reduce street crime in the city.

In 2011, Pitts received a brass note on the Beale Street Walk of Fame.

== Death ==
Pitts died of cancer in Memphis, Tennessee, on May 1, 2012. He was 65 years old.
