= Stax Museum of American Soul Music =

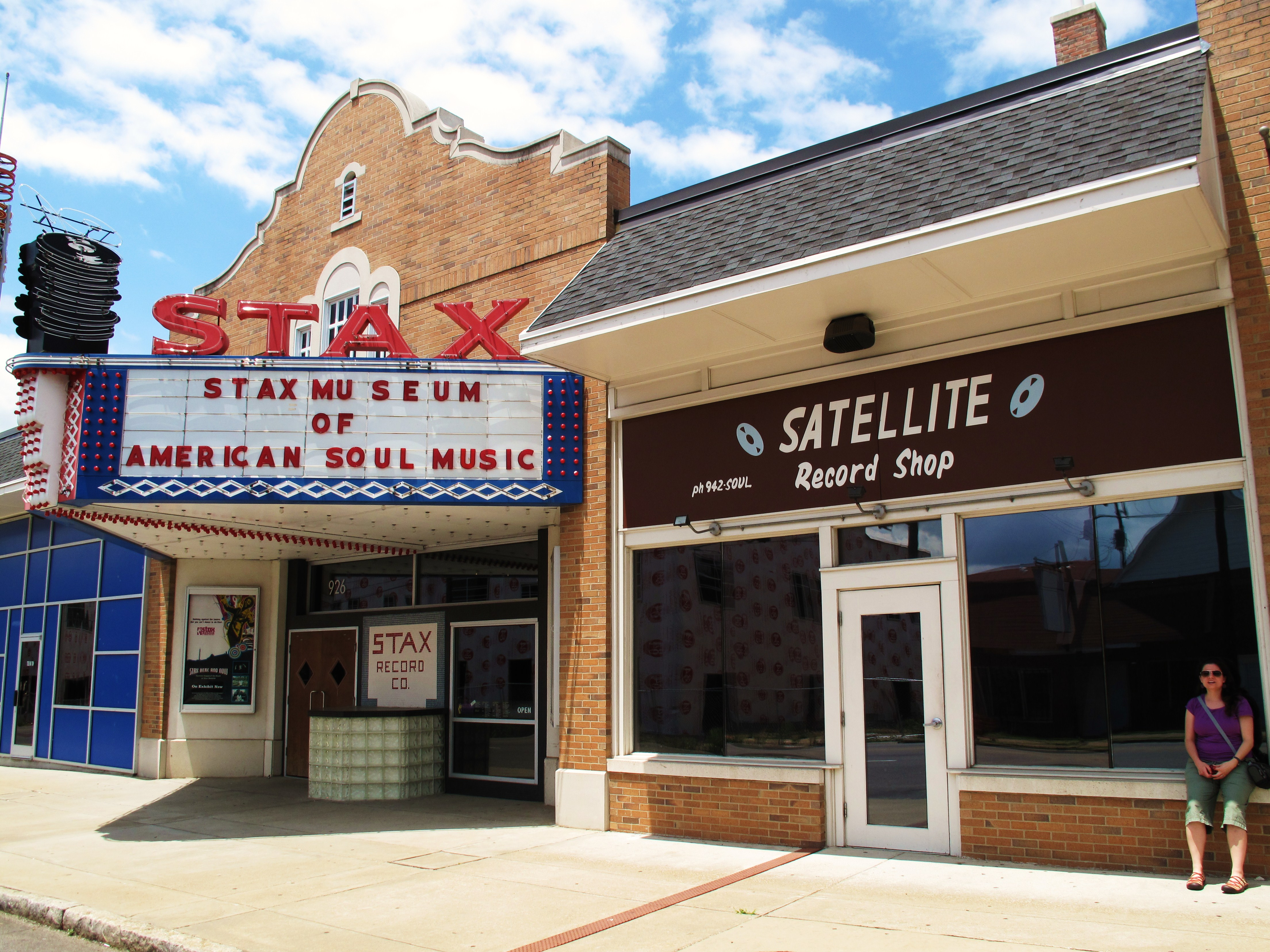
- Museum front entrance
- Established: May 2003
- Location: 926 East McLemore Avenue; Memphis, Tennessee; United States
- Coordinates: 35.115976°N 90.031456°W
- Type: Soul music museum
- Executive director: Jeff Kollath
- Public transit access: MATA
- Website: www.staxmuseum.com

The Stax Museum of American Soul Music is a museum located in Memphis, Tennessee, at 926 East McLemore Avenue, the original location of Stax Records. Stax launched and supported the careers of artists such as Otis Redding, Isaac Hayes, the Staple Singers, Sam & Dave, Booker T. & the M.G.'s, Rufus Thomas, Carla Thomas, Wilson Pickett, Albert King, William Bell, Eddie Floyd, Jean Knight, Mable John, and countless others including spoken word and comedy by Rev. Jesse Jackson, Moms Mabley, and Richard Pryor.

The Stax Museum opened on May 2, 2003, and celebrated its 20th anniversary throughout 2023.

The Stax Museum is operated by the nonprofit Soulsville Foundation, which also operates the adjacent Stax Music Academy and The Soulsville Charter School; the three distinct but related entities are all located on one campus in the heart of the neighborhood known as Soulsville U.S.A.

The Soulsville Foundation announced in August 2022 that its new president and CEO is Pat Mitchell Worley, former Stax Music Academy Executive Director and longtime cohost of the internationally syndicated blues radio show, Beale Street Caravan. Jeff Kollath is the Stax Museum's executive director.

== History ==
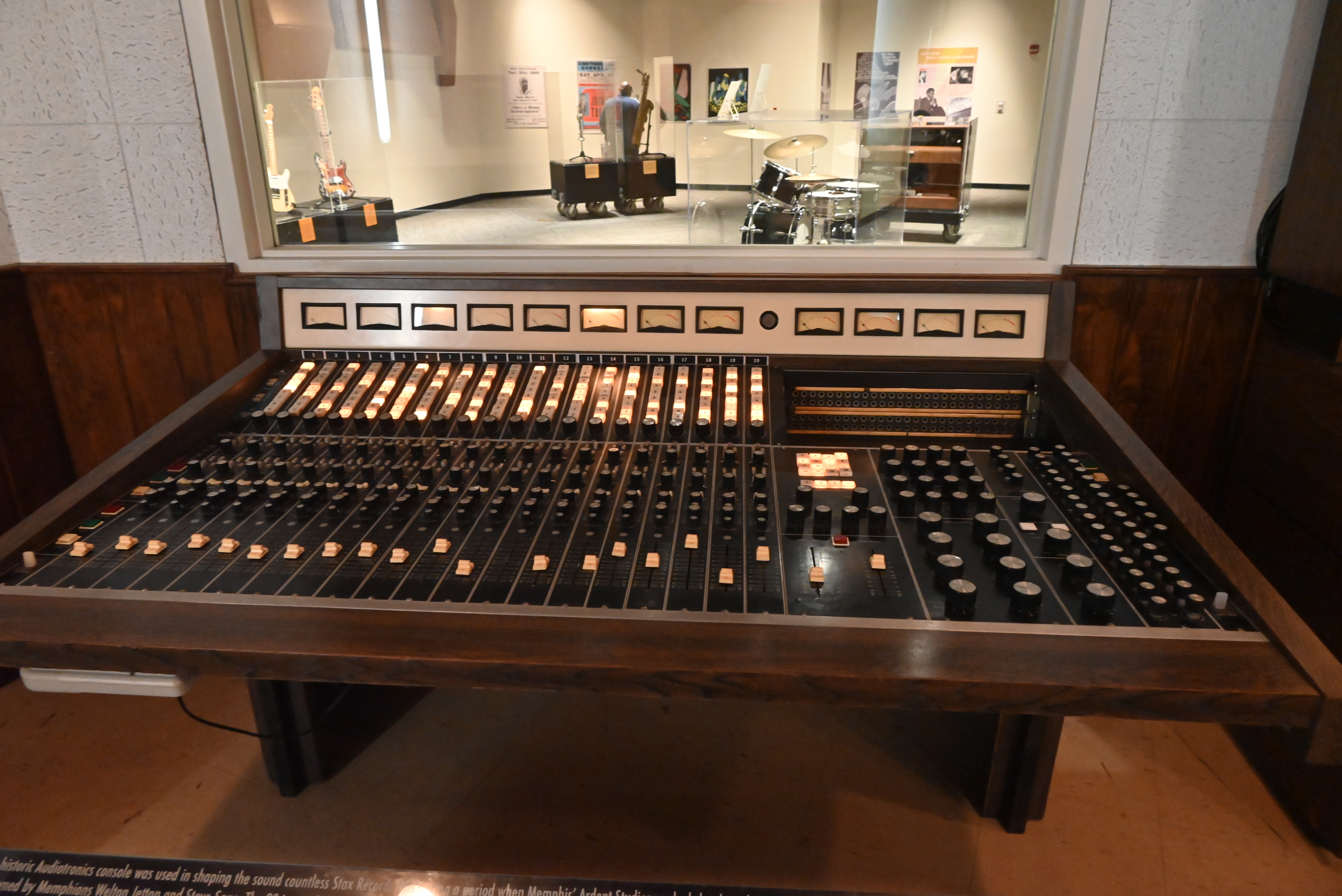
View of the studio from the mixing console

After Stax Records was forced into involuntary bankruptcy and closed in 1976, the Stax studio was sold by the Union Planters Bank for $10.00 to Southside Church of God in Christ, located nearby on McLemore Avenue. The church had plans to use the building as a community center and soup kitchen, which never materialized. As time went by, it was allowed to deteriorate and, despite many attempts to save the original structure, it was demolished in 1989. By 1998, the neighborhood had also fallen into a state of blight, and a group of concerned Memphis business people, anonymous philanthropists, and former Stax Records artists spearheaded a nonprofit revitalization effort for the area, which included a museum that would be a shrine to Stax Records and all American soul music, as well as a music school for urban youth.

Construction began on the Stax Museum and adjacent Stax Music Academy in April 2001. The Stax Music Academy, which had started programming at a nearby elementary school on June 1, 2000, opened in 2002 and the museum opened May 3, 2003. The Stax Museum is a replica of the Stax recording studio, the former Capitol Theatre, down to the sloping floor of studio A. It is a 17,000-square-foot (1,600 m^{2}) museum with permanent and changing interactive exhibits, videos, films, photographs, original instruments used to record Stax hits, stage costumes, vintage recording gear, and more than 3,000 other items of memorabilia including personal items that belonged to Stax Records stars. Some of the standout exhibits include an authentic circa-1906 Mississippi Delta church from Mississippi, reconstructed in the museum to help show the gospel roots of soul music; the Soul Train dance floor, Isaac Hayes' restored custom-built 1972 gold-trimmed, peacock-blue Cadillac Eldorado; and a near-exact recreation of the original Stax Records recording Studio A.

Newer additions include Stax Records founder Jim Stewart's original violin he played in various bands around town before starting Stax Records, Skip Pitts' guitar and the wah-wah pedal used while recording Isaac Hayes' "Theme From Shaft", Floyd Newman's saxophone that turned 100 years old in 2017, and the Academy Award statue Hayes won for Best Musical Score for "Theme From Shaft" in 1972.

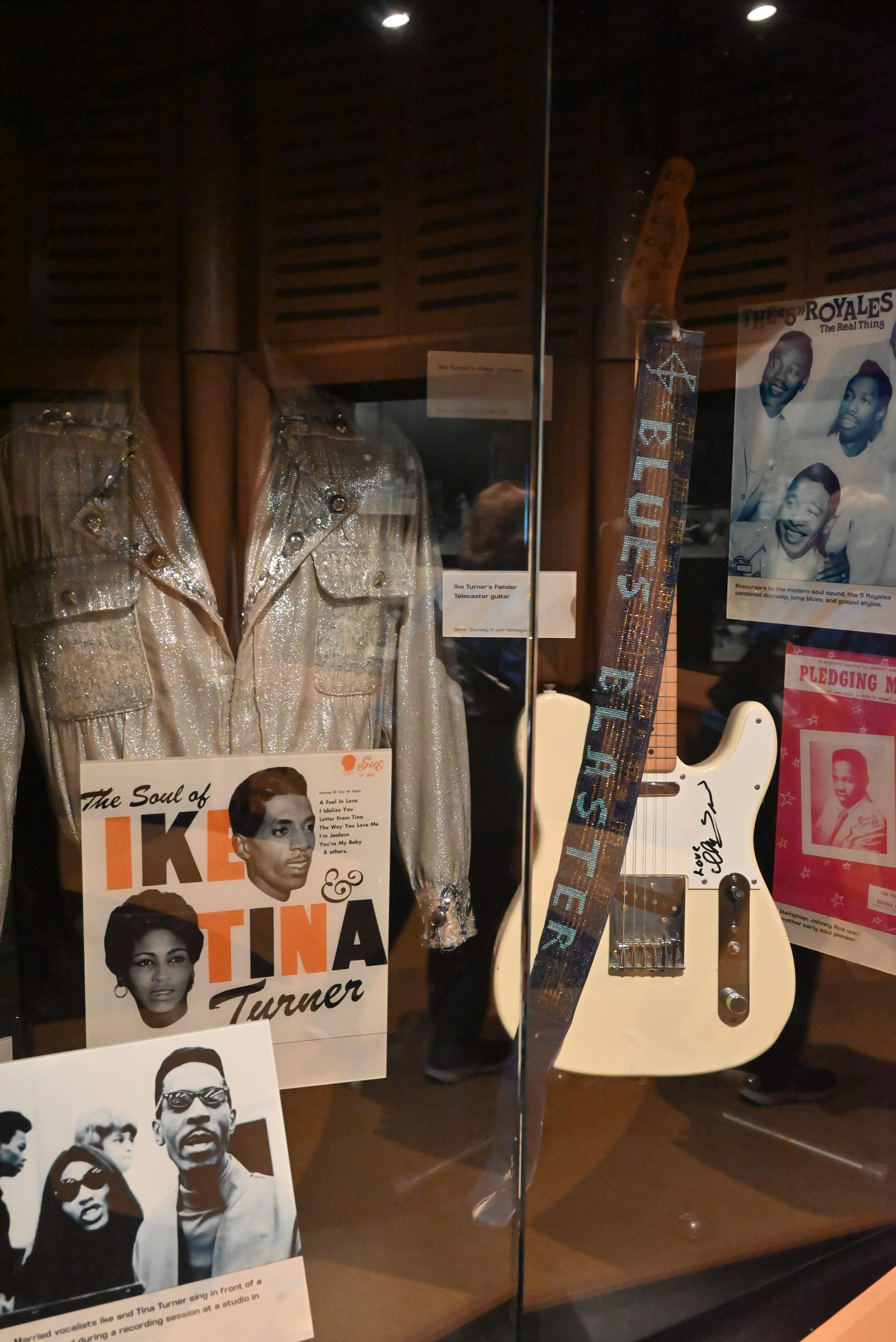
Ike & Tina Turner memorabilia

Because the Stax Museum is one of only a handful of museums in the world dedicated to soul music (the Motown Museum in Detroit is another), it not only celebrates the legacy of Stax Records and its artists such as Isaac Hayes, Otis Redding, Sam & Dave, the Staple Singers, Johnnie Taylor, Albert King, Booker T. & the MGs, Rufus and Carla Thomas and others, but also features other soul music labels such as Motown, Hi Records, Atlantic Records, and Muscle Shoals. Visitors are treated to vintage video footage of non-Stax artists such as Aretha Franklin, Al Green, Stevie Wonder, Marvin Gaye, Ann Peebles, The Jackson Five, Patti LaBelle, Parliament-Funkadelic, Sam Cooke, James Brown, Ike & Tina Turner, and others.

In addition to being a world-class tourist destination that helps fuel the Memphis tourism economy, the Stax Museum is a community-focused organization that offers free programming throughout the year to residents of the Soulsville U.S.A. neighborhood and the general public. Events include concerts, listening parties, book and author events, film screenings, exhibit opening receptions, panel discussions, lectures, and free-admission Family Days designed for children. One such event was on August 2, 2022, to celebrate the Stax Museum's February 2022 inclusion into the United States Civil Rights Trail.

In addition to many other accolades, TIME magazine named the Stax Museum "The Most Authentic American Experience in Tennessee" and the museum was the recipient of the 2015 Tennessee Governor's Arts Award, the highest honor in the arts in the state. It has also been routinely named by USA Today as one of the best music attractions in North America.

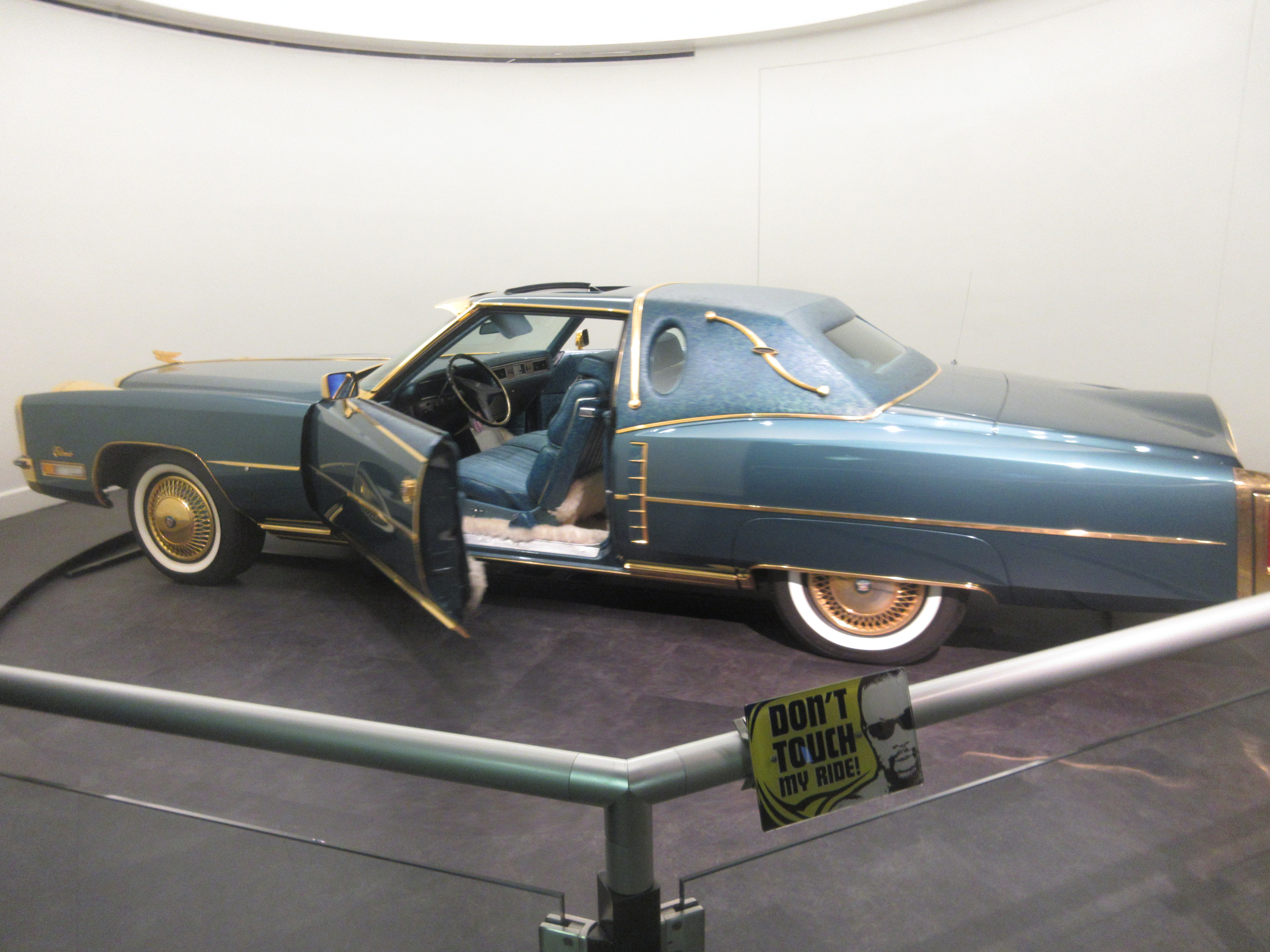
Custom Cadillac El Dorado built for Isaac Hayes

The adjacent Stax Music Academy is a Stax Museum-supported facility where middle and high school students are taught and mentored through music education, unique performance opportunities. creative youth development programming, travel, college preparedness training, and other opportunities. Since 2008, all seniors enrolled in the Stax Music Academy have been accepted to college and since 2021 all seniors have received music scholarships to college. In 2019, Justin Timberlake and the Levi's Music Project visited the academy for several days and installed a permanent songwriting lab, which has led to the students creating more original music and studying music business.

The Soulsville Foundation also operates The Soulsville Charter School, an academically rigorous, musically rich college prep school where students study math, language arts, science, social studies, and other academic subjects of a classical education, along with strings orchestra, band, and choir. Their Soulsville Symphony Orchestra has played for the likes of Stevie Wonder, John Legend, and Isaac Hayes. Since it began having graduating classes in 2012, every senior enrolled in the school has been accepted to college or another post-secondary educational path.

== See also ==
- List of museums in Tennessee
- List of music museums
- Memphis soul
- Stax Records
