= Blue and Lonesome (Little Walter song) =

Single by Little Walter
- A-side: "Mean Ole Frisco"
- Released: 1965
- Recorded: August 12, 1959
- Genre: Rhythm and blues
- Length: 2:53
- Label: Checker
- Songwriter: Little Walter

Little Walter singles chronology
"I'm a Business Man" (1964)	"Blue and Lonesome" (1965)

"Blue and Lonesome" is a blues song recorded in 1959 by Little Walter. It was released as the B-side of the "Mean Ole Frisco" single in 1965 on Checker Records.

In 2016, the Rolling Stones released an album of cover songs titled Blue & Lonesome, on which a cover of the song appears.
