= Scott Bomar =

American musician, producer, and film composer

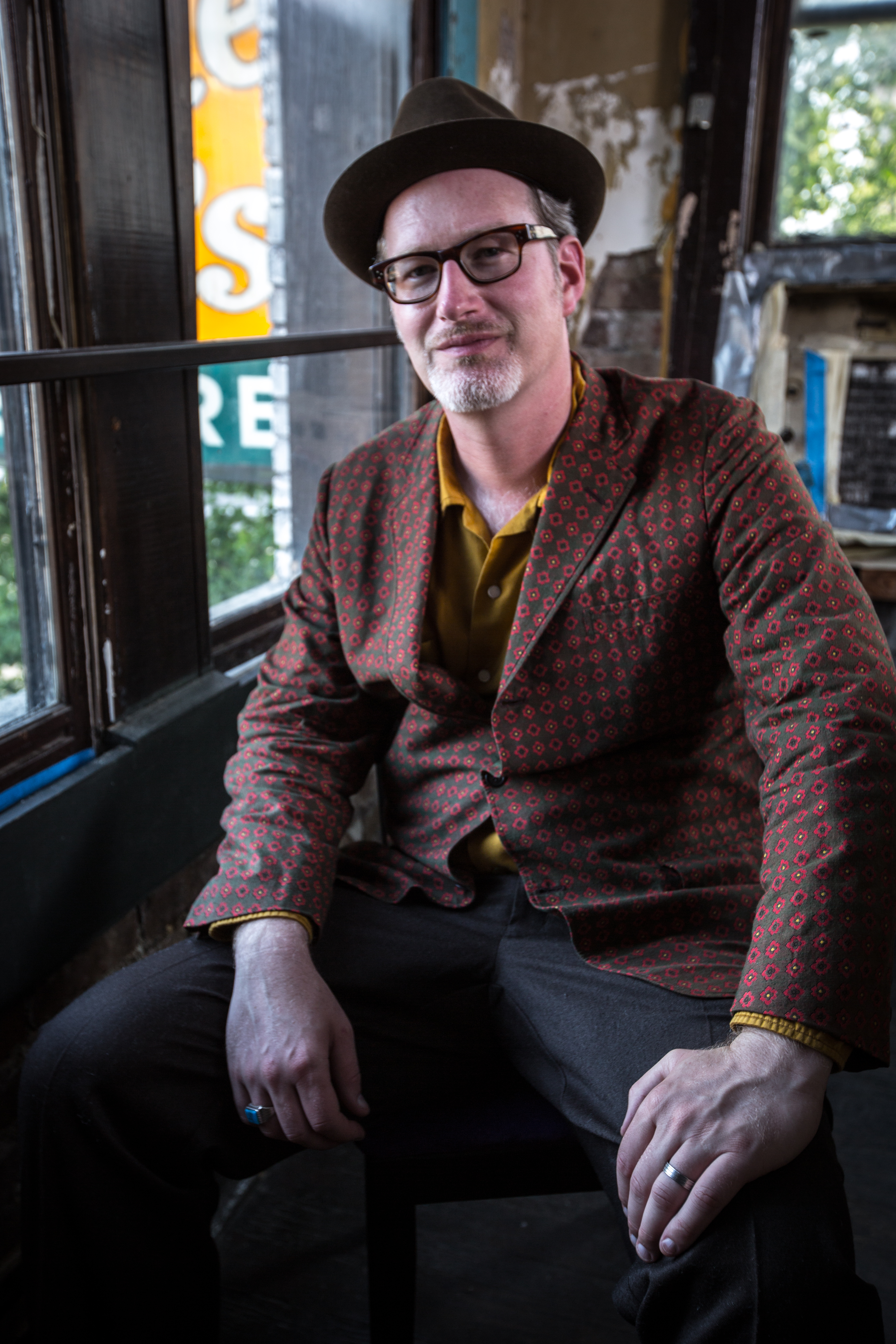
- Bomar in 2013

Background information
- Born: June 15, 1974 (age 51); Memphis, Tennessee, U.S.
- Genres: Soul, jazz, blues, Americana, soundtrack
- Occupations: Musician, composer, music producer, recording engineer
- Instruments: Bass, guitar, keyboards, percussion
- Years active: 1993–present

Scott Bomar (born June 15, 1974) is a Memphis-based musician, film composer, music producer, and recording engineer. Bomar's songs are represented by Downtown Music Publishing.

== Early years ==
A native of Memphis, Tennessee, Bomar was introduced to music at an early age, aided by his mother's record collection and regular exposure to Memphis' legendary musicians. His early mentors included Willie Mitchell, Roland Janes, and jazz guitarist Calvin Newborn. As a teenager, Bomar attended a Grammy in the Schools event where Steve Cropper of Booker T. & the M.G.'s spoke, inspiring him to pursue a career in music. He began working in studios around Memphis, developing his skills as a recording engineer and musician.

== Impala ==
Bomar's music career began in the early 1990s. Impala, consisting of guitarist John Stivers, saxophonist Justin Thompson, drummer Jeff Goggans, and Bomar on bass, gained national prominence on the strength of their debut album, El Rancho Reverbo, co-produced by Roland Janes. They signed with Estrus Records.

Following the release of Kings of the Strip, Impala toured relentlessly, appearing at a slew of garage rock festivals (including Garage Shock, Sleezefest, Crap Out, and Dixie Fried) and alongside guitar legends Dick Dale and Davie Allen and the Arrows.

Over the past decade, Impala has been featured on numerous occasions in film and on television, most notably for their arrangement of Henry Mancini's "Experiment in Terror", and Duane Eddy's "Stalkin'", as a medley, which appeared in the Chuck Barris biopic Confessions of a Dangerous Mind. The band's current lineup includes trumpeter/keyboardist, former Bobby "Blue" Bland sideman, and Bo-Keys member Marc Franklin.

In 2018, Impala released In the Late Hours on Bomar's Electraphonic Recording imprint. When premiering the song, "The Insomniac", Rolling Stone said it "...combines surf-guitar nostalgia with a minor-key, spy-movie-worthy riffage. Together, those influences form a truly unique sound, one that’s retro without lapsing into mimicry."

== The Bo-Keys and Al Green ==
Bomar gained individual prominence playing bass for Stax artists such as Rufus and Carla Thomas, Eddie Floyd, William Bell, Sun Records pioneer Rosco Gordon, and Motown session guitarist Dennis Coffey, both in studio session and on the road.

In 1998, he formed the Bo-Keys, a Memphis soul/funk group featuring former Stax/Volt, Hi Records and Isaac Hayes session players Skip Pitts, Howard Grimes and Ben Cauley.

Following the success of the Bo-Keys' critically acclaimed album The Royal Sessions, Bomar was asked to serve as assistant engineer on Al Green's comeback album, I Can't Stop, which was nominated for a Grammy in 2003. In 2005, Scott re-joined producer Willie Mitchell to record Al Green's Everything's Okay.

In 2005, the Bo-Keys performed on the film and soundtrack for Hustle & Flow as well as the Paramount/Nickelodeon animated feature Barnyard, directed by Bob Oedekirk. Three years later, they appeared in the film Soul Men, performing on-screen with Samuel L. Jackson and Bernie Mack. The group also added three songs to the film's soundtrack (produced by Bomar), including Anthony Hamilton's "Soul Music," which was nominated for a Grammy in 2009.

The Bo-Keys have performed at various festivals, including multiple appearances at The Ponderosa Stomp, London's Barbican Performing Arts Centre, and Lincoln Center's Midsummer Nights Swing Series.

== Film and television work ==
In 2005, Bomar composed the score for Craig Brewer's film Hustle & Flow. Touted as Memphis soul meets hip hop, Bomar's work on the film has received much critical acclaim.

Bomar's collaboration with Brewer continued in 2006 when he served as executive music producer and composer for the film Black Snake Moan. In preparation for the recording process, Bomar took Brewer and lead actor Samuel L. Jackson on a road trip through Mississippi, during which the trio met with a slew of blues musicians, working to parlay classics like "Stackolee" and "That Black Snake Moan" into modern sinister laments. Upon returning to the studio, Bomar enlisted musicians rooted in Memphis, including harmonicist Charlie Musselwhite, and the North Mississippi Allstars, the contemporary blues/rock group of Jim Dickinson and his sons Luther and Cody. He was later joined by the stars of the film, Samuel L. Jackson and Christina Ricci, to record songs subsequently performed on screen.

Bomar served as producer with Brewer on the MTV New Media series $5 COVER in 2009.

Bomar has since composed for films and television including Gospel Hill (2008), Mississippi Grind (2015), and Dolemite Is My Name (2019), the latter earning him a Black Reel Award and International Film Music Critics Association nominations. Variety described the Dolemite Is My Name score as "an original score that harks back to the blaxploitation era's funk-filled glory days."

In 2024, Bomar composed the score for Fight Night: The Million Dollar Heist, a Peacock limited series starring Kevin Hart, Samuel L. Jackson, and Taraji P. Henson. Reflecting on his approach to the score, Bomar told Soundtracks, Scores & More: "Some of my biggest inspirations are the 1960s and '70s film scores from Isaac Hayes, Quincy Jones, and Bernard Herrmann. With Fight Night, I was able to have some fun with those influences. This score features a lot of Moog synthesizer which really had the right feel for the show."

His recent work includes serving as executive music producer and composer for the 2025 feature film Song Sung Blue.

== Accomplishments ==
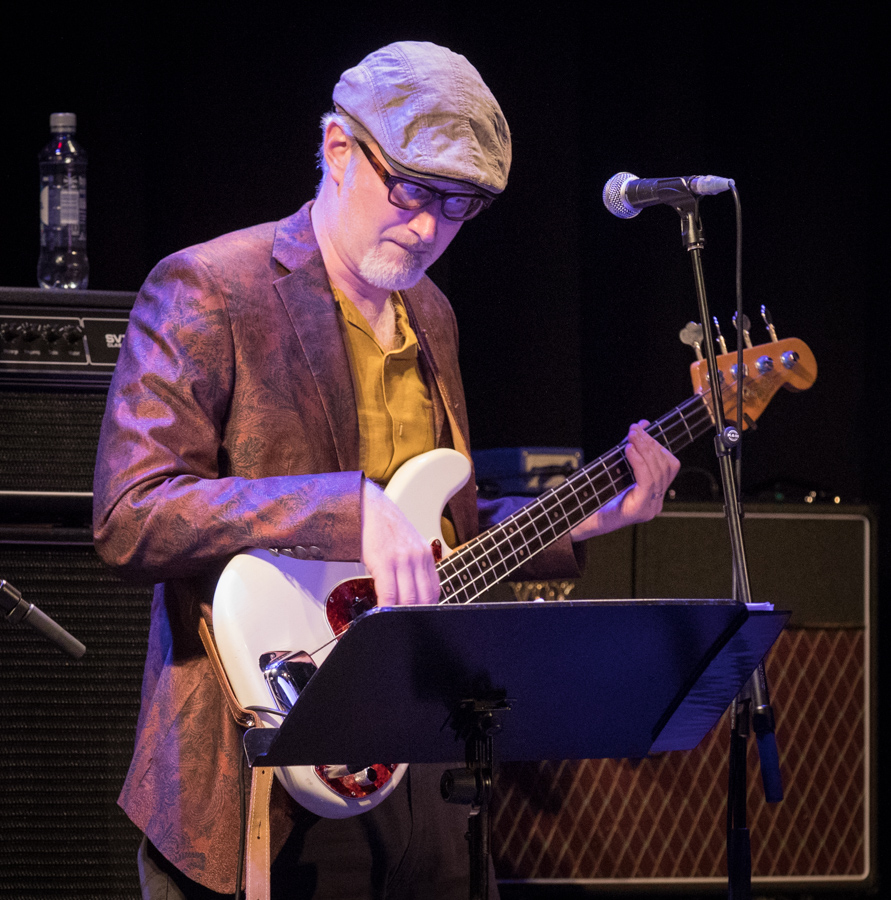
Bomar at stage with the Bo-Keys in 2017

Bomar won an Emmy for Best Original Music for the documentary I Am a Man: From Memphis, a Lesson in Life.

In 2010, he co-produced and engineered Cyndi Lauper's Memphis Blues at his Memphis studio, Electraphonic Recording. The album spent 13 weeks at No. 1 on the Billboard Blues chart and was nominated for a Grammy in the Best Traditional Blues Album category.

Bomar previously served as Trustee and President of the Memphis Chapter of NARAS.

== Discography (partial) ==
=== Film soundtracks ===
- Song Sung Blue (2025), composer
- Fight Night: The Million Dollar Heist (2024), composer
- Dolemite Is My Name (2019), composer
- Mississippi Grind (2015), composer
- Losers Take All (2011), composer
- I am a Man: From Memphis a Lesson in Life (2009), composer and main title producer for “I am a Man”
- $5 Cover: Memphis (2009), producer and composer
- Soul Men (2008), producer on “Private Number”, “Memphis Train” and “Soul Music”
- Gospel Hill (2008), composer and music supervisor
- Black Snake Moan (2006), executive music producer/composer
- Barnyard: The Original Party Animals (2006), producer on "Kick It"
- Hustle & Flow (2005), composer – original score
- Confessions of a Dangerous Mind (2002), producer on "Experiment in Terror"

=== Production/songwriting credits ===
- Don Bryant, You Make Me Feel - Producer/Engineer/Songwriter
- Dolemite Is My Name, Music from the Netflix Film – Artist
- Don Bryant, Don't Give Up on Love – Producer/Mixer/Songwriter
- Liz Brasher, Painted Image – Producer/Engineer
- William Bell, This Is Where I Live – Songwriter
- Scott Sharrard, Saving Grace – Producer/Engineer
- Cedric Burnside Project, Descendants of Hill Country – Engineer
- John Németh, Memphis Grease – Producer and Engineer (Blue Corn Music)
- Robin McKelle, Heart of Memphis – Producer and Engineer (Sony/Okeh)
- The City Champs, The Set-Up – Producer and Engineer (Electraphonic Records)
- Cyndi Lauper, Memphis Blues – Producer and Engineer (Downtown Records)
- The Bo-Keys, Got to Get Back ! – Producer and Mixing (Electraphonic Records)
- The City Champs, The Safecracker – Producer and Engineer (Electraphonic Records)
- Jay Reatard, Watch Me Fall – Engineer on “I’m Watching You” (Matador Records)
- Soul Men: Original Motion Picture Soundtrack – Producer on “Private Number,” “Memphis Train,” and “Soul Music” (Stax/Concord Records)
- Black Snake Moan: Music from the Motion Picture – Soundtrack Album Producer (New West Records)
- The Bo-Keys, The Royal Sessions – Producer and Mixing (Electraphonic Records)
- Calvin Newborn, Newborn – Producer and Mixing (Yellowdog Records)
- Al Green, Everything's OK – Assistant Engineer (Blue Note Records)
- Al Green, I Can't Stop – Assistant Engineer (Blue Note Records)

== Other sources ==
- Beifuss, John. "Movie with the Memphis Sound," The Commercial Appeal, 3 April 2008.
- Callaghan, Dylan. "Up and Coming Composers," The Hollywood Reporter, 19 April 2005.
- Donahue, Michael. "Moan Music Man," The Commercial Appeal, 21 October 2005.
- Lisle, Andria. "Sam in the Studio," The Memphis Flyer, 7 September 2005.
- Lisle, Andria. "Two Worlds Collide," The Memphis Flyer, 4 November 2005.
- Mehr, Bob. "South by Southwest: Tennessee Heats Up Texas," The Commercial Appeal, 13 March 2008.
- Morris, Chris. "Brewer's Moan Howls North Mississippi Blues," The Hollywood Reporter, 30 November 2006.
- Olsen, Mark. "Back to Memphis, This Time Making the City Moan," The New York Times, 11 February 2007.
