= Wild Women Don't Have the Blues =

Single by Ida Cox with Lovie Austin and her Blues Serenaders
- A-side: "Cherry Picking Blues"
- Released: 1924
- Recorded: Chicago, 1924
- Genre: Classic female blues
- Length: 2:24
- Label: Paramount (no. 12228)
- Songwriter: Ida Cox

"Wild Women Don't Have the Blues", "Wild Women Don't Get the Blues", or simply "Wild Women" is a vaudeville-style blues song recorded by American singer Ida Cox with Lovie Austin's Blues Serenaders in 1924. It has a strong feminist message. The song has been performed by numerous classic female blues singers, including Bessie Smith.

Later renditions include those by Francine Reed, Barbara Dane, Nancy Harrow, Sue Keller, as well as Cass Elliot with The Big 3. Some male performers, as Lyle Lovett, Clarke Peters and Dennis Rowland and groups such as San Francisco Gay Men's Chorus, Saffire, and the Vipers also recorded the tune. Cyndi Lauper included it as a bonus track on Memphis Blues.
