= Soulsville Charter School =

The Soulsville Charter School
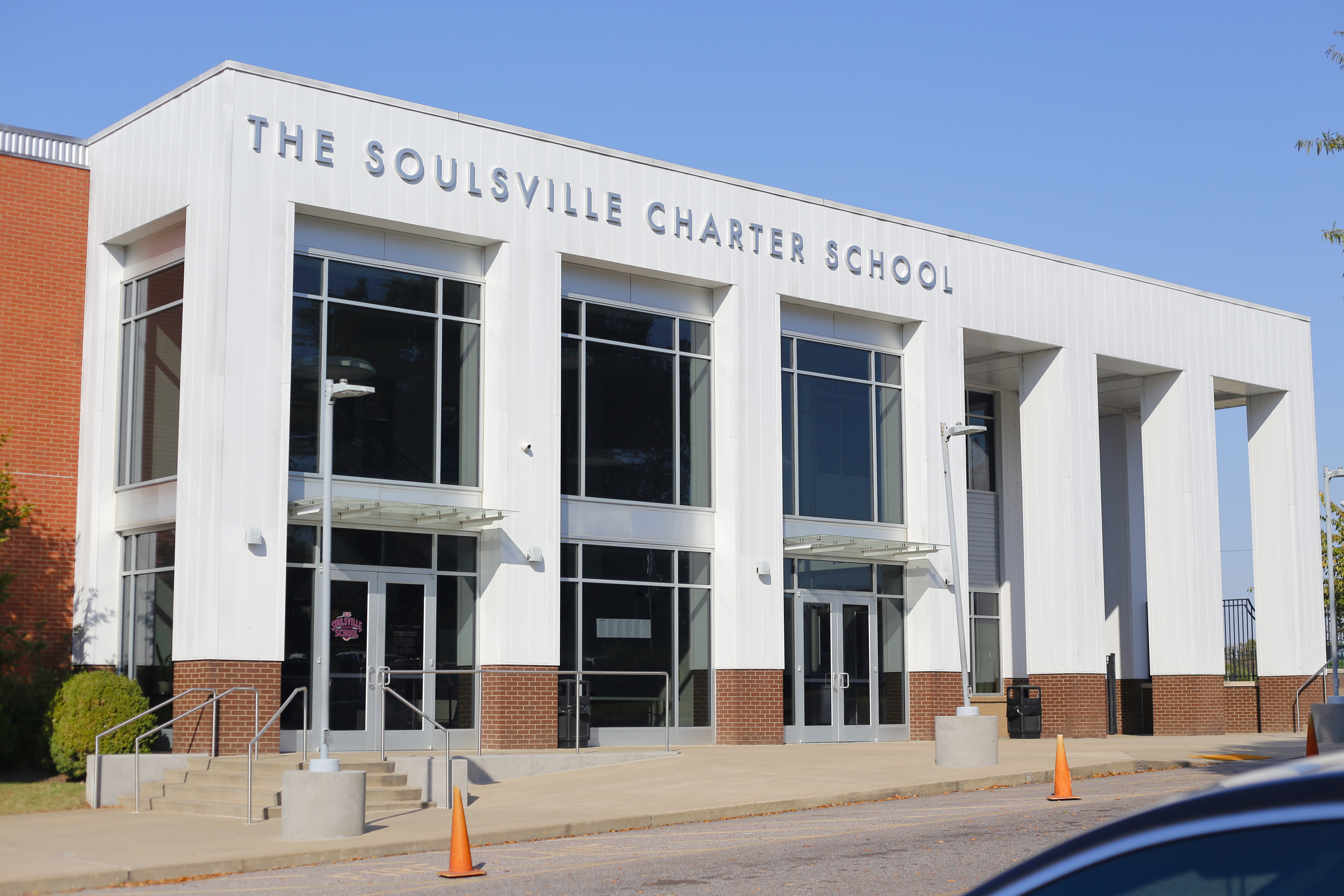
- The Soulsville Charter School main entrance

Location
- 1115 College Street; Memphis, Tennessee; United States
- 35.1163°N 90.0319°W

Information
- Type: Charter
- Established: 2005
- NCES School ID: 470294002088
- Teaching staff: 59.49 (FTE)
- Grades: 6 to 12
- Enrollment: 656 (2022-2023)
- Student to teacher ratio: 11.03
- Colors: Royal Purple and Silver
- Mascot: Tornadoes
- Nickname: The Soulsville Revolution
- Website: www.soulsvillecharterschool.org

The Soulsville Charter School (TSCS) is a charter school in South Memphis, Tennessee. It is located at 1115 College Street. The entire 2014 graduating class was accepted at 4-year colleges. Soulsville Charter School serves about 600 students in grades 6–12. It opened in 2005. The official nickname is The Soulsville Revolution, the school's teams compete as the Tornadoes, and the school colors are Royal Purple and Silver.

The school is operated as part of the Soulsville Foundation and Soulsville USA along with the Stax Museum of American Soul Music and the Stax Music Academy.

A new building for the school opened for the 2011–12 school year and the school celebrated its first graduating class in 2012. All of the seniors were accepted to college. Community partners include Rhodes College, the Memphis Symphony Orchestra, the IRIS Orchestra, Comcast, Archer Malmo, and International Paper.

The school has an extended school year that begins in August and ends in May and an extended school day (7:45–3:00 PM Monday-Thursday and 7:45–2:15 PM Friday). Soulsville Charter School also includes a required 3-week summer term. The Summer Growth Experiences (SGEs) have middle school students spend time on college campuses and high school students engage in a program that may be a job or internship, volunteer opportunity, or summer program. At least four Saturday sessions per school year (9:00–1:00PM) are also part of the schedule.

Most students participate in a string-and-rhythm orchestra program with the Soulsville Symphony Orchestra. They have performed for Isaac Hayes, Stevie Wonder, Frankie Beverly, and John Legend, and Kirk Whalum.
