= Blue & Lonesome (Rolling Stones album) =

Studio album by the Rolling Stones
- Released: 2 December 2016
- Recorded: 11, 14–15 December 2015
- Studios: British Grove, London
- Genres: Electric blues; Chicago blues; blues rock
- Length: 42:36
- Label: Polydor
- Producers: Don Was; The Glimmer Twins

The Rolling Stones chronology
The Rolling Stones in Mono (2016)	Blue & Lonesome (2016)	Ladies and Gentlemen: The Rolling Stones (2017)

The Rolling Stones studio album chronology
A Bigger Bang (2005)	Blue & Lonesome (2016)	Hackney Diamonds (2023)

Singles from Blue and Lonesome
- 1. "Just Your Fool" Released: 6 October 2016; 2. "Hate to See You Go" Released: 21 October 2016; 3. "Ride 'Em on Down" Released: 25 November 2016 (label: UMC; cat no. 5717752)

Blue & Lonesome is the twenty-third studio album by the English rock band the Rolling Stones, released on 2 December 2016. Consisting entirely of blues music, it is the band's first album to feature only cover songs. The album is also their first studio release since 2005's A Bigger Bang, with its 11-year gap being the longest between two albums from the band. Despite the running time of approximately 43 minutes, the album was released as a double LP. "Just Your Fool", a Buddy Johnson cover (though the Rolling Stones version is based on Little Walter's arrangement) was released as the first single from the album on 6 October. The name of the album is from a song which Little Walter wrote, "Blue and Lonesome".

The album included the same production and musician team as A Bigger Bang. Joining vocalist Mick Jagger and guitarist Keith Richards as producers was Don Was, who had been working with the group for most of the prior two decades. In the studio were band members Ronnie Wood (guitar) and Charlie Watts (drums), alongside contract players Darryl Jones (bass), Chuck Leavell (keyboards) and Matt Clifford (multi-instrumentalist). Eric Clapton played guitar on two tracks and drummer Jim Keltner played percussion on another.

The album was recorded during three sessions in December 2015 and sold well after its release a year later. It reached number one on the album charts in the UK and over a dozen other countries, and number four in the United States. It was certified Gold or Platinum in several countries. The first Stones album of the streaming media age, many of the songs from the album charted on several Top 40 digital music charts, and the lead single "Just Your Fool" was a Top 40 hit on several airplay and genre-specific charts. The album received four- and five-star ratings from many music journalists, and accolades from jazz and blues publications. It was awarded the Grammy Award for Best Traditional Blues Album in 2018, the band's first Grammy in 23 years.

It was the band's final album with drummer Charlie Watts who died in 2021.

== Background ==
Blue & Lonesome was recorded over a three-day period in December 2015. In April 2016, at the launch of the Rolling Stones career retrospective Exhibitionism, the band confirmed that their new album was due to be released "some time in the autumn". Richards said the album would feature "a lot of Chicago blues". Eric Clapton plays guitar on two tracks; he was recording his own album I Still Do in the same studio as the Stones were and was asked to play on a few tracks. The album is entirely blues-based, consisting of covers of artists such as Howlin' Wolf and Little Walter.

It is the first album since Dirty Work (1986) to not feature any guitar playing from Jagger (who instead concentrates completely on vocals and harmonica), although he is pictured in the album's booklet playing guitar during the album's sessions. It is also the first album since It's Only Rock 'n Roll (1974) to not feature a lead vocal from Richards. Likewise, it is also the first album since Dirty Work to release a lead single that was not a Jagger/Richards composition with "Just Your Fool".

== Promotion ==
On 6 October 2016, the Rolling Stones changed their tongue and lips logo, which first appeared on their Sticky Fingers album, from red to blue.

On 8 November 2016, the Rolling Stones released a video for "Hate to See You Go".

On 25 November 2016, the Stones released a one-track limited edition electric blue 10" vinyl record of "Ride 'Em On Down" (on the UMC label) on the occasion of the Record Store Day Black Friday 2016. The track is a cover of Eddie Taylor's "Ride 'Em On Down" originally recorded by Taylor in Chicago on 5 December 1955 for the Vee-Jay Label (and released as VJ 185).

On 1 December 2016, they released a video for "Ride 'Em On Down". The video features actress Kristen Stewart driving through Los Angeles in a blue 1968 Ford Mustang Fastback.

== Release and reception ==
Professional ratings
Aggregate scores
Source	Rating
AnyDecentMusic?	7.6/10
Metacritic	82/100
Review scores
Source	Rating
AllMusic	4.5/5 stars
The Daily Telegraph	5/5 stars
The Guardian	4/5 stars
The Independent	4/5 stars
NME	4/5 stars
The Observer	4/5 stars
Pitchfork	6.9/10
Q	4/5 stars
Rolling Stone	4.5/5 stars
USA Today	3/4 stars

During its first week the album moved 106,000 sales to debut at No. 1 on the UK Albums Chart, the second-highest opening sales week for an album in the UK in 2016. On 3 February 2017 it was certified Platinum, for sales over 300,000 copies. It also debuted at No. 4 on the US Billboard 200 with 123,000 album-equivalent units, of which 120,000 were pure album sales. It was also the No. 2 best-selling album of the week in the US. Despite strong initial sales, the album remains to this day the only Stones' studio album without at least a Gold certification for certified sales in the US.

According to the review aggregator Metacritic, Blue & Lonesome received "universal acclaim" based on a weighted average score of 82 out of 100 from 21 critic scores. Kitty Empire from The Observer called it "a labour of love", while Alexis Petridis of The Guardian said the Stones here are "more alive than they've sounded for years". Robert Christgau was less impressed in Vice, saying the album is "a sodden thing – many old rockers have recorded sharper, spunkier, wiser music". Greil Marcus was not impressed either, writing that "except for Mick Jagger everyone sounds bored."

== Accolades ==
The album won Album of the Year at the 2017 Jazz FM Awards. The Rolling Stones also won the Blues Artist of the Year Award at the event, held in April 2017.

On January 28, 2018, Blue & Lonesome received a Grammy Award for Best Traditional Blues Album of the Year at the 60th Annual Grammy Awards. The award was the Stones' third Grammy of their career and their first win since the 1995 show.

== Track listing ==
Blue & Lonesome track listing
No.	Title	Writer(s)	Length
1.	"Just Your Fool"	Buddy Johnson	2:16
2.	"Commit a Crime"	Howlin' Wolf	3:38
3.	"Blue and Lonesome"	Little Walter	3:07
4.	"All of Your Love"	Magic Sam	4:46
5.	"I Gotta Go"	Little Walter	3:26
6.	"Everybody Knows About My Good Thing"	Miles Grayson; Lermon Horton	4:30
7.	"Ride 'Em On Down"	Eddie Taylor	2:48
8.	"Hate to See You Go"	Little Walter	3:20
9.	"Hoo Doo Blues"	Otis Hicks; Jerry West	2:36
10.	"Little Rain"	Ewart G. Abner Jr.; Jimmy Reed	3:32
11.	"Just Like I Treat You"	Willie Dixon	3:24
12.	"I Can't Quit You Baby"	Willie Dixon	5:13
Total length:			42:36

== Personnel ==
Personnel from Blue & Lonesome liner notes.

=== The Rolling Stones ===
- Mick Jagger – vocals, harmonica
- Keith Richards – guitar
- Ronnie Wood – guitar
- Charlie Watts – drums

=== Additional musicians ===
- Darryl Jones – bass guitar
- Chuck Leavell – acoustic piano (1, 2, 4, 6, 9, 11), Hammond B3 (3, 5, 7, 12)
- Eric Clapton – slide guitar (6), guitar (12)
- Matt Clifford – Wurlitzer piano (1–3, 5, 7, 9, 11, 12), electric keyboards (4, 8, 10), Hammond B3 (6, 8, 10)
- Jim Keltner – percussion (9)

=== Production and design ===
- Don Was – producer
- The Glimmer Twins – producers
- Krish Sharma – recording engineer, mixer
- Derrick Stockwell – assistant engineer
- Nico Essig – assistant engineer
- Jason Elliott – assistant engineer
- Andy Cook – assistant engineer
- The Rolling Stones – liner notes
- Richard Havers – liner notes
- Stephen Marcussen – mastering (CD)
- Stewart Whitmore – mastering (CD)
- Ron McMaster – mastering (vinyl)
- Studio Fury – design and art direction

== Charts ==
=== Weekly charts ===
Weekly chart performance for Blue & Lonesome
Chart (2016–2018)	Peak position
Argentine Albums (CAPIF)	1
Australian Albums (ARIA)	1
Austrian Albums (Ö3 Austria)	1
Belgian Albums (Ultratop Flanders)	1
Belgian Albums (Ultratop Wallonia)	1
Brazilian Albums (ABPD)	4
Canadian Albums (Billboard)	2
Croatian International Albums (HDU)	1
Czech Albums (ČNS IFPI)	1
Danish Albums (Hitlisten)	2
Dutch Albums (Album Top 100)	1
Finnish Albums (Suomen virallinen lista)	5
French Albums (SNEP)	2
German Albums (Offizielle Top 100)	1
Greek Albums (IFPI)	2
Hungarian Albums (MAHASZ)	12
Irish Albums (IRMA)	4
Italian Albums (FIMI)	4
Japanese Albums (Oricon)	3
Japanese International Albums (Oricon)	1
Mexican Albums (AMPROFON)	18
New Zealand Albums (RMNZ)	2
Norwegian Albums (VG-lista)	1
Polish Albums (ZPAV)	1
Portuguese Albums (AFP)	2
Scottish Albums (Official Charts)	1
South Korean Albums (Gaon)	73
South Korean International Albums (Gaon)	9
Spanish Albums (Promusicae)	4
Swedish Albums (Sverigetopplistan)	1
Swiss Albums (Schweizer Hitparade)	1
UK Albums (Official Charts)	1
UK Jazz & Blues Albums (Official Charts)	1
US Billboard 200	4
US Top Blues Albums (Billboard)	1
US Top Rock Albums (Billboard)	1

=== Year-end charts ===
2016 year-end chart performance for Blue & Lonesome
Chart (2016)	Position
Australian Albums (ARIA)	22
Austrian Albums (Ö3 Austria)	15
Belgian Albums (Ultratop Flanders)	22
Belgian Albums (Ultratop Wallonia)	22
Danish Albums (Hitlisten)	66
Dutch Albums (MegaCharts)	8
French Albums (SNEP)	26
German Albums (Official German Charts)	5
Italian Albums (FIMI)	37
New Zealand Albums (RMNZ)	28
Polish Albums (ZPAV)	30
Spanish Albums (PROMUSICAE)	40
Swiss Albums (Schweizer Hitparade)	30
UK Albums (OCC)	17

2017 year-end chart performance for Blue & Lonesome
Chart (2017)	Position
Australian Albums (ARIA)	62
Austrian Albums (Ö3 Austria)	35
Belgian Albums (Ultratop Flanders)	23
Belgian Albums (Ultratop Wallonia)	27
Canadian Albums (Billboard)	41
Dutch Albums (MegaCharts)	32
French Albums (SNEP)	109
German Albums (Offizielle Top 100)	71
New Zealand Albums (RMNZ)	37
Spanish Albums (PROMUSICAE)	33
Swiss Albums (Schweizer Hitparade)	6
UK Albums (OCC)	97
US Billboard 200	111
US Top Rock Albums (Billboard)	9

== Certifications and sales ==
Certifications and sales for Blue & Lonesome
Region	Certification	Certified units/sales
Australia (ARIA)	Gold	35,000^{^}
Austria (IFPI Austria)	Platinum	15,000^{*}
Belgium (BRMA)	Platinum	30,000^{*}
Canada (Music Canada)	Gold	40,000^{‡}
Denmark (IFPI Danmark)	Gold	10,000^{‡}
France (SNEP)	2× Platinum	200,000^{‡}
Germany (BVMI)	3× Gold	300,000^{‡}
Italy (FIMI)	Gold	25,000^{*}
Netherlands (NVPI)	2× Platinum	80,000^{‡}
New Zealand (RMNZ)	Gold	7,500^{‡}
Poland (ZPAV)	Platinum	20,000^{‡}
Spain (Promusicae)	Gold	20,000^{‡}
United Kingdom (BPI)	Platinum	358,564
Summaries
Worldwide	—	1,800,000
^{*} Sales figures based on certification alone.^{^} Shipments figures based on certification alone.^{‡} Sales+streaming figures based on certification alone.
