= Gospel Hill =

2008 film by Giancarlo Esposito

- DVD cover
- Directed by: Giancarlo Esposito
- Screenplay by: Jeff Stacy; Jeffrey Pratt Gordon; Terrell Tannen
- Story by: Jeff Stacy; Jeffrey Pratt Gordon
- Produced by: Giancarlo Esposito; Cerise Hallam-Larkin; Emerson Machtus; Freddy Braidy; Scott M. Rosenfelt; B. Billie Greif
- Starring: Adam Baldwin; Angela Bassett; Tom Bower; Giancarlo Esposito; Danny Glover; Chloe Bailey; Taylor Kitsch; Nia Long; RZA; Julia Stiles
- Cinematography: David Tumblety
- Edited by: Tina Pacheco
- Music by: Scott Bomar
- Production companies: Future Films; Full Glass Films; Premiere Picture; Quiet Hand Productions; Deco Entertainment
- Distributed by: ArtMattan Productions
- Release dates: October 3, 2008 (Woodstock Film Festival); February 10, 2009 (United States)
- Running time: 99 minutes
- Country: United States
- Language: English

Gospel Hill is a 2008 American independent drama film directed and produced by Giancarlo Esposito (in his directorial debut) and written by Jeff Stacy, Jeffrey Pratt Gordon, and Terrell Tannen. Esposito also stars alongside Adam Baldwin, Angela Bassett, Tom Bower, Danny Glover, Taylor Kitsch, Chloe Bailey, Nia Long, RZA, and Julia Stiles. The film premiered at the Woodstock Film Festival on October 3, 2008, was released on DVD in the United States on February 10, 2009.

== Plot ==
Gospel Hill tells the intersecting story of two men in the fictional South Carolina town of Julia. Danny Glover plays John Malcolm, the son of a slain civil rights activist Paul Malcolm (Samuel L. Jackson). Jack Herrod (Tom Bower) is the white former sheriff who never officially solved the murder. Their paths begin to cross when a development corporation comes to town with plans to raze Julia's historic African-American community of Gospel Hill, now fallen into disrepair, to build a golf course. John Malcolm's wife Sarah (Angela Bassett), a schoolteacher, seems alone in her opposition to the project, which is being endorsed by Gospel Hill's prominent African-American physician, Dr. Palmer (Esposito). Meanwhile, a young white teacher (Julia Stiles) comes to town and falls for a handsome young landscaper (Taylor Kitsch), whose business is booming thanks to Dr. Palmer's patronage.

== Cast ==
- Adam Baldwin as Carl Herrod
- Angela Bassett as Sarah Malcolm
- Tom Bower as Jack Herrod
- Julia Stiles as Rosie
- Chris Ellis as L. Don Murray
- Giancarlo Esposito as Dr. Palmer
- Danny Glover as John Malcolm
- Samuel L. Jackson as Paul Malcolm (uncredited)
- Taylor Kitsch as Joel Herrod
- Chloe Bailey as Anna
- RZA as Lonnie (as The RZA)
- Nia Long as Mrs. Yvonne Palmer
