= Just Your Fool =

Single by Little Walter

Single by Buddy Johnson and His Orchestra
- B-side: "A-12"
- Released: 1954
- Recorded: New York City, 1953
- Genre: Rhythm and blues
- Length: 2:49
- Label: Mercury
- Songwriter: Buddy Johnson

"Just Your Fool" (or "I'm Just Your Fool" as it was first titled) is a rhythm and blues-style song written and recorded by the American jazz and jump blues bandleader/pianist Buddy Johnson and His Orchestra in 1953. Called an "R&B anthem", the song has a big-band arrangement and his sister Ella Johnson on vocals—her "delicate and deceptively sweet phrasing was ideally suited to ballads such as this". "I'm Just Your Fool" became a Billboard R&B chart record hit, reaching number six in 1954.

== Little Walter version ==
Little Walter recorded a Chicago blues adaptation of the song using the title "Just Your Fool". It was recorded in December 1960 in Chicago, with Walter (vocal and blues harp) and backing by Otis Spann (piano), Fred Robinson and Luther Tucker (guitars), Willie Dixon and/or Jimmie Lee Robinson (bass), and Fred Below or George Hunter (drums). "Just Your Fool" was not released until 1962 by Checker Records. He used lyrics and an eight-bar blues arrangement similar to Buddy Johnson. Checker credits the song to Little Walter, also known as Walter Jacobs.

== Cyndi Lauper version ==
In 2010, the American singer Cyndi Lauper recorded "Just Your Fool" for her album Memphis Blues. Charlie Musselwhite on blues harp accompanies Lauper on vocals. The song was released as a single and reached number two on Billboard magazine's US Digital Blues Songs chart. She performed it live with Musselwhite on the third-season finale of the Celebrity Apprentice reality game show.

== The Rolling Stones version ==
"Just Your Fool"

Single by the Rolling Stones

from the album Blue & Lonesome
- Released: October 6, 2016
- Studio: British Grove, London
- Genre: Rhythm and blues, blues rock
- Length: 2:16
- Label: Polydor
- Songwriter: Walter Jacobs a.k.a. Little Walter (credited)
- Producers: Don Was; The Glimmer Twins

The Rolling Stones singles chronology
"One More Shot" (2013)	"Just Your Fool" (2016)	"Hate to See You Go" (2016)

The Rolling Stones recorded the song in 2016 for their album Blue & Lonesome. It is one of four Little Walter songs included on the album. On October 6, 2016, it was released as the lead single.

=== Personnel ===
Personnel per liner notes.

The Rolling Stones

- Mick Jagger – vocals, harmonica
- Keith Richards – guitar
- Ronnie Wood – guitar
- Charlie Watts – drums

Additional musicians

- Darryl Jones – bass guitar
- Chuck Leavell – acoustic piano
- Matt Clifford – Wurlitzer piano

=== Charts ===
Chart (2016)	Peak position
Belgium (Ultratip Bubbling Under Flanders)	31
Belgium (Ultratip Bubbling Under Wallonia)	43
France (SNEP)	39
Mexico Ingles Airplay (Billboard)	28
Scottish Singles Sales (Official Charts)	80
Switzerland (Schweizer Hitparade)	81
US Adult Alternative Songs (Billboard)	27
US Digital Blues Songs (Billboard)	1
US Hot Rock Songs (Billboard)	49
