= Rainbow (Curtis Mayfield song) =

Single by Gene Chandler
- A-side: "You Threw A Lucky Punch"
- Released: 1962
- Genre: R&B
- Length: 2:45
- Label: Vee-Jay Records
- Songwriter: Curtis Mayfield

Rainbow is a popular song written by Curtis Mayfield. Recorded by Gene Chandler in 1962, the single released on Vee-Jay Records spent 12 weeks on the Billboard Hot 100 chart. In 1965, Gene Chandler scored another hit with this song when he recorded Rainbow '65 (Part 1).

Notable artists who have recorded the song include Keith Frank, Loleatta Holloway, and Lenny Breau.
