= Stax Music Academy =

Music school in Memphis, Tennessee, United States

Coordinates: 35.1157°N 90.0319°W

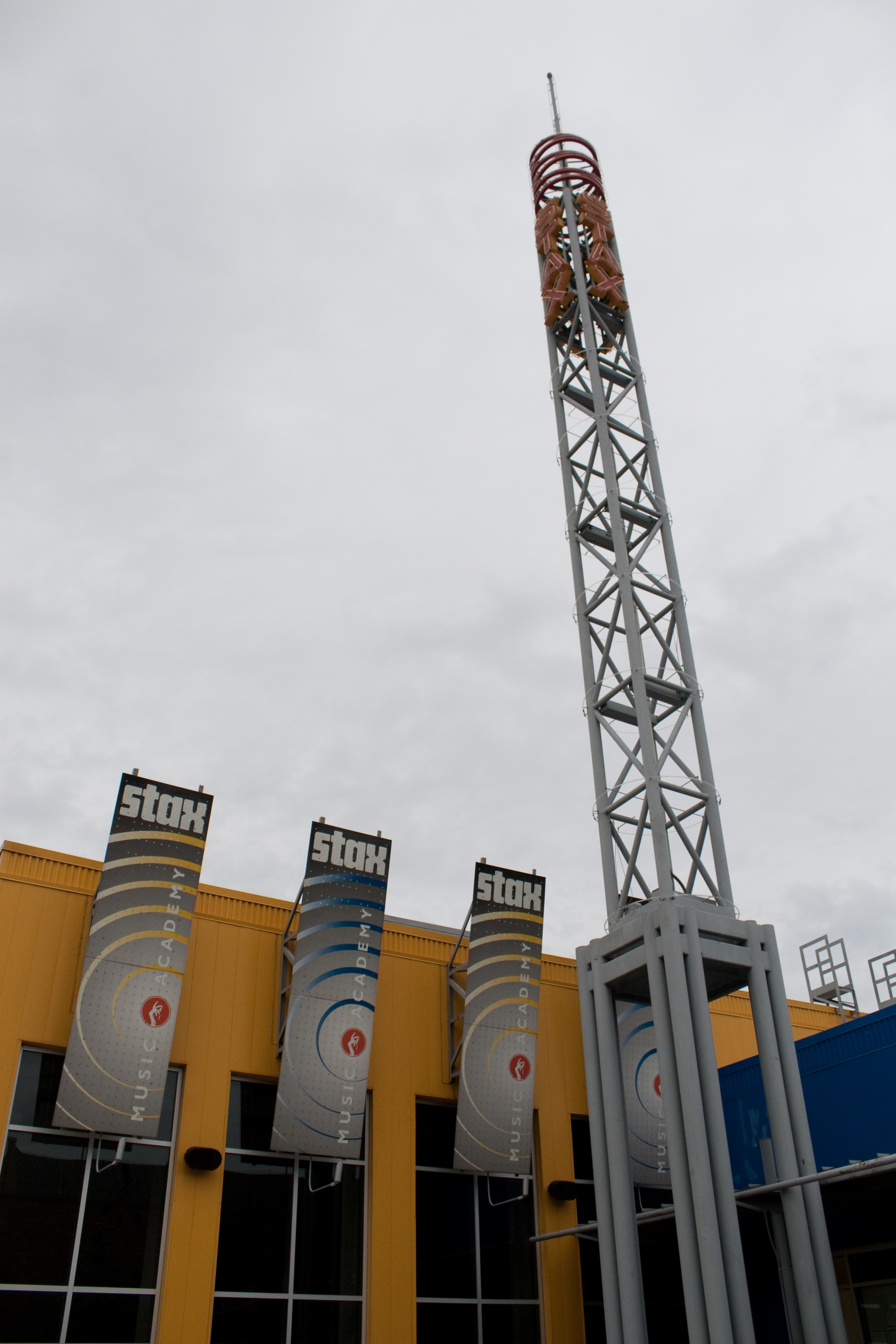
Stax Tower at Stax Music Academy

Stax Music Academy located in South Memphis, Tennessee, offers after-school and summer music programs for students in grades 6-12. Notable alumni include Kris Thomas from The Voice and Kirby Lauryen, a Roc Nation songwriter.

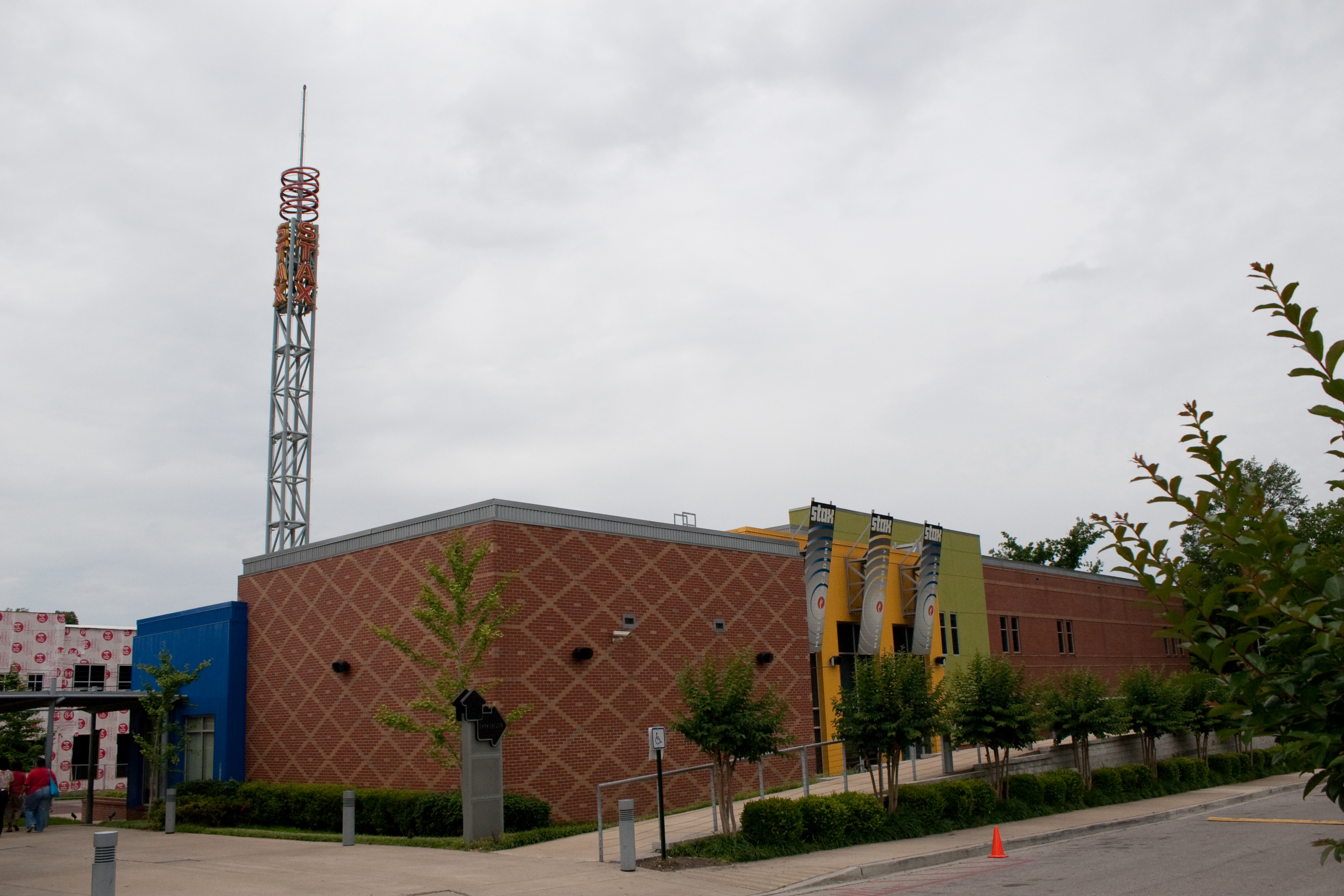
Stax Music Academy

The Soulsville Foundation operates Stax Music Academy and the adjacent Stax Museum at 926 McLemore Avenue. Situated on the historic grounds of the former Stax Records, where legendary artists like Otis Redding, Isaac Hayes, and Booker T. & the MGs once recorded, the academy is steeped in musical history and heritage.

At Stax Music Academy, a registered 501 (c)(3), a group of professional musicians/instructors instill soul in the next generation of Memphis artists. Stax Music Academy students take classes in music theory, preparing them to read music with proficiency, read and perform all twelve major and minor scales, and apply harmonic analysis to a musical selection. Students are required to participate in moderated juries at the end of each semester that tests both their performance acumen and their western theoretical grasp of music. Students learn the art of storytelling and composition to create their own music plus music business to assure each young artist understands how to make a living in the music industry.

== See also ==
- The Soulsville Charter School
