= Little Walter discography =

- Compilation albums: 8
- Singles: 36
- Singles as accompanist: 49
- Albums as accompanist: 9

Little Walter (1930–1968) was an American blues artist who is generally regarded as the most influential blues harmonica player of his era. Most of his earliest recordings were as a sideman, when he contributed harmonica to songs by Chicago blues musicians such as Jimmy Rogers and Muddy Waters. As the featured artist, he recorded the instrumental "Juke" in 1952. The single reached number one on the Billboard Rhythm and Blues chart (Note: "Juke" reached No. 1 on two of Billboard's Rhythm & Blues charts, the Juke Box and Best Selling Retail charts.) and launched his career as a solo artist.

Little Walter c. 1956

A string of popular singles followed, including "Mean Old World", "Blues with a Feeling", and "Key to the Highway". His "My Babe" was one of the biggest R&B sellers of 1955. In addition to his solo career, Little Walter continued to record harmonica for songs by other artists. His harmonica can be heard on many of Muddy Waters' most famous songs, such as "I'm Your Hoochie Coochie Man", "I Just Want to Make Love to You", and "Got My Mojo Working".

Little Walter recorded at a time when blues musicians were primarily singles artists. His records were released on Checker Records, run by the Chess brothers, Leonard and Phil. The one album released during his lifetime is a compilation issued by Chess Records, titled The Best of Little Walter (1958). Rolling Stone magazine ranked it at number 198 in its list of the "500 Greatest Albums of All Time". Little Walter died in 1968, a time when interest in electric blues shifted the focus from singles to albums. Chess continued to issue compilations of his earlier singles as well as previously unreleased recordings. In 2009, The Complete Chess Masters: 1950–1967 was issued by the Checker/Chess successor, Hip-O Records/Universal. The five compact disc box set contains 126 recordings and is believed to represent all of his solo recordings. In 2010, the set received a Grammy Award for Best Historical Album.

== Singles ==
Most of Little Walter's first recordings from 1947 to 1951 were as a harmonica player backing bluesmen, such as Jimmy Rogers, Sunnyland Slim, and Muddy Waters. However, a few songs recorded during this period were issued on singles, which were credited to Little Walter. These include releases on Chance Records (as "Little Walter J."), and Parkway and Regal (as "Little Walter Trio"). After Leonard and Phil Chess began promoting him as a featured artist on their Checker label in 1952, his singles were variously credited as "Little Walter and His Night Cats", "Little Walter and His Nightcaps", "Little Walter and His Jukes", or simply "Little Walter". These singles were issued on 78 rpm and 45 rpm records, when they were the standard formats.

List of singles with title, year, label, chart peak, and reference(s)
Title A-side / B-side	Year	Label (Cat. no)	Chart peak U.S. R&B (Note: For singles up to "Who", chart peaks are taken from Billboard's Rhythm & Blues Juke Box charts. For those after "Who", the later consolidated "Hot R&B Sides" charts are used.)	Ref(s)
"Ora Nelle Blues" (AKA "That's All Right") / "I Just Keep Loving Her" (A-side by Othum Brown)	1947	Chance (1116)	—	
"Just Keep Lovin' Her" / "Moonshine Blues"	1950	Parkway (502)	—	
"Muskadine Blues" / "Bad Acting Woman"	1950	Regal (3296)	—	
"Juke" (i) / "Can't Hold Out Much Longer"	1952	Checker (758)	1	
"Sad Hours" (i) /	1952	Checker (764)	2	
"Mean Old World"	1952	Checker (764)	6	
"Don't Have to Hunt No More" (i) / "Tonight with a Fool" [this release withdrawn/cancelled]	1953	Checker (767)	—	
"Tell Me Mama" /	1953	Checker (770)	10	
"Off the Wall" (i)	1953	Checker (770)	8	
"Blues with a Feeling" / "Quarter to Twelve" (i)	1953	Checker (780)	2	
"You're So Fine" / "Lights Out" (i)	1953	Checker (786)	2	
"Oh Baby" / "Rocker" (i)	1954	Checker (793)	8	
"You Better Watch Yourself" / "Blue Light" (i)	1954	Checker (799)	8	
"Last Night" / "Mellow Down Easy"	1954	Checker (805)	6	
"My Babe" / "Thunder Bird" (i)	1955	Checker (811)	1	
"Roller Coaster" (i) / "I Got to Go"	1955	Checker (817)	6	
"Too Late" / "I Hate to See You Go (Come Back Baby)"	1955	Checker (825)	—	
"Who" / "It Ain't Right"	1956	Checker (833)	7	
"One More Chance with You" / "Flying Saucer" (i)	1956	Checker (838)	—	
"Just a Feeling" / "Teenage Beat" (i)	1956	Checker (845)	—	
"It's Too Late Brother" / "Take Me Back"	1956	Checker (852)	—	
"Nobody But You" / "Everybody Needs Somebody"	1957	Checker (859)	—	
"Boom, Boom Out Goes the Lights" / "Temperature"	1957	Checker (859)	—	
"The Toddle" (i) / "Confessin' the Blues"	1958	Checker (890)	—	
"Key to the Highway" / "Rock Bottom" (i)	1958	Checker (904)	6	
"My Baby Is Sweeter" / "Crazy Mixed-Up World"	1959	Checker (919)	—	
"Everything Gonna Be Alright" / "Back Track" (i)	1959	Checker (930)	25	
"Me and Piney Brown" / "Break It Up"	1959	Checker (938)	—	
"Ah'w Baby" / "I Had My Fun"	1960	Checker (945)	—	
"My Babe" [remix with female backing vocals added] / "Blue Midnight" (i)	1960	Checker (955)	(Note: An overdubbed/remixed "My Babe" reached No. 6 on Billboard's Bubbling Under Hot 100 Singles chart.)	
"I Don't Play" / "As Long as I Have You"	1961	Checker (968)	—	
"Crazy For My Baby" / "Crazy Legs"	1961	Checker (986)	—	
"Just Your Fool" / "I Got to Find My Baby"	1962	Checker (1013)	—	
"Up the Line" / "Southern Feeling" (i)	1963	Checker (1043)	—	
"Shake Dancer" (i) / "Diggin' My Potatoes" (B-side by Washboard Sam)	1964	Checker (1071)	—	
"I'm a Business Man" / "Dead Presidents"	1964	Checker (1081)	—	
"Mean Ole Frisco" / "Blue and Lonesome"	1965	Checker (1117)	—	
An (i) denotes an instrumental release; A dash (—) denotes a release that did not reach the charts.

== Selected compilation albums ==
As with most blues musicians before the mid-1960s, Little Walter was a singles artist. The one album released during his lifetime, the compilation Best of Little Walter, was issued on the Checker-affiliated Chess Records in 1958. After his death, additional songs were compiled on albums, sometimes by other record companies without authorization or, as author Richie Unterberger noted, the "legality was dubious". The compilation albums listed are issued by Chess and its successors.

List of compilation albums with title, album details, chart peak, and reference(s)
Title	Album details	Ref(s)
The Best of Little Walter	Released: 1958; Label: Chess (LP 1428); Format: Monaural LP record; Note: Includes 10 of his charting singles from 1952–1955, plus 2 B-sides	
Hate to See You Go	Released: 1969; Label: Chess (LP 1535); Format: LP; Note: 15 songs from 1955–1965	
Boss Blues Harmonica	Released: 1972; Label: Chess (2CH 60014); Format: Double LP; Note: 24 songs from 1952–1964	
Confessin' the Blues	Released: 1974; Label: Chess (CHV 416); Format: Mono/stereo LP; Note: 15 songs from 1953–1963	
The Best of Little Walter, Volume Two	Released: 1989; Label: Chess (CH/CHD-9292); Format: LP/CD; Note: 12 songs from 1952–1960	
The Essential Little Walter	Released: June 8, 1993; Label: Chess/MCA (CHD2-9342); Format: 2 CDs; Note: 46 songs, including some unreleased/alternate tracks	
Blues with a Feeling	Released: October 25, 1995; Label: Chess/MCA (CHD2-9357); Format: 2 CDs; Note: 40 songs, including many unreleased/alternate tracks	
His Best: The Chess 50th Anniversary Collection	Released: 1997; Label: Chess/MCA (CHD-9384); Format: CD; Note: Includes 12 of his 15 charting singles, plus 8 B-sides; essentially supersedes the 1958 The Best of Little Walter	
The Complete Chess Masters (1950–1967)	Released: 2009; Label: Hip-O/Universal (B0012636-02); Format: 5-CD box set; Note: 126 songs on 5 CDs; all known/available Checker/Chess recordings, including many alternate takes	

== As accompanist ==
=== Singles ===
List of singles with title, year, listed artist(s), label, chart peak, and reference(s)
Title A-side / B-side	Year	Listed artist(s)	Label (Cat. no)	Chart peak U.S. R&B (Note: Except for "Close to You", singles with Muddy Waters reflect the highest position on one the three Billboard Rhythm & Blues charts ("Juke Box", "Best Sellers", or "Jockeys") in use at the time. For "Close to You", the later consolidated "Hot R&B Sides" is used.)	Ref(s)
"Ora Nelle Blues" (AKA "That's All Right") / "I Just Keep Loving Her" (B-side by "Little Walter J.")	1947	Othum Brown	Chance (1116)	—	
"Blue Baby" / "I Want My Baby"	1948	Sunnyland Slim and Muddy Water [sic]	Tempo-Tone (TT-1002)	—	
"Boll Weevil" / "Red Headed Woman"	1950	Baby Face Leroy Trio	Parkway (104)	—	
"Rollin' and Tumblin' (Part 1)" / "Rollin' and Tumblin' (Part 2)"	1950	Baby Face Leroy Trio	Parkway (501)	—	
"You're Gonna Need My Help 'I Said' (Gonna Need My Help)" / "Sad Letter Blues"	1950	Muddy Waters	Chess (1434)	—	
"That's All Right" / "Ludella"	1950	Jimmy Rogers	Chess (1435)	—	
"Louisiana Blues" / "Evans Shuffle"	1950	Muddy Waters	Chess (1441)	10	
"Going Away Baby" / "Today Today Blues"	1950	Jimmy Rogers	Chess (1442)	—	
"Joliet Blues" / "So Glad I Found You"	1950	Johnny Shines	Chess (1443)	—	
"Long Distance Call" / "Too Young to Know"	1950	Muddy Waters	Chess (1452)	8	
"Wandering Lover" / "Lima Beans"	1951	Eddie Ware	Chess (1461)	—	
"Honey Bee" / "Appealing Blues"	1951	Muddy Waters	Chess (1468)	—	
"Money Marbles & Chalk" / "Chance to Love"	1951	Jimmy Rogers	Chess (1476)	—	
"Still a Fool" / "My Fault" (not on A-side)	1951	Muddy Waters	Chess (1480)	9	
"She Moves Me" / "Early Morning Blues (Before Daybreak)" (not on B-side)	1951	Muddy Waters	Chess (1490)	10	
"Dark Road" / "Big World"	1951	Floyd Jones	Chess (1498)	—	
"Jealous Woman" / "Give Love Another Chance" (not on B-side)	1952	Eddie Ware	Chess (1507)	—	
"All Night Long" / "Country Boy"	1952	Muddy Waters	Chess (1509)	—	
"Please Have Mercy" / "Looking for My Baby (I Can't Be Satisfied)" (not on B-side)	1952	Muddy Waters	Chess (1514)	—	
"Rattlesnake" / "It Was a Dream"	1952	John Brim	Checker (769)	—	
"Me and My Chauffeur" / "Broken Heart" (not on B-side)	1952	Memphis Minnie	Checker (771)	—	
"Turn the Lamp Down Low (Baby, Please Don't Go)" / "Who's Gonna Be Your Sweet Man" (not on B-side)	1953	Muddy Waters	Chess (1542)	—	
"Left Me with a Broken Heart" / "Act Like You Love Me"	1953	Jimmy Rogers	Chess (1543)	—	
"Mad Love (I Want You to Love Me)" / "Blow Wind Blow"	1953	Muddy Waters	Chess (1550)	6	
"I'm Your Hoochie Coochie Man" / "She's So Pretty"	1954	Muddy Waters	Chess (1560)	3	
"Just Make Love to Me (I Just Want to Make Love to You)" / "Oh Yeah"	1954	Muddy Waters	Chess (1571)	4	
"Chicago Bound" / "Sloppy Drunk"	1954	Jimmy Rogers	Chess (1574)	—	
"I'm Ready" / "I Don't Know Why"	1954	Muddy Waters	Chess (1579)	4	
"I'm a Natural Born Lover" / "Loving Man" (not on A-side)	1954	Muddy Waters	Chess (1585)	—	
"I Want to Be Loved" / "My Eyes (Keep Me in Trouble)"	1955	Muddy Waters	Chess (1596)	—	
"Manish Boy (Mannish Boy)" / "Young Fashioned Ways (Old Fashioned Ways)" (not on A-side)	1955	Muddy Waters	Chess (1602)	—	
"Diddley Daddy" / "She's Fine, She's Mine" (not on B-side)	1955	Bo Diddley	Checker (819)	—	
"Sugar Sweet (I Can't Call Her Sugar)" /	1955	Muddy Waters	Chess (1612)	11	
"Trouble No More"	1955	Muddy Waters	Chess (1612)	7	
"Blues All Day Long" / "You're the One"	1956	Jimmy Rogers	Chess (1616)	—	
"Forty Days and Forty Nights" / "All Aboard"	1956	Muddy Waters	Chess (1620)	7	
"Be Careful" / "You Got Me Where You Want Me"	1956	John Brim	Chess (1624)	—	
"Don't Go No Farther (You Need Meat)" / "Diamonds at Your Feet"	1956	Muddy Waters	Chess (1630)	9	
"Just to Be with You" / "I Got to Find My Baby"	1956	Muddy Waters	Chess (1644)	—	
"Got My Mojo Working" / "Rock Me"	1956	Muddy Waters	Chess (1652)	—	
"I Live the Life I Love (I Love the Life I Live)" / "Evil"	1957	Muddy Waters	Chess (1680)	—	
"Groaning the Blues" / "If You Were Mine"	1957	Otis Rush	Cobra (5010)	—	
"Love That Woman" / "Jump Sister Bessie"	1957	Otis Rush	Cobra (5015)	—	
"What Have I Done" / "Trace of You"	1957	Jimmy Rogers	Chess (1687)	—	
"Close to You" / "She's Nineteen Years Old"	1958	Muddy Waters	Chess (1704)	9	
"Walking Thru the Park (Walking in the Park)" / "Mean Mistreater"	1958	Muddy Waters	Chess (1718)	—	
"Clouds in My Heart" / "Ooh Wee"	1958	Muddy Waters	Chess (1724)	—	
"Read Way Back" / "I'm Your Doctor"	1960	Muddy Waters	Chess (1752)	—	
"Look What You've Done" / "Love Affair" (not on B-side)	1960	Muddy Waters	Chess (1758)	—	
"Got My Mojo Working, Part 1 (live)" / "Woman Wanted" (not on A-side)	1960	Muddy Waters	Chess (1774)	—	
A dash (—) denotes a release that did not reach the charts.

=== Albums ===
Songs recorded with Little Walter as a sideman are included on many compilations by Muddy Waters and Jimmy Rogers. Albums with four songs recorded live in the late 1960s have been released by several issuers of bootleg recordings. These often appear along with songs by Otis Rush on albums with titles such as Live in the Windy City and At the Chicago Blues Festival. Additional live recordings from the 1967 American Folk Blues Festival have circulated on unofficial sources.

List of albums with title, listed artists(s), album details, chart peak, and reference(s)
Title	Listed artist(s)	Album details	Ref(s)
Ramblin' on My Mind: A Collection of Classic Train and Travel Blues	Various artists	Released: 1966; Label: Milestone (MLP 3002); Format: LP; Note: Includes "Hear That Whistle Blow" recorded with Johnny Young c.1964	
Super Blues	Bo Diddley, Muddy Waters, and Little Walter	Released: June 1967 (Note: Koda places the Super Blues release date as November 1968, but Billboard included it in an announcement of "New Album Releases" on June 17, 1967.); Label: Checker (LP/S 3008); Format: LP; Recorded: January 4, 1967; Note: Collaborative album with remakes of 8 songs originally recorded by the 3 artists	
Masters of Modern Blues, Volume 4	Robert Nighthawk, Houston Stackhouse	Released: 1968; Label: Testament (T-2215); Format: LP; Note: Includes "Kansas City" recorded live with Nighthawk in 1964	
They Call Me Muddy Waters	Muddy Waters	Released: February 1971; Label: Chess (CH 1553); Format: LP; Note: Includes 6 songs recorded with Muddy Waters c.April and June 1967	
Johnny Young and His Friends	Johnny Young	Released: 1975; Label: Testament (T-2226); Format: LP; Note: Includes 3 songs recorded with Young in 1964	
The Blues World of Little Walter	Little Walter and Baby Face Leroy	Released: 1988; Label: Delmark (DD-648); Format: LP; Note: Includes 5 pre-Checker songs with Walter on unamplified harmonica, plus 3 more on rhythm guitar (also songs by other artists)	
Mandolin Blues	Johnny Young, Yank Rachell, Carl Martin, Willie Hatcher	Released: 1997; Label: Testament (TCD-6004); Format: CD; Note: Includes 2 songs recorded with Young c.1964	
Down Home Slide	Various artists	Released: 1998; Label: Testament (TCD-6009); Format: CD; Note: Includes 3 songs recorded with Nighthawk in 1964	
Down Home Harp	Various artists	Released: 1998; Label: Testament (TCD-6011); Format: CD; Note: Includes 2 songs recorded with Young and Nighthawk in 1964	

== Notes ==
Footnotes

Citations

References

- "Bubbling Under the Hot 100". Billboard. Vol. 72, no. 27. July 4, 1960. ISSN 0006-2510.
- "New Album Releases". Billboard. Vol. 79, no. 24. June 17, 1967. ISSN 0006-2510.
- Dahl, Bill (1996). "Little Walter". In Erlewine, Michael; Bogdanov, Vladimir; Woodstra, Chris; Koda, Cub (eds.). All Music Guide to the Blues. Miller Freeman Books. ISBN 0-87930-424-3.
- Glover, Tony (2002). Blues with a Feeling: The Little Walter Story. Routledge. ISBN 978-0415937108.
- Koda, Cub (1996). "Little Walter, Muddy Waters". In Erlewine, Michael; Bogdanov, Vladimir; Woodstra, Chris; Koda, Cub (eds.). All Music Guide to the Blues. Miller Freeman Books. ISBN 0-87930-424-3.
- Unterberger, Richie (1996). "Little Walter". In Erlewine, Michael; Bogdanov, Vladimir; Woodstra, Chris; Koda, Cub (eds.). All Music Guide to the Blues. Miller Freeman Books. ISBN 0-87930-424-3.
- Whitburn, Joel (1988). "Little Walter, Muddy Waters". Top R&B Singles 1942–1988. Record Research. ISBN 0-89820-068-7.
