= The Best of Little Walter =

Greatest hits album by Little Walter
- Released: 1957
- Recorded: May 12, 1952 – January 25, 1955 in Chicago, Illinois
- Genre: Chicago blues
- Length: 35:44
- Label: Checker LP 1428
- Producer: Leonard Chess, Phil Chess, Willie Dixon

Little Walter chronology
The Best of Little Walter (1957)	Hate to See You Go (1969)

Professional ratings
Review scores
Source	Rating
AllMusic	5/5 stars
The Encyclopedia of Popular Music	4/5 stars
Record Mirror	3/5 stars
The Rolling Stone Album Guide	5/5 stars

The Best of Little Walter is the first LP record by American blues performer Little Walter. First released in 1957, the compilation album contains ten Little Walter songs that appeared in the Top 10 of the Billboard R&B chart from 1952 to 1955, plus two B-sides. The album was first released by Checker Records as LP-1428, which was the first LP record released by Checker, and then released on Chess Records with the same catalog number. It was the first and only album released during Little Walter's lifetime.

The album has been reissued numerous times, although it has been largely superseded by the 20-song collection Little Walter His Best: Chess 50th Anniversary Collection.

== Artwork and packaging ==
The album cover features a black-and-white photo portrait shot by Grammy Award winning photographer Don Bronstein of Little Walter holding/playing a Hohner 64 Chromatic harmonica and liner notes by Studs Terkel, who had written Giants of Jazz. The original LP featured a black label.

== Accolades ==
In 1991, The Best of Little Walter was inducted into the Blues Foundation Hall of Fame in the "Classics of Blues Recordings – Album" category. In 2003, the album was ranked No. 198 in Rolling Stone magazine's list of the "500 Greatest Albums of All Time".

== Track listing ==
All tracks are written by Walter Jacobs (Little Walter), except where noted.

Side one
No.	Title	Length
1.	"My Babe" (Willie Dixon)	2:44
2.	"Sad Hours"	3:15
3.	"You're So Fine"	3:07
4.	"Last Night"	2:46
5.	"Blues with a Feeling" (Rabon Tarrant, re-written by Jacobs)	3:10
6.	"Can't Hold Out Much Longer"	3:03

Side two
No.	Title	Length
1.	"Juke"	2:47
2.	"Mean Old World" (T-Bone Walker, re-written by Jacobs)	2:57
3.	"Off the Wall"	2:52
4.	"You Better Watch Yourself"	3:04
5.	"Blue Light"	3:14
6.	"Tell Me Mamma"	2:47

== Personnel ==
The following people contributed to the Best of Little Walter:

- Little Walter – lead vocals, harmonica
- Muddy Waters – guitar on "Juke" and "Can't Hold Out Much Longer"
- Jimmy Rogers – guitar on "Juke" and "Can't Hold Out Much Longer"
- David Myers – guitar
- Louis Myers – guitar
- Leonard Caston – guitar on "My Babe"
- Robert Lockwood Jr. – guitar on "My Babe"
- Willie Dixon – bass, producer
- Elgin Evans – drums on "Juke" and "Can't Hold Out Much Longer"
- Fred Below – drums
- Studs Terkel – sleeve notes

== Singles chart ==
The songs "Juke" and "My Babe" peaked at No. 1 on Billboard magazine's R&B Singles chart. "Sad Hours", "You're So Fine", and "Blues with a Feeling" made it to No. 2 on the same chart. "Last Night" and "Mean Old World" peaked at No. 6, "Off the Wall" and "You Better Watch Yourself" reached No. 8, and "Tell Me Mama" made it to No. 10.

== Release history ==
Region	Date	Label	Format	Catalog
United States	1958	Checker/Chess Records	LP	1428
United States	1967	Checker Records	LP	3004
United States	1988	MCA Records/Chess Records	LP	CH-9192
United States	1988	MCA Records/Chess Records	Cassette	CHC-9192
United States	1988	MCA Records/Chess Records	CD	CHD-9192
