= His Best (Little Walter album) =

Greatest hits album by Little Walter
- Released: June 17, 1997
- Recorded: May 12, 1952 – December 1960 in Chicago, Illinois
- Genre: Chicago blues
- Label: Chess/MCA
- Producer: Leonard Chess, Phil Chess, Willie Dixon, Andy McKaie
- Compiler: Andy McKaie, Billy Altman

Little Walter chronology
Confessin' the Blues (1996)	His Best (1997)	Little Walter & Otis Rush (2000)

Professional ratings
Review scores
Source	Rating
The Penguin Guide to Blues Recordings	4/4 stars

His Best is a greatest hits album by Chicago blues harmonica player Little Walter, released on June 17, 1997 by MCA and Chess Records as a part of The Chess 50th Anniversary Collection (see 1997 in music). The album is seen as the CD successor to the 1958 The Best of Little Walter and features ten of the songs from that album.

== Notable inclusions ==
=== "Juke" ===
"Juke" was Little Walter's first solo recording for Leonard Chess and reached No. 1 on the R&B Singles chart. A harmonica instrumental, it is Walter's most famous composition.

=== "Mean Old World" ===
Adapted from a 1942 T-Bone Walker song, "Mean Old World" became a No. 6 R&B chart success for Walter.

=== "Blues with a Feeling" ===
Walter's rendition reached No. 2 on the R&B Single chart and made the song a harmonica-blues standard. "Blues with a Feeling" was originally recorded by Rabon Tarrant with Jack McVea and His All Stars in 1947.

=== "My Babe" ===
Written by Willie Dixon, "My Babe" was Walter's second No. 1 on the R&B chart. It is perhaps Walter's best-known vocal performance.

=== "Roller Coaster" ===
The song "Roller Coaster" is an instrumental version of the 1955 Bo Diddley song "You Don't Love Me (You Don't Care)". The song reached No. 6 on the R&B chart.

=== "It Ain't Right" ===
Although "It Ain't Right" did not chart, it was later adapted by other musicians, including John Mayall & the Bluesbreakers, who recorded it as the closing track to their debut album Blues Breakers with Eric Clapton (Clapton has identified Little Walter as his favorite harmonica player).

=== "Key to the Highway" ===
Walter's rendition of "Key to the Highway" reached No. 6 and was his second to last charting single. His rendition became a blues standard, performed and recorded by a variety of artists. It was originally recorded by Charlie Segar in 1940.

=== "Just Your Fool" ===
One of Walter's later recordings, it was released in 1962. Buddy Johnson originally recorded the song as "I'm Just Your Fool" in 1953; in 2010, "Just Your Fool" became a popular single by Cyndi Lauper.

== Track listing ==
All tracks are written by Walter Jacobs, except where noted.

No.	Title	Vocal or Instrumental	Length
1.	"Juke"	Instrumental	2:47
2.	"Can't Hold Out Much Longer"	Vocal	3:03
3.	"Mean Old World" (T-Bone Walker)	Vocal	2:57
4.	"Sad Hours"	Instrumental	3:15
5.	"Tell Me Mama"	Vocal	2:47
6.	"Off the Wall"	Instrumental	2:52
7.	"Blues with a Feeling"	Vocal	3:10
8.	"You're So Fine"	Vocal	3:07
9.	"Too Late" (Willie Dixon, Charles Brown, John Phillips)	Vocal	2:44
10.	"Last Night"	Vocal	2:46
11.	"Mellow Down Easy" (Dixon)	Vocal	2:45
12.	"My Babe" (Dixon)	Vocal	2:44
13.	"Roller Coaster" (Ellas McDaniel)	Instrumental	2:56
14.	"Hate to See You Go"	Vocal	2:20
15.	"It Ain't Right"	Vocal	2:56
16.	"Boom, Boom Out Goes the Light" (Stan Lewis)	Vocal	2:54
17.	"Confessin' the Blues"	Vocal	3:06
18.	"Key to the Highway" (Big Bill Broonzy)	Vocal	2:48
19.	"Everything Gonna Be Alright"	Vocal	2:52
20.	"Just Your Fool"	Vocal	2:23

== Personnel ==
According to liner notes:

- Little Walter – vocals, harmonica
- Muddy Waters – guitar, slide guitar
- Jimmy Rogers – guitar
- Louis Myers – guitar
- David Myers – guitar
- Luther Tucker – guitar
- Robert Lockwood Jr. – guitar
- Leonard Caston – guitar on "My Babe"
- Bo Diddley – guitar on "Roller Coaster"
- Fred Robinson – guitar on "Just Your Fool"
- Jimmie Lee Robinson – guitar on "Confessin' the Blues", bass on "Just Your Fool"
- Willie Dixon – bass, production
- Otis Spann – piano
- Elgin Evans – drums
- Fred Below – drums
- George Hunter – drums on "Key to the Highway"
- Billy Stepney – drums on "Everything Gonna Be Alright"
- Leonard Chess – production
- Phil Chess – production
- Andy McKaie – reissue production, compilation
- Billy Altman – liner notes, compilation
- Erick Labson – digital remastering
- Michael Diehl – design, typography
- Mary Katherine Aldin – photography
- Ray Flerlage – photography
- Geary Chansley – photo research
