= List of blues standards =

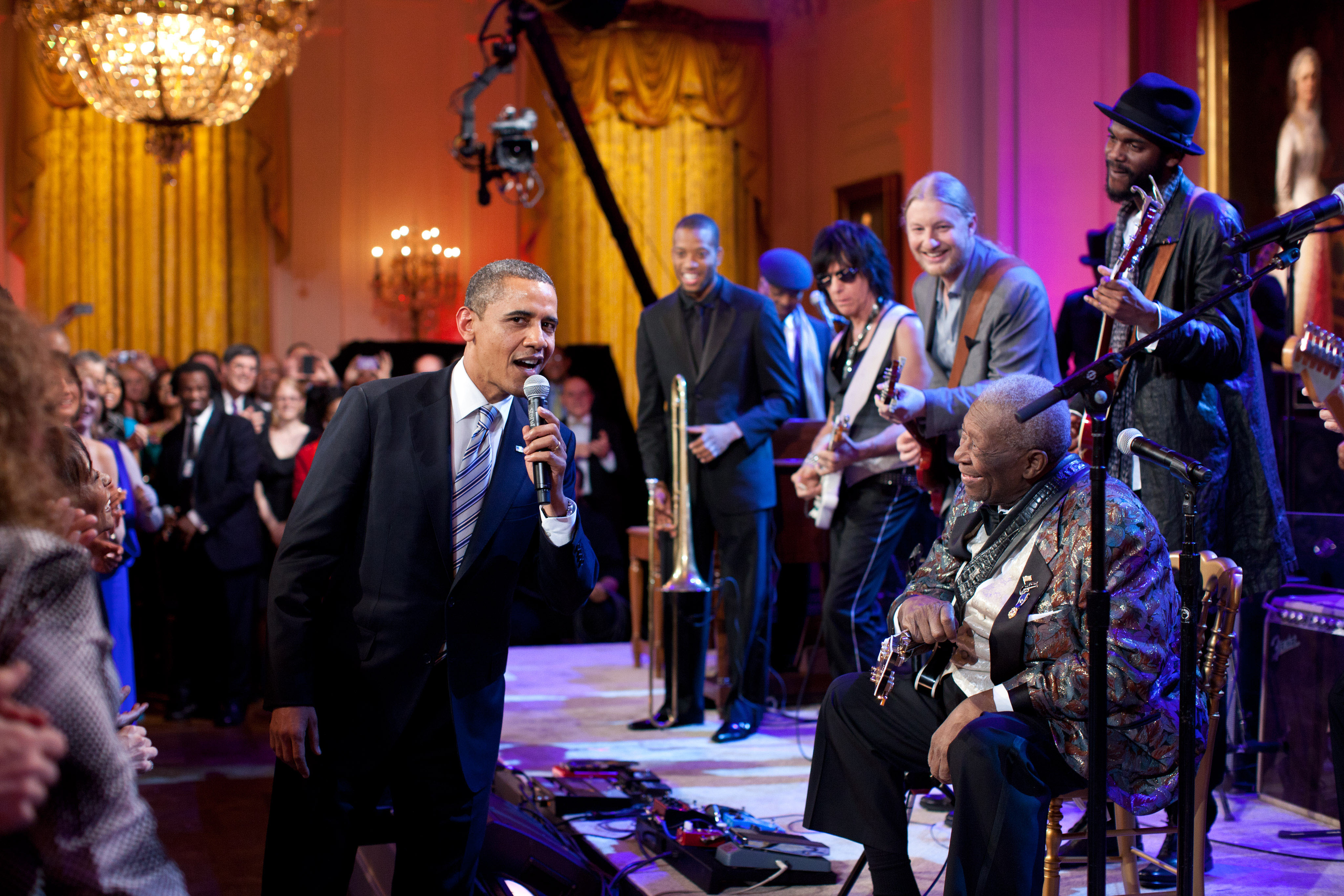
"Sweet Home Chicago" performed at the White House with Barack Obama joining B.B. King on the chorus

Blues standards are blues songs that have attained a high level of recognition due to having been widely performed and recorded. They represent the best known and most interpreted blues songs that are seen as standing the test of time. Blues standards come from different eras and styles, including ragtime-vaudeville, Delta blues, country blues, and urban blues from Chicago and the West Coast.

Many blues songs were developed in American folk music traditions and individual songwriters are sometimes unidentified. Blues historian Gerard Herzhaft noted:

In the case of very old blues songs, there is the constant recourse to oral tradition that conveyed the tune and even the song itself while at the same time evolving for several decades. This was long before the first recording. The fact that such blues are attributed to Charlie Patton, Blind Lemon Jefferson, and Blind Blake often means that they were the first to record them.

Compounding the problem is that, in the earlier days, many blues songs were not copyrighted. Later, the rights were claimed by those who recorded a subsequent version or were managers or record company owners. (Note: For example, "Crosscut Saw" is usually attributed to Tommy McClennan, whose 1941 recording was the first to be released (Tony Hollins, who recorded a version three months earlier that was unissued until 1992, has also been mentioned). In 1964, R. G. Ford, a Memphis, Tennessee, attorney, filed for the copyright in his own name after a group he represented recorded the tune. Ford is listed as the songwriter on records by Albert King (who popularized the song in 1967) and most subsequent releases. Some commentators, who may be unfamiliar with the song's origins, have referred to "Crosscut Saw" as "the R. G. Ford song".)

Nearly one half of the blues standards listed were first recorded in the pre-World War II acoustic blues era, before music publications tracked the sales of blues records. Many popular renditions, as reflected in the record charts, are more modern versions featuring electric instruments. For example, Robert Johnson and Tampa Red, who were the first to record the most blues standards on the list at four each, performed them as solo or duo acoustic performances. B.B. King and Muddy Waters, with the most standards on the charts at five each, used electric blues-ensemble arrangements.

Music journalist Richie Unterberger commented on the adaptability of blues: "From its inception, the blues has always responded to developments in popular music as a whole: the use of guitar and piano in American folk and gospel, the percussive rhythms of jazz, the lyrics of Tin Pan Alley, and the widespread use of amplification and electric instruments all helped shape the evolution of the blues." Blues standards that appeared on the main charts (Note: The singles charts on which the standards appear are: Billboard's Race/R&B/Soul/Black and Hot 100 singles charts; Australian singles charts; Canadian RPM singles charts; and UK Singles Charts. The individual citations are included in the "Refs" column entries.) in the 1960s and 1970s often had been recorded by rhythm and blues, soul, and rock musicians. Each song listed has been identified by five or more music writers as a blues standard. Spellings and titles may differ; the most common are used.

== List ==
List of blues standards, with title, first recorded by, year, charting single(s), and references
Title	First recorded by	Year	Charting single(s) by	Refs
"Ain't Nobody's Business"	Anna Meyers with the Original Memphis Five	1922	Jimmy Witherspoon (1949); H_{2}O featuring Billie (1996 as "Nobody's Business")	
"All Your Love (I Miss Loving)"	Otis Rush	1958	—	
"Baby, Please Don't Go"	Big Joe Williams	1935	The Orioles (1952); Them (1964); Amboy Dukes (1968); AC/DC (1975)	
"Baby What You Want Me to Do"	Jimmy Reed	1960	Jimmy Reed (1960); Etta James (1964)	
"Blues with a Feeling"	Rabon Tarrant	1947	Little Walter (1953)	
"Boom Boom"	John Lee Hooker	1962	John Lee Hooker (1962); The Animals (1964)	
"Born Under a Bad Sign"	Albert King	1967	Albert King (1967); William Bell (1969)	
"Caldonia"	Louis Jordan	1945	Louis Jordan (1945); Erskine Hawkins (1945); Sugar Chile Robinson (1949); James Brown (1964)	
"Catfish Blues"	Robert Petway	1941	Muddy Waters (1951 as "Still a Fool")	
"Crosscut Saw"	Tommy McClennan	1941	Albert King (1967)	
"Crossroads"	Robert Johnson	1936	Cream (1969)	
"Don't You Lie to Me"	Tampa Red	1940	—	
"Driftin' Blues"	Johnny Moore's Three Blazers	1945	Johnny Moore's Three Blazers (1945); Bobby Bland (1968)	
"Dust My Broom"	Robert Johnson	1936	Elmore James (1952)	
"Every Day I Have the Blues"	Pinetop Sparks	1935	Lowell Fulson (1950); Joe Williams (1952 & 1955); B.B. King (1955); Billy Stewart (1966)	
"Farther Up the Road"	Bobby Bland	1957	Bobby Bland (1957)	
"Five Long Years"	Eddie Boyd	1952	Eddie Boyd (1952); Junior Parker (1959)	
"Forty-Four"	Roosevelt Sykes	1929	—	
"Goin' Down Slow"	St. Louis Jimmy Oden	1941	Bobby Bland (1974)	
"Good Morning Little Schoolgirl"	Sonny Boy Williamson I	1937	Smokey Hogg (1950 as "Little School Girl")	
"Got My Mojo Working"	Muddy Waters	1956	Jimmy Smith (1966)	
"Help Me"	Sonny Boy Williamson II	1963	Sonny Boy Williamson II (1963)	
"Hide Away"	Freddie King	1961	Freddie King (1961); King Curtis (1964)	
"Hoochie Coochie Man"	Muddy Waters	1954	Muddy Waters (1954); Jimmy Smith (1966)	
"How Long Blues"	Leroy Carr & Scrapper Blackwell	1928	—	
"I Can't Quit You Baby"	Otis Rush	1956	Otis Rush (1956)	
"I'm a Man"	Bo Diddley	1955	Bo Diddley (1955); Muddy Waters (1955 as "Mannish Boy"); The Yardbirds (1965)	
"I'm Ready"	Muddy Waters	1954	Muddy Waters (1954)	
"It Hurts Me Too"	Tampa Red	1940	Tampa Red (1949 as "When Things Go Wrong"); Elmore James (1965)	
"Kansas City"	Little Willie Littlefield	1952	Wilbert Harrison (1959); Little Richard (1959); Hank Ballard & the Midnighters (1959); Trini Lopez (1963); James Brown (1967)	
"Key to the Highway"	Charlie Segar	1940	Little Walter (1958)	
"Killing Floor"	Howlin' Wolf	1964	—	
"Little Red Rooster"	Howlin' Wolf	1961	Sam Cooke (1963); The Rolling Stones (1964)	
"Mean Old World"	T-Bone Walker	1942	Little Walter (1953)	
"My Babe"	Little Walter	1955	Little Walter (1955); Roy Head (1966); Willie Mitchell (1969)	
"Nobody Knows You When You're Down and Out"	Bessie Smith	1929	Nina Simone (1960); Bobby Womack (1973 as "Nobody Wants You When You're Down and Out")	
"Reconsider Baby"	Lowell Fulson	1954	Lowell Fulson (1954)	
"Rock Me Baby"	Lil' Son Jackson	1950	B.B. King (1964)	
"Rollin' and Tumblin'"	Hambone Willie Newbern	1929	Canned Heat (1967); Johnny Winter (1969)	
"See See Rider"	Ma Rainey	1924	Bea Booze (1942); Chuck Willis (1957 as "C.C. Rider"); LaVern Baker (1962); Bobby Powell (1965); The Animals (1966)	
"Sitting on Top of the World"	Mississippi Sheiks	1930	—	
"The Sky Is Crying"	Elmore James	1960	Elmore James (1960)	
"Spoonful"	Howlin' Wolf	1960	Etta James & Harvey Fuqua (1961)	
"Stormy Monday"	T-Bone Walker	1948	T-Bone Walker (1948); Bobby Bland (1962); Latimore (1973)	
"Sugar Mama"	Tampa Red	1934	—	
"Sweet Home Chicago"	Robert Johnson	1936	Junior Parker (1958)	
"Sweet Little Angel"	Lucille Bogan	1930	B.B. King (1956)	
"That's All Right"	Jimmy Rogers	1950	—	
"The Things That I Used to Do"	Guitar Slim	1953	Guitar Slim (1953); James Brown (1964)	
"The Thrill Is Gone"	Roy Hawkins	1951	Roy Hawkins (1951); B.B. King (1970); Aretha Franklin (1970)	
"Trouble in Mind"	Bertha "Chippie" Hill	1926	Dinah Washington (1952); Nina Simone (1961)	
"Walkin' Blues"	Robert Johnson (Note: A "test disc" of "Walking Blues", recorded by Son House for Paramount Records in 1930, was not discovered until 1989: "[Robert] Johnson must have learned the lyrics from House's live performances ... Johnson straightened out House's somewhat idiosyncratic musical accompaniment, and in the process created a song that would, by and by, become a blues standard.")	1936	Muddy Waters (1948 as "I Feel Like Going Home")	
"Worried Life Blues"	Big Maceo	1941	Big Maceo (1945 as "Things Have Changed"); B.B. King (1970); Junior Parker (1970)	
"You've Got to Love Her with a Feeling"	Tampa Red	1938	Freddie King (1961)	
A dash ( — ) denotes a song that did not appear on a record chart.

== Bibliography ==
- Alexander, Amy (2003). Fifty Black Women Who Changed America. Kensington. ISBN 978-0758201850.
- Amicone, Michael (December 29, 2001). "Passings". Billboard. Vol. 113, no. 52. ISSN 0006-2510.
- Archard, Chuck (2005). Building Bass Lines: A Guide to Better Bass Lines for Bassists, Arrangers & Composers. Alfred Music. ISBN 978-0-88284-921-8.
- "Review". The Arkansas Historical Quarterly. 53. Arkansas Historical Association. 1994.
- "Review". The Atlanta Historical Bulletin. 21. Atlanta Historical Society. 1977.
- Arnett Ervin, Hazel (1999). African American Literary Criticism: 1773–2000. Twayne Publishers. ISBN 978-0-8057-1683-2.
- Barlow, William Brook (1983). Voices from the Heartland: A Cultural History of the Blues (PhD). Vol. 2. University of California Santa Cruz.
- Barnet, Richard D.; Nemerov, Bruce; Taylor, Mayo R (2004). The Story Behind the Song: 150 Songs that Chronicle the 20th Century. Greenwood Press. ISBN 978-0313319761.
- Barrett, David; Garcia, John (2010). "Blues Standards". Improvising Blues Harmonica. Mel Bay. ISBN 978-1-61065-276-6.
- Beaumont, Daniel E. (2011). Preachin' the Blues: The Life and Times of Son House. Oxford University Press. ISBN 978-0-19-539557-0.
- Bienstock, Richard (2020). Aerosmith, 50th Anniversary Updated Edition. Voyageur Press. ISBN 978-0760369364.
- "Review". Big City Blues. Vol. 5. Detroit Blues Magazine. 1999.
- "Chris Duarte Group". Big City Blues. Vol. 7. Detroit Blues Magazine. 2001.
- "Hot 100". Billboard. Vol. 76, no. 52. December 26, 1964. ISSN 0006-2510.
- "Hot 100". Billboard. Vol. 78, no. 42. October 15, 1966. ISSN 0006-2510.
- "Bubbling Under the Hot 100". Billboard. Vol. 81, no. 19. May 10, 1969. ISSN 0006-2510.
- "Review". BM Black Music & Jazz Review. Vol. 5. May 1982.
- "2002 Hall of Fame Inductees: Going Down Slow – St. Louis Jimmy Oden (Bluebird, 1941)". Blues Foundation. 2002.
- "2010 Hall of Fame Inductees: 'Key to the Highway' – Big Bill Broonzy (OKeh, 1941)". Blues Foundation. 2010.
- "2011 Hall of Fame Inductees: Five Long Years – Eddie Boyd (J.O.B., 1952)". Blues Foundation. 2011.
- "2016 Hall of Fame Inductees: Jimmy Rogers – "That's All Right" (Chess, 1950)". Blues Foundation. 2016.
- "Review". Blues Revue. No. 92–97. 2005. ISSN 1091-7543.
- "Reviews". Blues Suede News. Vol. 25–36. 1999. ISSN 1075-6647.
- "Review". Blues Suede News. Vol. 57–60. 2002. ISSN 1075-6647.
- "Review". Blues Unlimited. Vol. 148–149. 1988. ISSN 0006-5153.
- Bokelman, Marina; Evans, David (2022). Going Up the Country: Adventures in Blues Fieldwork in the 1960s. University Press of Mississippi. ISBN 978-1496842015.
- Booker, Vaughan A. (2022). Lift Every Voice and Swing. NYU Press. ISBN 978-1479892327.
- Boyd, Glenn (2012). Neil Young FAQ: Everything Left to Know About the Iconic Rocker. Backbeat Books. ISBN 978-1476813493.
- Brackett, Nathan, ed. (2004). The New Rolling Stone Album Guide (4th ed.). Simon & Schuster. ISBN 0-7432-0169-8.
- Brown, Geoff (2009). The Life of James Brown. Omnibus Press. ISBN 978-0857120328.
- Buffett, Jimmy (September 12, 1998). "Albert King: Powell Hall, St. Louis". Billboard. Vol. 10, no. 37. ISSN 0006-2510.
- Bukszpan, Daniel (2019). Woodstock: 50 Years of Peace and Music. Charlesbridge. ISBN 978-1623545314.
- Burrows, Cedric (2020). Rhetorical Crossover: The Black Presence in White Culture. University of Pittsburgh Press. ISBN 978-0822946205.
- "Biography". Cadence. Vol. 3. 1977. ISSN 0162-6973.
- "Biography". Cadence. Vol. 18, no. 7–12. 1992. ISSN 0162-6973.
- "Biography". Cadence. Vol. 24. 1998. ISSN 0162-6973.
- Chambers, Douglas Brent (2005). Murder at Montpelier. University Press of Mississippi. ISBN 978-1617034374.
- Charlesworth, Chris; Hanel, Ed (2010). The Who: Story und Songs kompakt [The Who: Story and Songs Compact] (in German). Bosworth Music. ISBN 978-0-85712-342-8.
- Charone, Barbara (2022). Access All Areas: A Backstage Pass Through 50 Years of Music and Culture. White Rabbit. ISBN 978-1474622288.
- Clapton, Eric (2007). Clapton: The Autobiography. Broadway Books. ISBN 978-0-7679-2536-5.
- Clark Hine, Darlene (2005). Black Women in America: Volume 1 – A to L. Oxford University Press. ISBN 978-0253327758.
- Collis, John (1998). The Story of Chess Records. Bloomsbury USA. ISBN 978-1582340050.
- Conforth, Bruce; Wardlow, Gayle Dean (2019). Up Jumped the Devil: The Real Life of Robert Johnson. Chicago Review Press. ISBN 978-1-64160-094-1.
- Corcoran, Michael (2017). All Over the Map: True Heroes of Texas Music. University of North Texas Press. ISBN 978-1574416688.
- Cotner, John Sidney (2001). Archetypes of Progressiveness in Rock, c.1966–1973. University of Wisconsin Madison.
- Cummings-Yeates, Rosalind (2014). Exploring Chicago Blues: Inside the Scene, Past and Present. The History Press. ISBN 978-1-62584-815-4.
- Danchin, Sebastian (2001). Earl Hooker: Blues Master. University Press of Mississippi. ISBN 978-1-57806-307-9.
- Danchin, Sebastian (2005). Blues Boy: The Life and Music of B. B. King. University Press of Mississippi. ISBN 978-1-60473-726-4.
- Dann, David (2019). Guitar King: Michael Bloomfield's Life in the Blues. University of Texas Press. ISBN 978-1-4773-1877-5.
- Darwen, Norman (1989). That's All Right (Album notes). Jimmy Rogers. Charly Records. CD RED 16.
- DeCurtis, Anthony; Henke, James; George-Warren, Holly, eds. (1992). The Rolling Stone Album Guide. Random House. ISBN 978-0-679-73729-2.
- Devi, Debra (2012). The Language of the Blues: From Alcorub to Zuzu. True Nature Books. ISBN 978-1-62407-185-0.
- Doggett, Peter (2012). Jimi Hendrix: The Complete Guide to His Music. Omnibus Press. ISBN 978-0857127105.
- Driggs, Frank; Haddix, Chuck (2006). Kansas City Jazz: From Ragtime to Bebop – A History. Oxford University Press. ISBN 978-0-19-530712-2.
- Eagle, Bob L.; LeBlanc, Eric S. (2013). Blues: A Regional Experience. ABC-CLIO. ISBN 978-0-313-34424-4.
- Edmondson, Jacqueline, ed. (2013). "Hooker, John Lee". Music in American Life: An Encyclopedia of the Songs, Styles, Stars, and Stories that Shaped our Culture. ABC-CLIO. ISBN 978-0-313-39348-8.
- Elledge, Jim (2018). The Boys of Fairy Town. Chicago Review Press. ISBN 978-1613739365.
- Emerson, Keith (2004). Pictures of an Exhibitionist. John Blake. ISBN 978-1-84454-053-2.
- "Tampa Red" [Tampa Red entry in Dictionary of the Blues: The Dictionaries of the Universal Encyclopedia]. Dictionnaire du Blues: Les Dictionnaires d'Universalis (in French). Encyclopaedia Universalis. 2019. ISBN 978-2-341-00208-0.
- Erlewine, Stephen Thomas, ed. (2001). "Biographies and Reviews". All Music Guide: The Definitive Guide to Popular Music. Backbeat Books. ISBN 978-0-87930-627-4.
- Erlewine, Stephen Thomas, ed. (2002). "Biographies and Reviews". All Music Guide: The Definitive Guide to Rock, Pop, and Soul. Backbeat Books. ISBN 978-0-87930-653-3.
- Erlewine, Stephen Thomas, ed. (2003). "Biographies and Reviews". All Music Guide to the Blues. Backbeat Books. ISBN 978-0-87930-736-3.
- Evans, David (1982). Big Road Blues: Tradition and Creativity in Folk Blues. University of California Press. ISBN 978-0-520-03484-6.
- Evans, David (2005). The NPR Curious Listener's Guide to Blues. Penguin Books. ISBN 978-0-399-53072-2.
- Evans, Mike; Kingsbury, Paul, eds. (2009). Woodstock: Three Days that Rocked the World. Sterling Publishing. ISBN 978-1-4027-6623-7.
- Farley, Charles (2011). Soul of the Man: Bobby "Blue" Bland. University Press of Mississippi. ISBN 978-1-60473-920-6.
- Field, Kim (2000). Harmonicas, Harps and Heavy Breathers: The Evolution of the People's Instrument. Cooper Square Press. ISBN 978-0-8154-1020-1.
- Finkelman, Paul, ed. (2009). "King B.B.". Encyclopedia of African American History, 1896 to the Present. Vol. 3. Oxford University Press. ISBN 978-0195167795.
- Friedland, Ed (2004). Bass Grooves: Develop Your Groove. Hal Leonard. ISBN 978-1-61774-509-6.
- Friedwald, Will (2010). A Biographical Guide to the Great Jazz and Pop Singers. Pantheon Books. ISBN 978-0307379894.
- Ford, Robert Jr. (July 21, 1979). "Tribute to Muddy Waters, Radio City Music Hall". Billboard. Vol. 51, no. 29. ISSN 0006-2510.
- Garon, Paul (2003). The Devil's Son-in-Law: The Story of Peetie Wheatstraw and His Songs. Studio Vista. ISBN 978-0289702123.
- Gee, Henry (2013). The Accidental Species: Misunderstandings of Human Evolution. University of Chicago Press. ISBN 978-0-226-04498-9.
- George-Warren, Holly; Pareles, Jon, eds. (1995). "Artists and reviews". The New Rolling Stone Encyclopdeia of Rock & Roll (2nd ed.). Simon & Schuster. ISBN 978-0684810447.
- Glover, Tony; Dirks, Scott; Gaines, Ward (2002). Blues with a Feeling: The Little Walter Story. Routledge. ISBN 0-415-93710-8.
- Goldberg, Daniel (September 6, 1969). "King of the Blues Courts Fans". Billboard. Vol. 81, no. 36. ISSN 0006-2510.
- Grazian, David (2003). Blue Chicago: The Search for Authenticity in Urban Blues Clubs. University of Chicago Press. ISBN 0-226-30568-6.
- Gregory, Georgina (2019). Boy Bands and the Performance of Pop Masculinity. Routledge. ISBN 978-0-429-02757-4.
- "Review". Keyboard. Vol. 33–34. Guitar Player. 2007. ISSN 0730-0158.
- Guralnick, Peter (1982). The Listener's Guide to the Blues. Facts on File. ISBN 978-0-87196-567-7.
- Gussow, Adam (2007). Journeyman's Road: Modern Blues Lives from Faulkner's Mississippi to Post-9/11 New York. University of Tennessee Press. ISBN 978-1572335691.
- Deep Blues: 57 Essential Blues Standards. Hal Leonard. 1996. ISBN 978-0-7935-6483-5.
- Blues Standards: Easy Piano 18 Songs. Hal Leonard. 2005. ISBN 978-0-634-09260-2.
- Blues Standards: Volume 13. Hal Leonard. 2013. ISBN 978-1-4234-9648-9.
- Hall, John R.; Grindstaff, Laura; Lo, Ming-Cheng, eds. (2010). Handbook of Cultural Sociology. Routledge. ISBN 978-0-203-89137-7.
- Hardy, Phil; Laing, Dave (1995). The Da Capo Companion to 20th-Century Popular Music. Da Capo Press. ISBN 978-0571171484.
- Hawkins, Martin (2016). Slim Harpo: Blues King Bee of Baton Rouge. Louisiana State University Press. ISBN 978-0-8071-6453-2.
- Hay, Fred J., ed. (2005). Goin' Back to Sweet Memphis: Conversations with the Blues. University of Georgia Press. ISBN 978-0-8203-2732-7.
- Herzhaft, Gerard (1992). "Blues Standards". Encyclopedia of the Blues. University of Arkansas Press. ISBN 978-1-55728-252-1.
- Hildebrand, Lee (1994). Stars of Soul and Rhythm & Blues: Top Recording Artists and Showstopping Performers, from Memphis and Motown to Now. Watson-Guptill. ISBN 978-0823076338.
- Hischak, Thomas S. (2002). The Tin Pan Alley Song Encyclopedia. Greenwood Publishing Group. ISBN 978-0313319921.
- Hjort, Christopher (2007). Strange Brew: Eric Clapton and the British Blues Boom. Jawbone Press. ISBN 978-1906002008.
- Hoffmann, Frank (2005). Rhythm and Blues, Rap, and Hip-hop. Infobase Publishing. ISBN 978-0-8160-6980-4.
- Huxley, Martin (1995). Aerosmith: The Fall and the Rise of Rock's Greatest Band. Macmillan. ISBN 978-0-312-11737-5.
- "Blues Star Albert King Dies After Heart Attack". Jet. Vol. 83. January 11, 1993. ISSN 0021-5996.
- "Review". Journal of American Folklore. American Folklore Society. 1973. ISSN 0021-8715.
- "Review". Journal of American Folklore. American Folklore Society. 1978. ISSN 0021-8715.
- Kemp, Mark (2004). Dixie Lullaby: A Story of Music, Race, and New Beginnings in a New South. Free Press. ISBN 978-0743237949.
- Kingwell, Mark (2020). On Risk. Biblioasis. ISBN 978-1771963930.
- Klein, Josh (March 2001). "The Pumpkins' Long Good-Bye". Spin. Vol. 17, no. 3.
- Komara, Edward, ed. (2005). "Artist and song entries". Encyclopedia of the Blues. Psychology Press. ISBN 978-0-415-92699-7.
- Larkin, Colin (2013). "Artist and song entries". The Virgin Encyclopedia of the Blues. Random House. ISBN 978-1-4481-3274-4.
- Woodstock at 50: Three Amazing Days of Peace and Music. Time Life. 2009.
- "Review". Living Blues. No. 57–66. 1983. ISSN 0024-5232.
- "Review". Living Blues. No. 73–79. 1987. ISSN 0024-5232.
- "Review". Living Blues. No. 95–100. Center for the Study of Southern Culture, University of Mississippi. 1991. ISSN 0024-5232.
- "Review". Living Blues. No. 125–130. Center for the Study of Southern Culture, University of Mississippi. 1996. ISSN 0024-5232.
- "Review". Living Blues. No. 176–181. Center for the Study of Southern Culture, University of Mississippi. 2005. ISSN 0024-5232.
- "Review". Living Blues. No. 194–198. Center for the Study of Southern Culture, University of Mississippi. 2008. ISSN 0024-5232.
- Luhrssen, David; Larson, Michael (2017). Encyclopedia of Classic Rock. ABC-CLIO. ISBN 978-1440835148.
- Malvinni, David (2013). Grateful Dead and the Art of Rock Improvisation. Scarecrow Press. ISBN 978-0-8108-8255-3.
- Manheim, Steven (2019). Blues Musicians of the Mississippi Delta. Arcadia Publishing. ISBN 978-1-4671-0309-1.
- Mansfield, Richard (1998). Studio Basics: What You Should Know Before Entering the Recording Studio. Watson-Guptill. ISBN 978-0823084883.
- Marcus, Greil (2011). When That Rough God Goes Riding: Listening to Van Morrison. PublicAffairs. ISBN 978-1-61039-018-7.
- Mark, Rebecca; Vaughan, Rob, eds. (2004). The South. Greenwood Press. ISBN 0-313-32805-6.
- Marks, Ian D.; McIntyre, Iain (2010). Wild About You: The Sixties Explosion in Australia and New Zealand. >: Verse Chorus Press. ISBN 978-1-891241-28-4.
- Marsh, Dave (1999). The Heart of Rock & Soul: The 1001 Greatest Singles Ever Made. Da Capo Press. ISBN 978-0-306-80901-9.
- Marshall, Wolf (2008). The Wold Marshall Guitar Method: Advsnced Concepts and Techniques. Hal Leonard.
- McHugh, Rich (2003). The Rough Guide to Chicago. Rough Guides. ISBN 978-1858287553.
- McIntyre, Iain, ed. (2006). Tomorrow Is Today: Australia in the Psychedelic Era, 1966–1970. >: Wakefield Press. ISBN 978-1-86254-697-4.
- McKittrick, Christopher (2020). Somewhere You Feel Free: Tom Petty and Los Angeles. Post Hill Press. ISBN 978-1642935127.
- McParland, Robert (2019). The Rock Music Imagination. Lexington Books. ISBN 978-1-4985-8852-2.
- Michelsen, Anders; Tygstrup, Frederik, eds. (2015). Socioaesthetics: Ambience – Imaginary. Leiden, Netherlands: Brill Publishers. ISBN 978-90-04-24627-0.
- Millard, Andre, ed. (2004). The Electric Guitar: A History of an American Icon. Johns Hopkins University Press. ISBN 0-8018-7862-4.
- Milward, John (2013). Crossroads: How the Blues Shaped Rock 'n' Roll (and Rock Saved the Blues). UPNE. ISBN 978-1-55553-744-9.
- Morris, Chris (July 7, 2001). "John Lee Hooker Gone but Not Forgotten". Billboard. Vol. 113, no. 27. ISSN 0006-2510.
- Morris, Chris (May 3, 2003). "Genre-Breaking Artist Dies at 70". Billboard. Vol. 115, no. 18. ISSN 0006-2510.
- Moseley, Willie G. (1996). Executive Rock: A Fan's Perspective on the Evolution of Popular Music Since 1950. Vintage Guitar Books. ISBN 978-1-884883-04-0.
- Moskowitz, David (2010). The Words and Music of Jimi Hendrix. ABC-CLIO. ISBN 978-0-313-37592-7.
- Murphy, Keith (December 2008). "Volume: Ultimate 45s – Chess Records". Vibe. Vol. 16, no. 21. ISSN 1070-4701.
- Murray, Charles Shaar (1991). Crosstown Traffic. St. Martin's Press. ISBN 978-0-312-06324-5.
- Murray, Charles Shaar (2013). Boogie Man: The Adventures of John Lee Hooker in the American Twentieth Century. St. Martin's Press. ISBN 978-1466852365.
- Nadel, Alan (1988). Invisible Criticism: Ralph Ellison and the American Canon. University of Iowa Press. ISBN 0-87745-190-7.
- "Review". New York. Vol. 33. 2000. ISSN 0028-7369.
- Noad, Frederick M. (2002). The Complete Idiot's Guide to Playing the Guitar (2nd ed.). Alpha. ISBN 978-0028642444.
- Obrecht, Jas (2000). Rollin' and Tumblin': The Postwar Blues Guitarists. Hal Leonard. ISBN 978-0-87930-613-7.
- Obrecht, Jas (2018). Stone Free: Jimi Hendrix in London, September 1966 – June 1967. UNC Press Books. ISBN 978-1469647074.
- "Reviews". Oklahoma Today. Vol. 41. Oklahoma Planning and Resources Board. 1999. ISSN 0030-1892.
- Oliver, Paul (1964). "Reviews". Jazz Press. Vol. 3–4.
- Oliver, Paul (1968). Screening the Blues: Aspects of the Blues Tradition. Da Capo Press. ISBN 978-0-306-80344-4.
- Oliver, Paul (2001). Yonder Come the Blues: The Evolution of a Genre. Cambridge University Press. ISBN 978-0-521-78777-2.
- Olsson, Bengt (1970). Memphis Blues. Studio Vista. ISBN 978-0-289-70033-4.
- O'Neal, Jim (1984). "1984 Hall of Fame Inductees: Got My Mojo Working – Muddy Waters (Chess album track, 1960)". Blues Foundation.
- O'Neal, Jim (1993). "1993 Hall of Fame Inductees: Reconsider Baby – Lowell Fulson (Checker, 1954)". Blues Foundation.
- O'Neal, Jim; van Singel, Amy (2002). The Voice of the Blues: Classic Interviews from Living Blues Magazine. Routledge. ISBN 978-0-415-93654-5.
- Palmer, Robert (1981). Deep Blues. Penguin Books. ISBN 978-0-14-006223-6.
- Parrish, Tim (2001). Walking Blues: Making Americans from Emerson to Elvis. University of Massachusetts Press. ISBN 978-1-55849-302-5.
- Pegg, Bruce (2013). Brown Eyed Handsome Man: The Life and Hard Times of Chuck Berry. Routledge. ISBN 978-1-135-35684-2.
- Pellegrino, Anthony Michael, ed. (2012). Let the Music Play!: Harnessing the Power of Music. IAP. ISBN 978-1-61735-792-3.
- Perone, James E. (2019). Listen to the Blues!: Exploring a Musical Genre. ABC-CLIO. ISBN 978-1-4408-6614-2.
- Perone, James E. (2021). Listen to Soul!: Exploring a Musical Genre. ABC-CLIO. ISBN 978-1440875267.
- "Review". Primo Times. No. 72–82. 1977.
- Rees, Dafydd; Crampton, Luke (1999). Rock Stars Encyclopedia. DK. ISBN 978-0-7894-4613-8.
- Riesman, Bob (2011). I Feel So Good: The Life and Times of Big Bill Broonzy. University of Chicago Press. ISBN 978-0-226-71745-6.
- Rodriguez, Robert (2010). Fab Four FAQ 2.0: The Beatles' Solo Years, 1970–1980. Hal Leonard. ISBN 978-0-87930-968-8.
- Rogers, Matt (2022). Goodnight Boogie: A Tale of Guns, Wolves & The Blues of Hound Dog Taylor. BMG Books. ISBN 978-1947026971.
- Rothwell, Fred (2001). Long Distance Information: Chuck Berry's Recorded Legacy. Music Mentor Books. ISBN 978-0-9519888-2-4.
- Russo, Greg (1994). Uncanned! The Best of Canned Heat (Compilation booklet). Canned Heat. EMI Records. E2 29165.
- Russo, Greg; Hinman, Doug (2001). Ultimate! (Box set booklet). The Yardbirds. Rhino Records. R2 79825.
- Sammon, Marty (2015). Hal Leonard Blues Keyboard Method. Hal Leonard. ISBN 978-1-4950-3109-0.
- Sandage, Scott A. (2009). Born Losers: A History of Failure in America. Harvard University Press. ISBN 978-0-674-04305-3.
- Santelli, Robert (2001). The Big Book of Blues: A Biographical Encyclopedia. Penguin Books. ISBN 978-0-14-100145-6.
- Schinder, Scott; Schwartz, Andy (2008). Icons of Rock: An Encyclopedia of the Legends Who Changed Music Forever. Greenwood Press. ISBN 978-0-313-33845-8.
- Scott, Paul (2015). Motherless Child: The Definitive Biography of Eric Clapton. Headline Publishing Group. ISBN 978-1-4722-1272-6.
- Segrest, James; Hoffman, Mark (2004). Moanin' at Midnight: The Life and Times of Howlin' Wolf. Pantheon Books. ISBN 978-0-375-42246-1.
- Shapiro, Harry (1992). Eric Clapton: Lost in the Blues. Hatchette Book Group. ISBN 978-0306804809.
- Shapiro, Harry; Heatley, Michael; Mayer, Roger (2009). Jimi Hendrix Gear. Voyageur Press. ISBN 978-1-61060-421-5.
- Simmons, Earl (n.d.). "Various Artists: Trouble in Mind: Original Blues Standards". AllMusic.
- "Reviews". Sing Out!. 1993. ISSN 0037-5624.
- Skinner Sawyers, June (1991). Chicago Portraits: Biographies of 250 Famous Chicagoans. Loyola University Press. ISBN 978-0-8294-0701-3.
- Smith, Matt (2013). Basic Blues Guitar Method, Book 4. Alfred Music. ISBN 978-1-4574-1527-2.
- Sokolow, Fred (1998). The Roots of Electric Blues Guitar. Hal Leonard. ISBN 978-0793577309.
- Sokolow, Fred (2014). Blues Banjo: Lessons, Licks, Riffs, Songs & More. Hal Leonard. ISBN 978-1-4950-0947-1.
- Southern, Eileen (1997). The Music of Black Americans: A History. W. W. Norton. ISBN 978-0-393-03843-9.
- Spitz, Bob (1991). Dylan: A Biography. W. W. Norton. ISBN 978-0393353105.
- Spitz, Bob (2021). Led Zeppelin: The Biography. Penguin Press. ISBN 978-0399562426.
- Stang, Aaron, ed. (1998). 21st Century Guitar Song: Trax 3. Alfred Music. ISBN 978-0-7692-6020-4.
- Steinberg, Jesse R. (2012). Blues – Philosophy for Everyone: Thinking Deep About Feeling Low. John Wiley & Sons. ISBN 978-1118153260.
- Sullivan, Steve (2017). "Biographies". Encyclopedia of Great Popular Song Recordings. Vol. 3 & 4. Rowman & Littlefield. ISBN 978-1-4422-5448-0.
- Swenson, John (1999). The Rolling Stone Jazz and Blues Album Guide. Random House. ISBN 978-0679768739.
- Szatmary, David P. (2000). Rockin' in Time: A Social History of Rock-and-Roll (4th ed.). Prentice Hall. OCLC 1151154397.
- Talevski, Nick (1998). The Unofficial Encyclopedia of the Rock and Roll Hall of Fame. Greenwood Press. ISBN 978-0-313-30032-5.
- Talevski, Nick (2010). Rock Obituaries: Knocking On Heaven's Door. Omnibus Press. ISBN 978-0-85712-117-2.
- Tamarkin, Jeff (2003). Got a Revolution! The Turbulent Flight of Jefferson Airplane. Atria Books. ISBN 978-0671034030.
- Tolinski, Brad; di Perna, Alan (2016). Play It Loud: An Epic History of the Style, Sound, and Revolution of the Electric Guitar. Doubleday. ISBN 978-0385541008.
- Tracy, Steven Carl (1999). Write Me a Few of Your Lines: A Blues Reader. University of Massachusetts Press. ISBN 978-1-55849-206-6.
- Tracy, Steven Carl (2015). Hot Music, Ragmentation, and the Bluing of American Literature. University of Alabama Press. ISBN 978-0817318659.
- "Review". UC Davis Law Review. 40 (3). University of California, Davis School of Law. 2006. ISSN 0197-4564.
- Unterberger, Richie; Hicks, Samb (1999). Music USA: The Rough Guide. Rough Guides. ISBN 978-1-85828-421-7.
- Unterberger, Richie (1996). "Modern Electric Blues". In Erlewine, Michael; Bogdanov, Vladimir; Woodstra, Chris; Koda, Cub (eds.). All Music Guide to the Blues. Miller Freeman Books. ISBN 978-0-87930-424-9.
- Urban, Michael E.; Evdokimov, Andrei (2004). Russia Gets the Blues: Music, Culture, and Community in Unsettled Times. Cornell University Press. ISBN 978-0801442292.
- Verna, Paul (February 25, 1995). "Winwood Gets 'Finer' with Island Boxed Set". Billboard. Vol. 107, no. 8. ISSN 0006-2510.
- Walker, Clinton (2011). Highway to Hell: The Life and Death of AC/DC Legend Bon Scott. Verse Chorus Press. ISBN 978-1-891241-86-4.
- Weissman, Dick (2005). Blues. Facts on File. ISBN 0-8160-5310-3.
- Wheatley, JC, ed. (2013). British Beat Explosion: Rock and Roll Island. Aurora Metro Books. ISBN 978-1-906582-52-4.
- Whitburn, Joel (1988). Top R&B Singles 1942–1988. Record Research. ISBN 978-0-89820-068-3.
- Whitburn, Joel (2008). Joel Whitburn Presents: Across the Charts – The 1960s. Record Research. ISBN 978-0898201758.
- Whiteis, David (2013). Southern Soul-Blues. University of Illinois Press. ISBN 978-0-252-09477-4.
- Whiteis, David (2019). Blues Legacy: Tradition and Innovation in Chicago. University of Illinois Press. ISBN 978-0-252-09477-4.
- Whiteley, Sheila (2003). The Space Between the Notes: Rock and the Counter-Culture. Routledge. ISBN 978-0415068161.
- Wiley, Ralph (1993). What Black People Should Do Now: Dispatches from Near the Vanguard. One World/Ballantine Books. ISBN 978-0-345-38045-6.
- Williamson, Nigel (2007a). The Rough Guide to Led Zeppelin. Rough Guides. ISBN 978-1-84353-841-7.
- Williamson, Nigel (2007b). The Rough Guide to the Blues. Rough Guides. ISBN 978-1843535195.
- Wirt, John (2014). Huey "Piano" Smith and the Rocking Pneumonia Blues. Louisiana State University Press. ISBN 978-0-8071-5295-9.
- The Riffology. Wise Publications. 2010. ISBN 978-1787590588.
- Really Easy Piano: Blues. Wise Publications. 2011. ISBN 978-1780382418.
- Wyman, Bill; Havers, Richard (2001). Bill Wyman's Blues Odyssey. DK. ISBN 978-0-7894-8046-0.
- Wynne, Ben (2007). Mississippi. Interlink Books. ISBN 978-1-56656-666-7.
- Wynne, Ben (2009). "King, B.B.". Encyclopedia of African American History: 5-Volume Set. Oxford University Press. ISBN 978-0-19-516779-5.
- Yamin, Eli (2018). So You Want to Sing the Blues: A Guide for Performers. Rowman & Littlefield. ISBN 978-1442267039. "Catherine Russell offers this list."
