= Blues with a Feeling =

Blues standard popularized by Little Walter

Single by Rabon Tarrant with Jack McVea and His Door Openers
- A-side: "Slowly Goin' Crazy Blues"
- Released: After May 10, 1947
- Recorded: Los Angeles, 1947
- Genre: Jump blues
- Length: 3:00
- Label: Black & White
- Songwriter: Rabon Tarrant

"Blues with a Feeling" is a blues song written and first recorded by Rabon Tarrant with Jack McVea and His All Stars in 1947, as the B-side of "Slowly Goin' Crazy Blues". Although the original release was commercially unsuccessful, the song later became an important hit for Little Walter, with whom it is usually identified.

Walter transformed the tune from Tarrant's jump blues-oriented style to a Chicago blues harmonica classic. It became a blues standard and an important piece for blues harp players.

== Original song ==
Rabon Tarrant, a drummer with saxophone player Jack McVea's band, wrote "Blues with a Feeling" and also provided the vocals. The song was performed as a mid-tempo twelve-bar jump blues that features sax and trumpet soloing over a strong backbeat. The opening verses reflect on lost love:

Blues with a feeling, that's what I have today
Blues with a feeling, that's what I have today
Gonna find my baby, yes if it takes all night and day.

In its "Advance Record Releases" column, Billboard describes the single on Black & White Records as "slowly goin'". The notice appears on May 10, 1947, about one month after McVea's number two hit "Open the Door Richard" exited the chart. However, "Blues with a Feeling" did not reach the chart.

== Little Walter rendition ==
"Blues with a Feeling"

Single by Little Walter
- B-side: "Quarter to Twelve"
- Released: August 1953
- Recorded: July 23, 1953
- Studio: Universal, Chicago, Illinois
- Genre: Chicago blues; Blues
- Length: 3:06
- Label: Checker (Checker 785)
- Songwriter: Rabon Tarrant
- Producers: Leonard Chess; Phil Chess

Little Walter singles chronology
"Off the Wall" (1953)	"Blues with a Feeling" (1953)	"You're So Fine" (1953)

Little Walter follows much of McVea's verses and arrangement, however, he updates the song in his own style. It is performed as a slow blues with Walter playing a distinctive harp intro and accompaniment to his vocals. When Little Walter recorded "Blues with a Feeling" in Chicago on July 23, 1953, he was backed by one of the classic Chicago blues bands. Sometimes known as the Aces, Dave Myers and Louis Myers (or possibly Jimmy Rogers) provide guitars, with Willie Dixon on upright bass, and Fred Below on drums. Walter biographer Tony Glover notes the "nice interplay between the guitar and the harp ... with Below providing momentum with his shuffling brush work, and an effective stop-time vocal verse from Walter near the end".

Checker Records, a Chess Records subsidiary that issued most of Walter's recordings, released the song as a single in 1953. According to Glover, Checker choose the second of two takes, largely due to a faulty audio connection which affected the first. The single debuted on two of Billboard's R&B charts on October 10, 1953, eventually reaching number two on the Juke Box chart and number six on the Best Seller chart.

The song is found on many Little Walter compilations, including his first, Best of Little Walter (1958), the comprehensive The Essential Little Walter (1993), and, as a part of The Chess 50th Anniversary Collection, His Best (1997). An alternate take, recorded in September 1953, was released on Blues with a Feeling: Chess Collectables, Vol. 3 (1995). Unlike most of Walter's alternate takes, this later recording differs little from the original.

== Legacy ==
Little Walter's adaptation of "Blues with a Feeling" has been identified as a blues standard and a "necessary passage of every beginning harmonica player" by blues historian Gérard Herzhaft. Music writer Mary Katherine Aldin notes that it "has been cited by a number of his imitators as the song that inspired them to take up harmonica". Harmonica instructional book author Winslow Yerxa identifies it as one of the best-known "tried-and-true harmonica tunes" and one of six blues favorites.

Although "Blues with a Feeling" was written and originally performed and recorded by Tarrant, Little Walter usually receives the credit for the tune. Many subsequent releases also credit him, leading Aldin to call it "maybe Walter's most covered song".
