= Jimmy Rogers (album) =

Compilation album by Jimmy Rogers
- Released: 1984
- Recorded: 1950–1960
- Genre: Blues
- Label: Chess Records
- Producer: Leonard Chess and Phil Chess

Jimmy Rogers is a double compilation album of the blues guitarist Jimmy Rogers. The album was published as part of the Chess Masters series.

== Track listing ==
All tracks written by Jimmy Rogers. Published by Arc Music, BMI.

=== Side one ===
1. "Left Me with a Broken Heart" (1953) – 2:55
2. "Blues All Day Long" (1954) – 3:00
3. "Today Today Blues (1950)" – 3:07
4. "The World's in a Tangle" (1951) – 2:55
5. "She Loves Another Man" (1951) – 2:50
6. "Hard Working Man" (1951) – 2:21

=== Side two ===
1. "Chance to Love" (1951) – 2:20
2. "My Little Machine" (1951) – 3:06
3. "Mistreated Baby" (1952) – 2:25
4. "What's the Matter" (1952) – 3:10
5. "You're the One" (1955) – 2:26
6. "If It Ain't Me" (1956) – 2:00

=== Side three ===
1. "One Kiss" (1957) – 2:45
2. "I Can't Believe" (1957)- 3:00
3. "What Have I Done" (1957) – 2:42
4. "My Baby Don't Love Me No More" (1957) – 2:20
5. "Trace of You" (1957) – 2:32
6. "Don't You Know My Baby" (1956) – 2:31

=== Side four ===
1. "Crying Shame" (1952) – 2:47
2. "Give Love Another Chance" (1952) – 2:58
3. "This Has Never Been" (1956) – 4:29
4. "Rock This House" (1959) – 2:53
5. "My Last Meal" (1959) – 3:00
6. "You Don't know" (1960) – 2:41
7. "Can't Keep from Worrying" (1960) – 2:29

== Personnel ==
- Jimmy Rogers – vocals, guitar on all tracks except "Give Love Another Chance", on which Rogers only plays guitar.
- A. J. Gladys – drums
- Big-Crawford – bass
- Bob Woodfork – guitar
- Eddie Ware – piano, vocal on "Give love Another Chance"
- Elgin Evans – drums
- Ernest Cotton – tenor sax
- Francis Clay – drums
- Fred Below – drums
- 'Fred Robertson' – guitar (actually Freddy Robinson)
- George Hunter – drums
- Henry Gray – piano
- Joe Young – guitar
- Johnny Jones – piano
- J. T. Brown – tenor sax
- Little Walter – harp, guitar on "Hard Working Man"
- Luther Tucker – guitar
- Muddy Waters – guitar
- Odie Payne – drums
- Otis Spann – piano
- S. P. Leary – drums
- Walter Horton – harp
- Wayne Bennett – guitar
- Willie Dixon – bass

== Notes and sources ==
- Track Listings and Credits as they appear on Chess CH-2-9211
