= I'm Ready (Muddy Waters song) =

Blues standard written by Willie Dixon

Single by Muddy Waters
- B-side: "I Don't Know Why"
- Released: October 27, 1954
- Recorded: Chicago, September 1, 1954
- Genre: Blues
- Length: 3:03
- Label: Chess
- Songwriter: Willie Dixon
- Producers: Leonard Chess, Phil Chess

Muddy Waters singles chronology
"Just Make Love To Me" (1954)	"I'm Ready" (1954)	"Natural Born Lover" / "Loving Man" (1954)

"I'm Ready" is a blues song written by Willie Dixon and first recorded by Muddy Waters in 1954. It was a hit, spending nine weeks on the Billboard R&B chart where it reached number four. The song became a blues standard and has been compared to "Hoochie Coochie Man", the standard also written by Dixon that Waters recorded earlier in 1954.

== Composition and recording ==
"I'm Ready" was inspired by a comment by Muddy Waters prior to a gig, when harmonica player Willie Foster visited him at home. As Foster recalled,

I knocked on the door, and he was shaving. He said "You here? I told you to come tomorrow." I said, "Yeah, but I'm here today." While drinking, Waters ribbed Foster for bringing a suitcase for a weekend. He said, "I mean you ready!" And I said, "Ready as anybody can be!" He popped his finger and turned to Willie Dixon and said, "Are you thinking what I'm thinking? That's a record, man!"

Dixon proceeded to write a song and "I'm Ready" was completed within about three days. The lyrics continue the use of swagger and supernatural imagery found in Dixon's "Hoochie Coochie Man", which Waters recorded in January 1954:

I gotta ax handle pistol, on a graveyard frame
That shoots tombstone bullets, wearing balls and chain
I'm drinkin' TNT, smokin' dynamite
I hope some screwball, start a fight

In addition to the lyrical theme, "I'm Ready" incorporates a stop-time sixteen-bar structure analogous to "Hoochie Coochie Man". The song was recorded September 1, 1954, by Waters on vocal and guitar, accompanied by Little Walter on chromatic harmonica, Jimmy Rogers on guitar, Otis Spann on piano, Willie Dixon on bass, and Fred Below on drums.

== Releases ==
Chess Records issued the song as single in late 1954, with "I Don't Know Why" as the B-side. In 1958, it was included on Muddy Waters' first album, The Best of Muddy Waters (1958).

Muddy Waters later re-recorded the song for his albums Fathers and Sons (1969) and The London Muddy Waters Sessions (1971). In 1978, he re-recorded it again as the title track to his album I'm Ready. The album, which was produced by Johnny Winter, earned Waters a Grammy Award in 1978.
