= Blues Blues Blues =

Studio album by the Jimmy Rogers All-Stars
- Released: January 1999
- Genre: Blues, Chicago blues
- Label: Atlantic
- Producer: John Koenig, Elaine Koenig

The Jimmy Rogers All-Stars chronology
The Complete Chess Recordings (1997)	Blues Blues Blues (1999)

Blues Blues Blues is an album credited to the Jimmy Rogers All-Stars. It was released in January 1999, just over a year after Jimmy Rogers's death. The album peaked at No. 1 on the UK Jazz & Blues Albums Chart. Mick Jagger, one of the album's many featured musicians, considered Rogers to be the originator of electric blues.

== Production ==
The album was produced by John and Elaine Koenig. Many of the musicians were encouraged to participate by Ahmet Ertegun who served as executive producer. "Ev'ry Day I Have the Blues" is a version of the Memphis Slim song. Taj Mahal sang and played harmonica on the cover of "Bright Lights Big City". Jagger, on the cover of "Don't Start Me to Talkin'", included a verse that was excised from the original 1955 Sonny Boy Williamson II version. Carey Bell and Kim Wilson played harmonica on some of the tracks. Johnnie Johnson contributed on piano.

== Critical reception ==
Professional ratings
Review scores
Source	Rating
AllMusic	4/5 stars
The Atlanta Journal-Constitution	A
Calgary Herald	3.5/5 stars
Dayton Daily News	A
Edmonton Journal	3.5/5 stars
The Encyclopedia of Popular Music	4/5 stars
Los Angeles Times	3/4 stars
The Penguin Guide to Blues Recordings	2.5/4 stars

The Commercial Appeal wrote that "Jagger hasn't sounded this animated in years, singing on 'Don't Start Me to Talkin'' as if he's been living with the blues his whole life." The Atlanta Journal-Constitution praised Rogers's "deceptively casual playing and singing." The Boston Globe was appreciative that "Rogers sings at least a couple of verses on each of these potent, blues-rocking tracks." The Calgary Herald highlighted the "fine work by Fulson and (interestingly enough) Stephen Stills," but concluded that "it's also strangely tame musically." Rolling Stone praised Johnson, deeming him "one brilliant sideman generously giving the perfect send-off to another."

The Dayton Daily News noted that "Clapton sounds particularly engaged, as does Healy." The Lincoln Journal Star said that Rogers's rhythm section "guarantees that the music is the gritty, soulful real deal that Rogers helped develop as guitarist with Muddy Waters." The Chicago Tribune concluded that "a mostly white, British, '60s-hero roster of stars phones in its lines, barely mustering the necessary bounce for electric standards." The Edmonton Journal opined that Robert Plant "is quite convincing trading verses with Rogers, but 'Gonna Shoot You Right Down', another strange choice, loses some focus due to Page's disjointed, out-of-sync lead guitar lines." The Wall Street Journal stated that the best tracks "crackle and sting with a tasty blend of authentic blues and second-generation '60s blues-rock."

AllMusic wrote that, "like its peers, such as John Lee Hooker's Point Blank recordings, the record is slick and well-crafted—it may be blues-lite, but it's highly enjoyable."

== Track listing ==
1. "Blow Wind Blow" (featuring Jeff Healy)
2. "Blues All Day Long" (featuring Eric Clapton)
3. "Trouble No More" (featuring Mick Jagger, Keith Richards)
4. "Bright Lights Big City" (featuring Taj Mahal)
5. "Ev'ry Day I Have the Blues" (featuring Lowell Fulson)
6. "Sweet Home Chicago" (featuring Stephen Stills)
7. "Don't Start Me to Talkin'" (Jagger, Richards)
8. "That's All Right" (Clapton)
9. "Ludella" (Mahal)
10. "Goin' Away Baby" (Jagger, Richards)
11. "Worried Life Blues" (Stills)
12. "Gonna Shoot You Right Down (Boom Boom)" (featuring Jimmy Page, Robert Plant, Clapton)
