= You're So Fine =

You're So Fine may refer to:

== Music ==
=== Albums ===
- You're So Fine, Ike & Tina Turner 1993

=== Songs ===
- "You're So Fine" (Little Walter song), 1953
- "You're So Fine" (The Falcons song), Lance Finney, Willie Schofield, Bob West, 1959
- "You're So Fine" (CNBLUE song), 2016
- "You're So Fine", by Rick Nelson composed by Dorsey Burnette
- "You're So Fine", by Tina Turner
- "You're So Fine", by Rose Royce composed by T. Santiel, A. Santiel
