= You're So Fine (Little Walter song) =

Single by Little Walter
- B-side: "Lights Out"
- Released: December 1953
- Recorded: 1953
- Genre: R&B
- Length: 3:08
- Label: Checker Records
- Songwriter(s): Walter Jacobs

Little Walter singles chronology
"Blues with a Feeling" (1953)	"You're So Fine" (1953)	"Oh Baby" (1954)

"You're So Fine" is a 1953 song, and 1954 chart hit by Little Walter. The song has been covered by Little Mack Simmons and other artists.
