= My Babe =

Blues standard first recorded by Little Walter

Single by Little Walter
- B-side: "Thunder Bird"
- Released: February 1955
- Recorded: January 25, 1955
- Genre: R&B, Chicago blues
- Length: 2:44
- Label: Checker
- Songwriter: Willie Dixon
- Producers: Leonard Chess, Phil Chess

Little Walter singles chronology
"Last Night" (1954)	"My Babe" (1955)	"Roller Coaster" (1955)

"My Babe" is a Chicago blues song and a blues standard written by Willie Dixon for Little Walter. Released in 1955 on Checker Records, a subsidiary of Chess Records, the song was the only Dixon composition ever to become a number one R&B single and it was one of the biggest hits of either of their careers.

== Background ==
Willie Dixon based "My Babe" on the traditional gospel song "This Train (Is Bound For Glory)", recorded by Sister Rosetta Tharpe as "This Train". He reworked the arrangement and lyrics from the sacred (the procession of saints into Heaven) into the secular (a story about a woman that won't stand for her man's cheating): "My baby, she don't stand no cheating, my babe, she don't stand none of that midnight creeping."

== Recording ==
In his autobiography, Dixon recalled:

I felt Little Walter had the feeling for this "My Babe" song. He was the type of fellow who wanted to brag about some chick, somebody he loved, something he was doing or getting away with. He fought it for two long years and I wasn't going to give the song to nobody but him. He said many times he just didn't like it but, by 1955, the Chess people had gained confidence enough in me that they felt if I wanted him to do it, it must be his type of thing. The minute he did it, BOOM! she went right to the top of the charts.

Little Walter recorded the song on January 25, 1955. Accompanying his vocal and harmonica were Robert Lockwood, Jr. and Leonard Caston on guitars, Willie Dixon on double-bass, and Fred Below on drums. Guitarist Luther Tucker, then a member of Walter's band, was absent from the recording session that day. "My Babe" was re-issued in 1961 with an overdubbed female vocal backing chorus and briefly crossed over to the pop charts.

== Releases and charts ==
Ray Charles had famously, and controversially, pioneered the gospel-song-to-secular-song approach with his reworking of the gospel hymn "It Must Be Jesus" into "I Got a Woman," which hit the Billboard R&B charts on January 22, 1955, later climbing to the number one position for one week. Within days of the appearance of Charles's song on the national charts, Little Walter recorded "My Babe" and Checker released it while "I've Got a Woman" was still on the charts. The single eclipsed Charles's record by spending 19 weeks on the Billboard R&B charts beginning on March 12, 1955, including five weeks at the top position, making it one of the biggest R&B hits of 1955. The B-side of "My Babe" was the harmonica instrumental "Thunderbird," following the pattern established by the release of Little Walter's number one hit single from 1952, "Juke," of featuring a vocal performance ("Can't Hold On Much Longer") on one side and a harmonica instrumental on the flip side.

== Recognition and influence ==
In 2008, "My Babe" was inducted into the Blues Foundation Hall of Fame in the "Classic of Blues Recording – Singles or Album Tracks" category. The song has been recorded by artists with a variety of backgrounds, including rock, R&B, country, and jazz.
