= The Radiants =

- Origin: Chicago, Illinois
- Genres: Doo-wop
- Years active: 1960–1972
- Labels: Chess
- Spinoffs: Maurice & Mac
- Past members: Maurice McAlister; Wallace Sampson; Jerome Brooks; Elize Butler; Charles Washington; Green McLauren; Frank McCollum; Leonard Caston Jr.; James Jameson; Victor Caston; Mitchell Bullock

The Radiants were an American doo-wop and R&B group popular in the 1960s.

The group formed in Chicago, Illinois, in 1960, where its members met singing in the youth choir of Greater Harvest Baptist Church. They performed both gospel and secular tunes, the latter of which were written by leader Maurice McAlister. While attempting to land a record deal, they found that labels were not interested in gospel groups anymore, and concentrated on secular tunes, eventually landing a deal with Chess Records. Billy Davis produced their early records, including the first, "Father Knows Best" b/w "One Day I'll Show You", which was a regional hit in Cleveland in 1962.

Several more singles for Chess followed, but did not sell well, and by 1964 the group had more or less broken up. McAlister and baritone Wallace Sampson continued on as a trio with new member Leonard Caston Jr. (son of Leonard Caston). With this line-up they had their biggest hit, 1964's "Voice Your Choice". The follow-up, "Ain't No Big Thing", was also a hit.

Caston left the group in 1965, replaced by James Jameson. This line-up recorded only one single, "Baby You Got It", before McAlister departed. At this time, Chess had another group, The Confessions, led by Mitchell Bullock, on its roster, who had recorded the single "Don't It Make You Feel Kinda Bad" but broken up before the album's release. Billy Davis had Bullock join The Radiants with Sampson, Jameson, and Victor Caston, the younger brother of Leonard Jr. The recording of "Don't It Make You Feel Kinda Bad" made by The Confessions was then issued under The Radiants' name in 1967.

This line-up produced one more hit single, "Hold On", and after several more failed singles the group was dropped by Chess in 1969. They continued to perform together through 1972. McAlister and tenor Green McLauren also recorded as Maurice & Mac.

== Members ==
- Maurice McAlister (lead) (1960–65)
- Wallace Sampson (baritone)
- Jerome Brooks (second tenor) (1960–64)
- Elize Butler (bass) (1960–64)
- Charles Washington (first tenor) (1960–62)
- Green McLauren (first tenor) (1962–63)
- Frank McCollum (first tenor) (1963–64)
- Leonard Caston, Jr. (tenor) (1964–65)
- James Jameson (tenor) (1965-?)
- Victor Caston
- Mitchell Bullock (lead) (1967-1972)

== Charting singles ==
Year	Title	Chart Positions	
Year	Title	U.S. Billboard Hot 100	U.S. R&B Singles chart
1962	"Father Knows Best"	#100	-
1964	"Voice Your Choice"	#51	#16
1965	"Ain't No Big Thing"	#91	#14
1967	"(Don't It Make You) Feel Kinda Bad"	-	#47
1968	"Hold On"	#68	#35
