= That's All Right (Jimmy Rogers song) =

Blues standard

Single by Jimmy Rogers
- B-side: "Ludella"
- Released: 1950
- Recorded: Chicago, August 15, 1950
- Genre: Blues
- Length: 2:46
- Label: Chess
- Songwriter(s): Jimmy Rogers (credited)
- Producer(s): Leonard Chess

"That's All Right"or "That's Alright" is a blues song adapted by Chicago blues singer and guitarist Jimmy Rogers. He recorded it in 1950 with Little Walter on harmonica. Although based on earlier blues songs, music writer John Collis calls Rogers' rendition "one of the most tuneful and instantly memorable of all variations on the basic blues format". The song became a blues standard and has been recorded by numerous blues and other artists.

== Origins ==
Jimmy Rogers has acknowledged that "That's All Right" draws on ideas from other bluesmen, including Robert Junior Lockwood and Willie Love. However, he feels he pulled it all together: "I put some verses with it and built it that way. I built the song". Lockwood had performed it years earlier in Helena, Arkansas, which Muddy Waters confirmed: "'That's All Right', that Robert Jr.'s song", he added.

In 1947, Othum Brown recorded "Ora Nelle Blues" (Chance 1116), described as "substantially the same song". Little Walter on harmonica accompanies Brown on vocal and guitar and some pressings of the Chance single are titled "That's Alright" and credited to "Little Water J." Blues researcher Tony Glover suggests that Jimmy Rogers played lead guitar on the first take of the song and that Brown took the theme from Rogers. An earlier version of "Ora Nelle Blues" was recorded on a "one-shot vanity disc" by Floyd Jones on vocal and guitar with Little Walter providing second guitar.

== Composition and recording ==
On August 15, 1950, Jimmy Rogers recorded "That's All Right" at the end of recording session for Muddy Waters. Little Walter on harmonica and Ernest "Big" Crawford on bass also participated, but Muddy Waters does not appear. The trio performed the song as a moderate- to slow-tempo twelve-bar blues. It features Rogers' guitar and plaintive vocals, with Little Walter playing in the style of Sonny Boy Williamson I.

Despite the title, the lyrics indicate "clearly ... it is not 'all right'":

You told me baby, your love for me was strong
When I woke up little girl half of this, big world was gone
But that's all right, I know you don't love me no more, but that's all right

Chess Records issued the song as Rogers debut single for the label, backed with "Ludella". Although it did not reach the singles charts, "That's All Right" became immediately popular with Chicago blues musicians. It also cemented Rogers' relationship with Leonard Chess, leading to his nine-year association with Chess Records. Rogers performed the song throughout his career, recording additional studio and live versions of the song.

== Legacy ==
In 2016, "That's All Right" was inducted into the Blues Foundation Blues Hall of Fame. In the inductee announcement, the Foundation called it a "poignant reflection sung in Rogers’ characteristically warm and empathetic style, with Little Walter's sensitive support on harmonica". It also identifies the song as a blues standard, which has been "recorded by dozens of artists over the years".
