= Off the Wall (Little Walter song) =

Single by Little Walter
- B-side: "Tell Me Mama"
- Released: April 1953
- Recorded: January 1953
- Studio: Universal, Chicago, Illinois
- Genre: Chicago blues; Blues
- Length: 2:52
- Label: Checker (Checker 770)
- Songwriter: Walter Jacobs
- Producers: Leonard Chess and Phil Chess

Little Walter singles chronology
"Sad Hours / Mean Old World" (1952)	"Off the Wall" (1953)	"Blues with a Feeling" (1953)

"Off the Wall" is a 1953 blues instrumental and single by Little Walter. The single followed "Tell Me Mama", which had reached #10 on the R&B charts, reaching #8. Following Little Walter's recording Big Walter Horton claimed to be the composer, and he recorded the same harmonica-led tune in Memphis on 28 May 1953 for Sun Records.
