= Rabon Tarrant =

American jazz musician (1908–1975)

Robert W. "Rabon" Tarrant (December 25, 1908 – October 11, 1975) was an American jump blues and jazz drummer, singer and songwriter. His most notable composition was "Blues with a Feeling", later recorded by Little Walter and many other musicians, becoming a blues standard.

== Biography ==
Tarrant was born in Ennis, Texas. He later lived in Wichita Falls with his uncle, who led a brass band. Tarrant played drums in bands led by banjoist Otis Stafford, and trumpeter Roy McCloud, before joining Lafayette Thompson's Golden Dragon Orchestra and touring with them in Colorado and Texas in the early 1930s. He also toured with Bert Johnson's Sharps and Flats.

By the mid-1930s, he was based in California, where he played with Edith Turnham's Orchestra in San Diego, and then with Bert Johnson's brother Cee Pee Johnson's orchestra in Hollywood. He first recorded as the drummer with Jack McVea's orchestra in 1944. Tarrant was occasionally credited on records from 1945, and became the vocalist on about one-third of the tracks recorded by McVea in the late 1940s. Tarrant was the featured vocalist on McVea's version of "Open the Door, Richard", the first of many recordings of the novelty song, which reached number 2 on the R&B chart and number 3 on the Billboard pop chart in early 1947. He also wrote for McVea's band, his songs including "Lonesome Blues," "Naggin' Woman Blues," and "Slowly Going Crazy Blues." In early 1947, he recorded his composition "Blues with a Feeling" with McVea's band, and it was issued by Black & White Records. Although not reaching any published charts, the song was successfully covered by Little Walter in 1953, and later by many other artists.

Tarrant also led his own sessions from around 1945, on some of which his band included Charles Mingus (bass) and Lucky Thompson (tenor saxophone). As Rabon Toren, he recorded with Charlie Whitfield in 1952. From the early 1950s, Tarrant led his own band, which performed for the following two decades.

Tarrant died in Huntington Park, California, in 1975.
