= Rockin' in Time =

Rock history book by David Szatmary

- First edition
- Author: David Szatmary
- Language: English
- Genre: Non-fiction
- Publisher: Pearson
- Publication date: 1987
- ISBN: 978-0-131-88790-9

Rockin' In Time: A Social History of Rock-and-Roll is a rock history book written by David Szatmary. It was originally published in 1987 and is now in its eighth edition (2014).

The book begins with a discussion the African-American culture and hits and its influences to creation of rock and roll. The first chapter explains in detail the relationship between racism in the United States and the birth of Rock & Roll as blues. Szatmary does an excellent job of providing a comprehensive, yet concise history of Rock and Roll as a cultural and historical phenomenon. In the last chapter, the book talks about the 21st century rock. The book includes 27 chapters.

== Reception ==
In a positive review, the classical music composer Craig H. Russell called Rockin' in Time "one of the best books on rock music published, is an ideal text for a collegiate course, and would be a valuable addition to any rock fan's library". The musicologist Eileen Southern penned a negative review, stating, "The author's excessive use of quotation to move his narrative along detracts seriously from its effect, especially since little effort is expended in identifying the sources of the quotations. His style is pedestrian at best, and often is obscure." She concluded, "This work's usefulness as a history is limited, for its simplistic generalizations too often are misleading or erroneous."

Paul Feehan of Library Journal found the book to be "a concise yet comprehensive account of the origins and evolution of rock music" that employs "a lively, anecdotal approach and pertinent quotes". Writing in Interdisciplinary Humanities, Michael Jauchen said the book "can function not only as a serviceable reference book but also as a springboard into the student's own personal fascinations with the infinite footnotes and minutia of rock-and-roll".
