= Oh Baby (Little Walter song) =

Single by Little Walter And His Jukes
- B-side: "Rocker"
- Released: April 1954
- Genre: R&B
- Label: Checker Records
- Songwriters: Walter Jacobs, Willie Dixon

"Oh Baby" is a 1954 song written by Walter Jacobs and Willie Dixon, first recorded by Jacobs as Little Walter And His Jukes in 1954. The song has been covered by Led Zeppelin, Kim Wilson and many others.
