= Mean Old World =

Blues standard first recorded by T-Bone Walker

Single by T-Bone Walker
- B-side: "I Got a Break, Baby"
- Released: November 1945
- Recorded: Hollywood, July 20, 1942
- Genre: Blues
- Length: 2:56
- Label: Capitol

"Mean Old World" is a blues song recorded by American blues electric guitar musician T-Bone Walker in 1942. It has been described (along with the single's B-side) as "the first important blues recordings on the electric guitar". Over the years it has been interpreted and recorded by numerous blues, jazz and rock and roll artists.

== Original song ==
T-Bone Walker began performing "Mean Old World" when he was with Les Hite and His Orchestra from 1939 to 1940. After leaving Hite's band, Walker continued to develop and refine his style on the Los Angeles club circuit. On July 20, 1942, he recorded "Mean Old World" for Capitol Records. The song was performed in the West Coast blues style, with a small combo of pianist Freddie Slack, bassist Jud DeNaut, and drummer Dave Coleman accompanying Walker on vocal and guitar. "Mean Old World" "showcased T-Bones's new, and already developed, style, in which he answered his smoky, soulful vocal phrases with deft, stinging, jazz-inflected lead lines on his electric guitar". Capitol released the song in November 1945, with "I Got a Break, Baby", as the third disc in a five 10-inch record collection "The History of Jazz, Volume 3: Then Came Swing" (Capitol Criterion CE 18). Capitol later issued it as a single in 1947 (Capitol 15003).

Because of a recording ban, T-Bone Walker did not record again until October 10, 1944, for the Rhumboogie label in Chicago. He recorded a variation on "Mean Old World", initially designated "T-Bone Blues No. 2". When Rhumboogie released it in 1946, it was retitled "Mean Old World Blues". It did not feature Walker's guitar as prominently (the backing group, Marl Young's Orchestra, had a five-piece horn section) and some new lyrics were substituted. Walker commented "those sides were not so hot, not as good as the ones in L.A. later. They were big band numbers, more like what I recorded with Hite". However, the opening verses remained the same:

This is a mean old world, baby to live in by yourself
This is a mean old world, babe to live in by yourself
When you can't get the woman you love, you know she's loving someone else

This anticipated future versions, in which new lyrics would be added to the familiar opening lines. On December 14, 1956, Walker recorded another version for Atlantic Records that was released on the acclaimed 1959 album T-Bone Blues. He is backed by a small combo with Lloyd Glenn on piano, Billy Hadnot on bass, and Oscar Bradley on drums.

== Little Walter version ==
"Mean Old World"

Single by Little Walter and His Night Cats
- A-side: "Sad Hours"
- Released: November 1952
- Recorded: October 1952, Chicago, Illinois
- Genre: Chicago blues; Blues
- Length: 2:55
- Label: Checker (764)
- Songwriters: Little Walter (credited); adapted from T-Bone Walker
- Producers: Leonard & Phil Chess

Little Walter and His Night Cats singles chronology
"Juke" (1952)	"Mean Old World" (1952)	"Off the Wall" (1953)

In October 1952, Little Walter recorded his version of "Mean Old World" for Checker Records, a subsidiary of Chess Records. It was recast as a Chicago blues, with Walter's amplified harmonica prominently featured and several new lyrics substituted. The song was a hit, reaching number six on the Billboard R&B chart, where it remained for six weeks in 1953. Backing Little Walter are the Aces, with guitarists Louis and Dave Myers and drummer Fred Below. T-Bone Walker's Capitol version was released before Billboard magazine or a similar service began tracking such releases, so it is difficult to gauge which version was more popular. Little Walter received the sole credit for his recording.
