= Leonard Caston =

American blues pianist and guitarist (1917–1987)

- Born: Leonard Caston Sr. June 2, 1917; Sumrall, Mississippi, United States
- Died: August 22, 1987 (aged 70) Minneapolis, Minnesota, United States
- Genres: Blues
- Occupation(s): Pianist, guitarist
- Instrument(s): Piano, guitar

Leonard "Baby Doo" Caston (June 2, 1917 – August 22, 1987) was an American blues pianist and guitarist. He is best noted for the tracks "Blues at Midnight" and "I'm Gonna Walk Your Log".

== Life and career ==
Leonard Caston Sr. was born in Sumrall, Mississippi, United States, and raised in Meadville, Mississippi, from age eight. He lived in Chicago from 1934 to 1936 but then moved back to Mississippi after his family relocated to Natchez. He learned to play piano under the influence of Leroy Carr and Art Tatum; he has also credited Andy Kirk, Jimmy Rogers, and his relative Kim Weathersby as stylistic influences.

In 1938 he returned to Chicago, where he met with Mayo Williams, a producer for Decca Records. Williams recorded him in a trio with Eugene Gilmore and Arthur Dixon. Dixon introduced Caston to his brother, Willie Dixon. Caston, Willie Dixon, Jimmy Gilmore, Joe Bell, and Willie Hawthorne then formed the Five Breezes, a group in the style of the Ink Spots. In 1940, Caston recorded his first solo record for Decca, "The Death of Walter Barnes", with Robert Nighthawk on harmonica.

The Five Breezes disbanded in 1941, and Caston began playing in the Rhythm Rascals Trio with Alfred Elkins and Ollie Crawford. The group did USO tours and in 1945 performed at a conference for Dwight Eisenhower, Bernard Montgomery, and Georgy Zhukov. After the war, Caston recorded under his own name and with Roosevelt Sykes and Walter Davis and performed in many studio sessions. He also recorded again with Dixon as the Four Jumps of Jive and the Big Three Trio, playing in both groups with Bernardo Dennis. Ollie Crawford joined this group soon after Dennis's departure. The Big Three Trio recorded for Columbia Records and Okeh Records.

The Big Three Trio's last sides were recorded in 1952, but the group did not officially break up until 1956. Caston continued performing for decades afterwards, reuniting with Dixon to perform in 1984.

Caston released an album, Baby Doo's House Party, shortly before his death from heart disease in Minneapolis, Minnesota, in 1987.

His son, Leonard Caston, Jr., is an R&B singer and songwriter, who sang with the Radiants, and wrote songs for Motown Records, among other endeavors.
