= Juke (instrumental) =

Single by Little Walter & His Night Cats
- B-side: "Can't Hold on Much Longer"
- Released: August 1952
- Recorded: May 12, 1952
- Studio: Universal Recording (Chicago)
- Genre: Chicago blues
- Length: 2:44
- Label: Checker
- Songwriter: Walter Jacobs a.k.a. Little Walter
- Producer: Leonard Chess

Little Walter & His Night Cats singles chronology
"Juke" (1952)	"Mean Old World" (1952)

"Juke" is a harmonica instrumental recorded by the Chicago bluesman Little Walter Jacobs in 1952. Although Little Walter had been recording sporadically for small Chicago labels over the previous five years, and had appeared on Muddy Waters' records for Chess Records since 1950, "Juke" was Little Walter's first hit, and it was the most important of his career. Due to the influence of Little Walter on blues harmonica, "Juke" is now considered a blues harmonica standard.

== Recording ==
In May 1952, Little Walter had been a regular member of the Muddy Waters Band for at least three years. "Juke" was recorded on 12 May 1952 at the beginning (not the end, as commonly thought) of a recording session with Muddy Waters and his band, which at the time consisted of Waters and Jimmy Rogers on guitars, and Elgin Evans on drums, in addition to Little Walter on harmonica. The originally released recording of "Juke" was the first completed take of the first song attempted at the first Little Walter session for Leonard Chess; the song was released as a single at the end of July on Chess's subsidiary label Checker Records The song was recorded by recording engineer Bill Putnam at his Universal Recording Corporation studio at 111 E. Ontario St., on the near north side of Chicago. (Coincidentally, several years earlier Putnam had recorded one of the few other harmonica instrumentals ever to become a hit record, "Peg O' My Heart" by The Harmonicats.)

After recording two takes of "Juke" (the second, vastly different alternate take finally being issued for the first time over 40 years later), at the same session Little Walter recorded "Can't Hold On Much Longer", which took considerably more takes than "Juke" to complete. After the completion of Little Walter's recordings, Muddy Waters recorded his only song that day, "Please Have Mercy", backed by Little Walter and the band.

== Composition ==
"Juke" is played as a swinging shuffle featuring a boogie-woogie guitar pattern, and is originally in the key of E; Walter played it in "second position" (cross harp) on a harmonica. But at the beginning of the second 12 bar chorus there are some odd meter changes that seem like ||4/4 | 3/4 | 4/4 | 2/4 |then onward in 4/4/ thereafter. Whether it was intentional is unknown; some early blues artists occasionally freely varied the strict 12 bar blues form. "Juke" contains eight choruses.

The harmonica playing in "Juke" is deep-toned and features long saxophone-like phrases. "Juke" is a dynamic song, building and releasing in intensity several times. The opening eight bars of the song, or "head", consist of a repeated six note phrase commonly and frequently played by jazz and swing horn players in the 1930s and 1940s. The much-studied and debated head that opens "Juke" was used most notably in Louis Armstrong's 1941 recording "Leap Frog", an instrumental that was recorded later in the 1940s by several other artists, but the exact source of Little Walter's inspiration is unknown. The remainder of the song is an improvisation of Little Walter's own invention.

"Juke" was originally titled on the recording session log as "Your Pat Will Play"; later it was discovered that this was a mistake, a mis-hearing of Little Walter's intended title, "Your Cat Will Play". The song was renamed "Juke" upon release in July 1952, probably by label owner Leonard Chess.

Junior Wells later claimed that he was playing "Juke" prior to Little Walter's recording of it, although Wells never recorded his version. Snooky Pryor's 1948 recording "Snooky and Moody's Boogie," begins with the same repeated ascending riff that Little Walter uses in the first eight bars of "Juke", although the remainder is distinctly different. (Pryor himself claimed in an interview that Walter "picked up 'Snooky and Moody's Boogie' and made 'Juke' out of it.") Jimmy Rogers, guitarist on "Juke", claimed that parts of "Juke" were based on an unrecorded intermission/theme song frequently played by piano player Sunnyland Slim, which he called "Get Up the Stairs Madamoiselle".

== Successes ==
In an apparent acknowledgement of Little Walter's unique instrumental skills, the instrumental "Juke" was promoted as the A-side of the single, with the vocal "Can't Hold On Much Longer" as the B-side. Within weeks of its release, "Juke" had reached the number-one spot on Billboard's R&B chart, unheard of for a harmonica instrumental; no other harmonica instrumental has ever achieved this position, before or since. "Juke" was not only a major success for Little Walter, it was the biggest hit record by any artist for Chess or any of its associated labels up until that time, and only the third Chess record to hit number one. Juke stayed in the top spot for eight weeks, surpassing both previous Chess number one hits, which had occupied the position for a combined total of six weeks. The record stayed on the Billboard charts for a total of 20 weeks, and was one of the biggest R&B hits in the U.S. in 1952.

== Impact ==
The hit song launched Little Walter's successful solo career, and he immediately left the Muddy Waters band to form his own band, which was initially known as "The Jukes" in order to capitalize on the success of his hit single. Beginning with the massive success of Juke, Little Walter would go on to eclipse the chart success of his former boss Muddy Waters through the rest of the 1950s.

Juke became the most important and influential song for blues harmonica players of the era, and was expected to be in the repertoire of any serious blues harmonica player; at least in Chicago, blues harmonica players were judged on their ability to play it. In addition, Juke popularized the Chicago blues harmonica technique still in use today by harmonica players around the world: using a small hand-held microphone cupped to the harmonica to produce a dynamic, rich and slightly distorted amplified harmonica sound.

== Recognition ==
On December 19, 2007, the Recording Academy announced that it was inducting Little Walter's recording of "Juke" into the Grammy Hall of Fame in 2008, as a song that "exemplify[s] the best qualities that make the recording arts such a vital part of our culture – and each not only uniquely reflects the zeitgeist of its time, but also possesses the enduring power of transcending time."

In 1986, "Juke" was inducted into the Blues Foundation Hall of Fame in the "Classics of Blues Recordings – Singles or Album Tracks" category. Writing for the Foundation, blues historian O'Neal noted: "Other Chicago harmonicists had played similar tunes ... but it was Walter who made it into a masterpiece, ushering in a new sound with his swooping, amplified attack."

"Juke" has been recorded by Big Walter Horton, James Cotton, Billy Branch, Paul Butterfield and Carey Bell, among others.
