= The Aces (blues band) =

- Also known as: The Three Deuces; the Three Aces; the Four Aces; the Jukes
- Origin: Chicago, Illinois U.S.
- Genres: Chicago blues, jazz
- Years active: 1950s–1970s
- Past members: Louis Myers; Dave Myers; Junior Wells; Fred Below

The Aces was led by the guitarist brothers Louis and Dave Myers, who were from Byhalia, Mississippi.

== Career ==
The Little Boys were created by the Myers brothers. The band had several renames after Junior Wells and Fred Below joined.

The quartet remained until Wells left during the early 1950s. As The Jukes, they joined Little Walter to capitalize on his hit single, "Juke". After the end of the group, it freed the members to reform as a backing band for other Chicago blues musicians, including Otis Rush, Eddie Boyd, and others.

In the late 1950s, Dave Myers switched from the guitar to the electric bass, becoming one of the first Chicago bluesmen to adopt this relatively new instrument and helping to popularize it in Chicago blues. During the 1960s, 1970s and 1980s the original Aces periodically reunited for recordings, tours, and festivals.

In 2016 the Killer Blues Headstone Project placed the headstone for Dave Myers at Burr Oak Cemetery in Alsip, Illinois.

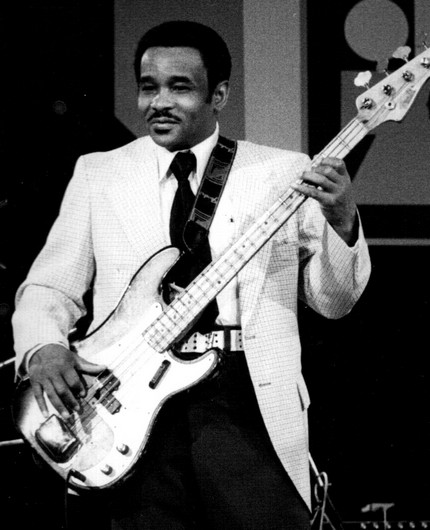
Dave Myers in 1978

== Personnel ==
- Louis Myers, September 18, 1929 – September 5, 1994
- Dave Myers, October 30, 1926 – September 3, 2001
- Fred Below, September 16, 1926 – August 14, 1988
