= All Music Guide to the Blues =

Nonfiction book on blues music

All Music Guide to the Blues: The Definitive Guide to the Blues
- The cover of the third edition of All Music Guide to the Blues: The Definitive Guide to the Blues
- Author: Vladimir Bogdanov; Chris Woodstra; Stephen Thomas Erlewine
- Language: English
- Series: All Music Guide to...
- Subject: Blues
- Genre: Non-fiction; Encyclopedic; Reference
- Publisher: Backbeat Books
- Publication date: April 2003 (3rd)
- Media type: Paperback
- Pages: 800
- ISBN: 0-87930-736-6
- OCLC: 51389035
- Dewey Decimal: 016.781643/0266 21
- LC Class: ML156.4.B6 A45 2003

All Music Guide to the Blues: The Definitive Guide to the Blues is a non-fiction, encyclopedic referencing of blues music compiled under the direction of All Media Guide.

== Content ==
The book's third edition was released in April 2003 and was edited by Vladimir Bogdanov, Chris Woodstra and Stephen Thomas Erlewine.

The book's back cover touts that the book contains ratings for close to 9,000 album and 935 musician biographies. Artists are set up alphabetically and include some of the following: birth and death dates, classification (vocals, guitar, drums, etc.), a biography, a discography. The discography listings include a five star rating, the music label it was released on, and the date as well as possibly reviews of certain albums.

All Music Guide to the Blues: The Definitive Guide to the Blues also includes 30 essays covering different styles of blues, along with "top lists" and extensive charts on the evolution and lineage of the blues.

== See also ==
- All Music Guide to Jazz
- AllMusic
