= Fred Below =

American drummer

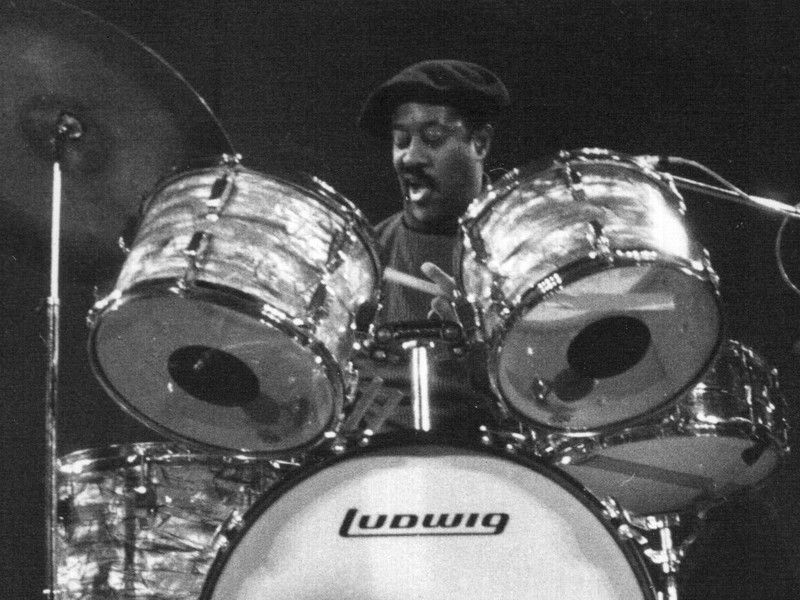
- Below in 1975

Background information
- Born: Frederick Below Jr. September 6, 1926; Chicago, Illinois, U.S.
- Died: August 13, 1988 (aged 61) Chicago, Illinois, U.S.
- Genres: Blues
- Occupation: Musician
- Instrument: Drums
- Years active: 1940s–1980s

Frederick Below Jr. (September 6, 1926 – August 13, 1988) was an American blues drummer who worked with Little Walter and Chess Records in the 1950s. According to Tony Russell, Below was a creator of much of the rhythmic structure of Chicago blues, especially its backbeat. He was the drummer on Chuck Berry's song "Johnny B. Goode". He also recorded with J. B. Lenoir.

== Career ==
Below was born in Chicago, and as he put it – "grew up around nothing but music". He started learning music and playing drums in the DuSable High School and at about the age of 14, formed a sort of a jazz band with two of his high school friends, Johnny Griffin and Eugene Wright.

As a young man, Below served in the Army twice. The first time between 1945–1946, after being conscripted into the United States Army, he served in the infantry ("I practiced on helmet liners, helmets, boxes and things like that").

In 1946, when he was discharged from his service and came back home to Chicago, Below attended the reputable Roy C. Knapp School of Percussion, from which he graduated in 1948, and in which he received a wide and thorough musical education.

Below re-enlisted the army in 1948, this time as part of the Special Services, and he served in Germany as a member of the 427th Army band. After that second service, he stayed and played in a nightclub in Germany before returning to the United States in 1951.

Back in Chicago, Below joined the Aces, a band comprising the guitar-playing brothers Louis and Dave Myers and the harmonica player Junior Wells. In 1952, Little Walter left the Muddy Waters band to pursue a solo career, Wells took over his role on harp in the Muddy Waters band, and Walter commandeered the Aces (the Myers brothers and Below). As Little Walter and the Nightcats, they became one of the top electric blues bands in Chicago.

In 1955, Below left Little Walter's band to concentrate on working as a session musician for Chess Records. However, he continued to play on Little Walter's records. He also played on hit records for Muddy Waters, Junior Wells, Chuck Berry, Bo Diddley, Jimmy Rogers, Elmore James, Otis Rush, and Howlin' Wolf.

Below worked with bassist Willie Dixon, Little Walter, and guitarist Robert Lockwood, Jr. on John Brim's last single for Chess, "I Would Hate to See You Go" (1956).

Among his more famous work, he played on Chuck Berry's 1957 hit single "School Days" as well as on other Berry recording including "Brown Eyed Handsome Man" (1956), "Roll Over Beethoven" (1956), "Too Much Monkey Business" (1956), the calypso flavored, "Havana Moon" (1956), "Rock and Roll Music" (1957), "Sweet Little Sixteen" (1957), "Reelin' and Rockin'" (1957), "Guitar Boogie" (1957), "Memphis, Tennessee" (1958), "Sweet Little Rock and Roller" (1958), "Little Queenie" (1958), "Almost Grown" (1959), "Back in the U.S.A." (1959) and "Let It Rock" (1959).

Below rejoined the Myers brothers for a tour of Europe in 1970.

Below died of liver cancer on August 13, 1988, in Chicago, at the age of 61.

== Partial discography ==
Artist	Song title	Date recorded	Highest position on US pop chart	Highest position on R&B chart	Miscellaneous
Muddy Waters	"I Just Want to Make Love to You"	April 13, 1954		No. 4	
Muddy Waters	"I'm Your Hoochie Cooche Man"	1954		No. 3	
Muddy Waters	"I'm Ready"	September 1, 1954		No. 4	
Little Walter	"Mellow Down Easy"	1954			
Little Walter	"My Babe"	January 25, 1955		No. 1	
Willie Dixon	"Walkin' the Blues"	1955		No. 6	
Howlin' Wolf	"Spoonful"	1960			
Howlin' Wolf	"Wang Dang Doodle"	1960			

With Howlin' Wolf

- Live and Cookin' (Chess, 1972)

With Roosevelt Sykes

- Feel Like Blowing My Horn (Delmark, 1970 [1973])

With Sonny Boy Williamson

- The Real Folk Blues (Chess, 1947-64 [1966])
