= Blues Foundation =

American nonprofit organization

- Formation: 1980; 46 years ago
- Type: Nonprofit corporation
- Headquarters: Memphis, Tennessee
- Website: www.blues.org

The Blues Foundation is an American nonprofit corporation established in 1980, and headquartered in Memphis, Tennessee. Its mission is to "Preserve blues heritage, celebrate blues recording and performance, expand worldwide awareness of the blues, and ensure the future of the uniquely American art form."

As of October, 2025, it is affiliated with 108 blues organizations of United States and the various parts of the world. A 14-person board of directors governs the foundation.

On its formation, the foundation organized the annual W. C. Handy Awards to "give recognition of the finest in blues performances and recordings." The awards have since been renamed to the Blues Music Awards. The BMAs are generally recognized as the highest honor given to blues musicians, and are awarded by vote of Blues Foundation members.

The Blues Foundation is also responsible for the Blues Hall of Fame Museum, International Blues Challenge (IBC), Keeping the Blues Alive Award (KBA) and Blues in the Schools program.

Every year, the Blues Foundation presents the KBA Awards to individuals and organizations that have made significant contributions to blues music. The KBA ceremony are held in conjunction with the International Blues Challenge. The KBAs are awarded on the basis of merit, by a select panel of blues professionals, working to actively promote and document the music.

The foundation established the HART Fund (Handy Artists Relief Trust) for blues musicians, and their families in financial need, due to a broad range of health concerns. The HART Fund provides for acute, chronic and preventive medical and dental care, as well as funeral expenses.

As of October 2025, Kimberly Horton is the president and chief executive officer of the Foundation.

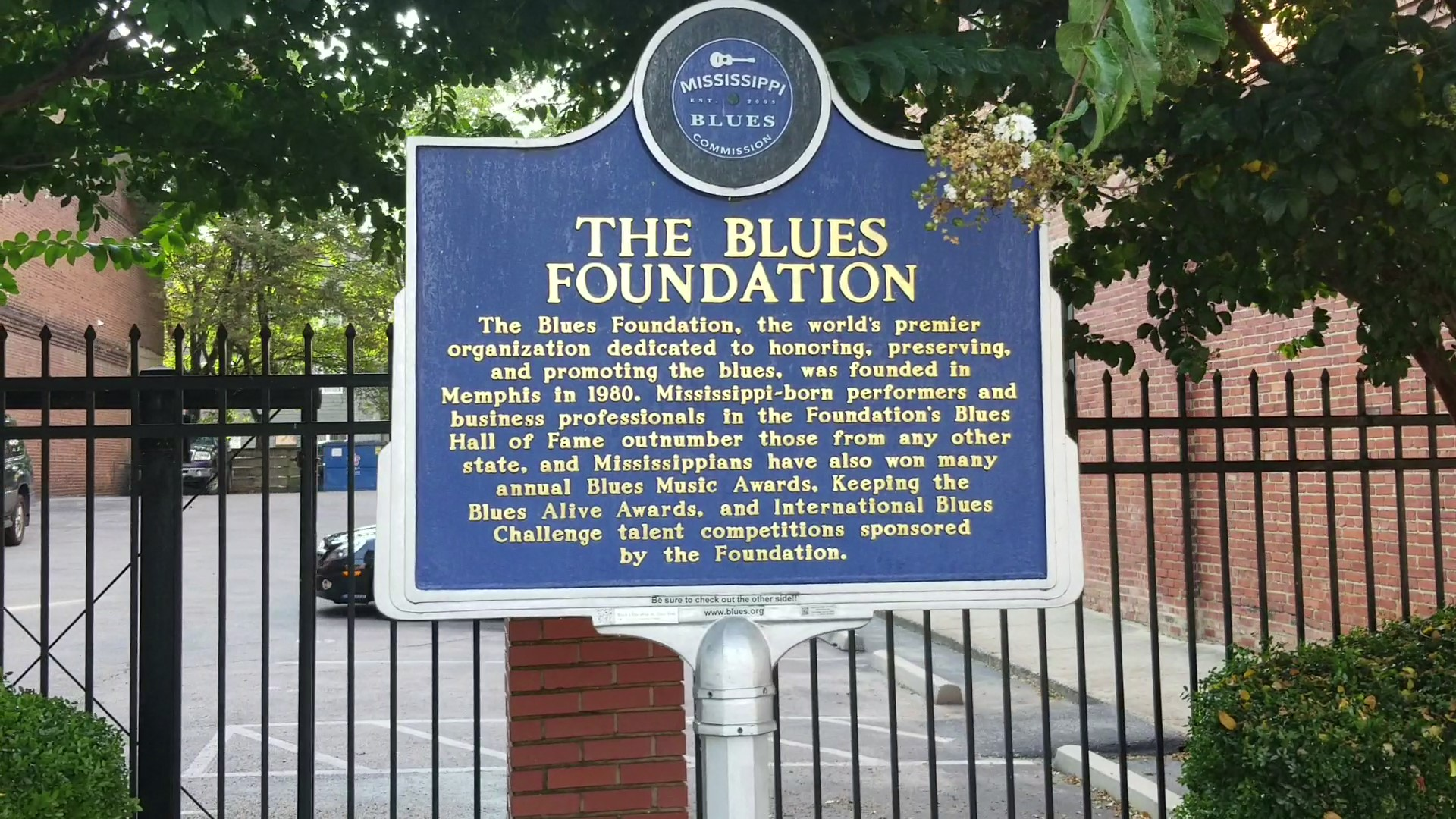
Blues Foundation Blues Trail Marker

== See also ==
- Blues Hall of Fame
- Blues Music Award
- International Blues Challenge
