= Jimmy Rogers =

American Chicago blues musician (1924–1997)

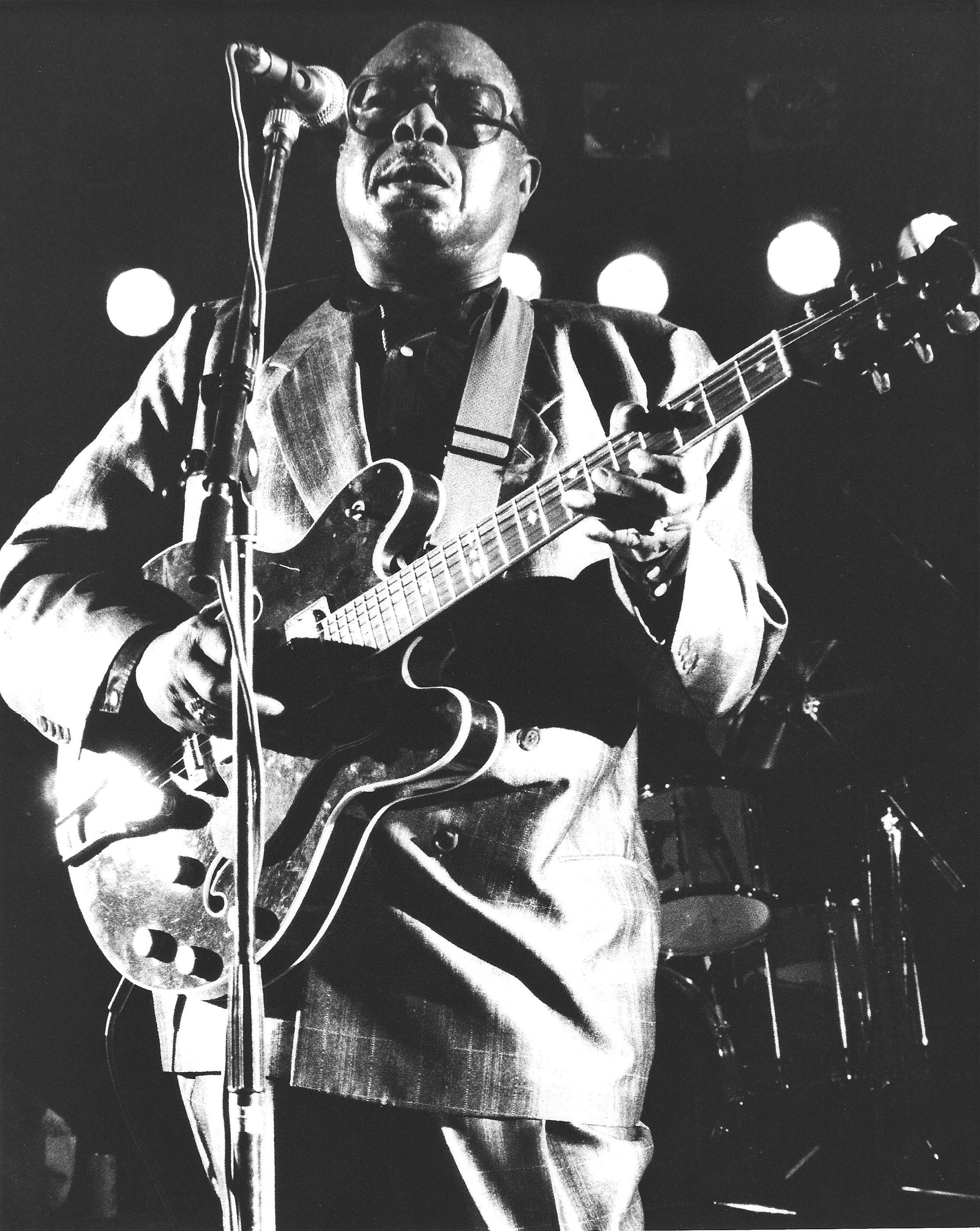
- Rogers in concert in 1991

Background information
- Born: Jay or James Arthur Lane; June 3, 1924 near Ruleville, Mississippi, U.S.
- Died: December 19, 1997 (aged 73) Chicago
- Genres: Chicago blues
- Occupation: Musician
- Instruments: Vocals; guitar; harmonica
- Years active: 1946–1997
- Label: Chess

Jay or James Arthur "Jimmy" Rogers (June 3, 1924 – December 19, 1997) was an American Chicago blues singer, guitarist and harmonica player, best known for his work as a member of Muddy Waters's band in the early 1950s. He also had a solo career and recorded several popular blues songs, including "That's All Right" (now a blues standard), "Chicago Bound", "Walking by Myself" (his sole R&B chart appearance), and "Rock This House". He withdrew from the music industry at the end of the 1950s, but returned to recording and touring in the 1970s.

== Career ==
Rogers was born Jay or James Arthur Lane, near to Ruleville, Mississippi, on June 3, 1924. He was raised in Atlanta and Memphis. He adopted his stepfather's surname. He learned to play the harmonica with his childhood friend Snooky Pryor, and as a teenager he took up the guitar. He played professionally in East St. Louis, Illinois, with Robert Lockwood, Jr., among others. Rogers moved to Chicago in the mid-1940s. By 1946, he had recorded as a harmonica player and singer for the Harlem record label, run by J. Mayo Williams. Rogers's name did not appear on the record, which was mislabeled as the work of Memphis Slim and His Houserockers.

In 1947, Rogers, Muddy Waters and Little Walter began playing together, forming Waters's first band in Chicago (sometimes referred to as the Headcutters or the Headhunters, because of their practice of stealing jobs from other local bands). The band members recorded and released music credited to each of them as solo artists. The band defined the sound of the nascent Chicago blues style (more specifically, South Side Chicago blues). Rogers recorded several sides of his own with small labels in Chicago, but none were released at the time. He began to achieve success as a solo artist in 1950, with the song "That's All Right", released by Chess Records, but he stayed in Waters's band until 1954. In the mid-1950s he had several successful records released by Chess, most of them featuring either Little Walter or Big Walter Horton on harmonica, notably "Walking by Myself". In the late 1950s, as interest in the blues waned, he gradually withdrew from the music industry.

In the early 1960s, Rogers briefly worked as a member of Howling Wolf's band, before quitting the music business altogether for almost a decade. He worked as a taxicab driver and owned a clothing store, which burned down in the 1968 Chicago riots following the assassination of Martin Luther King Jr. Rogers gradually began performing in public again, and in 1971, when fashions made him somewhat popular in Europe, he began occasionally touring and recording, including a 1977 session with Waters which resulted in the album I'm Ready. By 1982, Rogers was again a full-time solo artist. He continued touring and recording albums until his death.

In 1995, Rogers was inducted into the Blues Hall of Fame. His song "That's All Right" was inducted by the organization in 2016 as a "Classic of Blues Recording", which identified it as a blues standard.

Rogers died of colon cancer in Chicago in 1997. He was survived by his son, Jimmy D. Lane, a guitarist, record producer and recording engineer for Blue Heaven Studios and APO Records.

== Discography ==
Singles

- "That's All Right" / "Ludella" (Chess 1435, 10/50)
- "Going Away Baby" / "Today, Today, Blues" (Chess 1442, 11/50)
- "The World is in a Tangle" / "She Loves Another Man" (Chess 1453, 3/51)
- "Money, Marbles and Chalk" / "Chance to Love" (Chess 1476, 8/51)
- "Back Door Friend" / "I Used to Have a Woman" (Chess 1506, 4/52)
- "The Last Time" / "Out on the Road" (Chess 1519, 9/52)
- "Left Me with a Broken Heart" / "Act Like You Love Me" (Chess 1543, 7/53)
- "Sloppy Drunk" / "Chicago Bound" (Chess 1574, 6/54)
- "You're the One" / "Blues All Day Long" (Chess 1616, 1/56)
- "Walking by Myself" / "If it Ain't Me (Who You Thinking Of)" (Chess 1643, 11/56)
- "I Can't Believe" / "One Kiss" (Chess 1659, 5/57)
- "What Have I Done" / "Trace of You" (Chess 1687, 3/58)
- "Rock This House" / "My Last Meal" (Chess 1721, 2/59)

Albums

- Chicago Bound (1970, Chess), compilation of 1950s Chess recordings
- Gold Tailed Bird (1971, Shelter)
- Sloppy Drunk (1973, Black & Blue), studio album recorded in 1973
- Jimmy Rogers (1984, Chess Masters series), 2-LP compilation with more 1950s Chess recordings
- That's All Right (1989, Charly), compilation of Chess recordings
- Ludella (1990, Antone's), studio and live recordings c. 1990
- Jimmy Rogers with Ronnie Earl and the Broadcasters (1993, CrossCut), live recording from 1991
- Feelin' Good (1994, Blind Pig), with Rod Piazza and the Mighty Flyers
- Blue Bird (1994, Analogue Productions), studio recording from 1993
- The Complete Chess Recordings (1997, Chess/MCA), 2-CD
- Blues Blues Blues (1999, Atlantic), as the "Jimmy Rogers All-Stars", with Mick Jagger, Keith Richards, Eric Clapton, Taj Mahal, Lowell Fulson, Jimmy Page, Robert Plant, Jeff Healey, Stephen Stills.
- His Best (2003, Chess/MCA)

== Sources ==
- Dahl, Bill (1996). "Jimmy Rogers". In Erlewine, Michael; Bogdanov, Vladimir; Woodstra, Chris; Koda, Cub (eds.). All Music Guide to the Blues. San Francisco: Miller Freeman Books. ISBN 0-87930-424-3.
- Darwen, Norman (1989). That's All Right (Album notes). Jimmy Rogers. London: Charly Records. CD RED 16.
- Eagle, Bob L.; LeBlanc, Eric S. (2013). Blues: A Regional Experience. Santa Barbara, California: Praeger. ISBN 978-0313344244.
- Gordon, Robert (2002). Can't Be Satisfied: The Life and Times of Muddy Waters. New York City: Little, Brown. ISBN 0-316-32849-9.
- Harris, S. (1979). Blues Who's Who. New York: Da Capo Press.
- Palmer, Robert (1982). Deep Blues. New York City: Penguin Books. ISBN 0-14006-223-8.
- Russell, Tony (1997). The Blues: From Robert Johnson to Robert Cray. Dubai: Carlton Books. p. 161. ISBN 1-85868-255-X.
- Whitburn, Joel (1988). "Jimmy Rogers". Top R&B Singles 1942–1988. Menomonee Falls, Wisconsin: Record Research. ISBN 0-89820-068-7.
