= Little Walter =

American blues harmonica player (1930–1968)

- Jacobs c.1956

Background information
- Born: Marion Walter Jacobs; May 1, 1930; Marksville, Louisiana, U.S.
- Died: February 15, 1968 (aged 37) Chicago, Illinois, U.S.
- Genres: Blues; Chicago blues; R&B
- Occupation: Musician
- Instruments: Harmonica; vocals; guitar
- Years active: 1945–1967
- Labels: Chess; Checker
- Website: littlewalterfoundation.org

Marion Walter Jacobs (May 1, 1930 – February 15, 1968), known as Little Walter, was an American blues musician, singer, and songwriter. His revolutionary approach to the harmonica had a strong impact on the succeeding generations, earning him comparisons to such seminal artists as Django Reinhardt, Charlie Parker and Jimi Hendrix. His virtuosity and musical innovations fundamentally altered many listeners' expectations of what was possible on blues harmonica. He was inducted into The Rock and Roll Hall of Fame in 2008, the first and, to date, only artist to be inducted specifically as a harmonica player.

== Biography ==
=== Early years ===
Jacobs' date of birth is usually given as May 1, 1930, in Marksville, Louisiana. He was born without a birth certificate and when he applied for a Social Security card in 1940, his birthdate was listed as May 1, 1923. Over the years he often gave different years, but May 1 was constant. In some other documents he filled out before reaching the age of the majority, he indicated birth years of 1925 and 1928, probably to appear to be of legal age to sign contracts for recordings and club work. After reaching the age of majority based on a birth year of 1930, he consistently gave his birth year as 1930. In the 1940 U.S. Census, his mother Beatrice reported his age at 14, making his birth year 1925.

He was raised in Rapides Parish, Louisiana, where he learned to play the harmonica. He quit school, and by the age of 12 had left rural Louisiana and travelled, working odd jobs and busking on the streets of New Orleans, Memphis, Helena and West Helena, Arkansas, and St. Louis. He honed his musical skills on harmonica and guitar, performing with older bluesmen including Sonny Boy Williamson II, Sunnyland Slim, Honeyboy Edwards, and others.

Arriving in Chicago in 1946, he occasionally found work as a guitarist but garnered more attention for his already highly developed harmonica playing. According to Chicago bluesman Floyd Jones, Little Walter's first recording was an unreleased demo recorded soon after he arrived in Chicago, on which Walter played guitar backing Jones. Reportedly frustrated with having his harmonica drowned out by electric guitars, Walter adopted a simple but previously little-used method: He cupped a small microphone in his hands along with his harmonica and plugged the microphone into a public address system or guitar amplifier. He could thus compete with any guitarist's volume. However, unlike other contemporary blues harp players, such as Sonny Boy Williamson I and Snooky Pryor, who had also started using the newly available amplifier technology around the same time solely for added volume, Walter purposely pushed his amplifiers beyond their intended technical limitations, using the amplification to explore and develop radical new timbres and sonic effects previously unheard from a harmonica or any other instrument.

=== Success ===
Jacobs made his first released recordings in 1947 for Bernard Abrams' tiny Ora-Nelle label, which operated out of the back room of Abrams' Maxwell Radio and Records store, in the heart of the Maxwell Street district in Chicago. These and several other of his early recordings, like many blues harp recordings of the era, owed a strong stylistic debt to the pioneering blues harmonica player Sonny Boy Williamson I (John Lee Williamson). Walter joined Muddy Waters' band in 1948, and by 1950 he was playing acoustic (unamplified) harmonica on Waters's recordings for Chess Records. The first appearance on record of Little Walter's amplified harmonica was on Waters' "Country Boy" (Chess 1952), recorded on July 11, 1951. For years after his departure from Waters' band in 1952, Chess continued to hire him to play on Waters' recording sessions, and as a result his harmonica is featured on most of Waters' classic recordings of the 1950s. As a guitarist, Little Walter recorded three songs for the small Parkway label with Waters and Baby Face Leroy Foster (reissued on CD by Delmark Records as The Blues World of Little Walter in 1993) and on a session for Chess backing pianist Eddie Ware. His guitar playing was also occasionally featured on early Chess sessions with Waters and Jimmy Rogers. In January 1952, talent scout Ike Turner tried to get Jacobs to record for Modern Records while in Helena, but Jacobs was on his way to Mississippi. They played together in Clarksdale.

Jacobs had put his career as a bandleader on hold when he joined Waters' band, but he stepped out front again when he recorded under his own name for Chess' subsidiary label Checker Records on May 12, 1952. The first completed take of the first song attempted at his debut session became his first number one hit, spending eight weeks at the top of the Billboard R&B chart. The song was "Juke", and it is still the only harmonica instrumental ever to be a number one hit on the Billboard R&B chart. The original title of the track file was "Your Cat Will Play", but was renamed at Leonard Chess' suggestion. (Three of his other harmonica instrumentals also made the Billboard R&B top 10 while "Juke" was still on the charts.: "Off the Wall" reached number eight, "Roller Coaster" reached number six, and "Sad Hours" reached number two.) "Juke" was the biggest hit to date for any artist on Chess and its affiliated labels and one of the biggest national R&B hits of 1952 securing Walter's position on the Chess artist roster for the next decade.

Walter had fourteen top ten hits on the Billboard R&B charts between 1952 and 1958, including two number one hits (the second being "My Babe" in 1955), a level of commercial success never achieved by Waters or by his fellow Chess blues artists Howlin' Wolf and Sonny Boy Williamson II. Following the pattern of "Juke", most of Little Walter's singles released in the 1950s featured a vocal performance on one side and a harmonica instrumental on the other. Walter or Chess A&R man Willie Dixon wrote many of his vocal numbers or they adapted them from earlier blues themes. In general, his sound was more modern and up tempo than the popular Chicago blues of the day. His harmonica phrasing was influenced by popular swing and saxophone players, rhythmically freer and less rigid than that of other, contemporary blues harmonica players.

Jacobs left Waters' band in 1952 and recruited his own backing band, the Aces, a group that was already working steadily in Chicago backing Junior Wells. The Aces, the brothers David and Louis Myers on guitars and Fred Below on drums, were credited as the Jukes on most of the Little Walter records on which they played. By 1955, the members of the Aces had each separately left Walter to pursue other opportunities and were initially replaced by the guitarists Robert "Junior" Lockwood and Luther Tucker and drummer Odie Payne. Among others who worked in Little Walter's recording and touring bands in the 1950s were the guitarists Jimmie Lee Robinson and Freddie Robinson, and drummer George Hunter. Little Walter also occasionally included saxophone players in his touring bands during this period, among them the young Albert Ayler, and Ray Charles on one early tour. By the late 1950s, Little Walter no longer employed a regular full-time band, instead hiring various players as needed from the large pool of blues musicians in Chicago.

Jacobs often played the harmonica on records by others in the Chess stable of artists, including Jimmy Rogers, John Brim, Rocky Fuller, Memphis Minnie, the Coronets, Johnny Shines, Floyd Jones, Bo Diddley, and Shel Silverstein. He also played on recordings for other labels, backing Otis Rush, Johnny "Man" Young, and Robert Nighthawk.

Jacobs suffered from alcoholism and had a notoriously short temper, which in the late 1950s led to violent altercations, minor scrapes with the law, and increasingly irresponsible behavior. This led to a decline in his fame and fortunes, beginning in the late 1950s. Nonetheless, he toured Europe twice, in 1964 and 1967, (the long-circulated story that he toured the United Kingdom with the Rolling Stones in 1964 has been refuted by Keith Richards). The 1967 European tour, as part of the American Folk Blues Festival, resulted in the only known film footage of Little Walter performing. Footage of him backing Hound Dog Taylor and Koko Taylor was shown on a television program in Copenhagen, Denmark, on October 11, 1967, and was released on DVD in 2004. Further video of another recently discovered television appearance in Germany during this same tour, showing Jacobs performing his songs "My Babe", "Mean Old World", and others, was released on DVD in Europe in January 2009; it is the only known footage of him singing. Other television appearances in the UK (in 1964) and the Netherlands (in 1967) have been documented, but no footage of these has yet been uncovered. Jacobs recorded and toured infrequently in the 1960s, playing mainly in and around Chicago.

=== Death ===
A few months after returning from his second European tour, Little Walter was involved in a fight while taking a break from a performance at a nightclub on the South Side of Chicago. He apparently sustained only minor injuries in this altercation, but they aggravated the damage he had suffered in previous violent encounters, and he died in his sleep at the apartment of a girlfriend, at 209 East 54th Street in Chicago, early the following morning. The official cause of death on his death certificate was coronary thrombosis (a blood clot in the heart). Evidence of external injuries was so insignificant that the police reported that his death was due to "unknown or natural causes", and no external injuries were noted on the death certificate. His body was buried at St. Mary's Cemetery, in Evergreen Park, Illinois, on February 22, 1968.

== Legacy ==
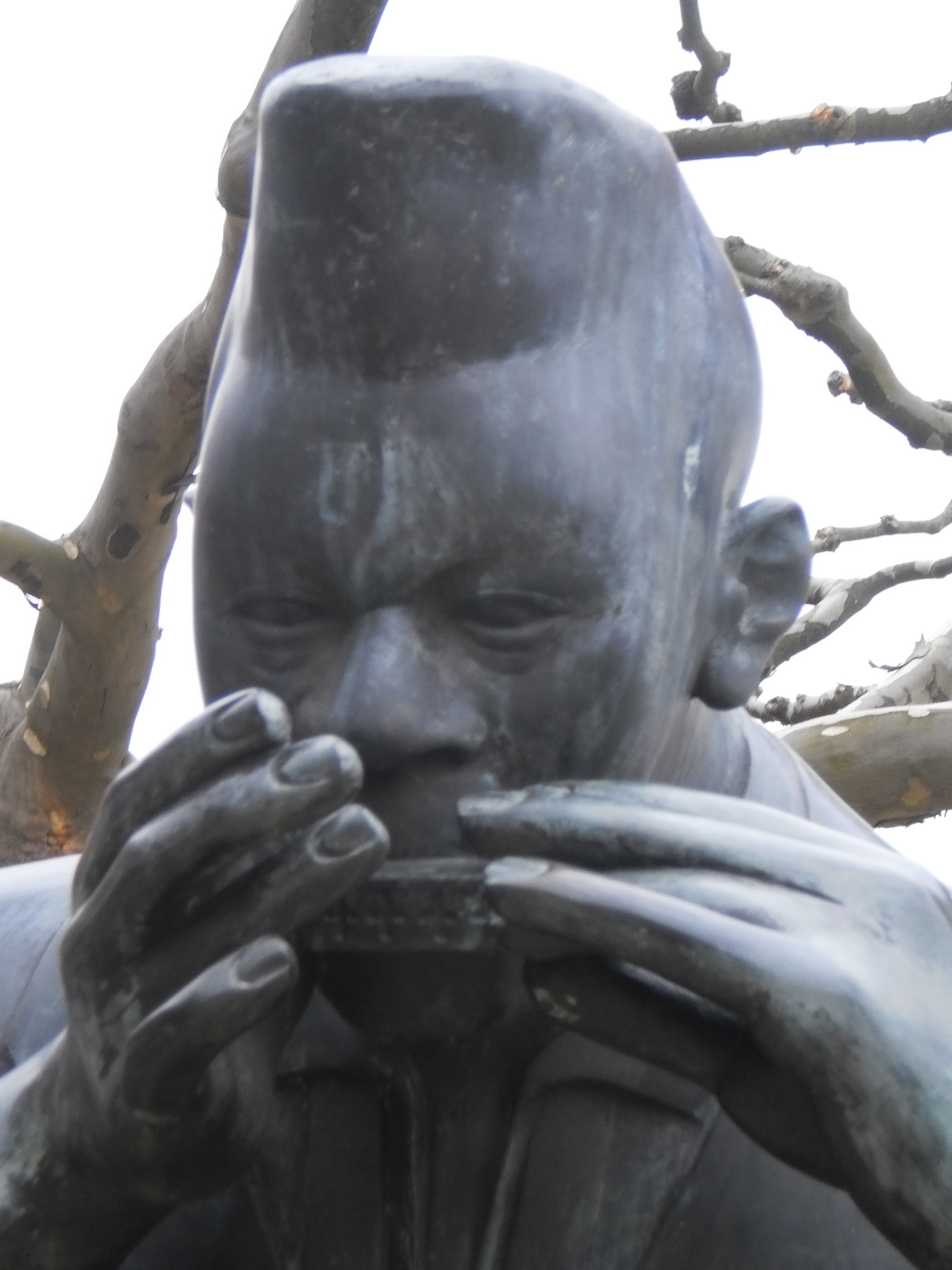
A statue of Little Walter at Jazzinstitut Darmstadt in Bessungen, Germany

The music journalist Bill Dahl described Little Walter as "king of all post-war blues harpists", who "took the humble mouth organ in dazzling amplified directions that were unimaginable prior to his ascendancy." His legacy has been enormous. He is widely credited by blues historians as the artist primarily responsible for establishing the standard vocabulary for modern blues and blues rock harmonica players. Biographer Tony Glover notes Little Walter directly influenced Junior Wells, James Cotton, George "Harmonica" Smith, and Carey Bell. He includes Jerry Portnoy, Mark Hummel, Rick Estrin of Little Charlie & the Nightcats, Kim Wilson, Paul Butterfield, Brian Jones and Mick Jagger of The Rolling Stones, Rod Piazza, Lester Butler of Red Devils fame, and William Clarke among those who later studied his technique and helped popularize it with younger players.

Little Walter's daughter, Marion Diaz Reacco, established the Little Walter Foundation in Chicago, to "carry on the legacy and genius of her father's music". The foundation aims to create programs for the creative arts, including music, animation and video.

== Awards and recognition ==
- 1986 – Blues Hall of Fame: "Juke" (Classics of Blues Recordings – Singles or Album Tracks)
- 1991 – Blues Hall of Fame: The Best of Little Walter (Classics of Blues Recordings – Albums)
- 1995 – Rock and Roll Hall of Fame: "Juke" (500 Songs That Shaped Rock and Roll)
- 2008 – Grammy Awards: "Juke" (Grammy Hall of Fame Award)
- 2008 – Rock and Roll Hall of Fame: Little Walter inducted (Sideman category)
- 2008 – Blues Hall of Fame: "My Babe" (Classics of Blues Recordings — Singles or Album Tracks)
- 2009 – Grammy Awards: The Complete Chess Masters (1950–1967) (Best Historical Album)
- 2010 – Rolling Stone: The Best of Little Walter (number 198 on its list of "The 500 Greatest Albums of All Time")

== Discography ==
- The Best of Little Walter (1958)
- Boss Blues Harmonica (1972)
- The Essential Little Walter (1993)
- His Best: The Chess 50th Anniversary Collection (1997)
- The Complete Chess Masters (1950–1967) (2009)
