= Blue Serge =

Studio album by Serge Chaloff
- Released: 1956
- Recorded: March 14 & 16, 1956
- Studio: Capitol Studios
- Genre: Jazz
- Length: 41:33
- Label: Capitol
- Producer: Bill Miller

Serge Chaloff chronology
| Boston Blow–Up! (1955) | Blue Serge (1956) |

Alternative cover
- 2004 Definitive Records re-release

Blue Serge is an album by jazz baritone saxophonist Serge Chaloff, and released by Capitol Records in 1956. It was recorded on March 14 and 16, 1956 at Capitol Studios in Los Angeles, California.

== Reception ==
Professional ratings
Review scores
| Source | Rating |
|---|---|
| All Music Guide to Jazz | (favorable) |
| Penguin Guide to Jazz | (Core Collection) |
| Allmusic.com | 4/5 stars |
| The Rolling Stone Jazz Record Guide | 5/5 stars |

David Szatmary, writing for All Music Guide to Jazz, described Blue Serge as "[a]n indispensable session by one of the great underrated baritone sax players...."

Richard Cook and Brian Morton of The Penguin Guide to Jazz wrote, "Chaloff's masterpiece is both vigorous and moving, not for the knowledge that he was so near his own death but for the unsentimental rigour of the playing. 'Thanks for the Memory' is overpoweringly beautiful as Chaloff creates a series of melodic variations which match the improviser's ideal of fashioning an entirely new song. 'Stairway to the Stars' is almost as fine, and the thoughtful 'The Goof and I' and 'Susie's Blues' show that Chaloff still had plenty of ideas about what could be done with a bebopper's basic materials. This important session has retained all its power." The Penguin Guide includes both Blue Serge and the Definitive Records pairing of Blue Serge with Boston Blow–Up! as part of its suggested "Core Collection," and gives both releases a four-star rating (of a possible four).

Scott Yanow, writing for Allmusic.com, described Blue Serge as Chaloff's best recording, noting that the saxophonist had already contracted spinal paralysis. But Chaloff's biographer records that he was seemingly healthy until the following May, when he was struck down by back and abdominal pains - the first symptoms of his cancer

== Track listing ==
| No. | Title | Writer(s) | Length |
|---|---|---|---|
| 1. | "A Handful of Stars" | Lawrence, Shapiro | 5:33 |
| 2. | "The Goof and I" | Cohn | 4:45 |
| 3. | "Thanks for the Memory" | Rainger, Robin | 3:46 |
| 4. | "All the Things You Are" | Hammerstein, Kern | 5:24 |
| 5. | "I've Got the World on a String" | Arlen, Koehler | 6:44 |
| 6. | "Susie's Blues" | Chaloff | 5:08 |
| 7. | "Stairway to the Stars" | Malneck, Parish, Signorelli | 4:50 |
| 8. | "How About You?" | Freed, Heusen, Lane | 5:23 |

== Personnel ==
- Serge Chaloff – baritone saxophone
- Sonny Clark – piano
- Philly Joe Jones – drums
- Leroy Vinnegar – bass

== Release history ==
In 2004, Definitive Records released Blue Serge and Boston Blow Up! together on a single CD, which presented the tracks in reverse chronological order of recording.

| Region | Date | Label | Format | Catalog |
|---|---|---|---|---|
| United States | 1956 | Capitol | LP | |
| European Union | 2004 | Definitive | single CD with Blue Serge and Boston Blow Up! | DRCD11261 |
| United States | 1998 | Blue Note | CD | |
