= Nexxen =

Advertising company

- Formerly: Tremor International Ltd., Marimedia, Taptica
- Type: Public
- Traded as: Nasdaq: NEXN; AIM: NEXN
- Industry: Advertising
- Founded: 2007; 19 years ago, in Israel
- Headquarters: New York, United States
- Area served: Worldwide
- Key people: Ofer Druker (CEO); Yaniv Carmi (COO); Sagi Niri (CFO)
- Number of employees: 800
- Subsidiaries: Tremor Video, Unruly, Tr.ly, Spearad, Amobee, AllMusic, AllMovie, SideReel
- Website: https://nexxen.com/

Nexxen (formerly Tremor International Ltd.) is a New York-based, publicly traded online advertising company. Founded in 2007, it focuses on digital advertising, including video, mobile, native advertising, and display technology and connected TV. Its stock trades on both the Nasdaq and London Stock Exchange under the ticker symbol NEXN. The company employs over 800 people across 19 offices globally.

== History ==
Nexxen was founded as Marimedia in 2007 by Maia Shiran and Ariel Cababie and focused on digital advertising monetization. Its principal technology platform Ad$Gadget launched in 2011.

In November 2010, Hagai Tal and Ehud Levy acquired 50% of the company, with Hagai Tal becoming chief executive office in December 2013. Levy was also a director and investor at Taptica, a mobile advertising technology company from which Marimedia would later take its name.

In 2014, Marimedia acquired Taptica, a mobile advertising technology company, and to fund this acquisition, the company listed on AIM in London, raising £17.9 million. The following year, Marimedia rebranded as Taptica.

In September 2015, the company acquired social marketing tech company AreaOne. In 2016, Taptica acquired 57% of Japan-based Adinnovation for $5.7 million. In 2017, Taptica acquired Tremor Video's demand-side platform for $50 million, a company from which they would later take their name.

In December 2018, Hagai Tal stepped down as CEO after a US court ruled that he had concealed material facts during the sale of Plimus in 2011.

In February 2019 Taptica merged with RhythmOne. Both companies were listed on the stock exchange, so Taptica retained its listing and RhythmOne shares were converted into Taptica shares. Ofer Druker was announced in April 2019 as the CEO of the combined entity. In June 2019 Taptica renamed itself to Tremor International. In 2020, the combined company acquired video ad platform, Unruly, from News Corp. In September of 2022, Tremor International closed on the acquisition of Amobee for $239M.

Tremor International rebranded as Nexxen in 2023.

=== Services ===
Nexxen provides a tech platform that helps advertisers and publishers improve programmatic advertising performance.
