= Boston Blow–Up! =

Studio album by Serge Chaloff
- Released: 1955
- Recorded: April 4–5, 1955; Capitol Studios; New York, NY, USA
- Genre: Jazz
- Label: Capitol
- Producer: Stan Kenton

Serge Chaloff chronology
Serge Chaloff and Boots Mussulli (1954)	Boston Blow–Up! (1955)	Blue Serge (1956)

Alternative cover
- 2004 Definitive Records re-release

Boston Blow–Up! is an album by jazz baritone saxophonist Serge Chaloff. Capitol Records released the album in 1955. It was recorded on April 4 and 5, 1955 at Capitol Studios in New York City. Stan Kenton produced the album as part of his "Kenton Presents" series.

== Reception ==
Professional ratings
Review scores
Source	Rating
All Music Guide to Jazz	(favorable)
Penguin Guide to Jazz	(Core Collection) (combined with Blue Serge)
Allmusic.com	3/5 stars

David Szatmary, writing for the All Music Guide to Jazz, describes Boston Blow–Up! as a "swinging, boppish session from a musician who was once a mainstay of Woody Herman's band."

Richard Cook and Brian Morton of The Penguin Guide to Jazz include the Definitive Records pairing of Blue Serge with Boston Blow–Up! as part of a suggested "Core Collection", and give the combined release a four-star rating (of a possible four). The Penguin Guide notes that while Boston Blow-Up! is less exciting than Blue Serge, its rendition of "Body and Soul" is "scorching".

Scott Yanow, writing for Allmusic.com, describes Boston Blow–Up! as an "excellent session" on which Chaloff "is very much in prime form".

== Track listing ==
All music is composed by Boots Mussulli, except where noted.

No.	Title	Length
1.	"Bob the Robin"	2:36
2.	"Yesterday's Gardenias" (Nelson Cogane, Sammy Mysels, Dick Robertson)	4:40
3.	"Sergical"	3:12
4.	"What's New?" (Burke, Haggart)	3:39
5.	"Mar-Dros"	3:22
6.	"J.R."	4:19
7.	"Body and Soul" (Eyton, Green, Heyman, Sour)	3:50
8.	"Kip"	3:20
9.	"Diane's Melody" (Byard)	1:40
10.	"Unison"	3:16
11.	"Boomareemaroja"	3:44
12.	"Herbs [Long Take]" (Pomeroy)	4:20
13.	"Herbs" (Pomeroy)	3:30

== Personnel ==
- Serge Chaloff – baritone saxophone
- Everett Evans – bass
- Boots Mussulli – alto saxophone
- Herb Pomeroy – trumpet
- Ray Santisi – piano
- Jimmy Zitano – drums

== Release history ==
Boston Blow-Up! was once available on CD only as part of a Mosaic Records box set. In 2004, Definitive Records released Blue Serge and Boston Blow–Up! together on a single CD, which presented the tracks in reverse chronological order of recording. In 2006, Capitol Jazz released Boston Blow–Up! with three extra tracks.

Region	Date	Label	Format	Catalog
United States	1955	Capitol Records	LP	
United States		Mosaic Records	box set (CD and LP)	
European Union	2004	Definitive Records	single CD with Blue Serge and Boston Blow–Up!	DRCD11261
United States	2006	Blue Note Records	CD	
