= Ron Wynn =

American music critic

- Occupations: Music critic, author, editor
- Writing career
- Language: English
- Subjects: Jazz; Rhythm and blues; Rock and roll; Pop music
- Notable works: AllMusic; The All Music Guide to Jazz; The Tina Turner Story

Ron Wynn is a music critic, author, and AllMusic editor. Wynn was the editor of the first edition of The All Music Guide to Jazz (1994), and from 1993 to 1994 served as the jazz and rap editor of the All Music Guide. Wynn is the former editor of New Memphis Star and the former chief jazz and pop music critic for Bridgeport Post-Telegram and Memphis Commercial Appeal. Wynn has contributed to publications such as Billboard, The Village Voice, Creem, Rock & Roll Disc, Living Blues, The Boston Phoenix, and Rejoice. He is the author of The Tina Turner Story. Wynn has contributed liner notes for numerous albums. His liner notes for The Soul of Country Music received a 1998 Grammy nomination.

== Awards and nominations ==
Year	Nominee / work	Award	Result	Ref.
1998	From Where I Stand: The Black Experience In Country Music	Grammy Award for Best Album Notes	Nominated	
