= Chet Baker in Europe =

Studio album by Chet Baker
- Released: 1956
- Recorded: October 11 & 24, 1955; Paris, France
- Genre: Jazz
- Label: Pacific Jazz; PJ 1218
- Producer: Richard Bock

Chet Baker chronology
Chet Baker Sings and Plays (1955)	Chet Baker in Europe (1956)	The Route (1956)

Chet Baker in Europe (subtitled A Jazz Tour of the NATO Countries) is an album by jazz trumpeter Chet Baker drawn from sessions recorded in Paris in 1955 for Barclay Records and released in the U.S. on the Pacific Jazz label. One side consists largely of compositions by Bob Zieff, which pianist Dick Twardzik had introduced to Baker's repertoire; the other side consists of standards, recorded with a different quartet after Twardzik's death from a heroin overdose.

== Reception ==
Professional ratings
Review scores
Source	Rating
Allmusic	3/5 stars

Allmusic rated the album with 3 stars.

== Track listing ==
1. "Summertime" (DuBose Heyward, George Gershwin, Ira Gershwin) - 4:16
2. "You Go to My Head" (Haven Gillespie, J. Fred Coots) - 5:54
3. "Tenderly" (Jack Lawrence, Walter Gross) - 6:39
4. "Autumn in New York" (Vernon Duke) - 7:06
5. "There's a Small Hotel" (Lorenz Hart, Richard Rodgers) - 3:48
6. "Rondette" (Bob Zieff) - 2:11
7. "Piece Caprice" (Zieff) - 5:12
8. "Mid-Forte" (Zieff) - 3:08
9. "Pomp" (Zieff) - 4:42
10. "Sad Walk" (Zieff) - 4:14
11. "The Girl from Greenland" (Richard Twardzik) - 5:16
- Recorded in Paris, France, on October 11 (tracks 6, 8, 10), October 14 (tracks 7, 9, 11), and October 24 (tracks 1–5), 1955

== Personnel ==
- Chet Baker - trumpet
- Dick Twardzik (tracks 6–11), Gérard Gustin (tracks 1–5) - piano
- Jimmy Bond - bass
- Nils-Bertil Dahlander (tracks 1–5), Peter Littman (tracks 6–11) - drums
