= Julius Chaloff =

American pianist and composer (1892–1979)

Julius Chaloff (September 2, 1892 – October 28, 1979) was an American pianist and composer. Born of Russian parentage in Boston, Massachusetts, he was the son of Cantor Israel Chaloff, of Congregation Ohabei Shalom, then located in Boston. In 1919, he married a fellow musician, Margaret Stedman. Chaloff was the father of jazz baritone saxophonist Serge Chaloff. Serge gained his earliest prominence as a member of Woody Herman's second herd also known as the Four Brothers. Chaloff was also father of Richard Stedman Chaloff Sr. who founded Stedman Ltd. of Brookline, one of the first custom audio / video installation businesses in the country. Chaloff was married to piano instructor Madame Margaret Chaloff, née Stedman, whose students included Dick Twardzik, Keith Jarrett, Kenny Werner, Chick Corea, Herbie Hancock, Mulgrew Miller, Toshiko Akiyoshi, and Steve Kuhn.

As a child, Chaloff showed exceptional musical talent, and at the age of eleven entered the New England Conservatory of Music, studying piano with Alfred Devoto. He studied at this institution for six years and was the youngest student to receive a diploma, graduating with high honors at the age of 17. During the senior year he won the first Mason and Hamlin prize piano contest, the judges being George W. Chadwick, Charles Martin Loeffler, and Dr. Max Fiedler.

Chaloff spent many years in Europe, four of which were spent in Berlin where he worked with the Polish pianist Ignaz Friedman. He also composed and conducted with Hugo Kaun. His debut in Berlin with the Blüthner Orchestra, January 18, 1913, was a marked success.

In 1913, Charles F. Stoddard invented the reproducing piano of the American Piano Company (Ampico). This instrument preserved for posterity the artistry of the golden era of great piano virtuosi. Almost all of the eminent concert pianists of the US, including Rachmaninoff, Lhevinne, and Julius Chaloff recorded for the Ampico. A few of the compositions that have been preserved onto a very rare and limited number of LPs which were recorded by Julius Chaloff are:

- Prelude, Fugue and Variation by Caesar Franck
- Barcarolle in F sharp major, Op. 60 by Chopin
- Ballade in F minor, Op. 52, No. 4 by Chopin
- Nocturne in D flat major by Debussy
- Viennese Dance, No. 1, in G flat major by Friedman-Gartner
- Memories, Op. 14, No. 1 by Chaloff
- Elle Danse by Friedman
- Islamey (Oriental Fantasie) by Balakirev
