= Al Cohn's Tones =

Studio album by Al Cohn
- Released: 1956
- Recorded: July 29, 1950 and June 23, 1953
- Studio: New York City and Van Gelder Studio, Hackensack, NJ
- Genre: Jazz
- Length: 32:18
- Label: Savoy; MG 12048
- Producer: Gus Statiras

Al Cohn chronology
Al Cohn's Tones (1956)	East Coast-West Coast Scene (1954)

Al Cohn's Tones (also released as The Progressive Al Cohn) is an album by American saxophonist, composer, and arranger Al Cohn comprising two sessions, one recorded in 1950 and the other from 1953, which was released on the Savoy label in 1956.

== Reception ==
The AllMusic review by Stephen Cook stated, "Backed by some of the top bop players of the day, Al Cohn stretches out here for a program heavy with up-tempo swingers. [...] this early Cohn release is at once hot and cool, vigorous and lithe".

Professional ratings
Review scores
Source	Rating
AllMusic	4/5 stars

== Track listing ==
All compositions by Al Cohn except where noted

1. "I'm Tellin' Ya" – 5:58
2. "Jane Street" – 4:37
3. "Infinity" – 2:57
4. "How Long Has This Been Going On?" (George Gershwin, Ira Gershwin) – 3:13
5. "That's What You Think" – 4:50
6. "Ah Moore" – 4:57
7. "Groovin' With Gus" – 2:36
8. "Let's Get Away from It All" (Matt Dennis, Tom Adair) – 3:10

== Personnel ==
- Al Cohn – tenor saxophone
- Nick Travis – trumpet (tracks 1, 2, 5, 6)
- Horace Silver (tracks 1, 2, 5, 6), George Wallington (tracks 3, 4, 7, 8) – piano
- Tommy Potter (tracks 3, 4, 7, 8), Curly Russell (tracks 1, 2, 5, 6) – bass
- Tiny Kahn (tracks 1, 2, 5, 6), Max Roach (tracks 3, 4, 7, 8) – drums
