= Schwann Catalog =

Cover of December 1984 "35th Anniversary" Schwann catalog, featuring Leonard Bernstein, Frank Zappa, Cyndi Lauper, and Sadao Watanabe

The Schwann Catalog (previously Schwann Long Playing Record Catalog or later Schwann Record And Tape Guide) was a catalog of recordings started by William Schwann in 1949. The first edition was hand-typed and 26 pages long, and it listed 674 long-playing records (see LP record). By the late 1970s, over 150,000 record albums had been listed in Schwann. The company was honored by the record industry both at the 25th anniversary (1974) and 35th anniversary (1984).

The Schwann Catalog changed hands several times, sold in 1976, then again in the late 1980s to Stereophile, then to Valley Media in the 1990s. In 2002, the company was purchased at a bankruptcy auction by Alliance Entertainment Corporation.

== Content ==
The Schwann Catalog initially focused on classical LPs, but also included sections on popular music, jazz, musical shows, "Spoken and Misc.", and so on. By the 1970s the catalog was split into two volumes: the monthly Schwann-1 included all stereo classical and jazz recordings and stereo popular albums less than two years old, while the semi-annual Schwann-2 included all monaural albums, older pop recordings, and spoken word and miscellaneous albums. In May 1986, the publication became known as the Schwann Compact Disc Catalog. Later, the catalog split into Schwann Opus for classical music and Schwann Spectrum for categories such as pop, rock, country, jazz, religious, spoken word and international music.

The early editions indexed and reviewed LPs that contained the same classical works. As the volume of music it catalogued grew, the amount of information for each entry was reduced to a single line.

== See also ==
- All Music Guide to the Blues
- All Music Guide to Jazz
- List of online encyclopedias
- List of online music databases
- Phonolog
