= The Rolling Stone Album Guide =

Book of music reviews

The Rolling Stone Record Guide
- First edition
- Author: Dave Marsh and John Swenson (Editors)
- Subject: Music; Popular music; Discography; Sound recording; Reviews
- Publisher: Random House/Rolling Stone Press
- Publication date: 1979
- Media type: Hardcover / paperback
- Pages: 631
- ISBN: 0-394-41096-3
- OCLC: 5353861
- Dewey Decimal: 789.9/136/4
- LC Class: ML156.4.P6 M37

The Rolling Stone Album Guide, previously known as The Rolling Stone Record Guide, is a book that contains professional music reviews written and edited by staff members from the magazine Rolling Stone. Its first edition was published in 1979 and its last in 2004.

== First edition (1979) ==
The Rolling Stone Record Guide was the first edition of what would later become The Rolling Stone Album Guide. It was edited by Dave Marsh (who wrote a large majority of the reviews) and John Swenson, and included contributions from 34 other music critics. It is divided into sections by musical genre and then lists artists alphabetically within their respective genres. Albums are also listed alphabetically by artist although some of the artists have their careers divided into chronological periods.

Dave Marsh, in his Introduction, cites as precedents Leonard Maltin's book TV movies and Robert Christgau's review column in the Village Voice. He gives Phonolog and Schwann's Records & Tape Guide as raw sources of information.

The first edition included black and white photographs of many of the covers of albums which received five star reviews. These titles are listed together in the Five-Star Records section, which is coincidentally five pages in length.

The edition also included reviews for many comedy artists including Lenny Bruce, Lord Buckley, Bill Cosby, The Firesign Theatre, Spike Jones, and Richard Pryor.

Comedy artists were listed in the catch-all section "Rock, Soul, Country and Pop", which included the genres of folk (Carter Family, Woody Guthrie, Leadbelly), bluegrass (Bill Monroe), funk (The Meters, Parliament-Funkadelic), and reggae (Toots & the Maytals, Peter Tosh), as well as comedy. Traditional pop performers were not included (e.g. Andrews Sisters, Tony Bennett, Perry Como, Bing Crosby, Peggy Lee, Rudy Vallee, Lawrence Welk), with the notable exceptions of Frank Sinatra and Nat King Cole. (Dave Marsh justified this decision in his Introduction.)

Included too were some difficult-to-classify artists (e.g. Osibisa, Yma Sumac, Urubamba) who might now be considered as world music. (Ethnic music was the normal term in 1979.)

Big band jazz was handled selectively, with certain band leaders omitted (e.g. Tommy Dorsey, Glenn Miller, Paul Whiteman), while others were included (e.g. Count Basie, Cab Calloway, Duke Ellington, Benny Goodman). Many other styles of jazz did appear in the Jazz section.

The book was notable for the time in the provocative, "in your face" style of many of its reviews. For example, writing about Neil Young's song, "Down by the River", John Swenson described it both as an "FM radio classic" (p. 425), and as a "wimp anthem" (p. 244). His colleague, Dave Marsh, in reviewing the three albums of the jazz fusion group Chase, gave a one-word review: "Flee." Marsh's review of a then-current rock band called Platypus stated simply: "Lays eggs."

=== Table of contents ===
- Introduction
- Rock, Soul, Country and Pop
- Blues
- Jazz
- Gospel
- Anthologies, Soundtracks and Original Casts
- Five-Star Records
- Glossary
- Selected Bibliography

=== Rating system ===
The guide employs a five star rating scale with the following descriptions of those ratings:

  - Indispensable: a record that must be included in any comprehensive collection
  - Excellent: a record of substantial merit, though flawed in some essential way.
  - Good: a record of average worth, but one that might possess considerable appeal for fans of a particular style.
  - Mediocre: a record that is artistically insubstantial, though not truly wretched.
  - Poor: a record where even technical competence is at question or it was remarkably ill-conceived.
  - Worthless: a record that need never (or should never) have been created. Reserved for the most bathetic bathwater. (A square bullet (▪) marked this rating, as opposed to stars for the others.)

=== Reviewers ===
- Dave Marsh
- John Swenson
- Billy Altman
- Bob Blumenthal
- Georgia Christgau
- Jean-Charles Costa
- Chet Flippo
- Russell Gersten
- Mikal Gilmore
- Alan E. Goodman
- Peter Herbst
- Stephen Holden
- Martha Hume
- Gary Kenton
- Bruce Malamut
- Greil Marcus
- Ira Mayer
- Joe McEwen
- David McGee
- John Milward
- Teri Morris
- John Morthland
- Paul Nelson
- Alan Niester
- Rob Patterson
- Kit Rachlis
- Wayne Robbins
- Frank Rose
- Michael Rozek
- Fred Schruers
- Tom Smucker
- Ariel Swartley
- Ken Tucker
- Charley Walters^{[1]}

== Second edition (1983) ==
The New Rolling Stone Record Guide
- Author: Dave Marsh and John Swenson (Editors)
- Subject: Music, popular music, discography, sound recording, reviews
- Publisher: Random House/Rolling Stone Press
- Publication date: 1983
- Media type: Paperback
- Pages: 648
- ISBN: 0-394-72107-1

The New Rolling Stone Record Guide was an update of 1979's The Rolling Stone Record Guide. Like the first edition, it was edited by Marsh and Swenson. It included contributions from 52 music critics and featured chronological album listings under the name of each artist. In many cases, updates from the first edition consist of short, one-sentence verdicts upon an artist's later work.

Instead of having separate sections such as Blues and Gospel, this edition compressed all of the genres it reviewed into one section except for Jazz titles which were removed for this edition and were later expanded and published in 1985 Rolling Stone Jazz Record Guide (ed. Swenson). Besides adding reviews for many emerging punk and New Wave bands, this edition also added or expanded a significant number of reviews of long-established reggae and ska artists (such as U-Roy, Prince Buster, Ijahman, et al.).

Since the goal of this guide was to review records that were in print at the time of publication, this edition featured a list of artists who were included in the first edition but were not included in the second edition because all of their material was out of print. This edition also dispensed with the album cover photos found in the first edition.

=== Table of contents ===
- Introduction to the Second Edition
- Introduction to the First Edition
- Ratings
- Reviewers
- Record Label Abbreviations
- Rock, Soul, Blues, Country, Gospel and Pop
- Anthologies, Soundtracks and Original Cast
- Index to Artists in the First Edition (omitted in this second edition)

=== Rating system ===
The second edition uses exactly the same rating system as the first edition, the only difference being that in addition to a rating, the second edition also employs the pilcrow mark (¶) to indicate a title that was out of print at the time the guide was published. Many albums had their rating revised from the first edition; some artists had their ratings lowered (notably The Doors, Yes and Neil Young) as the book now offered a revisionist slant to rock's history, whilst others, such as Little Feat and Richard Hell And The Voidoids, garnered higher ratings from a re-evaluation of their work.^{[2]}

=== Reviewers ===
- Dave Marsh
- John Swenson
- Billy Altman
- George Arthur
- Lester Bangs
- Bob Blumenthal
- J.D. Considine
- Jean-Charles Costa
- Brian Cullman
- Dan Doyle
- Jim Farber
- Laura Fissinger
- Chet Flippo
- David Fricke
- Aaron Fuchs
- Steve Futterman
- Debbie Geller
- Russell Gersten
- Mikal Gilmore
- Alan E. Goodman
- Randall Grass
- Malu Halasa
- Peter Herbst
- Stephen Holden
- Martha Hume
- Scott Isler
- Gary Kenton
- Wayne King
- Kenn Lowy
- Bruce Malamut
- Greil Marcus
- Ira Mayer
- Joe McEwen
- David McGee
- John Milward
- Teri Morris
- John Morthland
- Paul Nelson
- Alan Niester
- Rob Patterson
- Kit Rachlis
- Ira Robbins
- Wayne Robbins
- Frank Rose
- Michael Rozek
- Fred Schruers
- Dave Schulpas
- Tom Smucker
- Ariel Swartley
- Bart Testa
- Ken Tucker
- Charley Walters^{[2]}

== The Rolling Stone Jazz Record Guide (1985) ==
The Rolling Stone Jazz Record Guide
- Author: John Swenson (Editor)
- Subject: Music, jazz, discography, sound recording, reviews
- Publisher: Random House/Rolling Stone Press
- Publication date: 1985
- Media type: Paperback
- Pages: 219
- ISBN: 0-394-72643-X

The Rolling Stone Jazz Record Guide was published in 1985 and incorporated the jazz listings omitted from The New Rolling Stone Record Guide with additional reviews edited by John Swenson. It included contributions from 16 music critics and featured alphabetical album listings under the name of each artist.

=== Table of contents ===
- Foreword
- Preface
- Ratings
- Contributors
- Record Label Abbreviations
- Reviews
- Bibliography

=== Rating system ===
This jazz edition uses the same rating system as the first two editions.

=== Contributors ===
- John Swenson
- Bob Blumenthal
- Jean-Charles Costa
- Steve Futterman
- Russell Gersten
- Mikal Gilmore
- Alan E. Goodman
- Fred Goodman
- Stephen Holden
- Ashley Kahn
- Bruce Malamut
- Joe McEwen
- Michael Rozek
- Andy Rowan
- Bart Testa
- Charley Walters

== Third edition (1992) ==
The Rolling Stone Album Guide
- Author: Anthony DeCurtis and James Henke, with Holly George-Warren (Editors)
- Subject: Music, popular music, discography, sound recording, reviews
- Publisher: Random House
- Publication date: 1992
- Media type: Paperback
- Pages: 838
- ISBN: 0-679-73729-4

The Rolling Stone Album Guide was a complete rewrite of both 1979's The Rolling Stone Record Guide and 1983's The New Rolling Stone Record Guide. The title change reflects the fact that by the time this edition was published in 1992, records were almost completely replaced by cassettes and CDs. This edition employs three new editors and reduces the number of reviewers from more than 50 as seen in previous editions to a mere four. This edition also included reviews of Jazz albums, which had been removed from the previous edition for the sake of publishing a separate Jazz guide. Unlike both previous editions, this edition did not include comedy artists.

=== Table of contents ===
- Introduction
- Ratings
- Contributors
- The Rolling Stone Album Guide
- Anthologies
- Soundtracks
- Acknowledgments

=== Rating system ===
Similar to the first edition, it employed a five star rating scale (without the "zero stars" (▪) rating), but this edition had new definitions of what the number of stars meant, and employed the use of 1/2 stars in the reviews. The descriptions of the markings used in the third edition of the guide are:

  - Classic: Albums in this category are essential listening for anyone interested in the artist under discussion or the style of music that artist's work represents.
  - Excellent: Four star albums represent peak performances in an artist's career. Generally speaking, albums that are granted four or more stars constitute the best introductions to an artist's work for listeners who are curious.
  - Average to Good: Albums in the three-star range will primarily be of interest to established fans of the artist being discussed. This mid-range, by its very nature, requires the most discretion on the part of the consumer.
  - Fair to Poor: Albums in the two-star category either fall below an artist's established standard or are, in and of themselves, failures.
  - Disastrous: Albums in the range of one star or less are wastes of vital resources. Only masochists or completists need apply.

=== Reviewers ===
- Mark Coleman
- J.D. Considine
- Paul Evans
- David McGee^{[3]}

=== Artists omitted from the third edition ===
Some of the artists included in the previous editions but omitted in this edition include:

- Kevin Coyne
- Dexys Midnight Runners
- Roy Harper
- Hawkwind
- Japan
- Magma
- Mickey Newbury
- Olivia Newton-John
- Pearls Before Swine
- Pere Ubu
- The Pretty Things
- The Red Krayola
- Scorpions
- Slade
- Steeleye Span
- Three Dog Night
- Van der Graaf Generator
- John Williams

== The Rolling Stone Jazz & Blues Album Guide (1999) ==
The Rolling Stone Jazz & Blues Album Guide was first published by Random House in 1999, with John Swenson as the editor.

Reviewing the book for All About Jazz, C. Michael Bailey regarded it as a consolidation of the 1985 jazz guide and the blues coverage from other Rolling Stone guides. He recommended it to novices, calling it "a worthy addition to any serious jazz/blues collector's library", even though it was not as comprehensive as The Penguin Guide to Jazz or All Music Guide to Jazz, in his opinion.

== Fourth edition (2004) ==
The New Rolling Stone Album Guide
- Author: Nathan Brackett with Christian Hoard (editors)
- Subject: More than 10,000 of the best rock, pop, hip-hop and soul records, reviewed and rated
- Publisher: Fireside
- Publication date: 2004
- Media type: Paperback
- Pages: 838
- ISBN: 0-7432-0169-8

Approximately 70 writers contributed to this edition. Text on the back cover of the fourth edition claims that the guide had been "completely updated and revised to include the past decade's artists and sounds", and offered "biographical overviews of key artists' careers, giving readers a look at the personalities behind the music".

=== Artists omitted from the fourth edition ===
Some of the artists included in the previous guides but omitted in this edition include:

- Joan Armatrading
- Louis Armstrong
- Aztec Camera
- Blake Babies
- Bread
- Captain Beefheart
- Joe Cocker
- Nat King Cole
- Crowded House
- Robert Cray
- Culture
- The Damned
- Deep Purple
- John Denver
- The Doobie Brothers (omitted from first printing, but added later)
- Dr. Feelgood
- Duke Ellington
- Donald Fagen
- Ella Fitzgerald
- Emerson, Lake and Palmer
- GTR
- The Gun Club
- Janis Ian
- Incredible String Band
- Grace Jones
- Loggins and Messina
- Robert Johnson
- Wynton Marsalis
- Meat Puppets
- Metallica (omitted from first printing, but added later)
- Mike and the Mechanics
- The Alan Parsons Project
- Pentangle
- The Raspberries
- The Saints
- Soft Machine
- Sparks
- Suicide
- Talk Talk
- Tears for Fears
- Thompson Twins
- Toto
- Uriah Heep

== See also ==
- Album era
- Christgau's Record Guide: Rock Albums of the Seventies
- Christgau's Record Guide: The '80s
- Rockism and poptimism
- Spin Alternative Record Guide

== Citations ==
1. ^{a} The Rolling Stone Record Guide. Ed. Dave Marsh and John Swenson. New York: Random House, 1979. (Note 1, see p xiii) (Note 1a, see p xv-xvi)
2. ^{a} ^{b} The New Rolling Stone Record Guide. Ed. Dave Marsh and John Swenson. New York: Random House, 1983. (Note 2, see p 645-648) (Note 2a, see p xv) (Note 2b, see p xvii-xix)
3. ^{a} The Rolling Stone Album Guide. Ed. Anthony DeCurtis and James Henke with Holly George-Warren. New York: Random House, 1992. (Note 3, see p vii) (Note 3a, see ix)
