= RhythmOne =

American digital advertising technology company

RhythmOne plc
- Type: Public
- Industry: Internet services
- Founded: July 2004: San Francisco, California, U.S.; Cambridge, England
- Defunct: April 2019
- Fate: Acquired by Taptica (now Nexxen)
- Headquarters: San Francisco, California, U.S.
- Number of employees: 525 (June 2017)
- Website: rhythmone.com

RhythmOne plc, a subsidiary of Nexxen, is an American digital advertising technology company that owns and operates the web properties AllMusic, AllMovie, and SideReel.

Founded as Blinkx in 2004, it went public on the AIM market of the London Stock Exchange in 2007, and began trading as RhythmOne in 2017. The company is headquartered in San Francisco and London, England. RhythmOne acquired All Media Network and its portfolio of web properties in April 2015. In April 2019, RhythmOne merged with Taptica International (renamed Nexxen in 2023), an advertising technology company headquartered in Tel Aviv, Israel.

== History ==
Blinkx was named after blinkx.com, an Internet Media platform which connects online video viewers with publishers and distributors, using advertising to monetize those interactions. Blinkx has an index of over 35 million hours of video and 800 media partnerships, as well as 111 patents related to the site's search engine technology, which is known as CORE.

In 2004, Suranga Chandratillake, former US chief technology officer of Autonomy Corporation, founded Blinkx as a toolbar for web search, specializing in video. In December 2004, Blinkx launched an audio and video search engine. In July 2005, Blinkx launched SmartFeed, an RSS web feed for video links. In October 2006, Microsoft Corp. agreed to use Blinkx technology to power the video search on some parts of its MSN service and Live.com. In June 2007, Blinkx launched a contextual video advertising platform named AdHoc.

In March 2008, Blinkx released the Blinkx Beat video screensaver and in April of the same year, the company launched its broadband TV application. In May 2008, Blinkx introduced the Advanced Media Platform (AMP), a proprietary video content management solution; in August 2008 the company launched Blinkx Remote, a directory of full-length TV shows online for the US and UK. In December 2008, Blinkx introduced the Un-roll Unit, a new ad unit for online video.

In April 2009, Blinkx acquired some of the assets of the bankrupt Zango company under its Pinball Corporation subsidiary. In April 2010, the company launched behavioral targeting through Blinkx AdHoc. In May 2010, Blinkx launched a mobile video search site; in July Blinkx announced the launch of a new mobile API (Application Programming Interface). In October 2010, Blinkx launched Blinkx Beat for Google TV and Cheep, a social shopping service. In November 2010, the company achieved profitability and positive operating cash flow, doubling revenue year on year. In February 2011, Blinkx introduced TV API (Application Programming Interface). In February 2011, Blinkx announced a partnership with woomi, the connected TV destination from Miniweb Interactive, the cloud-based video distribution platform.

In April 2011, Blinkx announced the acquisition of Burst Media, an online media and technology company headquartered in Burlington, Massachusetts. This acquisition brought 35 million hours of online video and TV to Burst Media's audience of over 130 million unique users. In May 2011, the company announced the Blinkx app would be available on Roku. In November 2011, Blinkx announced a partnership with Orb Networks to bring 35 million hours of TV, video, and audio to Orb TV and Orb BR Users. In November 2011, the company acquired Prime Visibility Media Group (PVMG).

In January 2012, Blinkx received a U.S. Patent for Moving Thumbnails technology. In September 2012, an open beta of the next-generation Blinkx site launched. In January 2013, the company's next-generation video search and discovery site went live. In Dec 2013, Blinkx acquired Rhythm NewMedia Inc., a Mobile Video Advertising Platform.

In April 2015, Blinkx acquired All Media Network for an undisclosed amount, including website properties Sidereel.com, Allmusic.com, and Allmovie.com; the company unified its brands under the name RhythmOne. In June 2016, Blinkx plc changed its name to RhythmOne plc and began trading as RhythmOne plc on the London Stock Exchange. In December 2016, RhythmOne acquired Perk.com, a mobile rewards company with headquarters in Austin, Texas. In June 2017, RhythmOne acquired assets and 200 employees from RadiumOne. In September 2017, RhythmOne acquired YuMe Inc. for $185 million. In April 2019, RhythmOne was acquired by Taptica International.

=== All Media Network ===
All Media Network
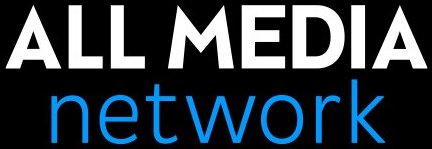
- Trade name: All Media Network, LLC
- Type: Private
- Industry: Entertainment
- Predecessor: All Media Guide, AllRovi
- Founded: June 26, 1990; 36 years ago Big Rapids, Michigan, U.S.
- Founder: Michael Erlewine
- Headquarters: San Francisco, California, U.S.
- Products: AllMusic, AllMovie, AllGame, SideReel, Celebified
- Number of employees: 11-50
- Website: allmedianetwork.com

All Media Network (AMN), formerly known as All Media Guide (AMG) and AllRovi, was an American company that owned and maintained AllMusic, AllMovie, AllGame (until its closure in 2014), SideReel and Celebified.

The company was founded in 1990 by popular-culture archivist Michael Erlewine. All Media Network offices were located in San Francisco, Ann Arbor, and other locations in the United States.

All Media Network was founded in Big Rapids, Michigan in 1990 by Michael Erlewine. With the All Music Guide the aim was to "[compile] discographic information on every artist who's made a record since Enrico Caruso gave the industry its first big boost", which launched in 1991.

All Music Guide (now AllMusic) was launched in 1991. In 1994, the All Movie Guide (now AllMovie) was launched and in 1998 the All Game Guide (later AllGame—defunct in 2014). They moved to Ann Arbor, Michigan in 1999 to take advantage of the "rich talent pool". AMG was a business unit within Alliance Entertainment from 1996 until early 2005. In 2006, AEC One Stop Group, Inc., was its parent company.

Alliance was acquired in 1999 by Yucaipa Companies, a multibillion-dollar fund based in California.

Macrovision (now TiVo) announced on November 6, 2007 that it had agreed to purchase All Media Guide for a reported $102 million; $72 million in cash was paid up front, and $30 million in contingent payments were made one year later. For a time, all of the guides were controlled by Rovi's nameservers and combined access to the All Music and All Movie Guides was provided via AllRovi.com from 2011 until 2013. In 2013, Rovi sold consumer access of the content to the newly established All Media Network, LLC, but retained control of licensing the content to other businesses. The overall website is allmedianetwork.com (previously allmediaguide.com and allrovi.com).

Rovi sold the consumer access to them to newly established All Media Network, LLC in 2013, while retaining ownership and maintenance of the content itself.

The AllGame section of the site was shut down on December 12, 2014.

On April 16, 2015 Blinkx Plc acquired All Media Network and rebranded the website under the new unified RhythmOne Group banner. In 2019 the company was acquired for $174M by Taptica, which in 2023 rebranded as Nexxen.

== Properties ==
=== AllMusic ===
AllMusic logo

AllMusic is an online database which provides access to information about songs, albums, musicians, bands, and musical styles alongside staff-authored news, reviews, biographies, ratings and recommendations. Initially published in book form in 1991 as the All Music Guide, the content is now freely available to the public for online reference and information as well as available via licensing for point-of-sale systems, media players, and online music stores.

==== Guide series ====
RhythmOne also produces the AllMusic guide series that includes the All Music Guide to Jazz and the All Music Guide to the Blues. Vladimir Bogdanov is the president of the series.

=== AllMovie ===
AllMovie logo

AllMovie, launched in 1994 as the All Movie Guide, provides access to information about actors, films, and filmmakers with staff-authored news, reviews, ratings, and recommendations. It offers limited information about Television productions, focused mainly on those released on DVD. Like AllMusic, the content is also available via licensing to point-of-sale systems, media players, and online stores.

=== AllGame ===
AllGame logo

AllGame, active between 1998 and 2014 as the All Game Guide, offered information and reviews about many console, handheld, arcade, and PC games released in the US. The site started in February 1998 with the goal of becoming the most comprehensive game database available. In a farewell message on their site, the staff noted that they "didn't all know exactly what we were doing in those early days but it was an exciting time to be helping build an online game database before the Internet exploded with numerous websites dedicated to video games."

=== SideReel ===
SideReel logo

SideReel, launched in 2007, is a TV community site which provides information about TV shows and episodes.

=== Celebified ===
Celebified offers celebrity news and interviews and started in 2012. As of December 2023, all prior existing URLs now return a 404 error. The homepage of Celebified.com now only exists as a feed of posts from other network websites.

== Operations ==
=== Business model ===
The AllMusic database is also used by several generations of Windows Media Player and Musicmatch Jukebox to identify and organize music collections. Windows Media Player 11 and the integrated MTV Urge music store have expanded the use of AllMusic data to include related artists, biographies, reviews, playlists and other data.

All Media Network licenses large databases of metadata about movies, video games, audio books, and music releases from Rovi Corporation and publishes them online for consumer use. This includes credits, and staff-written biographies, reviews, ratings, and recommendations as well as categories such as theme or mood. Rovi also makes this content available for point of sale systems in stores globally, for CD and DVD recognition in software media players such as Windows Media Player and Musicmatch Jukebox, and for providing content for a variety of websites including iTunes, Pandora, and Spotify.

Formerly, All Media Guide sold print compilations of its information. RhythmOne's database was initially set up by Vladimir Bogdanov.

Information in the database is licensed and used in point-of-sale systems by some music retailers, includes the following:

- Basic data: names, genres, credits, copyright information, product numbers.
- Descriptive content: styles, tones, moods, themes, nationalities.
- Relational content: similar artists and albums, influences.
- Editorial content: biographies, reviews, rankings.

All Media Network formerly operated LASSO, a media recognition service that automatically recognized CDs, DVDs, and digital audio files in formats such as MP3, WMA, and others. The service used CD table of contents (ToC), DVD ToC, and acoustic fingerprinting to recognize media. LASSO was available in versions for PCs and embedded devices. It was acquired by Rovi in 2011 and renamed Rovi Media Recognition Service.

== Adware controversy ==
A lengthy criticism of Blinkx by Harvard Business School Associate Professor Ben Edelman, published in January 2014, sought to prove that Blinkx continued the adware operations of two companies it acquired, Prime Visibility Media Group and Zango, and was defrauding advertisers. Blinkx responded point-by-point in March 2014, saying that it did not install adware without user consent and that they did not wholly acquire Zango or its assets. An earlier, 2009 blog post by Ken Smith, Zango co-founder and former CTO, supported Edelman's assertion that Blinkx acquired all of Zango's assets.

Forbes contributor Peter Cohan claimed that Edelman's post caused a massive drop in Blinkx's stock price, and further noted that Blinkx's initial, now-deleted corporate response on 30 January 2014 was largely an attack on Edelman's methods, rather than on the content of his analysis. However, New York Times blogger Mark Scott theorized that Edelman's undisclosed client(s), who funded his research on Blinkx, may have been hedge funds who profited from shorting the drop in Blinkx's stock price.

Edelman published further research in April 2014, claiming that Blinkx offered users deceptive software installers and used deceptive pop-up advertisements. He continued to defend his claim that Blinkx purchased all of Zango's assets, including its physical headquarters, and argued that a Federal Trade Commission order against Zango in 2007 may still apply to Blinkx. A section of the post co-authored with digital fraud investigation consultant Wesley Brandi also defended and furthered his initial claims that Blinkx was defrauding its advertising affiliates.

== Executives ==
- Mark Bonney – Chief Executive Officer
- Suranga Chandratillake – President and Chief Strategy Officer
- Richard O'Connor – Chief Financial Officer
- Frank Pao – Chief Business Officer
- Dan Slivjanovski – Chief Marketing Officer
- Richard Nunn – Chief Revenue Officer
- Bhaskar Ballapragada – Senior Vice President, Product

== See also ==
- Babelgum
- Hulu
- Internet television
- IPTV
- Joost
- List of online music databases
- Miro (software)
- Slingbox
- Stephen Thomas Erlewine, senior editor of AllMusic
- Veoh
