= Tommy Reynolds (musician) =

American jazz clarinetist & bandleader (1917–1986)

- Born: Thomas Anthony Rinaldo; January 17, 1917; Akron, Ohio, U.S.
- Died: September 30, 1986 (aged 69) New York City, New York, U.S.
- Genres: Jazz
- Instruments: Clarinet

Tommy Reynolds (born Thomas Anthony Rinaldo, January 17, 1917 – September 30, 1986) was an American jazz clarinetist and bandleader.

== Early life ==
Reynolds was born in Akron, Ohio. At the age of eight years old, Reynolds played violin and later learn to play the clarinet and saxophone in high school. He studied at the University of Akron, worked briefly with Ben Pollack, and then became a member of the orchestra of Isham Jones in 1937, where he remained for two years.

== Career ==
At the end of 1939, Reynolds founded his own band, Tommy Reynolds and his Band of Tomorrow, which became popular in the Midwest through radio transmissions of their performances in Cleveland. Reynolds also appeared at the Roseland Ballroom and the Paramount Hotel in New York, The Apollo in Harlem, Frank Dailey's Meadowbrook in New Jersey, the Bandbox in Chicago, and the Palladium in Hollywood. Reynolds recorded with his bands for the labels Columbia, Vocalion, Atlantic and Okeh; Mary Ann McCall was one of his vocalists. The band's theme song was "Pipe Dreams".

Reynolds was able to keep his big band in the 1950s, with musicians such as Serge Chaloff, Dewey Jackson, Urbie Green, and Fats Navarro. After dissolving the group, he became musical director of the radio and television station WOR/WOR-FM/WOR-TV in New York City. His most famous production there was Bandstand USA.
