= Tiny Kahn =

American jazz musician

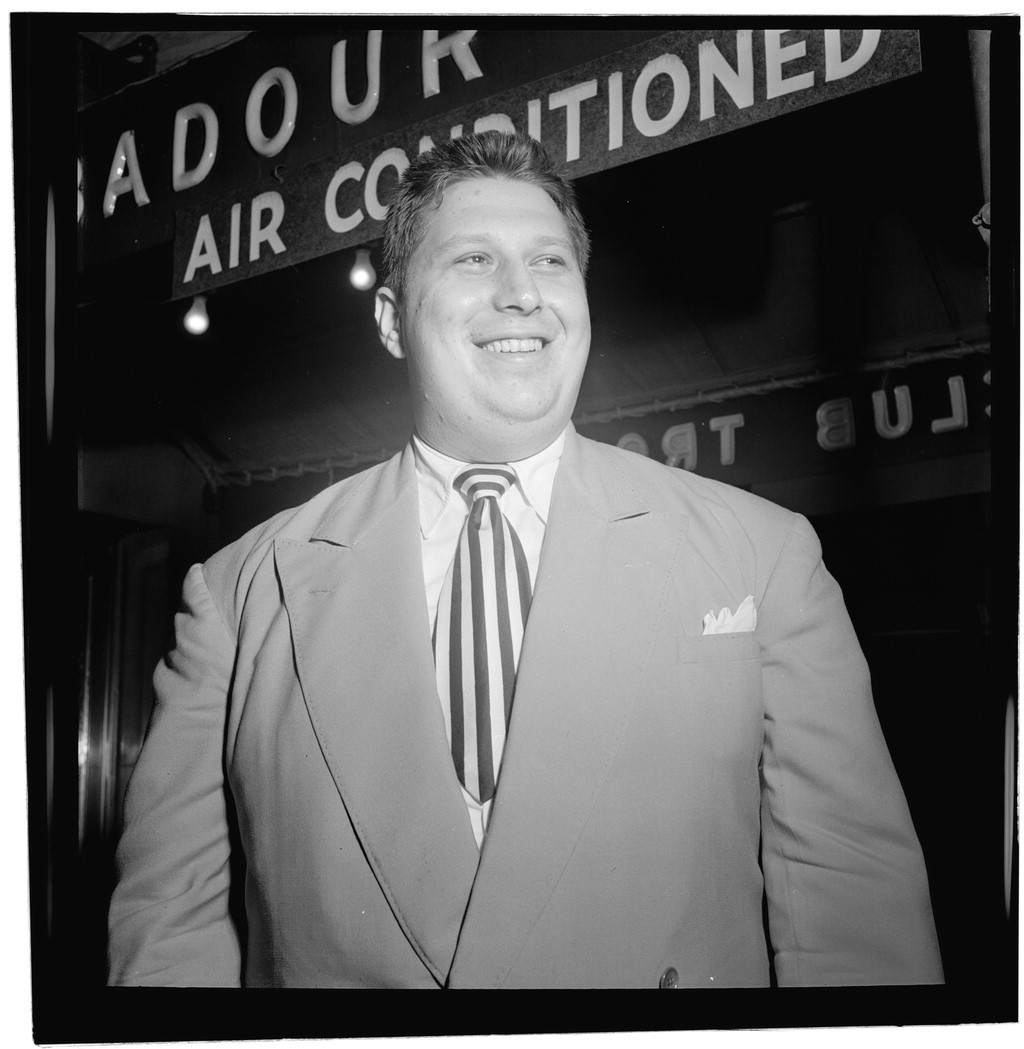
Tiny Kahn

Norman "Tiny" Kahn (1923 – August 19, 1953) was an American jazz drummer, arranger, and composer.

He was born in New York, United States. Kahn began playing drums at age 15. He played with Boyd Raeburn (1948), Georgie Auld, Chubby Jackson, and Charlie Barnet (1949), and played drums and vibraphone under Elliot Lawrence (1952–53). He also performed and recorded with Red Rodney, Serge Chaloff, Lester Young, Al Cohn, and Stan Getz.

He worked with many of the ensembles he played in as an arranger, and also arranged for Woody Herman and Elliot Lawrence. He composed "Tiny's Blues" and "Father Knickerbopper" among other tunes. He has been mentioned as the original composer of Donna Lee before it was taught to Miles then Bird. Kahn never led a recording session; he died in Edgartown, Massachusetts, of a heart attack at age 30.

== Discography credits ==
- Serge Chaloff, The Complete Small Group Bop Sessions (Jazz Factory, 1999)
- Al Cohn, Al Cohn's Tones (Savoy, 1956)
- Stan Getz, The Complete Roost Recordings (Blue Note, 1997)
- Al Haig, Meets the Master Saxes Vol. Three (Spotlite, 1980)
- Bill Harris, Bill Harris Herd (Norgran, 1956)
- J. J. Johnson and Kai Winding, Jay & Kai (Savoy, 1955)
- Boyd Raeburn, On the Air Vol. 2 (Hep, 1974)
- Lester Young, The Aladdin Sessions (Blue Note, 1975)
