= Serge Chaloff =

American jazz saxophonist (1923–1957)

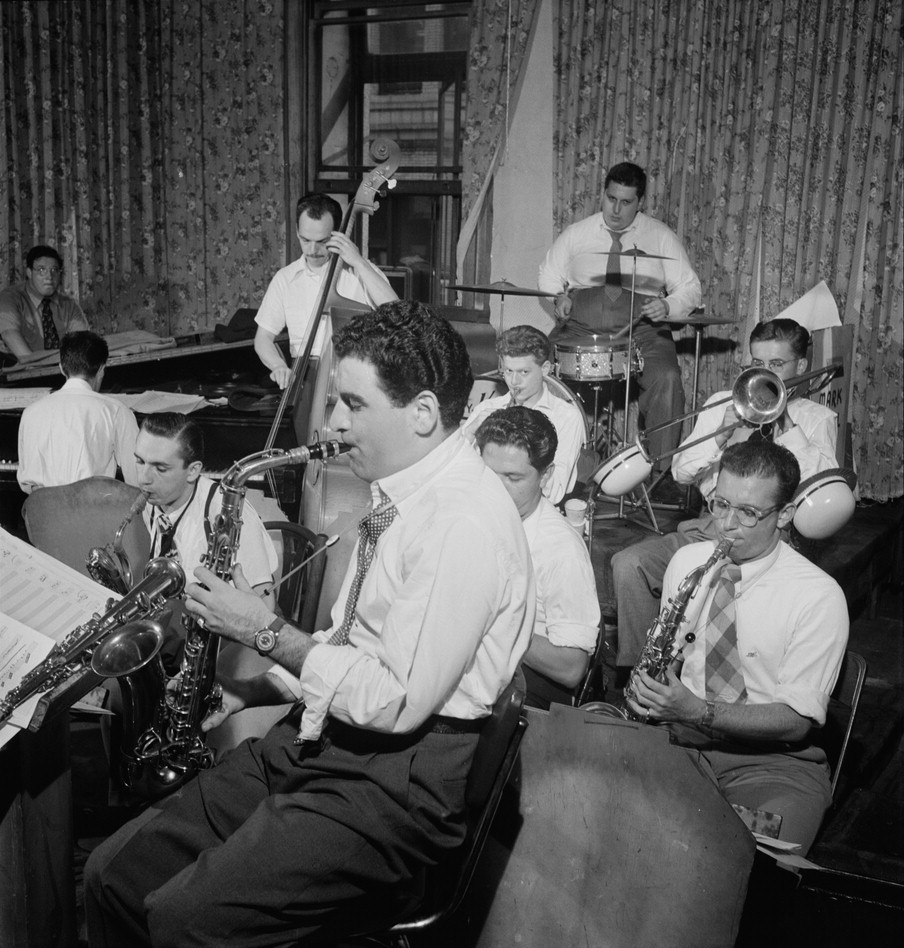
- Chaloff (lower left) with Georgie Auld, Red Rodney, and Tiny Kahn, c. August 1947. Photo by William P. Gottlieb.

Background information
- Born: November 24, 1923
- Origin: Boston, Massachusetts, US
- Died: July 16, 1957 (aged 33)
- Genres: Jazz
- Occupation: Musician
- Instrument: Baritone saxophone
- Years active: 1937–1957
- Formerly of: Woody Herman

Serge Chaloff (November 24, 1923 – July 16, 1957) was an American jazz baritone saxophonist. One of bebop's earliest baritone saxophonists, Chaloff has been described as 'the most expressive and openly emotive baritone saxophonist jazz has ever witnessed' with a tone varying 'between a light but almost inaudible whisper to a great sonorous shout with the widest but most incredibly moving of vibratos.'

== Musical education ==
Serge Chaloff was the son of the pianist and composer Julius Chaloff and the leading Boston piano teacher, Margaret Chaloff (known professionally as Madame Chaloff). He learned the piano from the age of six and also had clarinet lessons with Manuel Valerio of the Boston Symphony Orchestra. At the age of twelve, after hearing Harry Carney, Duke Ellington's baritonist, he taught himself to play the baritone. Chaloff later explained to Leonard Feather in an interview: 'Who could teach me? I couldn't chase [Harry] Carney around the country.'

Although he was inspired by Carney and Jack Washington, Count Basie's baritone player, Chaloff did not imitate them. According to his brother, Richard, 'he could play (baritone) like a tenor sax. The only time you knew it was a baritone was when he took it down low. He played it high....He had finger dexterity, I used to watch him, you couldn't believe the speed he played. He was precise. He was a perfectionist. He would be up in his bedroom as a teenager. He would be up by the hour to one, two, three in the morning and I'm trying to sleep and he'd go over a phrase or a piece until it was perfect...I used to put the pillow over my head, we had battles.'

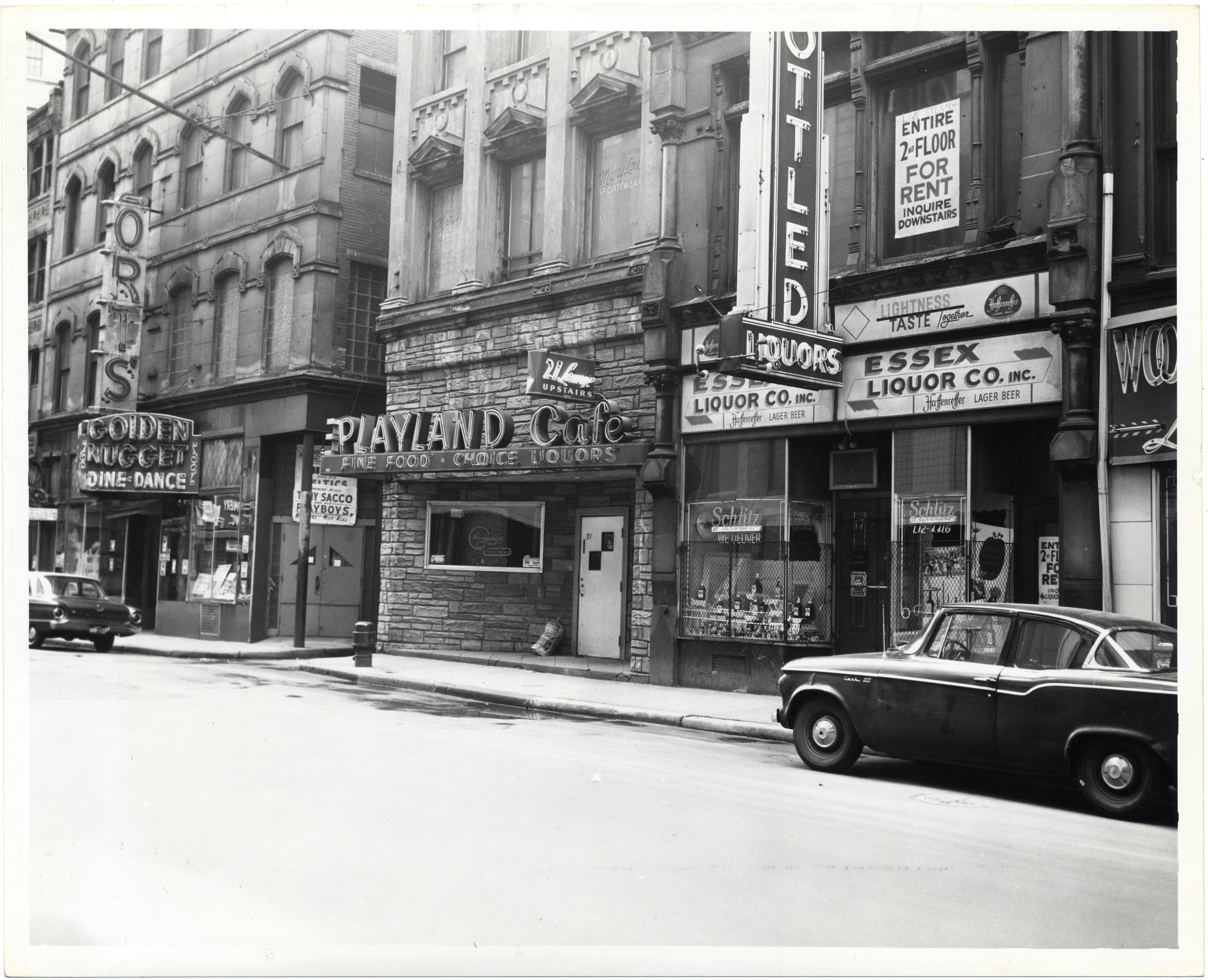
Essex Street, Boston, with Izzy Ort's on the left

From the age of fourteen, Chaloff, was sitting in at Izzy Ort's Bar & Grille a famous live music venue on Essex Street in Boston. Richard Chaloff remembered: 'He didn't have a permit to work but he was pretty tall and he went down to see Izzy Ort...and played for him and Izzy liked the sax...and he hired my brother to work nights....My mother used to pray on Sundays that that he'd make it outa there....My brother sat in with bandsmen that were in their thirties and forties...and here he was fourteen, fifteen years old and he played right along with them, and he did so well that they kept him.'

== Big bands ==
In 1939, aged just sixteen, Chaloff joined the Tommy Reynolds band, playing tenor sax. This was followed by jobs in the bands of Dick Rogers, Shep Fields and Ina Ray Hutton. In July 1944, he joined Boyd Raeburn's short-lived big band, where he played alongside Dizzy Gillespie and Al Cohn, who became a lifelong friend. With Boyd Raeburn, in January 1945, he made his first recordings, including 'Interlude' (Dizzy Gillespie's 'A Night in Tunisia'), where his baritone can be heard in the opening section of the song.

While with Boyd Raeburn, Chaloff first heard Charlie Parker, who became his major stylistic influence. Stuart Nicholson argues that, rather than imitating Parker, Chaloff was inspired by his example 'grasping more the emotional basis for Parker's playing and using it as a starting point for his own style.' Richard Chaloff said that his brother 'palled' with (Parker) in New York. Any time he had the chance he would pal with him. He would sit in with him at night....My brother used to say that he was up till 4,5,6, in the morning with the Bird.....All the beboppers found each other out'

Alongside his 1945-1946 work in big bands led by Georgie Auld and Jimmy Dorsey, Chaloff performed and recorded with several small bebop groups, 1946-1947. These included Sonny Berman's' Big Eight, Bill Harris's Big Eight, the Ralph Burns Quintet, Red Rodney's Be-Boppers, and his own Serge Chaloff Sextette, which released two 78 records on the Savoy label. Three of the four tunes recorded were written and arranged by Chaloff while the fourth, 'Gabardine and Serge', was by Tiny Kahn. 'All four tunes are daredevil cute and blisteringly fast,' wrote Marc Myers. 'They showcase tight unison lines and standout solos by four of the six musicians, who are in superb form....(On 'Pumpernickel') Chaloff shows off his inexhaustible and leonine approach to the baritone sax.'

Serge Chaloff became a household name in 1947, when he joined Woody Herman's Second Herd. This was known as the 'Four Brothers Band', after the reed section, comprising Chaloff, Stan Getz, Zoot Sims, Herbie Steward, and a little later Al Cohn. He was featured on many Herman recordings, including "Four Brothers", Keen and Peachy", and had solo features in Al Cohn's "The Goof and I". and "Man, Don't Be Ridiculous." On the latter, he demonstrated 'an astonishing technical facility that was quite without precedent on the instrument.'

In 1949, Leonard Feather included Chaloff in his book Inside Be-Bop: 'Great conception and execution, good taste, clean tone and Bird-like style have made him the No.1 bop exponent of the baritone.'

== Drug addiction ==
By 1947, Chaloff, following the example of his hero, Charlie Parker, was a heroin addict. According to Gene Lees, Chaloff was the Woody Herman band's 'chief druggist as well as its number one junkie. Serge would hang a blanket in front of the back seats of the bus and behind it would dispense the stuff to colleagues.' Whitney Balliett wrote that Chaloff had 'a satanic reputation as a drug addict whose proselytizing ways with drugs reportedly damaged more people than just himself.' Many musicians blamed him for the drug-related death of the 21-year-old trumpeter Sonny Berman on January 16, 1947.

The trumpeter Rolf Ericson, who joined Herman's band in 1950, described the impact of drugs on the band's performances: 'In the band Woody had started on the coast...late in 1947, which I heard many times, several of the guys were on narcotics and four were alcoholics. When the band started a night's work they sounded wonderful, but after the intermission, during which they used the needle or lushed, the good music was over. It was horrible to see them sitting on the stage like living dead, peering into little paper envelopes when they weren't playing.'

One night in Washington D.C., Woody Herman had a public row on the bandstand with Chaloff. Herman told Gene Lees: 'He was getting farther and farther out there, and the farther out he got the more he was sounding like a fagalah. He kept saying, ‘Hey, Woody, baby, I'm straight, man, I'm clean.' And I shouted, ‘Just play your goddamn part and shut up!'....I was so depressed after that gig. There was this after-hours joint in Washington called the Turf and Grid....I had to fight my way through to get a drink, man. All I wanted was to have a drink and forget it. And finally I get a couple of drinks, and it's hot in there, and I'm sweating, and somebody's got their hands on me, and I hear, ‘Hey, Woody, baby, whadya wanna talk to me like that for? I'm straight, baby, I'm straight.' And it's Mr. Chaloff. And then I remember an old Joe Venuti bit. We were jammed in there, packed in, and...I peed down Serge's leg. You know, man, when you do that to someone, it takes a while before it sinks in what's happened to him. And when Serge realized, he let out a howl like a banshee.'

Chaloff's bandmate, Terry Gibbs, told Ira Gitler stories of his chaotic behaviour: 'He'd fall asleep with a cigarette all the time and always burn a hole in a mattress. Always! In about twelve hotels. When we'd go to check out, the hotel owner – Serge always had his hair slicked down even though he hadn't taken a bath for three years...the manager would say, 'Mr Chaloff, you burned a hole in your mattress and...' 'How dare you. I'm the winner of the down beat and Metronome polls. How dare you?'...the manager would always say, 'I'm sorry Mr Chaloff,'...Except one time when the band got off on an air-pistol kick....Serge put a telephone book against the door and was zonked out of his bird...he got three shots at the telephone book and made the biggest hole in the door you ever saw. So when he went to the check out, the guy said, 'Mr Chaloff, it'll cost you.'...He 'how-dared' him a few times. Couldn't get away with it. He said 'Well listen, if I'm gonna pay for the door I want the door.' It was twenty four dollars. So he paid for the door. I happen to be standing close by. 'Hey Terry,' he said. 'Grab this,' and all of a sudden I found myself checking out....We're walking out of the hotel with a door.'

Al Cohn described Chaloff's driving: 'I don't know how we kept from being killed. Serge would always be drunk. He was quite a drinker. Everything he did, he did too much. So one time we're driving, after work. It's four o'clock in the morning, and he makes a left turn, and we're wondering why the road is so bumpy. Turned out he made a left turn into the railroad tracks, and we're going over the ties.'

Zoot Sims also talked about Chaloff with Gitler: 'When Serge was cleaned up, you know, straight, he could be a delight, really to be around, a lot of fun. He knew how to handle himself. He had that gift. He could get pretty raunchy when he was strung out, but he could also be charming.'

In late 1949, when many big bands were folding for economic reasons, Herman broke up the Second Herd. Fronting a new small band in Chicago in 1950, Herman told Down Beat: 'You can't imagine how good it feels to look at my present group and find them all awake. To play a set and not have someone conk out in the middle of a chorus.'

== Count Basie's Octet ==
For part of 1950, Chaloff played in the All Star Octet of Count Basie who, like Herman, had broken up his big band. The band comprised Basie, Chaloff, Wardell Gray, Buddy DeFranco, Clark Terry, Freddie Green, Jimmy Lewis and Gus Johnson. The group recorded a handful of sides for Victor and Columbia and was also captured on airchecks.

== Return to Boston ==
In 1950, Chaloff returned to Boston, where he played in small groups in clubs like the High Hat, Petty Lounge and Red Fox Cafe. A 1950 performance at the Celebrity Club in Providence Rhode Island, was broadcast by WRIV, and has been released on CD as Boston 1950. Playing in small groups gave Chaloff the space to develop a new style of playing. In 1951, he talked about 'getting away from the fireworks that don't mean anything' that had been a part of his style up to that point and 'adding more colour and flexibility to his work.' His friend Al Cohn observed 'It wasn't until he left the big bands that he really started to develop as a soloist.'

Chaloff was now a star, winning the Down Beat and Metronome polls every year from 1949-1953. Yet his drug use and heavy drinking made it difficult for him to keep steady work, and he gave up playing completely in 1952-3.

Chaloff's come-back began in late 1953, when the Boston DJ Bob 'The Robin' Martin offered to become his manager. Helped by Martin, Chaloff formed a new group which played at Boston's Jazzorama and Storyville nightclubs. His usual musical partners were Boots Mussulli or Charlie Mariano (alto), Herb Pomeroy (trumpet), and Dick Twardzik (piano). "He didn't work a lot," said Bob Martin, "because the word was out. You had to talk somebody to give him a chance to play. When you got him a gig in a club or a hotel, he would usually mess it up. But when he did show...and got playing...it was,'Stand back, Baby!'"

Jay Migliori, who played with Chaloff at Storyville, recalled, 'Serge was a wild character. We were working at Storyville and, if he was feeling good, he used to let his trousers gradually fall down during the cadenza of his feature, 'Body and Soul.' At the end of the cadenza, his trousers would hit the ground.'

== Serge and Boots and The Fable of Mabel ==
In June and September 1954, Chaloff made two recording sessions for George Wein's Boston Storyville label, released as two 10" LPs. The first Serge and Boots was presented as a joint album with Boots Mussulli, with accompaniment by Russ Freeman (piano), Jimmy Woode (bass) and Buzzy Drootin (drums). Yet George Wein wrote on the sleevenote: 'An alternate title for this album could be 'Serge Returns'....Each selection in these six was chosen and arranged solely by Serge.' There were five standards and a Chaloff original, 'Zdot', with an ending 'written by a wonderful pianist and teacher, Margaret Chaloff, Serge's mother.'.

On the second Storyville album, The Fable of Mabel, Chaloff played in a nine-piece band featuring Charlie Mariano, who composed three of the five originals, and Herb Pomeroy, who provided 'Salute to Tiny', dedicated to the drummer and arranger Tiny Kahn. The ambitious title piece was composed by Dick Twardzik, who described it on the sleevenote: 'The Fable of Mabel was introduced to jazz circles in 1951-52 by the Serge Chaloff Quartet. Audiences found this satirical jazz legend a welcome respite from standard night club fare. In this legend, Mabel is depicted as a woman who loves men, music and her silver saxophone that played counterpoint (her own invention which proved impractical). The work is divided into three movements: first, New Orleans; second Classical; and third, Not Too Sad An Ending. The soulful baritone solo by Serge Chaloff traces Mabel's humble beginnings working railroad cars in New Orleans to her emergence as a practising crusader for the cause of Jazz. During her Paris days on the Jazz Houseboat, her struggle for self-expression is symbolized by an unusual saxophone duet Charlie Mariano and Varty Haritrounian. Mabel always said she wanted to go out blowing. She did.' The sixth track, Al Killian's 'Lets Jump', was chosen by Chaloff, who said: 'Now that we've proven how advanced we are let's show the people that we can still swing.'

Just a month after his second Storyville recording, Chaloff went through a personal crisis. In October 1954, with no money and unable to find heroin, he voluntarily entered the drug rehabilitation program at Bridgewater State Hospital. After being hospitalized for three and a half months, he was released in February 1955, finally drug free.

== Boston Blow-Up! ==
In 1955, Bob Martin persuaded Capitol Records to record a Chaloff LP as part of their 'Stan Kenton Presents Jazz' series. Chaloff's come-back album, Boston Blow-Up! was recorded in New York City in April 1955. He was accompanied by Boots Mussulli (alto), Herb Pomeroy (tp), Ray Santisi (p), Everett Evans (b) and Jimmy Zitano (d). Pomeroy, Santisi and Zitano were already a tight unit, regularly playing at Boston's Stable Club, where they had recorded a live album Jazz in a Stable, on Transition the previous March.

The Kenton connection came about through Mussulli, who had played in his orchestra in 1944-7 and 1952-4. Richard Vacca wrote that 'Chaloff still had his bad boy reputation, and the presence of the steady and reliable Mussulli, who had recorded his own 'Kenton Presents' LP in 1954, was a great relief to Capitol.' For the recording, he composed and arranged five new tunes, including 'Bob the Robin', dedicated to Chaloff's manager. Pomeroy arranged the standards.

Chaloff described the sessions: 'When I came back on the music scene, just recently, I wanted a book of fresh sounding things. I got just what I wanted from Herb and Boots. I think their writing shows us a happy group trying to create new musical entertainment by swinging all the time. Jazz has got to swing; if it doesn't, it loses its feeling of expression. This group and these sides are about the happiest I've been involved with.'

The highlights of the album are Chaloff's powerful ballad features, "What's New?", and "Body and Soul". In the 1956 Metronome Yearbook, Bill Coss described the latter as 'an almost frightening example of Serge's form, moaning through a seemingly autobiographical portrayal of (his) Body and Soul', an enormously emotional jazz listening experience.'

Jack Tracy gave Boston Blow-Up! five stars in his Down Beat review: 'Serge, for years one of music's more chaotic personalities, has made an about face of late and is again flying right. It is evident in his playing, which has become a thing of real beauty....Chaloff offers the best display of his talents ever to be put on wax. It swings, it has heart, it has maturity—it is the long-awaited coalescence of a great talent.'

Boston Blow-Up!'s favourable reception brought more work for Chaloff, culminating in a performance at the Boston Arts Festival in June 1955. The show was reviewed in the Boston Herald: 'The ingenuity of Chaloff as a soloist is enormous, and his use of dissonance always conveys a sense of purpose and of form. In 'Body and Soul', he exhibited his capabilities vigorously, taking a deliberate tempo and treating the music with a lyric, delicate, tonal standpoint....the harmonies of the group are tense and the melodies resourceful and they play with a kind of controlled abandon.'

In 1956, Chaloff worked his way across the country, usually working in an alto/baritone format. In Chicago, he played alongside Lou Donaldson. In Los Angeles, he played with Sonny Stitt, in a band which also included Leroy Vinnegar, the leading West Coast bassist.

== Blue Serge ==
Chaloff's Los Angeles appearance led to his recording a second Capitol LP there in March 1956. The drummer was Philly Joe Jones, who was in Los Angeles with the Miles Davis Quintet. Sonny Clark played piano, and Leroy Vinnegar was on bass. Chaloff described the making of the record, called Blue Serge, on the jacket blurb: 'My last record, Boston Blow-up! was one of those carefully planned things....But this time I was feeling a little more easy-going, and I decided to make a record just to blow. I picked out what I felt was the best rhythm section around and told them just to show up...no rehearsals...no tunes set...and trust to luck and musicianship....I'd never worked with these guys before except for jamming briefy with Joe Jones eight years ago, but I knew from hearing them what they could do....We were shooting for an impromptu feeling and we got it. It has more freedom and spark than anything I've recorded before. And I don't think there's a better recommendation than that when it comes to honest jazz.'

Vladimir Somosko, Chaloff's biographer, described the results: 'The rapport of the group was as moving as the music, and the net effect was of every note being in place, flawlessly executed, as if even the slightest nuance was carefully chosen for maximum aesthetic impact. This is a level of achievement beyond all but the masters, and from an ensemble that was not even a working group it takes on an aura of the miraculous.'

Stuart Nicholson analysed Chaloff's playing on "A Handful of Stars": 'Paraphrase becomes central to his performance of 'A Handful of Stars' where he scrupulously avoids stating the melody as written. At one point he plumbs the baritone for a bumptious bass note and soars to the top of the instrument's range in one breath, effortlessly concealing the remarkable technical skill required for such seemingly throw-away trifles. This sheer joy at music making seems to give his playing a life-force of its own.'

Richard Cook and Brian Morton in The Penguin Guide to Jazz declared the album 'Chaloff's masterpiece' and described it as 'vigorous and moving... "Thanks for the Memory" is overpoweringly beautiful as Chaloff creates a series of melodic variations which match the improviser's ideal of fashioning an entirely new song. 'Stairway to the Stars' is almost as fine, and the thoughtful 'The Goof and I' and 'Susie's Blues' show that Chaloff still had plenty of ideas about what could be done with a bebopper's basic materials. This important session has retained all its power.'

== Spinal cancer ==
Chaloff continued to work on the West Coast, performing at the Starlite Club in Hollywood in May 1956. That month, while playing golf, he was struck down by severe back and abdominal pains, which paralysed his legs. Chaloff flew back to Boston, where an exploratory operation revealed that he was suffering from cancer of the spine. His brother Richard described his final illness: 'We took him down there [Massachusetts General Hospital] and they found he had lesions on his spine.....they operated and took most of the lesions away, and then he went on a series of X-ray treatments. Oh they were terrible. He must have had twenty or twenty-five in a row. And in those days they really gave you heavy doses of it. Then occasionally he got spots on the lungs'

Despite his illness, and the gruelling treatment, Chaloff continued to play live. In New York, on 18 June 1956, a wheelchair-using Chaloff took part in a recording of Charlie Parker's "Billie's Bounce", for the Metronome All Stars album. He played alongside Zoot Sims, Art Blakey, Charles Mingus and Billy Taylor.

Chaloff's final recording, on 11 February 1957, was for The Four Brothers... Together Again! a reunion album of Woody Herman's Four Brothers for Vik, a subsidiary of RCA Victor. The Four Brothers lineup was Zoot Sims, Al Cohn, Herbie Steward and Chaloff, accompanied by Elliot Lawrence (piano), Buddy Jones (bass) and Don Lamond (drums). On the later recordings, Charlie O'Kane was brought in to play baritone on the section parts, so Chaloff could preserve his strength for the solos. Here his playing was as strong as ever, especially on "Aged in Wood", written as a solo vehicle for Chaloff by Al Cohn.

Richard Chaloff: 'He took a wheelchair down to make that recording, you know. They didn't think he was going to make it. I heard stories from people there. But when he stood up and played, you never knew he was a sick fellow. He played dynamic. If you listen to the record he sounds like the old Serge. He pulled himself together. I don't know how he did it. But he had tremendous drive, tremendous stamina.'

Don Gold reviewed the album in Down Beat: 'This last session before his death represents a fervent expression of a fatally ill man. It is a kind of significant farewell in the language he knew best.'

Chaloff made his last live appearances at The Stable Club on Huntington Avenue in Boston the following May. Interviewed in 1993, Charlie 'the Whale' Johnson recalled Chaloff's final performances: 'I remember pushing Chaloff's wheelchair into The Stable for his last appearances there. He was in bad shape but could still really play, standing leaning on a pillar. However, he didn't have much stamina. He couldn't really finish the gig. I also had to go get pot and booze for him. He was still using these steadily, even in the hospital at the end.'

On 15 July 1957, the dying Chaloff was admitted to Massachusetts General Hospital. According to Richard Chaloff, he took his horn and pet monkey with him: 'He still had the kinkajou monkey Mother got him to keep him company. And he had his horn. I was told they wheeled him into a vacant operating theatre so he could practise, and that was his last gig, his last public performance, solo baritone sax alone in an operating theatre. Nurses, doctors and even patients were standing outside and listening. He fought it to the end. Mother would visit him and urge him on, saying, 'You can beat it' and things. But that last day, they brought a priest to visit him, and the priest saw Serge in bed looking so wasted, and the priest thought he was supposed to perform the last rites. Serge woke up in the middle of it and really panicked, sliding away from him and yelling 'No! No! Get out!' But after that he seemed to give up. I think that's when he realized it was all over.'

Serge Chaloff died the next day, at the age of 33.

He is buried in the Forest Hills Cemetery, Jamaica Plain, Boston, Suffolk County, Massachusetts.

== Discography ==
- Boston 1950, Uptown Records, 1994
- Serge and Boots, Storyville LP 310 1954
- The Fable of Mabel, Storyville LP 317 1955
- Boston Blow–Up!, Capitol Records 1955
- Blue Serge, Capitol Records 1956
- Metronome All-Stars 1956, Verve Records 1956
- The Four Brothers... Together Again!, Vik Records, 1957

=== Sideman ===
Sessions with Boyd Raeburn, Jimmy Dorsey, Georgie Auld, Sonny Berman, Woody Herman and Count Basie
