= Dick Twardzik =

American jazz pianist

Background information
- Born: Richard Henryk Twardzik; April 30, 1931; Danvers, Massachusetts, U.S.
- Died: October 21, 1955 (aged 24) Paris, France
- Genres: Jazz
- Occupation: Musician
- Instrument: Piano
- Years active: 1945–1955

Richard Henryk Twardzik (April 30, 1931 – October 21, 1955) was an American jazz pianist who worked in Boston for most of his career.

== Biography ==
Son of Henryk Franciszek Twardzik, Polish-American painter from Kraków, and Mary Claire Grant. Twardzik trained in classical piano as a child and made his professional debut at the age of fourteen. He was taught by Margaret Chaloff, the mother of baritone saxophone player Serge Chaloff. Twardzik recorded with Serge Chaloff and with Charlie Mariano. He worked with Charlie Parker on several occasions toward the end of Parker's life. Twardzik also played professionally with Chet Baker and Lionel Hampton. He recorded with Baker and Chaloff in 1954 and 1955.

In his teenage years, Twardzik became addicted to heroin. He died October 21, 1955, at age 24, from a heroin overdose while on tour with Chet Baker in Europe.

The song "In Memory of Dick", was written by saxophonist Bobby Jaspar, who occasionally played with Twardzik and Baker during their tour in Europe.

== Discography ==
=== As leader ===
- Trio with Russ Freeman (Pacific Jazz, 1956)

=== As sideman ===
- Chet Baker, Chet Baker in Europe (Pacific Jazz, 1955)
- Chet Baker, Indian Summer (The Complete 1955 Concerts In Holland) (Nederlands Jazz Archief NJA0701, 2007)
- Serge Chaloff, The Fabel of Mabel (1201 Music, 1999)
- Charlie Parker, The Happy Bird (Charlie Parker, 1961)
- Charlie Parker, Boston, 1952 (Uptown UPCD 27.42, 1996)
