= Vladimir Bogdanov (editor) =

American music critic, author, record producer

- Born: 1965 (age 60–61)
- Occupations: Music critic, author, editor
- Writing career
- Language: English
- Subject: Music
- Notable work: All Music Guide to Jazz

Vladimir Bogdanov (born 1965) is an American music critic, author, AllMusic editor and record producer. He is the editor of the fourth edition of the All Music Guide to Jazz (2002), and president of the AllMusic guide series. Bogdanov created the first database for what was then the All Media Group.
