= Phonolog =

Recorded music directory

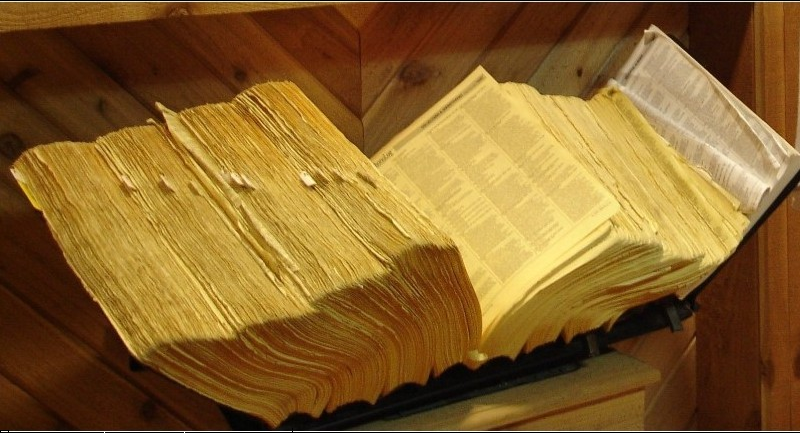
A Phonolog in Gatlinburg, Tennessee.

Phonolog or PhonoLog (full, older titles: PhonoLog: The All-in-One Record Catalog and PhonoLog: The All-in-One Record Reporter) was a recorded music directory that listed artists, currently available albums, and songs, focusing on popular music. Each directory contained thousands of loose-leaf pages and listings — 11,000 titles as of 1968. These large directories with their familiar yellow-gold pages were often located in record stores and libraries; they were used by store customers, library patrons, radio music directors, radio DJs, and anyone else who needed a comprehensive resource of recorded music. A nearly complete volume (since 1949) is on file with the Library of Congress for historical songwriter, album, and title research.

PhonoLog filled a valuable reference niche by cross-referencing. For example: a record store clerk was able to help a customer looking for a particular song by searching the "Title" section for the song name, where the album title and artist were listed. Similarly, a customer looking for an album who could not remember the singer could easily be assisted. If the album was stocked in the store, it could easily be retrieved and sold. If not, the label information provided the store enough information to order either through their corporate system, through their preferred one-stop supplier, or even directly from the label. The latter was especially valuable for smaller indie labels with fanatic, nationwide fan bases in the 1980s and beyond, such as Dischord, SubPop, Lookout, Twin/Tone, and others that would not otherwise have had the means to market to such a diverse number of stores.

Musicologists, copyright licensing agents, and other business entities used the album and artist sections for song credit information and contact information for track licensing for film projects. Lawyers and business managers researched whether other recording artists were using the same name to avoid confusion and "cease and desist" orders, and to track copyright usage. Artists used the song title and album sections to monitor their copyright usage as well. Labels used the free listing service to reach a broader market, and to network with regional one-stops outside their area.

New releases traditionally arrived to stores on Tuesdays. Assisting stores to generate sales, by 1996 PhonoLog updates were accompanied by a "StreetDates" one-sheet publication highlighting the next 2 weeks of anticipated and under-the-radar releases, with short reviews and space for the store to stamp their logo/info.

Early "PhonoLog" editions included singles. By the 1980s, the catalog listings were full-length releases only due to the increasing volume of product available, particularly with the proliferation of independent ("indie") record labels that coincided with 4 factors: 1) Do-It-Yourself (DIY) ethos of home-based recording, 2) increasing availability of Cassette and later CD reproduction technology, 3) an industry-wide shift from album development to a singles-driven market leading to increasing frequency and volume of releases, and 4) increasing availability of digital media and file sharing capabilities.

PhonoLog was first published in 1948 in Los Angeles, and was maintained through periodic updates called the Phonolog Reporter. (Note original lowercase "L.") Phonolog Publishing Co. of Los Angeles was its publisher in the 1970s. Trade Services Publications of San Diego produced and distributed updates to the catalog until 1997, when the company division merged with NYC-based Muze, Inc. to develop interactive CD-ROM based kiosk products for record stores. (The companies had competing products for a brief period of time, until databases were merged.) Muze now offers a similar music database called MuzeMusic.

PhonoLog Reporter has largely been overtaken by CDs and the Internet. There is also a CD distributed by Billboard magazine with hundreds of thousands of entries.

== See also ==
- Schwann Catalog
