= SideReel =

American website

- Company type: Online media
- Website type: Video Portal / Entertainment Fansite
- Headquarters: San Francisco, California, United States
- Parent: RhythmOne
- Website: www.sidereel.com
- Registration: Optional
- Launched: February 24, 2007; 19 years ago

SideReel is a television show tracking website. The site, while not a production or publishing entity, gives users access to various discussions, reviews, and news articles related to shows; it acts as a medium for users to access content centered around shows of their liking.

== History ==
SideReel launched in April 2007 and was featured in CNET's Webware "beta watch" that same month.

In 2011, SideReel was acquired by Rovi Corporation, and the Allrovi.com site was launched. The company also announced it had surpassed 1 million unique visitors in one day.

In July 2013, Rovi spun off SideReel, along with AllGame, AllMovie, AllMusic, and Celebified, as All Media Network; the company's owners includes the original founders of SideReel and Ackrell Capital investor Mike Ackrell.

In 2014, a free SideReel app was launched, allowing fans to find, track and watch their favorite TV series on iOS devices. The site's Android and iOS apps were later withdrawn as they were too unprofitable.

In 2020, the site was purchased by Netaktion LLC.

== Business model ==
SideReel compiles a comprehensive list of television shows and aggregates content for them. The site provides links to view full episodes online, as well as a forum to discuss and review TV shows.

This site allows users to actively collaborate on updating site content, and uses Facebook Connect to foster user participation and a sense of community. Users of Connect can see what shows friends like, and share their favorites.

== Criticism ==
In 2010, an LA Times article was published using interviews with unnamed anti-piracy experts who accused SideReel of being a way for viewers to watch shows that are not available online by linking to pirated streaming sites. The company denied the charges, stating that it was merely a specialized search engine that points to legitimate sites and removes infringing links when notified of them.
