= All Music Guide to Jazz =

Nonfiction book by Ron Wynn

All Music Guide to Jazz: The Definitive Guide to Jazz
- The cover of the fourth edition of All Music Guide to Jazz: The Definitive Guide to Jazz
- Author: Vladimir Bogdanov; Chris Woodstra; Stephen Thomas Erlewine
- Language: English
- Series: All Music Guide to...
- Subject: Jazz
- Genre: Non-fiction; Encyclopedic; Reference
- Publisher: Backbeat Books
- Publication date: November 27, 2002 (4th)
- Media type: Paperback
- Pages: 1,400
- ISBN: 0-87930-717-X
- OCLC: 50477109
- Dewey Decimal: 781.65/0266 21
- LC Class: ML156.4.J3 A45 2002

All Music Guide to Jazz: The Definitive Guide to Jazz is a non-fiction book that is an encyclopedic referencing of jazz music compiled under the direction of All Media Guide. The first edition, All Music Guide to Jazz: the Best CDs, Albums & Tapes, appeared in 1994 and was edited by Ron Wynn with Michael Erlewine and Vladimir Bogdanov (head of the All Music Guide book series). The book's fourth edition was released on November 27, 2002, and was edited by Vladimir Bogdanov, Chris Woodstra and Stephen Thomas Erlewine.

== Content ==
The book's back cover touts that the book contains ratings for close to 20,000 albums and 1,700 musician biographies. Artists are listed alphabetically and include some of the following: birth and death dates, classification (vocals, guitar, drums, etc.), a biography, a discography. The discography listings include a five star rating, the music label it was released on, and the date as well as possibly reviews of certain albums. These reviews are done by "respected critics" from Jazz Times and Coda.

There are also thirty essays on different styles along with "top lists" and extensive charts on the evolution/lineage of the jazz.

== Reception ==
Writing for the now defunct website Jazz Review, Mark E. Gallo described it as "the quintessential jazz encyclopedia." All About Jazz called it "a must-have reference for anyone interested in the world of recorded jazz past and present." Previous to this version, when albums weren't reviewed on five star scale, there was some confusion, but "in the long run what the editors have to say is more important than any rating scale." Also, previous versions have also relied heavily on few reviews to comment on many albums, which "tends to weaken" the book.

The added features are welcomed, since they give readers a "close-up view of the artists" within the jazz culture. The essays in particular are "exceptionally well researched and written".

== See also ==
- All Music Guide to the Blues
- The Penguin Guide to Jazz
- AllMusic
