= Robert "Big Mojo" Elem =

American blues guitarist and singer

- Born: Robert Elem; January 22, 1928; Itta Bena, Mississippi, United States
- Died: February 5, 1997 (aged 69) Chicago, Illinois, United States
- Genres: Chicago blues, electric blues
- Occupation(s): Guitarist, singer
- Instrument(s): Bass guitar, rhythm guitar, vocals
- Years active: 1948–1997

Robert "Big Mojo" Elem (January 22, 1928 – February 5, 1997) was an American Chicago blues bass guitarist and singer. Although he recorded only one studio album in his long career, Elem was a part of the Chicago blues scene for over 40 years. He variously backed Arthur "Big Boy" Spires, Lester Davenport, Freddie King, Magic Sam, Junior Wells, Shakey Jake Harris, Jimmy Dawkins, Luther Allison, and Otis Rush.

He was noted as a "born entertainer whose joking and acting on stage appealed to club audiences". Elem's energetic on-stage persona underpinned his lengthy performing career.

== Biography ==
Elem was born in Itta Bena, Mississippi, United States. He studied both Robert Nighthawk and Ike Turner playing live, which inspired his own early rhythm guitar playing. By 1948, Elem had relocated to Chicago, Illinois, where he spent the rest of his life. Shortly after arriving, Elem picked up employment backing Arthur "Big Boy" Spires and then Lester Davenport. To avoid being in a large batch of jobbing rhythm guitarists all seeking work, Elem moved over to playing the electric bass guitar. In 1956, this instrument was something of a rarity in Chicago, and Elem formed a band with the harmonica player Earl Payton, and a young Freddie King on lead guitar. The same year, King recorded his debut single for El-Bee Records. The A-side was "Country Boy", a duet with Margaret Whitfield. The B-side, "That's What You Think", was a King vocal. Both tracks featured the guitar of Robert Lockwood Jr., and the bass playing of Elem. That relative success saw King installed as the bandleader, but Elem stayed mostly with King for the next eight years. During the 1950s and 1960s, Elem regularly appeared in Chicago's burgeoning club environment, mainly on the West Side. He variously backed Magic Sam, Junior Wells, Shakey Jake Harris, Jimmy Dawkins, and Luther Allison, in addition to having a brief spell in Otis Rush's backing band.

Elem had a relatively high-pitched voice, and his bass playing eschewed standard walking bass patterns, rather utilising a single-note based groove. However, as a dedicated family man, Elem was reluctant to swap his day job for the vagaries of full-time musician status.

In 1978, Elem recorded his debut album, Mojo Boogie, which was released on Storyville Records. The collection had a mixture of blues standards, with some original numbers co-written by Elem and his record producer George Paulus. Elem was backed on the recording by the guitarists Willie James Lyons and Wayne Bennett, with Fred Below on the drums. The album was subsequently reissued in 1994 on Paulus's own St. George Records. Throughout this period Elem continued to perform locally, becoming well known for his own rendition of J. B. Lenoir's track, "The Mojo".

Elem died in February 1997 in Chicago, aged 69. In 2019 the Killer Blues Headstone Project placed a headstone for him at Oakridge Cemetery in Hillside, Illinois.

== Discography ==
=== Albums ===
Year	Title	Record label
1978	Mojo Boogie	Storyville Records
1994	Mojo Boogie!	St. George Records (reissue)
1997	Pink	MJ12 Records

With Luther Allison

- Love Me Mama (Delmark, 1969)

With Magic Sam

- Live at the Avant Garde (Delmark, 1968 [2013])

== See also ==
- List of Chicago blues musicians
