= Boston Blackie (guitarist) =

American Chicago blues musician (1943–1993)

Benjamin Joe "Bennie" Houston (November 6, 1943 – July 11, 1993), known by his stage name of Boston Blackie, was an American Chicago blues guitarist, singer, and bandleader.

Houston was born in Panola, Sumter County, Alabama in the Black Belt. The ninth of eleven children, he grew up in the farmhouse built by his father, a farmer, barber, carpenter, and bricklayer. He began playing guitar by age six. In 1962 he moved to Chicago where three of his brothers had already relocated and formed a band (Sweetman and the Sugar Boys), which he joined.

The band broke up following the death of his brother Nathanial, and Houston – briefly taking the stage name Dog Man – worked various gigs as he honed his craft in the 1960s and 1970s. He backed Johnny B. Moore and Lee "Shot" Williams at the Majestic Lounge, Little Milton at Pepper's Lounge, and played at various times with Magic Sam, Otis Rush, Freddie King, Kansas City Red, Hubert Sumlin, Homesick James, Jimmy Dawkins, Little Walter, and Eddie Shaw. His stage name is based on fictional pulp noir hero Boston Blackie; Houston was also exceptionally dark-skinned, given to playfully challenging the audience to send up a blacker person, a game he never lost.

Houston developed an aggressive, raw, and hard-edged style, informed by the work of Magic Sam, Otis Rush, Elmore James, Little Milton, and Bobby Blue Bland. He performed at all the West Side delta blues clubs. At the time of his death his Boston Blackie Blues Band was regularly appearing at Mr. Tee's Lounge, the Delta Fish Market, and the Guess Who Lounge.

Houston was shot dead in Chicago by blues singer Tail Dragger Jones. Jones claimed self-defense and that Houston, who claimed that Jones owed him money, had confronted him with a knife. Jones was convicted on a lesser charge of involuntary manslaughter and served seventeen months in prison.

== Discography ==
- Boston Blackie & Otis 'Big Smokey' Smothers – Chicago Blues Session, Volume 1 (1998, Wolf #120.847). Boston Blackie and Smothers did not play together on the record; rather it is a compilation, consisting of half Boston Blackie tracks and half Smothers tracks.
