= Jimmie Lee Robinson =

American singer-songwriter

- Also known as: Lonesome Lee
- Born: April 30, 1931; Chicago, Illinois, United States
- Died: July 6, 2002 (aged 71) Chicago, Illinois, United States
- Genres: Blues
- Occupations: Musician
- Instruments: Bass guitar, rhythm guitar, acoustic guitar, vocals
- Years active: 1942–2002
- Labels: Bandera; Delmark

Jimmie Lee Robinson (April 30, 1931 – July 6, 2002), also known as Lonesome Lee, was an American blues musician who was predominantly known for his involvement in the Chicago blues scene in the 1950s and 1960s. He performed with other blues musicians of the period and worked as a session musician. Following a hiatus from music, Robinson returned to the profession in the 1990s to record his own material on several albums.

== Biography ==
Robinson was born on April 30, 1931, in Chicago, Illinois, United States. As a child he lived with his grandparents. He was taught to play the guitar by his neighbor, the blues musician Blind Percy (who would later accompany him in concerts in the area). In 1942, Robinson began playing in the Maxwell Street market, where he also performed with local musicians. In 1948, Robinson met Eddie Taylor, and the two worked the Chicago club scene together until 1952. After the two split, Robinson formed a band, the Every Hour Blues Boys, with Freddie King, whom he met outside a welfare center. King later credited Robinson as one of his earliest and most influential teachers. The band lasted four years, and King later credited Robinson as one of his earliest and most influential teachers. In 1955, Robinson joined a band led by Little Walter, which was widely popular at the time. In 1958, Walter was incapacitated by a shooting, and Robinson became the vocalist of the group in Walter's absence, but he left the band later that year, because of personnel issues. Throughout the 1950s, Robinson was in demand as a session musician, playing guitar for such artists as Howlin' Wolf, Eddie Taylor, Elmore James, and Magic Sam. His lead guitar work from this period is notably featured on Little Walters's 1957 album Ah'w Baby. In addition to his session work, he recorded three singles for the Bandera label, including one of his signature songs, "All of My Life", in 1960. The song was later covered by British blues musician John Mayall, attesting to Robinson's influence beyond the Chicago scene.

In 1965, Robinson toured in Europe with Buddy Guy, Big Mama Thornton, and John Lee Hooker as a part of Horst Lippmann and Fritz Rau's American Folk Blues Festival. Robinson continued to tour and record in the United States, but, with the combination of the death of his mother and the fading popularity of the blues, his musical activity declined in the late 1960s. During this time, Robinson began using the name J. L. Latif Aliomar as a part of his religious conversion to Islam, opened a candy store in Chicago, and toured a few more times, often with his longtime friend Little Willie Anderson, and recorded, but at an inconsistent rate. In the 1980s, however, Robinson abandoned his music career and worked as a carpenter and later a cab driver for most of the decade.

In the late 1980s, members of a local blues band called Ice Cream Men encouraged Robinson to make a comeback. He returned to music and recorded his first studio album with the band in 1994 for Delmark Records, entitled Lonely Traveller, which included old and new tracks by Robinson. Four more albums followed: Guns, Gangs, and Drugs in 1996; Maxwell Street Blues in 1998; Remember Me, a solo acoustic recording on the APO label in 1998; and All My Life in 2001.

Robinson's comeback was capped by his active protest to prevent the gentrification of Maxwell Street. He was a member of the Maxwell Street Historic Preservation Coalition and wrote the group's theme song, "Maxwell Street Teardown Blues". Most of the buildings along the street were to have been demolished so the University of Illinois could expand. In protest, Robinson performed in 2000 on Maxwell Street, playing "Maxwell Street Teardown Blues", and fasted for 81 days. Despite the protest of Robinson and others, the street was almost completely demolished by the end of the year.

Early in 2002, Robinson was diagnosed with a malignant tumor in his sinuses, which was removed in April of the same year. He began performing again four days later in celebration of his 71st birthday at the Deep Blue Club. However, the cancer had already spread to the rest of his body, and his health deteriorated to the point of no recovery. On July 6, 2002, he was found dead in his car in Chicago with a self-inflicted gunshot wound to the head. Robinson most likely committed suicide to avoid the suffering stemming from his failing health. In 2019 the Killer Blues Headstone project placed the headstone for Robinson at Burr Oak Cemetery in Alsip, Illinois.

== Discography ==
With Shakey Jake

- Mouth Harp Blues (Bluesville, 1961)

With Al Smith

- Midnight Special (Bluesville, 1961)

Solo

- Lonely Traveller (1994)
- Guns, Gangs, and Drugs (1996)
- Remember Me (APO, 1998)
- All My Life (APO, 2001)
- Chicago Jump (2004)
