= Armand "Jump" Jackson =

American blues and R&B drummer, bandleader and songwriter (1917–1985)

- Born: March 25, 1917; New Orleans, Louisiana, U.S.
- Died: January 31, 1985 (aged 67) Chicago, Illinois, U.S.
- Genres: Blues, rhythm and blues
- Occupation(s): Drummer, bandleader, songwriter, record label owner, booking agent
- Instrument: Drums
- Years active: Early 1940s–mid 1960s
- Labels: Various including Columbia, Specialty, Aristocrat

Armand "Jump" Jackson (March 25, 1917 – January 31, 1985) was an American blues and rhythm and blues drummer, bandleader, songwriter, record label owner, and booking agent. He is best known for creating the forceful "sock" rhythm found on the backbeat on many blues recordings made in Chicago, Illinois, United States, during late 1940s and 1950s. He wrote a number of popular tracks including his own instrumental, "Midnight Shuffle".

In 1958, Jackson created La Salle Records. Four years later, he was the drummer for the first European tour of the American Folk Blues Festival.

== Life and career ==
Armand Jackson was born in New Orleans, Louisiana, United States.

At some point he relocated to Chicago, Illinois, and by 1941, he was playing the drums and leading his band, having acquired a residency at the 308 Club. The following year, his ensemble was performing at the Sky Club, and Jackson moved on to led the house band at Martin's Corner from late 1943 through to 1945. Jackson also played at the Circle Inn in July 1944. Concurrently he had started to play on recordings, for example Sonny Boy Williamson I's compilation album on Document Records, Complete Recorded Works, Vol. 4 (1941-1945) contained drum work from Jackson. In January 1946, Jackson put together a more permanent jump blues (hence the nickname) band with Johnny Morton (trumpet), Sax Mallard (alto sax) and later addition Bill Owens (piano). They started to be regular session musicians that Lester Melrose and his brothers put together, for recording sessions at both RCA Victor and Columbia. The Melrose sound had dominated Chicago blues before World War II, and on the back of that Jackson recorded four sides in his own right on September 13, 1946, for Columbia, with St. Louis Jimmy Oden providing the vocals on three of them. Jackson's band also began a six month long tenure at the Blue Heaven Lounge. On September 26 and October 4, 1946, Jackson recorded ten tracks for Specialty. The same year, he recorded with Tampa Red in a line-up comprising Blind John Davis, Ernest "Big" Crawford, Sax Mallard, and as leader of the ensemble, Jackson playing the drums. In June 1947, Jackson's band recorded for Aristocrat.

Jackson continued to develop his unique "fat, greasy sock rhythm", that appeared on many of the blues records produced in Chicago in the late 1940s and early 1950s. By the late 1940s, Jackson had appeared as bandleader and drummer on many sessions for Columbia, Specialty, and Aristocrat. During this timespan he backed singers such as St. Louis Jimmy Oden, Roosevelt Sykes, Sunnyland Slim, and Leonard Caston. He also drummed on many urban blues albums, from John Lee Hooker to Robert Nighthawk.

Jackson branched out in 1949, when he started to arrange bookings for other musicians, and expanded this area in time to maintain a thriving side-line business as a booking agent. During the 1950s, Jackson maintained a touring schedule as bandleader, and undertook additional work in several Chicago clubs, although his recording work almost dried up. In 1958, wishing to maintain a recording presence and control another part of the music business, Jackson created his own record label, La Salle Records. The label's name came from Jackson's business address and "garage" recording studio in South LaSalle Street, a major north–south street in Chicago named for Robert de La Salle, who was an early explorer of Illinois. In mid-1960, Lee Jackson, Eddy Clearwater, Little Brother Montgomery, Roosevelt Sykes, St. Louis Jimmy Oden, Sunnyland Slim, Tom Archia, Corky Roberts(on), and Shakey Jake Harris were all guests at Jackson's "Blues Party", an opening event organized in Jackson's garage studio, on 5727 South La Salle Street. Eddy Clearwater was given his nickname by Jackson as a correlation to Muddy Waters. To add to this portfolio, Jackson started songwriting in earnest. Jackson's song "Hey Big Momma", was recorded by Roosevelt Sykes on his 1960 album, The Return of Roosevelt Sykes, on which Jackson also played the drums. In addition, Jackson played the percussion on every track on the Sykes compilation album, Chicago Boogie, issued on CD in 2004 by Delmark Records.

Jackson's self-penned instrumental, "Midnight Shuffle", was recorded by the Jump Jackson Band, and released as a single on La Salle Records in 1961. Jackson's song, "Angry Lover", was recorded by Shakey Jake Harris on his 1961 album, Mouth Harp Blues. The Jackson penned, "Cry Cry Baby", was recorded by Little Brother Montgomery on his 1961 album, Tasty Blues. Jackson's songs "Suicide Blues", "Good Woman Blues", and "Fool Blues", were recorded by Curtis Jones for his 1961 album, Trouble Blues. Jackson co-wrote with Sonny Thompson seven of the tracks which appeared on Otis "Big Smokey" Smothers 1962 album, Sings the Backporch Blues. Others who recorded for the La Salle label included Eddie Boyd, Eddy Clearwater, Little Mack Simmons, and Sunnyland Slim.

In 1962, Jackson was selected to provide the percussion on the first American Folk Blues Festival tour of Europe, although his style of blues drumming was being usurped by a type of harder-edged backbeat, as exemplified by Fred Below.

Although his prolific days were over, Jackson continued to perform until his death, in Chicago, on January 31, 1985.

== Legacy ==
Blues from Up the Country is a 2003 compilation album, which captured many tracks with drumming by Jackson.
