= Odie Payne =

American Chicago blues drummer

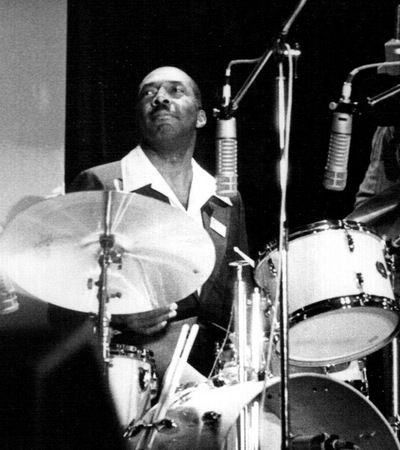
- Payne in 1978

Background information
- Born: Odie Payne Jr. August 27, 1926; Chicago, Illinois, U.S.
- Died: March 1, 1989 (aged 62) Chicago, Illinois, U.S.
- Genres: Chicago blues
- Occupation: Musician
- Instrument: Drums
- Years active: 1940s–1989

Odie Payne (August 27, 1926 – March 1, 1989) was an American Chicago blues drummer. Over his long career he worked with a range of musicians, including Sonny Boy Williamson II, Muddy Waters, Jimmy Rogers, Eddie Taylor, Little Johnny Jones, Tampa Red, Otis Rush, Yank Rachell, Sleepy John Estes, Little Brother Montgomery, Memphis Minnie, Magic Sam, Chuck Berry, and Buddy Guy.

== Biography ==
Born Odie Payne Jr. in Chicago, Illinois, he was interested in music from an early age and did not limit himself to a narrow musical genre. He studied music in high school. He was drafted into the U.S. Army, and after his discharge he graduated from the Roy C. Knapp School of Percussion. By 1949, Payne was playing with the pianist Little Johnny Jones, before meeting Tampa Red and joining his band. The association lasted for around three years. In 1952, Payne and Jones joined Elmore James's band, the Broomdusters.

Payne played with the Broomdusters for another three years, but his recording association with them lasted until 1959. In total he recorded thirty-one singles with them, including "The Sky Is Crying". By this time Payne had become a favored session musician, playing through that decade with Otis Rush, Magic Sam, and Buddy Guy for Cobra Records. He also played on various records released by Chess Records, including Chuck Berry's hit singles "Nadine", "You Never Can Tell", "Promised Land" and "No Particular Place to Go" (1964) All appeared on the Berry's 1982 compilation album, The Great Twenty-Eight.

Noted for his use of the cowbell, bass drum pedal, and extended cymbal and drum rolls, Payne's double-shuffle drumming technique was much copied and was used by Fred Below and Sam Lay. The technique called for Payne to use both hands to produce the shuffle effect.

Payne appears to have had a songwriting credit for the song "Say Man," which was recorded by both Bo Diddley and Willie Mabon, although Payne's name did not appear on every version published.

Payne died in Chicago on March 1, 1989, at the age of 62.

== Discography ==
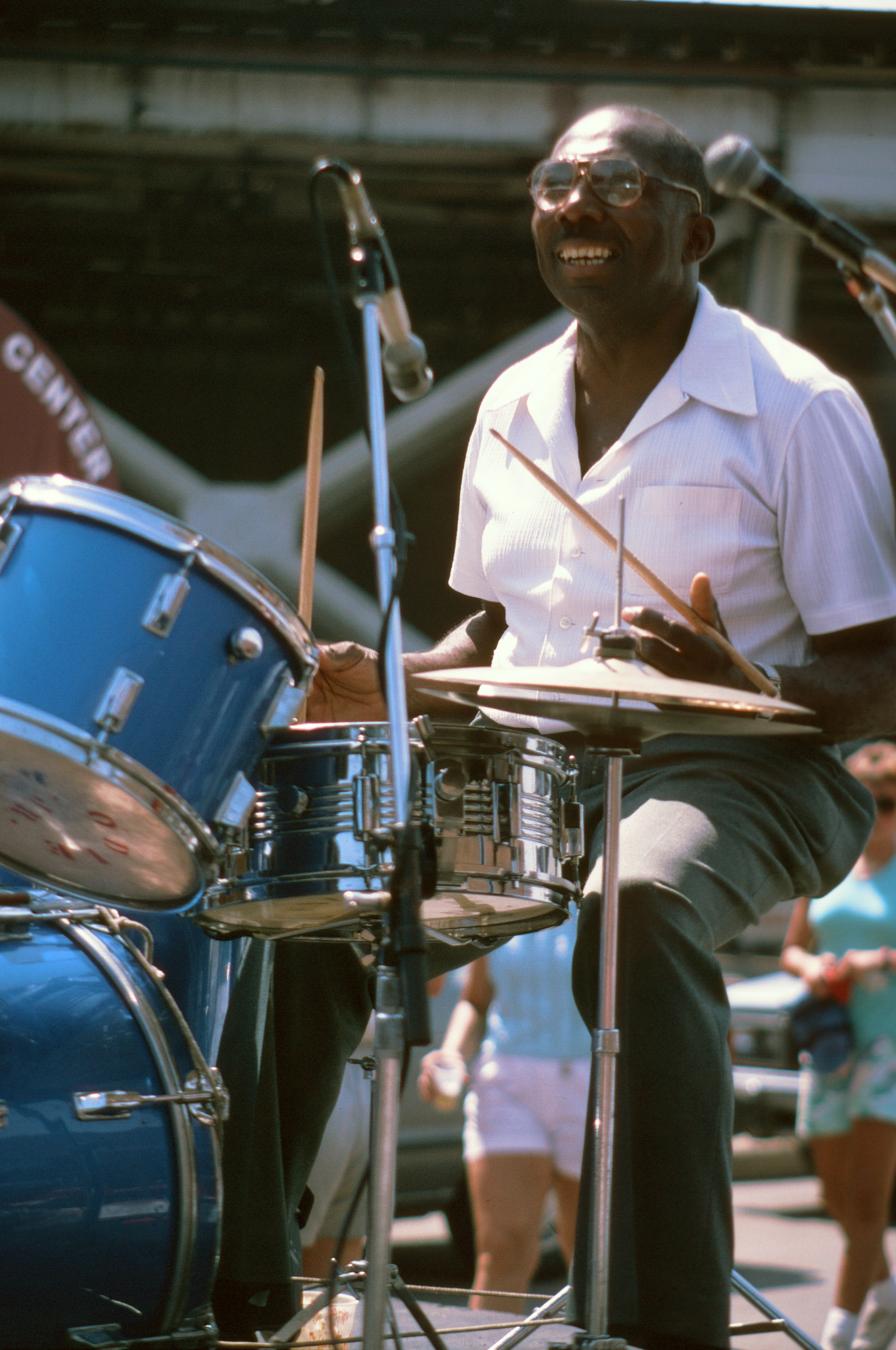
Payne in 1986

Albums:

- Eddie Taylor with Louis Myers, Dave Myers and Odie Payne – Live In Japan 1977 - Deluxe Edition (deluxe edition released 2009)
- Live at the Piano Man : Erwin, Angela, Clark & Odie (1984)
- No! "What Did She Say"? (1987)

With Magic Sam

- West Side Soul (Delmark, 1967)
- Black Magic (Delmark, 1968)
- Magic Touch (Black Magic, 1966 [1983]) with Shakey Jake
- The Magic Sam Legacy (Delmark, 1967/68 [1989])
- Rockin' Wild in Chicago (Delmark, 1963/64/66/68 [2002])

With Elmore James

- Slide Guitar Master (Proper Records, 1951-1955 [2006])

Odie Payne has over 263 credits with various artists over his career.

== See also ==
- List of Chicago blues musicians
