= The Magic Sam Legacy =

Compilation album by Magic Sam
- Released: 1989
- Recorded: February 6, 1966, October 18 & 25, 1967, October 23, 1968 and November 6, 1968
- Studio: MBS Recording Studios and Sound Studios, Chicago
- Genre: Blues
- Length: 44:15
- Label: Delmark; DS-651
- Producer: Robert G. Koester

Magic Sam chronology
Magic Touch (1983)	The Magic Sam Legacy (1989)	Give Me Time (1991)

The Magic Sam Legacy is a compilation of unreleased tracks by the American blues musician Magic Sam, recorded in Chicago between 1966 and 1968, that was released by the Delmark label in 1989.

== Reception ==
Professional ratings
Review scores
Source	Rating
Allmusic	4/5 stars
The Penguin Guide to Blues Recordings	3/4 stars

Allmusic reviewer Lindsay Planer stated "The 13 tracks on Magic Sam Legacy are culled from material initially discarded from his two Delmark studio LPs West Side Soul (1967) and Black Magic (1968) ... the John Lee Hooker inspired "I Feel So Good" ... and the spirited instrumental "Lookin' Good," both of which date back to 1966. ... As the recorded legacy of Magic Sam was tragically curtailed when he passed in 1969 at the age of 32, any and all titles featuring Sam as a leader could be considered essential. While recent converts might be best advised to start with either West Side Soul or Black Magic, Magic Sam Legacy is a perfect companion volume, serving artist and enthusiast exceptionally well". The Penguin Guide to Blues Recordings said "Legacy may be coming in a bit high for a record that relies heavily on recycled material .... Although it evinces little of the direction he was trying to pursue, this is nevertheless a wormhole addition to his discography".

== Track listing ==
All compositions by Magic Sam except where noted

1. "I Feel So Good" [take 2] – 2:30
2. "Lookin' Good" – 2:58
3. "Walkin' by Myself" (James A. Lane) – 3:47
4. "Hoochie Coochie Man" (Willie Dixon) – 2:43
5. "That Ain't It" – 2:47
6. "That's All I Need" [take 3] – 3:29
7. "What Have I Done Wrong?" – 3:20
8. "I Just Want a Little Bit" (Rosco Gordon) – 3:12
9. "Everything's Gonna Be Alright" – 4:04
10. "Keep on Doin' What You're Doin'" – 2:52
11. "Blues for Odie Payne" – 4:44
12. "Easy Baby" [alternate take] – 4:26 Additional track on CD release
13. "Keep on Lovin' Me Baby" (Otis Rush) – 3:23
- Recorded in Chicago on February 6, 1966 (tracks 1 & 2), October 18 & 25, 1967 (tracks 3–6), October 23, 1968 (tracks 7–9 & 12) and November 6, 1968 (tracks 10, 11 & 13)

== Personnel ==
- Magic Sam − guitar, vocals
- Shakey Jake – harmonica (tracks 3–6)
- Eddie Shaw – tenor saxophone (tracks 1, 2 & 7–13)
- Lafayette Leake (tracks 7–13), "Stockholm Slim" (Per Notini) (tracks 3–6) – piano
- Mighty Joe Young – guitar (tracks 3–13)
- Mack Thompson – bass
- Odie Payne (tracks 3–13), Bob Richey (tracks 1 & 2) – drums
