= Tail Dragger Jones =

American singer (1940–2023)

- Also known as: The Tail Dragger; Taildragger; Taildragger Jones; Crawlin' James
- Born: James Yancey Jones; September 30, 1940; Altheimer, Arkansas, U.S.
- Died: September 4, 2023 (aged 82)
- Genres: Chicago blues, electric blues
- Occupation: Singer
- Years active: 1960s–2023
- Labels: St. George, Delmark, Delta Groove

James Yancey Jones (September 30, 1940 – September 4, 2023), known professionally as Tail Dragger Jones, was an American Chicago blues singer. He performed beginning in the 1960s and released four albums. Jones gained a certain notoriety in 1993, after being convicted of second-degree murder for the killing of another blues musician, Boston Blackie.

Jones, a disciple of Howlin' Wolf, was given his nickname by his hero because of his habit of regularly arriving late at Howlin' Wolf performances.

== Life and career ==
James Yancey Jones was born in Altheimer, Arkansas, on September 30, 1940. He was raised by his grandparents after his parents separated when he was a baby. He first heard blues music as a child. He secretly listened to music on his family's battery-powered radio, which caused some consternation when the batteries were too low for his family to listen to gospel music before church each Sunday. During those formative years he saw both Sonny Boy Williamson II and Boyd Gilmore perform at a little club named Jack Rabbitts in Pine Bluff, Arkansas. After relocating to Chicago in 1966, Jones worked as an auto mechanic. He began to perform locally but got lucky when his musical hero, Howlin' Wolf, allowed Jones to sit in with him at concerts. This influence, and the raw, gritty approach he had admired in the musical stylings of Sonny Boy Williamson, Muddy Waters, and Willie Dixon, made Jones concentrate on a "low-down" style of Chicago blues. Originally he was known as Crawlin' James, a nickname he acquired from his habit of crawling around on stage while performing. Later on, Howlin' Wolf named him Tail Dragger because Jones often arrived late for gigs. By the early 1970s, Jones had become a full-time singer and he used notable backing musicians, including Willie Kent, Hubert Sumlin, Carey Bell, Kansas City Red, Little Mack Simmons, Big Leon Brooks, and Eddie Shaw.

On July 11, 1993, in Chicago, Jones shot and killed the blues artist Boston Blackie, following a heated dispute over payment that began a month earlier when both performers appeared at the Chicago Blues Festival. Jones claimed he acted in self-defense, but was convicted of second-degree murder and was incarcerated for 17 months of a four-year prison sentence.

Jones was a regular performer in Chicago blues clubs throughout the 1970s and 1980s, releasing a number of commercially unsuccessful singles. His spell in prison aside, it took until 1996 before his debut album, Crawlin' Kingsnake, was issued by St. George Records. He was 56 years old when the record was released. It was followed by the album American People (1998, Delmark Records). A DVD, My Head Is Bald: Live at Vern's Friendly Lounge, was released in 2005. Live at Rooster's Lounge was issued in 2009, also by Delmark Records. His joint work with Bob Corritore resulted in the 2012 CD and DVD release Longtime Friends in the Blues.

== Personal life and death ==
Jones was married six times and had a number of children. He died on September 4, 2023, at the age of 82.

== Discography ==
=== Albums ===
Year	Title	Record label
1996	Crawlin' Kingsnake	St. George Records
1998	American People	Delmark Records
2009	Live at Rooster's Lounge	Delmark Records
2012	Longtime Friends in the Blues (with Bob Corritore)	Delta Groove Productions

== See also ==
- List of Chicago blues musicians
- List of electric blues musicians
