= Lafayette Leake =

American musician

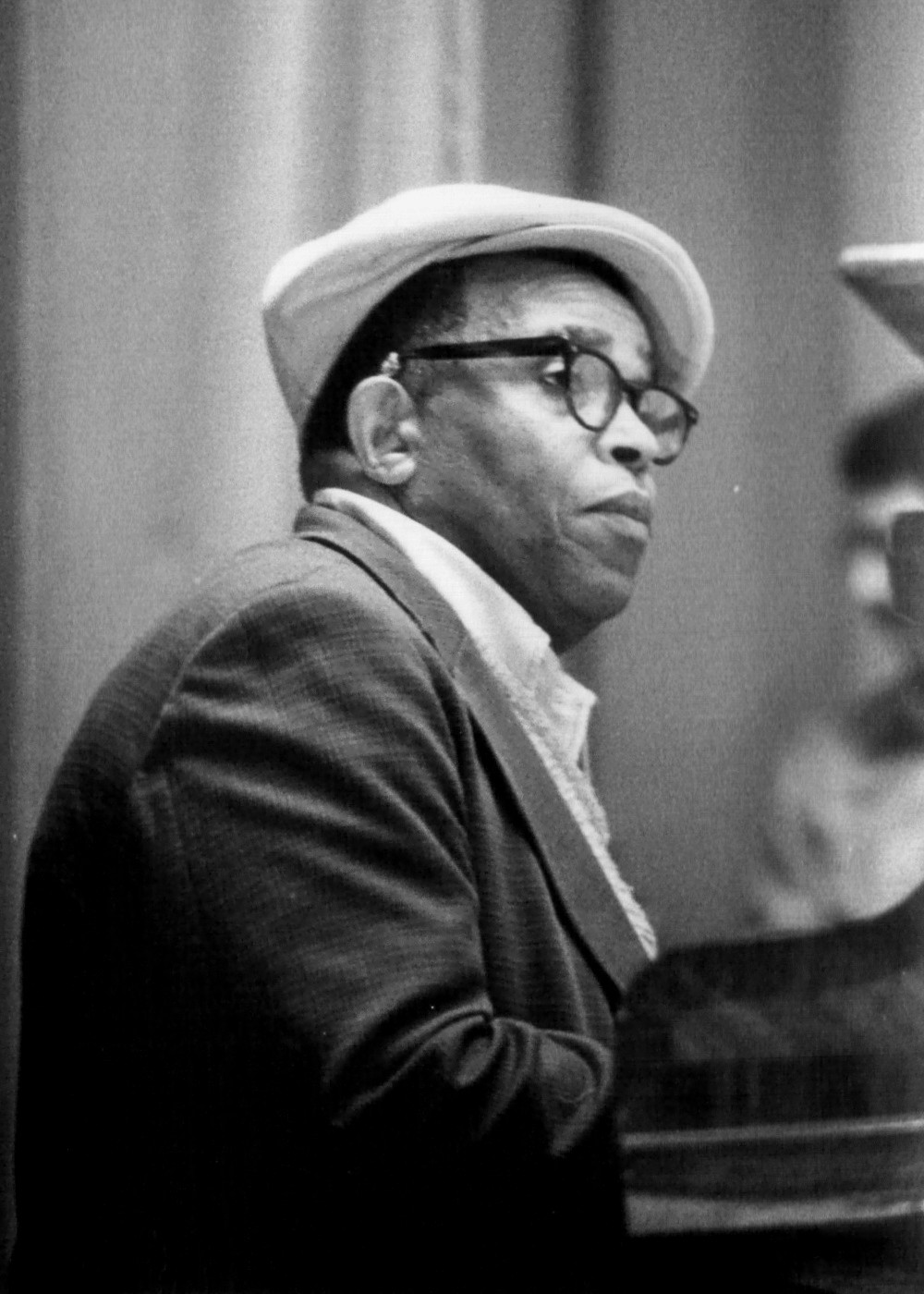
- Leake in 1978

Background information
- Born: June 1, 1919; Winona, Mississippi, U.S.
- Died: August 14, 1990 (aged 71) Chicago, Illinois, U.S.
- Genres: Chicago blues; rock and roll
- Occupation: Musician
- Instruments: Piano; organ; vocals
- Years active: 1950s–1988
- Formerly of: Chicago Blues All-Stars

Lafayette Leake (June 1, 1919 – August 14, 1990) was an American blues and jazz pianist, organist, vocalist and composer who played for Chess Records as a session musician, and as a member of the Big Three Trio, during the formative years of Chicago blues. He played piano on many of Chuck Berry's recordings.

== Biography ==
Leake was born in Winona, Mississippi, in 1919. Information about his early years is sparse, but in the early 1950s he joined the Big Three Trio (replacing Leonard Caston) and began his association with Chess Records, where he worked closely with bassist, producer, and songwriter Willie Dixon.

Leake played piano on One Dozen Berrys, Chuck Berry's second album, released in 1958 by Chess. He was then on Berry Is on Top; Leake (not Berry's longtime bandmate Johnnie Johnson) played the prominent piano on the classic original rendition of "Johnny B. Goode", as well as "Rock and Roll Music". Leake played on numerous other Chess sessions from the 1950s through the 1970s, backing many Chess musicians, including Sonny Boy Williamson, Otis Rush, Junior Wells, and Little Walter. Leake gave Chicago blues musician Harmonica Hinds his first harmonica lesson on the street in Toronto, Ontario.

During the 1960s, Willie Dixon formed the Chicago Blues All-Stars, with Leake as resident pianist. Leake toured and recorded with this group until the mid-1970s. After that he did little recording or touring, although he appeared with Berry at the Chicago Blues Festival in 1986, and recorded "Hidden Charms" with Dixon in 1988.

Besides being a respected performer, Leake was a composer. He recorded a number of his own songs as a member of various ensembles, and others have been covered by notable musicians. Fleetwood Mac, for example, recorded his song "Love That Woman" on their album The Original Fleetwood Mac. Leake's song "Wrinkles", performed by the Big Three Trio, was featured on the soundtrack of David Lynch's 1990 film, Wild at Heart. Blues band Slo Leak was named after one of Leake's instrumental pieces.

Leake fell into a diabetic coma in his home in Chicago, where he remained undiscovered for several days, dying in hospital on August 14, 1990. In 2015 the Killer Blues Headstone Project placed a headstone for Lafayette Leake at Lincoln Cemetery in Blue Island, Illinois.

== Major recordings ==
- Might is Right! (1960) Yambo/Weis
- Feel So Blue (1978) Black & Blue (France), reissued as Easy Blues (2002)

With Chuck Berry

- One Dozen Berrys (Chess, 1958)
- Berry Is on Top (Chess, 1959)

With Bo Diddley

- Hey! Good Lookin' (Checker, 1965)

With John Lee Hooker

- The Real Folk Blues (Chess, 1966)
- More Real Folk Blues: The Missing Album (Chess, 1966 [1991])

With Howlin' Wolf

- The Real Folk Blues (Chess, 1956-64 [1965])

With Magic Sam

- Black Magic (Delmark, 1968)
- The Magic Sam Legacy (Delmark, 1968 [1989])

With Sonny Boy Williamson

- The Real Folk Blues (Chess, 1947-64 [1966])
