= Ann Arbor Blues and Jazz Festival =

Music festival

- Genre: Blues, jazz
- Location: Ann Arbor, Michigan
- Years active: 1969–70, 1972–74, 1992–2006, 2017–19, 2021–present

Ann Arbor Blues and Jazz Festival is a music festival in Ann Arbor, Michigan, that started in 1972 from the Ann Arbor Blues Festival, which itself began in 1969. Although the festival has had a tumultuous history and suspended operations in 2006, it was restarted in 2017.

Although started with the support of the University of Michigan, the Ann Arbor Blues and Jazz Festival became a volunteer non-profit 501(c) event. What began as an outdoor concert became a full weekend of blues and jazz events. In addition to the daytime festival, evenings offered a choice of indoor (seated) concerts and live jazz in a club setting. Before it ceased operations in 2006, the festival organization expanded to include activities for children, educational outreach programs, and a Meet the Artist program which gave the audience a chance to meet performers.

The festival has included musicians such as Art Ensemble of Chicago, Count Basie, Booker T. & the MG's, James Brown, Ray Charles, Ornette Coleman, Miles Davis, Dr. John, Al Green, Yusef Lateef, Taj Mahal, Maceo Parker, Sun Ra, Bonnie Raitt, Pharoah Sanders, Archie Shepp, and Cecil Taylor.

== Events and venues ==
Early festivals (before 1974) were held on the "Fuller Flats" an open area on the north side of Fuller Road and just west of Huron High School. (It had been a medical waste dump site before the school was built) In 1972 the area became the Otis Spann Memorial Field when Muddy Waters presented a plaque to Spann's widow that read "The people of Ann Arbor Michigan in recognition of the talent, the genius of the late Otis Spann, sweet giant of the Blues, formally dedicate the Ann Arbor Blues and Jazz Festival, 1972 in the grounds upon which it stands to the memory of this great artist."

Although the outdoor festival was central, the Ann Arbor Blues and Jazz Festival became a daytime event. Outdoor evening shows were moved inside to venues such as the Michigan Theater and the club Bird of Paradise. In 2017, the festival returned to its roots as an outdoor event.

Saturday and Sunday outdoor concerts took place in Gallup Park, a 69-acre (28 ha) park straddling the Huron River in northeast Ann Arbor. The site can accommodate over 10,000 attendees and includes a main stage, a tent to shelter attendees, sponsor booths, a kid's tent, food and vendor booths, arts booths, the Meet the Artist tent, and a backstage hospitality area reserved for artists, sponsors, and their guests. The largest evening concert took place in the restored Michigan Theater. Headline jazz and blues artists appeared.

The Bird of Paradise Jazz Club, run by jazz musicians in Ann Arbor, attracted jazz aficionados to two Friday night and two Saturday night concerts. The Bird of Paradise closed in 2004.

Honoring its origin as an outdoor festival, the Ann Arbor Blues Festival 2017 was on a grassy field at Washtenaw Farm Council Fairgrounds, a few miles to the southwest of the 1969 festival.

== History ==
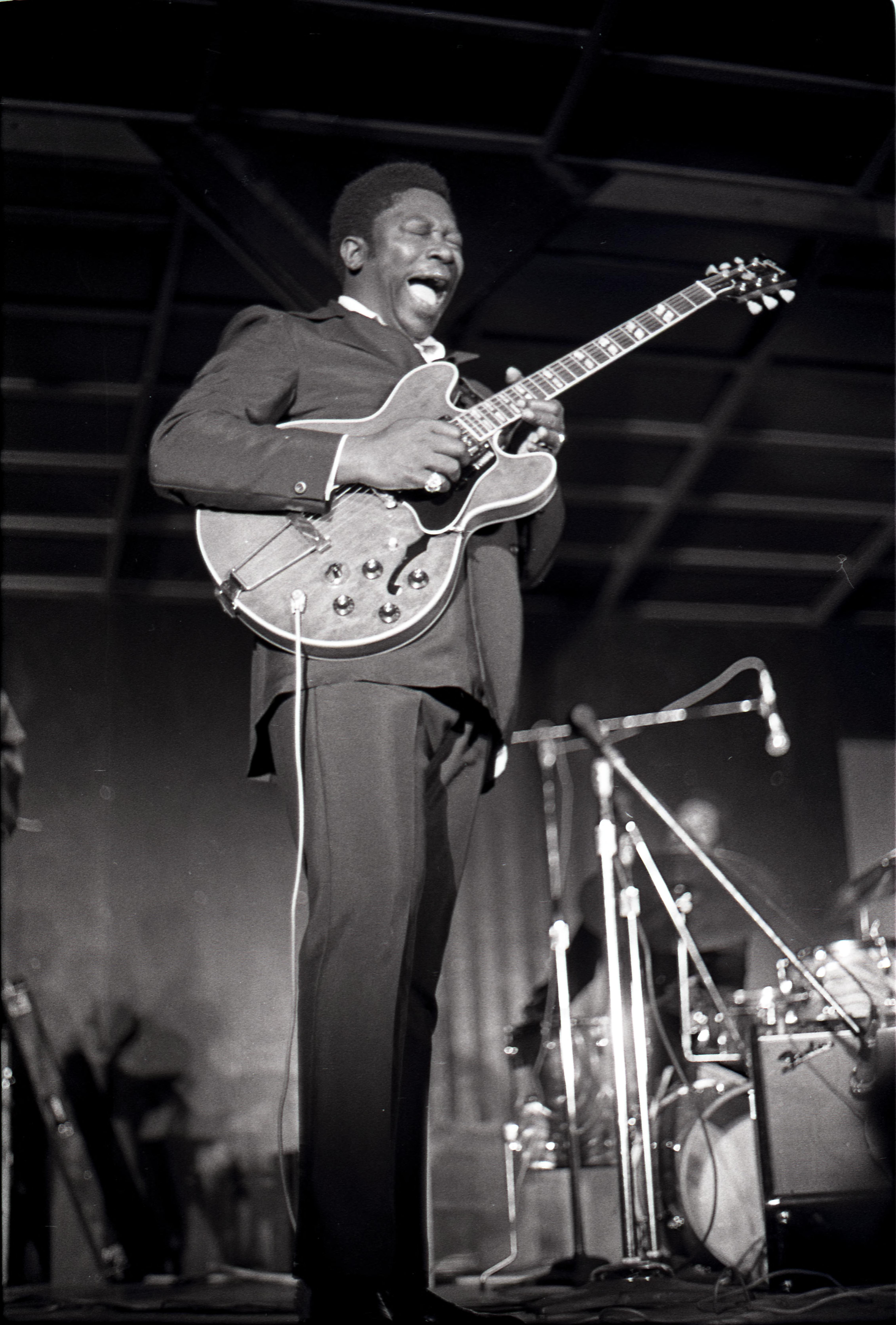
B.B. King performing in 1969

The first North American blues festival, where blues was the main attraction, particularly modern electric blues, was the Ann Arbor Blues Festival in 1969. Musicians at the festival included Clifton Chenier, Son House, J. B. Hutto, B.B. King, Freddie King, Magic Sam, Sam Lay, Jimmy "Fast Fingers" Dawkins, Otis Rush, Charlie Musselwhite, Roosevelt Sykes, Muddy Waters, T-Bone Walker, Big Mama Thornton, Junior Wells, and Howlin' Wolf. An album containing various musicians performances at that Festival was released in 2019. It debuted at number 10 in the Billboard Blues Albums Chart in the week of August 17, 2019.

The Ann Arbor Blues Festival was created and organized by a group of University of Michigan students led by Cary Gordon, a native of suburban Detroit, and John Fishel, who grew up in Cleveland and had transferred to Michigan from Tulane University. The festival was sponsored first by the university with help later from the Canterbury House, an Episcopal group which owned a folk club in Ann Arbor.

To educate themselves more about the blues, Fishel and other students took a field trip to Chicago. They met Bob Koester, owner of the Jazz Record Mart and Delmark Records, a blues record label in the basement of his record store. Koester directed them to bars and clubs where they could hear blues musicians, in addition to giving them names, addresses, and phone numbers. Back at school, the blues committee wanted to promote the upcoming festival with a rehearsal concert to introduce students to the blues. The Luther Allison Trio performed at the Michigan Union Ballroom in the spring before the festival was to take place.

Fishel felt a sense of urgency to organize the second festival in 1970 due to the deaths and ages of blues musicians. With help from Ken Whipple and Mark Platt, Fishel again took a trip to Chicago looking for acts who would play at the festival. This time it included Carey Bell, Buddy Guy, Junior Parker, Sunnyland Slim, Hound Dog Taylor, Johnny Young. They looked outside Chicago to attract Bobby Bland, Juke Boy Bonner, Pee Wee Crayton, Lowell Fulson, John Jackson, Papa George Lightfoot, Mance Lipscomb, Big Joe Turner, Robert Pete Williams, and Eddie Cleanhead Vinson.

In 1970, attendance was down because of a simultaneous rock concert at Goose Lake International Music Festival, resulting in a financial loss for the festival.

=== Expansion ===
After the loss in 1970, the university was unwilling to fund an unprofitable event, so the festival was canceled in 1971. The expansion of the Ann Arbor Blues Festival in 1972 was the work of Peter Andrews and John Sinclair. Andrews had managed bands and promoted music in Ann Arbor for several years on his own and under the auspices of the University of Michigan in his position as events coordinator. He had business experience and promotional skills. Sinclair was a blues fan who had been manager of the MC5. Sinclair provided the creative side of the equation and Andrews the business and booking skills. They planned to continue the festival with modifications.

First, they expanded the festival to include other genres, such as jazz and rhythm and blues, so it became the Ann Arbor Blues and Jazz Festival. Second, while preserving the blues acts of the times, they wanted to add enough headliners to increase attendance and profitability. They had no financial supporters, but Sinclair found a friend willing to contribute $20,000.

In 1972 and 1973, the addition of headline acts like Ray Charles and Miles Davis drew more people. The 1973 festival incorporated a Detroit blues review and Bobo Jenkins was one of the headline acts, along with Mr. Bo. Music from this performance was issued in 1995 by Schoolkids Records with two songs by Jenkins. Two tracks by One String Sam, who also performed at the festival, were released in 1998.

=== 1974 ===
In 1974, the festival promoters were denied permission to hold the event in Ann Arbor, so the 1974 festival was held at the campus of St. Clair College in Windsor, Ontario, Canada. Preparations included carpools for taking fans from Michigan to Canada. But the FBI and other law enforcement officials prevented fans from crossing the border.

They prevented John Sinclair, co-producer of the festival, from entering Canada. No reasons were given at the border for turning back cars. Cars were searched. Any drugs that were found were detained and their occupants arrested. At the gates in Windsor anyone found smoking marijuana or carrying it was arrested and taken to jail. The festival lost over $100,000.

=== 1990s–2007 ===
For several years the festival was inactive. Andrews approached city officials about reinstating the festival. He was sent to the Parks Department, where he was turned down. Andrews was helped by Lee Berry, a music promoter in Ann Arbor who bypassed the parks commission and addressed the city council. After eighty meetings, the council voted unanimously to restart the festival. Changes in 1992 included the introduction of venues in addition to all-day and all-night outdoor concerts. Outdoor night concerts were replaced by indoor events, including sit-down concerts at the Michigan Theater and night shows at the Bird of Paradise.

The Ann Arbor Blues and Jazz Festival was again under the direction of Andrews and scheduled to begin as a free festival in the fall of 2007. The festival and the city tried to collaborate to continue the event. But the festival was not held in 2007.

=== 2017–19, since 2021 ===
Following its hiatus of over a decade, the Ann Arbor Blues Festival was held on August 19, 2017. Encouraged by local blues performer Chris Canas, Ann Arbor resident and founder of the Ann Arbor Blues Society, James Partridge promoted and managed the event. The single-day festival was at the Washtenaw Farm Council Fairgrounds (42°12′41″N 83°47′41″W). Performers included Blair Miller, Tino G's Dumpster Machine, Alabama Slim, Hank Mowery & the Hawktones (featuring guitarist Kate Moss), the Norman Jackson Band, the Chris Canas Band, Eliza Neals and the Narcotics (featuring Billy Davis), the Nick Moss Band, and Benny Turner & Real Blues. Although Melvyn "Deacon" Jones and Brandon "Taz" Niederaurer were scheduled to be Benny Turner's guests, circumstances prevented either from appearing. Deacon Jones died on July 6, 2017, and Niederaurer's travel arrangements were foiled due to inclement weather. Nick Moss replaced Niederaurer on guitar at the festival. The 2017 Ann Arbor Blues Festival was dedicated to Deacon Jones. The 2019 Ann Arbor 50th Anniversary celebration was on August 16–18 performers include: The Allman Betts Band, Bernard Allison, Thornetta Davis, Alex Johnson, Benny Turner, John Primer, Mindi Abair and the Bone Shakers, Lindsay Beaver, The Sam Lay Band, Eliza Neals and the Narcotics, Kara Grainger, Doug Deming & the Jewel Tones, Laith al-Saadi, Danielle Nicole, Vanessa Collier, Harper & Midwest Kind and Altered Five Blues Band.

Another hiatus came in 2020 before it resumed in 2021.

=== Discography ===
Various performances have been released as records and CDs over the years. These include:

- Magic Sam, Magic Sam Live (Delmark, 1969 [1981])
- Ann Arbor Blues Festival 1969: Vols 1&2, Third Man Records, Americana Music Productions, Inc. 2019. This release was chosen as a 'Favorite Blues Album' by AllMusic.
- Ann Arbor Blues & Jazz Festival 1972: Recorded live at Otis Spann Memorial Field, Atlantic Recording Corporation SD 2-502, 1973
- Art Ensemble of Chicago, Bap-Tizum, Atlantic Records, September 9, 1972, 1973
- Sun Ra, Sun Ra & His Intergalactic Arkestra, Sun Ra, Sun Ra & His Intergalactic Arkestra: at the Ann Arbor Blues & Jazz Festival In Exile 1974: It is Forbidden, Alive Total Energy Records, 2001
- Miles Davis, Complete Ann Arbor 1972, Mega Disc Legendary Collection, 2011

== See also ==
- List of jazz festivals
- List of blues festivals
