= Simmons Records =

Simmons Records may refer to:

- Simmons Records, a record label of blues singers in Chicago owned by Little Mack Simmons
- Simmons Records, a record label owned by Gene Simmons lead singer of the band Kiss
