= Mighty Joe Young (musician) =

American Chicago blues guitarist

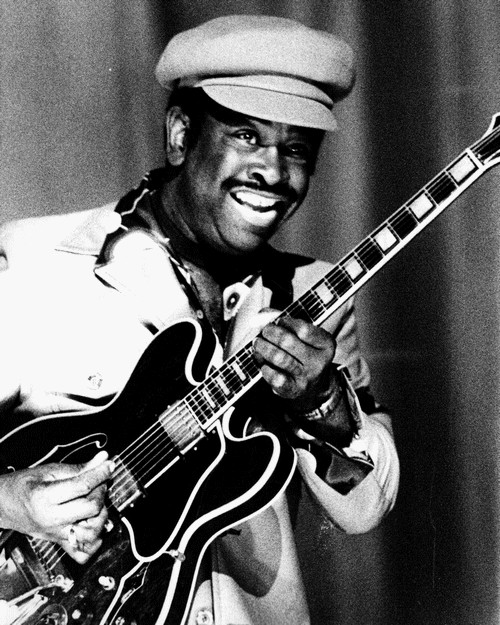
- Young in 1976

Background information
- Born: Joseph Young Jr. September 23, 1927; Shreveport, Louisiana, U.S.
- Died: March 24, 1999 (aged 71) Chicago, Illinois, U.S.
- Genres: Chicago blues; soul blues
- Occupations: Musician; songwriter
- Instruments: Guitar; vocals
- Years active: 1950s–1980s
- Labels: Sonet; Delmark; Blind Pig; Fire

Joseph Young Jr. (September 23, 1927 – March 24, 1999), known as Mighty Joe Young, was an American Chicago blues guitarist.

== Biography ==
Young was born in Shreveport, Louisiana, moving to Milwaukee in about 1945. He was an amateur boxer in the 1940s, but he later recalled that "It was nothing to write home about... I decided that music was the best thing to do." He began his music career in the early 1950s, singing on the Milwaukee nightclub circuit and taking his stage name after the film of the same name. In 1955, he returned to Louisiana to make his recording debut, for Jiffy Records.

He then moved to Chicago, where he worked as a sideman, notably with Joe Little & his Heart Breakers and later Billy Boy Arnold. After recording "Why Baby" / "Empty Arms" for Bobby Robinson's Fire Records in 1961, he performed with Otis Rush in the early 1960s, playing on Rush's album Cold Day in Hell. He also continued to record under his own name for small labels such as Webcor, Celtex, and Jacklyn. He played on Magic Sam's albums West Side Soul and Black Magic and also worked with Jimmy Rogers, Willie Dixon, Tyrone Davis and Jimmy Dawkins.

Young's album Blues with a Touch of Soul was released by Delmark Records in 1971, and two further albums followed on the Ovation label in the mid-1970s.

Young regularly performed in the 1970s and 1980s at the Wise Fools Pub in Chicago. His song "Turning Point" was used in the feature film Thief (1981), directed by Michael Mann.

In 1986 he began work on an album, eventually released in 1997 as Mighty Man. After he underwent surgery on a pinched nerve in his neck, he developed numbness in his fingers, which affected his ability to play guitar. In 1998, he underwent further surgery on his spine in an attempt to regain feeling in his fingers, but he died at the age of 71 after developing pneumonia.

== Appraisal ==
Young's mid-1970s Ovation LPs were said by AllMusic's Bill Dahl to have "showcased the guitarist's blues-soul synthesis". Reviewing Young's 1976 self-titled LP in Christgau's Record Guide: Rock Albums of the Seventies (1981), Robert Christgau wrote: "If Young's voice weren't as gruffly workaday as his guitar, he might be a threat—he's got a knack for the blues subject, from mama-in-law to barbecue to what money can buy. Even with the stupid string synthesizer butting in, this is a solid, coverable groove album."

== Discography ==
- Blues with a Touch of Soul (Delmark), 1971
- Legacy of the Blues, vol. 4 (Sonet), 1972
- Chicken Heads (Ovation), 1974
- Mighty Joe Young (Ovation), 1976
- Bluesy Josephine (Black and Blue), 1976
- Love Gone (Ovation), 1978
- Live at the Wise Fools Pub (Aim Trading Group), 1978
- Mighty Man (Blind Pig), 1997

With Magic Sam

- West Side Soul (Delmark, 1967)
- Black Magic (Delmark, 1968)
- The Magic Sam Legacy (Delmark, 1967/68 [1989])

== See also ==
- List of nicknames of blues musicians
