= Give Me Time =

Studio album by Magic Sam
- Released: 1991
- Recorded: January 1968
- Studio: Magic Sam's House, Chicago
- Genre: Blues
- Length: 38:14
- Label: Delmark
- Producer: Robert G. Koester, Steve Wagner

Magic Sam chronology
| The Magic Sam Legacy (1991) | Give Me Time (1991) | Rockin' Wild in Chicago (2002) |

Give Me Time is an album of home recordings by the American blues musician Magic Sam, recorded at his house in Chicago in 1968, that was released by the Delmark label in 1991.

== Reception ==
Professional ratings
Review scores
| Source | Rating |
|---|---|
| AllMusic | 4/5 stars |
| The Penguin Guide to Blues Recordings | 2.5/4 stars |

AllMusic reviewer Lindsay Planer wrote:

These intimate home tapes from Magic Sam were documented a year before his untimely passing in 1969 ... As this collection aptly demonstrates, he is at the top of his game during the informal get together. Epitomizing the D.I.Y. ethos, Sam is heard unadorned, backing himself up on electric guitar ... In a stripped down setting, the purity of Sam's soulful fretwork, coupled with the lack of a rhythm section, seemingly amplifies his clean and ultimately melodic execution ... The dearth of Magic Sam's legacy has made each and every entry essential and Give Me Time is a testament to both his prowess as a musician as well as the crucial offerings that he made to modern blues.".

The Penguin Guide to Blues Recordings said "He confines his guitar work to chords and riffs but doesn't stint when a song requires his full voice. Sound quality is acceptable but by the nature this is a record supplementary to the requirements for all but the dedicated collector".

== Track listing ==
All compositions by Magic Sam except where noted

1. "Give Me Time" – 3:28
2. "You Belong to Me" – 3:49
3. "That's Why I'm Crying" – 3:25
4. "You're So Fine" – 2:55
5. "Come into My Arms" – 1:55
6. "I Can't Quit You Baby" (Willie Dixon) – 3:54
7. "Sweet Little Angel" (Unknown) – 3:14
8. "That's All I Need" – 1:50
9. "What Have I Done Wrong?" – 4:37
10. "Baby, You Torture My Soul" – 3:44
11. "I'm So Glad" (Skip James) – 2:18
12. "Shake a Hand" – 2:56

== Personnel ==
- Magic Sam − guitar, vocals
- Eddie Boyd – vocals (track 5)
