= Live at the Avant Garde =

Live album by Magic Sam
- Released: November 18, 2013
- Recorded: June 22, 1968
- Venue: The Avant Garde, Milwaukee, Wisconsin
- Genre: Blues
- Length: 67:40
- Label: Delmark
- Producer: Jim Charne, Robert G. Koester

Magic Sam chronology
Rockin' Wild in Chicago (2002)	Live at the Avant Garde (2013)

Live at the Avant Garde is a live album by the American blues musician Magic Sam that was released by Delmark Records in 2013. It contains tracks recorded live at the Avant Garde in Milwaukee, Wisconsin, on June 22, 1968.

== Reception ==
Professional ratings
Review scores
Source	Rating
AllMusic	4/5 stars
PopMatters	8/10 stars

Allmusic reviewer Mark Deming stated "for an amateur audience tape recorded in 1968, Live at the Avant Garde sounds remarkably good, with the instruments sounding clean and rich and Sam's voice suffering just a touch of distortion from the PA system. Magic Sam never broke through to real stardom, but he made a big impression during his short time in the spotlight, and Live at the Avant Garde shows he never dogged it, not even on a coffeehouse gig in Wisconsin, hardly a show where a blues legend would be expected to pull out all the stops".

David Maine of PopMatters writes, "Magic Sam Live at the Avant Garde is a time capsule from the days when this Chicago blues trio could step into a Milwaukee club and tear the place up ... the band is simultaneously energetic, laid back and tighter than a watch spring ... There’s no showing off here, as Sam is a practitioner of the “less is more” school of guitar wizardry, but the solos are extensive and note-perfect without being busy ... this recording stands as a testament to his mastery".

== Track listing ==
All compositions by Samuel Maghett except where noted

1. "San-Ho-Zay" (instrumental) (Freddie King, Sonny Thompson) − 4:01
2. "Don´t Want No Woman" (Don Robey) − 3:37
3. "I Need You So Bad" (B.B. King, Sam Ling) − 4:22
4. "Feelin´ Good" (Herman Parker) − 4:28
5. "It´s All Your Fault Baby" (Lowell Fulson) − 4:31
6. "You Belong to Me" − 4:10
7. "Bad Luck Blues" − 3:14
8. "Come On in This House" (Amos Blakemore) − 3:46
9. "Hoochie Coochie Man" (Willie Dixon) − 3:21
10. "Still a Fool" (Muddy Waters) − 3:32
11. "That´s All I Need" − 4:32
12. "All Your Love (I Miss Loving)" (Otis Rush) − 3:58
13. "That´s All Right" (Jimmy Rogers) − 3:07
14. "I Found Me a New Love" (Little Milton, Bob Lyons) − 4:25 Additional track on 2LP release
15. "Lookin' Good" (instrumental) − 4:20
16. "Everynight and Everyday" (Jimmy McCracklin) − 3:41
17. "Hully Gully Twist" (instrumental) (B.B. King, Joe Josea) − 3:43

== Personnel ==
- Magic Sam − guitar, vocals
- Robert "Big Mojo" Elem – bass
- Bob Richey – drums
