= Magic Sam Live =

Live album by Magic Sam
- Released: 1981
- Recorded: October 1963, February 1964 and August 3, 1969
- Venue: The Alex Club, Chicago and the Ann Arbor Blues Festival, Ann Arbor, Michigan
- Genre: Blues
- Length: 75:45
- Label: Delmark; DL-645/646
- Producer: Steve Tomashefsky

Magic Sam chronology
Black Magic (1968)	Magic Sam Live (1981)	Magic Touch (1983)

Magic Sam Live is a live album by the American blues musician Magic Sam, recorded in Chicago in 1963/63 and at the first Ann Arbor Blues Festival in Michigan in 1969, that was released by the Delmark label in 1981.

== Reception ==
Professional ratings
Review scores
Source	Rating
Allmusic	4/5 stars
The Penguin Guide to Blues Recordings	4/4 stars

Allmusic reviewer Al Campbell stated "While the sound quality leaves something to be desired, fans of electric Chicago blues should hear Magic Sam Live. Recorded at two separate locations ... this disc captures the raw energy not only of the musicians, but the crowds' tremendous response to them. ... Ignore the rotten sound quality, this is raw blues power and provides a priceless document of Sam Maghett's vital showmanship". The Penguin Guide to Blues Recordings said "The gig tapes ... are of indifferent quality but they can't mask the energy coming from the bandstand. Sam was a talented guitarist but that was merely an adjunct to the forceful personality projected on his vocals ... Sam sweeps all before him, accustomed to leading from the front and grateful if musicians keep up".

== Track listing ==
All compositions by Magic Sam except where noted

Disc One: At the Alex Club, 1963/64

1. "Every Night About This Time" (Dave Bartholomew, Fats Domino) − 3:44
2. "I Don't Believe You'd Let Me Down" − 4:19
3. "Mole's Blues" − 4:49
4. "I Just Got to Know" − 4:22
5. "Tore Down" (Sonny Thompson) − 3:18
6. "You Were Wrong" − 5:14
7. "Backstroke" 3:48
8. "Come On in This House" (Junior Wells) − 4:07
9. "Looking Good" − 3:17 Omitted from single CD reissue
10. "Riding High" − 1:41
- Recorded at The Alex Club, Chicago in October 1963 (tracks 1, 2, 4, 6 & 9) and February 1964 (tracks 3, 5, 7, 8 & 10)

Disc Two: At the Ann Arbor Blues Festival, 1969

1. "San-Ho-Zay" − 2:31
2. "I Need You So Bad" (B.B. King, Sam Ling) − 4:15
3. "You Don't Love Me" − 4:04 Omitted from single CD reissue
4. "Strange Things Happening" (Percy Mayfield) − 4:10
5. "I Feel So Good (I Wanna Boogie)" − 4:54
6. "All Your Love" − 4:55
7. "Sweet Home Chicago" (Robert Johnson) − 3:28
8. "I Got Papers On You, Baby" − 3:30 Omitted from single CD reissue
9. "Looking Good" − 3:33
10. "Looking Good (Encore)" − 1:46
- Recorded at the Ann Arbor Blues Festival, Ann Arbor, Michigan on August 3, 1969

== Personnel ==
- Magic Sam − guitar, vocals
- Eddie Shaw – tenor saxophone (Disc One)
- Tyrone Carter – electric piano (Disc One: tracks 1, 2, 4, 6 & 9)
- Mac Thompson – bass, vocals (Disc One)
- Bruce Barlow – bass (Disc Two)
- Bob Richey – drums (Disc One: tracks 1, 2, 4, 6 & 9)
- "Huckleberry Hound" (Robert Wright) – drums (Disc One: tracks 3, 5, 7, 8 & 10)
- Sam Lay – drums (Disc Two)
