= Oakridge Cemetery =

Cemetery in Hillside, Chicago, Illinois, US

Oakridge Cemetery Mausoleum Chapel & Crematorium
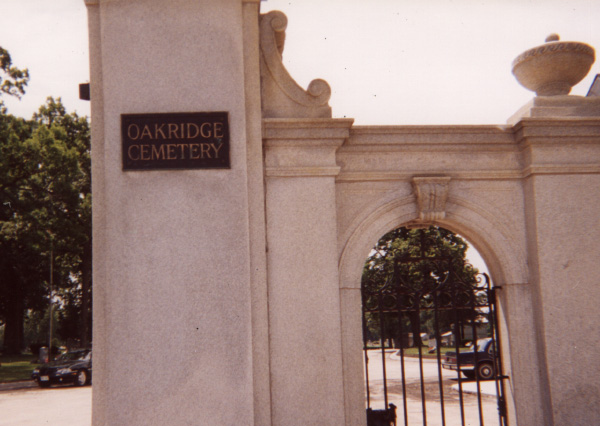
- The front gates of Oakridge Cemetery
- Interactive map of Oakridge Cemetery Mausoleum Chapel & Crematorium

Details
- Established: 1899
- Location: Hillside, Illinois
- Country: United States
- Coordinates: 41°51′46″N 87°53′24″W
- No. of graves: >43,000
- Find a Grave: Oakridge Cemetery Mausoleum Chapel & Crematorium

Oakridge Cemetery is a cemetery located in the village of Hillside, near Chicago. It is the largest non-sectarian mausoleum in Cook County, Illinois.

The cemetery is located at 4301 West Roosevelt Road, Hillside, IL 60162.

== Notable burials ==
- Beverly Blossom (1926–2014)
- Milton R. Brunson, gospel singer (1929–1997)
- Chester Burnett, a.k.a. Howlin' Wolf (1910–1976)
- Colonel Daniel Cameron (1828–1879)
- James Carter of James Carter and the Prisoners (1926–2003)
- Tyrone Davis (1938–2005)
- Robert "Big Mojo" Elem (1928–1997)
- Harold Gray (1894–1968)
- Erv Lange (1887–1971)
- Bob Reynolds, American football player – (1939–1996)
- Jimmy Slagle (1873–1956)
- Tuffy Stewart (1883–1934)
- Arbee Stidham (1917–1988), blues musician
- Darryl Stingley (1951–2007)
- Victims of the Eastland Disaster (1915)
- Victims of American Airlines Flight 191 (1979)
- Johnny "Big Moose" Walker (1927–1999), Chicago blues keyboardist
