= Mighty Man (album) =

Studio album by Mighty Joe Young
- Released: 1997
- Genre: Blues, soul
- Label: Blind Pig
- Producer: Mighty Joe Young

Mighty Joe Young chronology
Live at the Wise Fools Pub (1978)	Mighty Man (1997)

Mighty Man is an album by the American musician Mighty Joe Young, released in 1997. It was his first album for Blind Pig Records, although the label would reissue some of Young's earlier work. Young supported the album with a North American tour.

Mighty Man was nominated for a W. C. Handy Award for best Soul Blues Album. Living Blues awarded the album "Comeback of the Year".

== Production ==
The album was produced primarily by Young. Due to recurring health issues involving a pinched nerve, he worked on the album over the course of 11 years. Young financed the recording sessions. He played guitar on three of the tracks, all recorded prior to his surgeries. "Got a Hold on Me" was written by Willie Henderson.

== Critical reception ==
Professional ratings
Review scores
Source	Rating
AllMusic	4/5 stars
MusicHound Blues: The Essential Album Guide	4/5 stars
The Penguin Guide to Blues Recordings	4/4 stars

The Milwaukee Journal Sentinel wrote that "Young's smooth, deep soul man's voice enlivens this solid comeback album, which climbs to spectacular only when Young poignantly tries lead guitar." OffBeat determined that "Young knows how to use backup-singing women and horn-playing men without turning them into mere gimmicks." The Michigan Chronicle deemed Young "a master of pure Chicago blues mixed with equal parts of ... smooth, soul blues."

The St. Louis Post-Dispatch noted that "Bring It On" "makes a fine, bleary-blue ballad." The Chicago Tribune said that "Young still sings mightily, blending soul grooves into his West Side-styled blues." The Sonoma West Times & News deemed the album "a blues set of surpassing warmth and dignity."

AllMusic called the album "soul music deluxe with strong blues roots." The Penguin Guide to Blues Recordings considered Mighty Man among the "truly exceptional" blues albums.

== Track listing ==
No.	Title	Length
1.	"Starvation"
2.	"Mighty Man"
3.	"Turning Point"
4.	"Got My Mind on My Woman"
5.	"Got a Hold on Me"
6.	"Bring It On"
7.	"End of the Line"
8.	"Ain't Goin' for That"
9.	"Wishy Washy Woman"
10.	"On the Move Again"
