= Hayden Thompson =

American singer-songwriter (1938–2025)

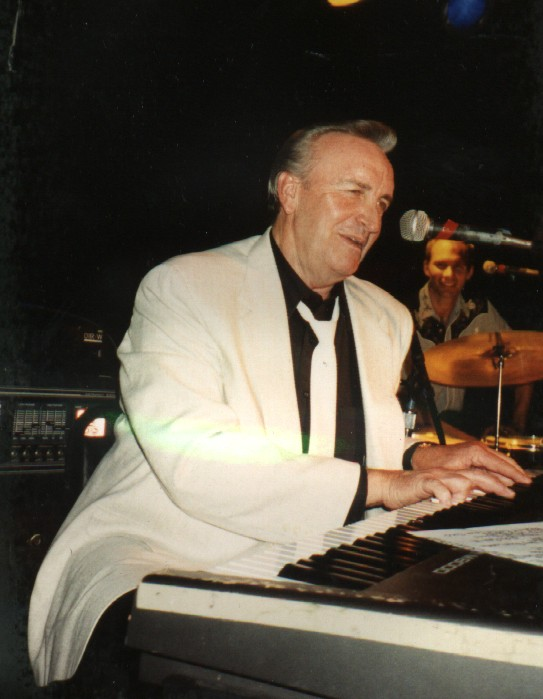
- Thompson in 1992

Background information
- Born: March 5, 1938; Booneville, Mississippi, U.S.
- Died: December 31, 2025 (aged 87) Glenview, Illinois, U.S.
- Genres: Rockabilly, rock and roll, country
- Occupations: Guitarist, musician, songwriter
- Instruments: Guitar, vocals
- Years active: 1953–?

Hayden Thompson (March 5, 1938 – December 31, 2025) was an American singer, songwriter and rockabilly musician. He is a member of the Rockabilly Hall of Fame.

== Life and career ==
Thompson was born in Booneville, Mississippi, United States. During high school Thompson formed the Southern Melody Boys, who made a 1954 recording which led from a radio session. "I Feel the Blues Coming On" was sung by Thompson and gave them another radio appearance on the "Louisiana Hayride" show. Thompson then joined the Dixie Jazzlanders who toured Mississippi. He relocated to Memphis, Tennessee and made an unreleased recording in 1956. "Love My Baby" was issued on the Phillips International label in September 1957, and Thompson toured alongside Sonny Burgess and Billy Lee Riley. The following year, Thompson moved again, this time to Chicago, Illinois, where he gained a residency at Highwood's Tally Ho Club and at the Rivoli Ballroom, Chicago's latest country music venue. He played three times at Nashville's Grand Ole Opry in 1966.

Thompson's recording of "$16.88" for Kapp Records, sold sufficiently to secure him an offer to record his debut album. Here's Hayden Thompson was released in 1967. Several recordings took place in the early-1970s, but circumstances meant that Thompson left the music industry at this point and worked as a limo driver. He re-emerged in the mid-1980s, becoming a regular performer on European rockabilly revival tours Charly Records released an album of his in 1985. Further albums were released, mainly by various European record labels, over the three decades. These included The Time Is Now (1990).

Thompson died in Glenview, Illinois, on December 31, 2025, at the age of 87.

== Albums ==
Year	TITLE/track listing	Catalog number
Kapp Records (US)
1967	Here's Hayden Thompson Life's Gone And Slipped Away / You Don't Have To Be A Baby To Cry / I'll Kiss You Again / Tell Me That's The Way It Will Be / We Know / Sixteen Eighty-Eight / Blue Blue Day / Waiting on Her / These Boots Are Made For Walkin' / Why / Look Who's Coming / And She Cried	KL-1507 (LP)
Charly Records (UK)
1985	Booneville Mississippi Flash Ah Poor Little Baby / Drivin' Me Out of My Mind / Born To Lose / Had A Little Talk / Don't Say That You're Sorry / I'm Gonna Sit Right Down And Cry / Eenie Meenie Minie Mo / Hands of Time / The Boy From Tupelo / I Wanna Get Home / A Girl Named Betty / When My Blue Moon Turns To Gold Again	CR 30245 (LP)
Sunjay Records (SWE)
1985	The Rockin' Country Man Ah Poor Little Baby / Drivin' Me Out of My Mind / Born To Lose / Had A Little Talk / Don't Say That You're Sorry / I'm Gonna Sit Right Down And Cry / Eenie Meenie Minie Mo / Hands of Time / The Boy From Tupelo / I Wanna Get Home / When My Blue Moon Turns to Gold Again / A Girl Named Betty reissue of Charly CR 30245	SJLP 563 (LP)
1990	The Time Is Now Pretty Little Love Song / Wishful Thinking / Fried Chicken / Wrong Road Again / At The Party Tonight / I Still Miss Someone / Ain't That Loving You Baby / Tell Me That's The Way It'll Be / I Ain't Taking No Prisoners / Stonecold Heart / Careless Hands / Boy From Tupelo	SJLP 589 (LP)
Spark Records (HOL)
1990	The Time Is Now Pretty Little Love Song / Wishful Thinking / Fried Chicken / Wrong Road Again / At The Party Tonight / I Still Miss Someone / Ain't That Loving You Baby / Tell Me That's The Way It'll Be / I Ain't Taking No Prisoners / Stonecold Heart / Careless Hands / Boy From Tupelo reissue of Sunjay SJLP 589	CD 13 (LP)
St. George Records (USA)
2005	Rockabilly Rhythm Mama's Little Baby / Love My Baby / Rockabilly Boogie / Reelin' & Rockin' / Milk Cow Blues Boogie / Let's Get Gone / Sugar-Coated Love / Boppin' High School Baby / Chicago River Blues / Hang Out / Can't Hardly Stand It / Gonna Rock & Roll Tonight / Boppin' The Blues / Blue Moon of Kentucky	STG 7714 (CD)
Bluelight Records (FIN)
2007	Hayden Thompson Sorrow Break A Good Man Down / Black Cloud / Big River / Just To Satisfy You / I've Got It Again / Sixteen Dollars Eighty-eight Cents / Midnight Blues / I'd Run A Mile To You / I Wanna Get Home / Ninety Seven More To Go / Drive Me Out of My Mind / Four Strong Winds / No Love Have I / Still Nineteen / Mystery Train a.k.a. The Happy Song	BLR 33132 2 (CD)
2010	Standing Tall Hurtin' Inside / Honey 'Cause I Love You / Pretty Lou / Still Loving You / Without Love / Long Black Train / Lookout Mabel / Crazy Arms / Where The Rio De Rosa Flows / Whatcha Gonna Do / Country Girls / Love My Baby / Don't Tell Me Your Troubles / Hey Porter / You're A Heartbreaker / Cheese & Crackers (aka Happy Song #2) / bonus CD "Live with the Barnshakers": Rockabilly Gal / You Win Again / Blues Blues Blues / Don't You Worry / Midnight Blues	BLR 33144 2 (CD) BLR 331449 (2-CD)
2016	Booneville Mississippi Flash / The Time Is Now Ah Poor Little Baby / Drivin' Me Out of My Mind / Born To Lose / Had A Little Talk / Don't Say That You're Sorry / I'm Gonna Sit Right Down And Cry / Eenie Meenie Minie Mo / Hands of Time / The Boy From Tupelo (1985 version) / I Wanna Get Home / A Girl Named Betty / When My Blue Moon Turns To Gold Again / Pretty Little Love Song / Wishful Thinking / Fried Chicken / Wrong Road Again / At The Party Tonight / I Still Miss Someone / Ain't That Loving You Baby / Tell Me That's The Way It'll Be / I Ain't Taking No Prisoners / Stonecold Heart / Careless Hands / Boy From Tupelo (1990 version) / What'm I Gonna Do / Cry Cry Cry / You Are My Sunshine / Wrong Road Again (1995 version) / Keys to My Kingdom reissue of Charly CR 30245 and Sunjay SJLP 589 with bonus tracks	BLR 33135 2 (CD)
2017	Learning the Game	(CD) (LP)

== Compilations ==
- Love My Baby (1999) (Collection of earlier work)
