= Mouth Harp Blues =

Studio album by Shakey Jake
- Released: 1961
- Recorded: November 17, 1960
- Studio: Van Gelder Studio, Englewood Cliffs, NJ
- Genre: Blues
- Length: 35:35
- Label: Bluesville; BVLP 1027
- Producer: Ozzie Cadena

Shakey Jake chronology
| Good Times (1960) | Mouth Harp Blues (1961) | Further On Up the Road (1969) |

Mouth Harp Blues is an album by blues musician Shakey Jake Harris recorded in 1960 and released on the Bluesville label the following year.

== Reception ==
Professional ratings
Review scores
| Source | Rating |
|---|---|
| AllMusic | 4/5 stars |
| The Penguin Guide to Blues Recordings | 2/4 stars |

AllMusic reviewer Bill Dahl stated: "When Harris returned to New Jersey later that same year to wax his Bluesville encore, he brought along fellow Chicagoan Jimmie Lee Robinson as his guitarist. A full rhythm section was used this time (New York cats all), but the overall approach was quite a bit closer to what he was used to hearing on Chicago's West side". The Penguin Guide to Blues Recordings considers the accompaniment to be not entirely suited to Harris’s style, and the album not to be one of his best.

== Track listing ==
All compositions by Jimmy D. Harris (Shakey Jake) except where noted

1. "Mouth Harp Blues" – 5:00
2. "Love My Baby" – 3:15
3. "Jake's Cha Cha" – 2:05
4. "Gimme a Smile" – 4:25
5. "My Broken Heart" – 3:10
6. "Angry Lover" (Armand "Jump" Jackson) – 3:00
7. "Things Is Alright" – 2:15
8. "Easy Baby" – 5:00
9. "Things Are Different Baby" (Ozzie Cadena) – 5:15
10. "It Won't Happen Again" – 2:10

== Personnel ==
=== Performance ===
- Shakey Jake – harmonica, vocals
- Jimmie Lee – guitar
- Robert Banks – piano
- Leonard Gaskin – bass
- Junior Blackmon – drums

=== Production ===
- Ozzie Cadena – supervision
- Rudy Van Gelder – engineer
