= Magic Touch (Magic Sam and Shakey Jake album) =

Live album by Magic Sam
- Released: 1983
- Venue: Silvio's, Chicago
- Genre: Blues
- Length: 50:58
- Label: Black Magic

Magic Sam chronology
Magic Sam Live (1981)	Magic Touch (1983)	The Magic Sam Legacy (1989)

Magic Touch is a live album by the Chicago blues guitarist Magic Sam, accompanied by the harmonica player Shakey Jake. The set list only included one Magic Sam original, "All Your Love", his signature tune first recorded for Cobra Records in 1957. Four feature Shakey Jake on vocal and/or harmonica, including his composition "Sawed Off Shotgun". Several of the songs are contemporary 1965–1966 R&B blues-style songs popularized by Junior Parker, Little Joe Blue, Jimmy Robins, and Jimmy McCracklin performed in Magic Sam's distinctive style.

The low-fidelity recording was made by George Adins, a Belgian blues and amateur field recording enthusiast. The Dutch Black Magic label released the original album in 1983 and indicated that the performance was recorded in 1968 at Silvio's, a club in Chicago. The 1993 Black Top Records CD reissue notes that it was recorded in December 1966.

== Critical reception ==
Professional ratings
Review scores
Source	Rating
AllMusic	4/5 stars

In a review for AllMusic, blues historian Bill Dahl commented:

Another rare glimpse at Magic Sam hard at work, this time at another fabled West side haunt ... Sam launches into another terrific set of numbers that for the most part he never recorded in the studio – songs by Freddy King, Albert Collins, James Robins, Junior Parker, and Jimmy McCracklin that briliiantly suited his soaring pipes and singular guitar style.

== Track listing ==
Side one
No.	Title	Writer(s)	Vocals	Length
1.	"Juke"	Walter Jacobs a.k.a. Little Walter	Harmonica instrumental	3:05
2.	"Hate to See You Go"	Aaron Walker a.k.a. T-Bone Walker (Note: "Hate to See You Go" shares many lyrics with "Reconsider Baby" by Lowell Fulson.)	Magic Sam	3:45
3.	"Just Like a Fish"	Pearl Woods (Note: Junior Parker recorded "Just Like a Fish" in 1966.)	Magic Sam	2:50
4.	"Dirty Work Goin' On"	Ferdinand Washington (Note: "Dirty Work Going On" was recorded in 1966 by Little Joe Blue.)	Magic Sam	4:32
5.	"Rock Me"	McKinley Morgenfield a.k.a. Muddy Waters	Shakey Jake	4:38
6.	"I've Been Down So Long"	J. B. Lenoir	Magic Sam	2:35
7.	"I Just Can't Please You"	Unknown (Note: Jimmy Robins recorded "I Just Can't Please You" in 1966, who is also listed as the songwriter.)	Magic Sam	3:30

Side two
No.	Title	Writer(s)	Vocals	Length
1.	"I Just Got to Know"	Jimmy McCracklin	Magic Sam	3:35
2.	"Tore Down"	Sonny Thompson	Magic Sam	3:20
3.	"Scratch My Back"	James Moore a.k.a. Slim Harpo	Shakey Jake	4:10
4.	"Sawed Off Shotgun"	Jake Harris a.k.a. Shakey Jake	Shakey Jake	2:40
5.	"Back Stroke"	Albert Collins	Guitar instrumental	2:28
6.	"All Your Love"	Sam Maghett a.k.a. Magic Sam	Magic Sam	4:25
7.	"19 Years Old"	Morgenfield	Shakey Jake	5:25

== Personnel ==
- Magic Sam − guitar, vocals
- Shakey Jake – harmonica, vocals on side 1 tracks 1, 5 and side 2 tracks 3, 4, 7
- Mack Thompson – bass
- Odie Payne – drums
