= Kant Sheck Dees Bluze =

Studio album by Jimmy Dawkins
- Released: 1992
- Genre: Blues, Chicago blues
- Label: Earwig
- Producer: Jimmy Dawkins, Michael Frank

Jimmy Dawkins chronology
Chicago on My Mind: Living the Blues (1991)	Kant Sheck Dees Bluze (1992)	Blues and Pain (1994)

Kant Sheck Dees Bluze is an album by the American musician Jimmy Dawkins, released in 1992. It was his first studio album for an American record label in a decade. He supported it with a North American tour.

== Production ==
Kant Sheck Dees Bluze was recorded in a single day. It was produced by Dawkins and Michael Frank. Professor Eddie Lusk played piano on the album. "Wes Cide Bluze" is a tribute to Dawkins's old neighborhood. "Made the Hard Way" is an autobiographical song. Nora Jean Wallace sang on two of the album's tracks.

== Critical reception ==
Professional ratings
Review scores
Source	Rating
AllMusic	4/5 stars
Chicago Tribune	3/4 stars
DownBeat	4/5 stars
The Grove Press Guide to the Blues on CD	3.5/5 stars
MusicHound Blues: The Essential Album Guide	4.5/5 stars
The Penguin Guide to Blues Recordings	3/4 stars
Pittsburgh Post-Gazette	3/4 stars
The Press of Atlantic City	3.5/4 stars
The Virgin Encyclopedia of the Blues	3/5 stars

The Chicago Tribune said that the album "should go a long way toward restoring Dawkins to contemporary prominence." The Washington Post wrote that "it's the combination of his ripsaw, reverb-heavy tone and his deft phrasing that really stands out, allowing even routine shuffles to transcend the ordinary." The Chicago Sun-Times stated that it "shows off the guitarist's talented left hand and draws on his storytelling ability as well." The Philadelphia Inquirer determined that "the blistering, dramatic leads ... attest to his speed, and his power and feeling as well." The Press of Atlantic City compared Dawkins to Freddie King and Peter Green; the paper later listed Kant Sheck Dees Bluze as one of the best blues albums of 1992.

The Grove Press Guide to the Blues on CD praised the "dirty, distorted lead guitar and a program of intense originals with a crackling contemporary edge." AllMusic determined that the "dirty, distorted tone won't thrill the purists."

== Track listing ==
No.	Title	Length
1.	"I Ain't Got It"
2.	"Rockin D. Blues"
3.	"Made the Hard Way"
4.	"A Love Like That"
5.	"Kant Sheck Dees Bluze"
6.	"Gittar Rap"
7.	"Too Bad Baby"
8.	"My Man Loves Me"
9.	"Get on the Ball"
10.	"Wes Cide Bluze"
11.	"Beetin Knockin Ringin"
12.	"Luv Somebody"
13.	"Gotta Hold On"
