= Good Times (Shakey Jake album) =

Studio album by Shakey Jake
- Released: 1960
- Recorded: May 11, 1960
- Studio: Van Gelder Studio, Englewood Cliffs, NJ
- Genre: Blues
- Length: 36:40
- Label: Bluesville; BVLP 1008
- Producer: Esmond Edwards

Shakey Jake chronology
Good Times (1960)	Mouth Harp Blues (1961)

Good Times is an album by blues musician Shakey Jake Harris recorded in 1960 and released on the Bluesville label.

== Reception ==
Professional ratings
Review scores
Source	Rating
AllMusic	3/5 stars

AllMusic reviewer Bill Dahl stated: "The trio located some succulent common ground even without a drummer, Harris keeping his mouth organ phrasing succinct and laying out when his more accomplished session mates catch fire".

== Track listing ==
All compositions by Jimmy D. Harris (Shakey Jake)

1. "Worried Blues" – 2:21
2. "My Foolish Heart" – 3:02
3. "Sunset Blues" – 6:18
4. "You Spoiled Your Baby" – 2:48
5. "Tear Drops" – 3:22
6. "Just Shakey" – 1:55
7. "Jake's Blues" – 1:51
8. "Still Your Fool" – 3:12
9. "Keep A-Loving Me Baby" – 2:09
10. "Call Me When You Need Me" – 3:28
11. "Huffin' and Puffin'" – 2:50
12. "Good Times" – 3:16

== Personnel ==
=== Performance ===
- Shakey Jake – harmonica, vocals
- Jack McDuff – organ
- Bill Jennings – guitar

=== Production ===
- Esmond Edwards – supervision
- Rudy Van Gelder – engineer
