= Harmonica Hinds =

Trinidadian-American musician

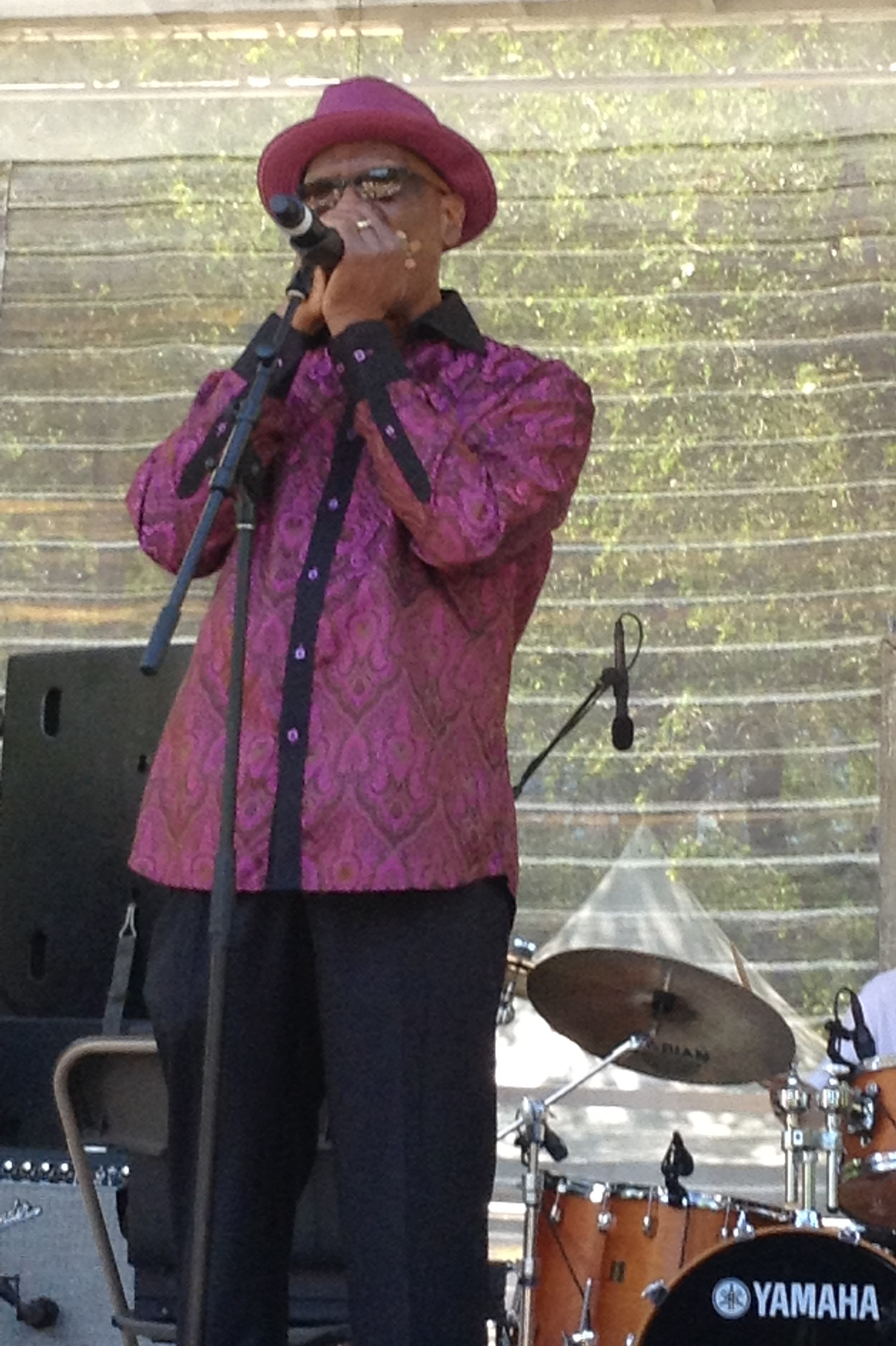
- Hinds performing at the 2014 Chicago Blues Festival

Background information
- Birth name: Mervyn H.G. Hinds
- Born: January 4, 1945 (age 80); Trinidad
- Genres: Blues
- Occupation(s): Musician, social worker
- Instrument(s): Harmonica, guitar
- Years active: 1960–present
- Labels: CD Baby, Wolf Records International

Harmonica Hinds (born Mervyn H.G. Hinds, January 4, 1945) is a Trinidadian-American blues singer and musician. He moved from Trinidad to Canada and then settled permanently in Chicago. He was influenced by blues musicians and started playing harmonica at an early age. He became known in the 1970s, when he played on the house band of Theresa's Lounge in Chicago. He shared the stage with and played on albums by many blues musicians for more than five decades, making his first recording in 2008. Further recordings were made in 2010 and 2012. He has been described as one of the most talented Chicago blues musicians and remains active on the Chicago blues scene.

== Life and career ==
Hinds, born in Trinidad, moved from his birthplace to Ottawa, Ontario, Canada, and then to Toronto. He moved to Chicago in 1977 and then to New Orleans from 1976 to 1983, and then permanently back to Chicago. Hinds was first captivated with blues harmonica while in Canada when he saw Sonny Terry play. He started playing the harmonica between the age of seven and nine. He started singing the blues in 1968. He received his first music lesson on the street from Lafayette Leake while living in Toronto. When he was studying sociology at Carleton University in Ottawa, James Cotton invited him to Chicago. He was also encouraged by New Orleans musicians David Lastie and George Porter.

Hinds became known in the 1970s when he played in the house band of the famed Theresa's Lounge in Chicago, often sharing the stage with Junior Wells. He played on the album Muddy Waters: The Hoochie Coochie Man, produced in 1984. He has played on albums for many other blues artists, including Koko Taylor, Eddie Taylor, and Mud Morganfield, and has appeared on stage with many blues musicians, including Pinetop Perkins, Willie "Big Eyes" Smith, Louisiana Red, Willie Dixon, Magic Slim and Willie Kent.

Hinds has worked as a blues musician for more than five decades. He remains active on the Chicago blues scene with his own shows and often performed with Eddie Taylor Jr. He continues to play a regular gig at Buddy Guy's Legends. He performed at the 14th, 15th, 20th, 24th, 29th, 30th and 31st Chicago Blues Festival.

== Music and performance style ==
Living Blues reviewer Jim DeKoster described Hinds's first album, Finall (self-produced under CD Baby), as "one of the most enjoyable albums in the classic Chicago blues style to come down the pike lately". Blues Revue critic James Porter, reviewing Finally, wrote that Hinds is "one of the most talented musicians on today's Chicago scene." Critic Matthew Warnock, in a review of Hinds's album Anything if I Could, wrote that Hinds and his band understood the "key emotion that makes the blues the legendary music that it is" and played with "emotional intent behind each note."

== Discography ==
- Finally (CD Baby/Joyride, 2008)
- From the Country to the City, with Eddie Taylor Jr. (Tre - Wolf Records International, 2009)
- I Would Give You Anything If I Could (CD Baby, Wolf Records International, 2010, 2014)
- If Speed Was Just a Thought (2012)
