= St. George Records =

St. George Records is an American blues and rockabilly independent record label, set up in 1983 by George Paulus.

The label first started reissuing early post-war blues recordings by artists such as Little Walter, Jimmy Rogers, Johnny Young, Sleepy John Estes. Since the 1990s they specialise in recording contemporary blues and rockabilly musicians as diverse as the Pretty Things-Yardbird Blues Band, The El Dorados, Robert "Big Mojo" Elem, Little Mack Simmons, Tail Dragger Jones, Rev. Charlie Jackson, Andre Williams, Warren Storm, Sonny Burgess, Charles Hayes and Hayden Thompson.

== See also ==
- List of record labels
