= The Return of Roosevelt Sykes =

Studio album by Roosevelt Sykes
- Released: 1960
- Recorded: March 1 and 2, 1960
- Studio: Van Gelder Studio, Englewood Cliffs, NJ
- Genre: Blues
- Length: 36:18
- Label: Bluesville; BVLP 1006
- Producer: Esmond Edwards

Roosevelt Sykes chronology
The Return of Roosevelt Sykes (1960)	The Honeydripper (1961)

The Return of Roosevelt Sykes is an album by blues musician Roosevelt Sykes recorded in 1960 and released on the Bluesville label.

== Reception ==
Professional ratings
Review scores
Source	Rating
AllMusic	4/5 stars
The Penguin Guide to Blues Recordings	1/4 stars

AllMusic reviewer Bill Dahl stated: "Sykes's lyrical images are as vivid and amusing as ever on this 1960 set, with titles like "Set the Meat Outdoors" and "Hangover" among its standouts. Other than drummer Jump Jackson, the quartet behind the pianist is pretty obscure, but they rock his boogies with a vengeance". The Penguin Guide to Blues Recordings considers the sound balance of the recording to be poor, favouring the guitar and, especially, the bass over Sykes’s piano, and says that Sykes does not sing as well as he usually did.

== Track listing ==
All compositions by Roosevelt Sykes except where noted

1. "Drivin' Wheel" – 2:25
2. "Long, Lonesome Night" – 4:15
3. "Set the Meat Outdoors" – 2:04
4. "Coming Home" – 3:50
5. "Stompin' the Boogie" – 2:47
6. "Number Nine" – 2:27
7. "Calcutta" – 3:15
8. "Selfish Woman" (Esmond Edwards) – 2:49
9. "Hangover" – 3:20
10. "Night Time Is the Right Time" (James Burke Oden) – 2:38
11. "Runnin' the Boogie" – 2:31
12. "Hey Big Momma" (Armand "Jump" Jackson) – 4:24

== Personnel ==
=== Performance ===
- Roosevelt Sykes – piano, vocals
- Clarence Perry Jr. – tenor saxophone
- Floyd Ball, Frank Ingalls – guitar, bass guitar
- Armand "Jump" Jackson – drums

=== Production ===
- Esmond Edwards – supervision
- Rudy Van Gelder – engineer
