= The Honeydripper (Roosevelt Sykes album) =

Studio album by Roosevelt Sykes
- Released: 1961
- Recorded: September 14, 1960
- Studio: Van Gelder Studio, Englewood Cliffs, NJ
- Genre: Blues
- Length: 36:18
- Label: Bluesville; BVLP 1014
- Producer: Esmond Edwards

Roosevelt Sykes chronology
The Return of Roosevelt Sykes (1960)	The Honeydripper (1961)	Blues (1961)

The Honeydripper is an album by blues musician Roosevelt Sykes recorded in 1960 and released on the Bluesville label the following year.

== Reception ==
Professional ratings
Review scores
Source	Rating
AllMusic	4/5 stars
The Penguin Guide to Blues Recordings	2/4 stars

AllMusic reviewer Ron Wynn stated: "Roosevelt Sykes expertly fit his classic, down-home piano riffs and style into a fabric that also contained elements of soul, funk, and R&B. ... Besides Sykes' alternately bemused, ironic, and inviting vocals, there's superb tenor sax support from King Curtis, Robert Banks' tasty organ, and steady, nimble bass and drum assistance by Leonard Gaskin and drummer Belton Evans.".

== Track listing ==
All compositions by Roosevelt Sykes except where noted

1. "Miss Ida B." – 4:57
2. "Mislead Mother" – 3:14
3. "Yes, Lawd" (Ozzie Cadena) – 9:16
4. "I Hate to Be Alone" – 2:01
5. "Jailbait" – 2:25
6. "Lonely Day" – 4:26
7. "Satellite Baby" – 2:46
8. "Pocketful of Money" – 2:32
9. "She Ain't for Nobody" – 2:47

== Personnel ==
=== Performance ===
- Roosevelt Sykes – piano, vocals
- King Curtis – tenor saxophone
- Robert Banks – organ
- Leonard Gaskin – bass
- Belton Evans – drums

=== Production ===
- Esmond Edwards – supervision
- Rudy Van Gelder – engineer
