= One Dozen Berrys =

Studio album by Chuck Berry
- Released: March 1958
- Recorded: May 6 or 15, December 29–30, 1957, Chicago, Illinois
- Studio: Sheldon, Chicago, Illinois
- Genre: Rock and roll
- Length: 34:32
- Label: Chess
- Producer: Leonard Chess, Phil Chess

Chuck Berry chronology
After School Session (1957)	One Dozen Berrys (1958)	Berry Is on Top (1959)

Singles from One Dozen Berrys
- 1. "Oh Baby Doll" Released: June 1957; 2. "Rock and Roll Music" Released: September 1957; 3. "Sweet Little Sixteen" Released: January 1958

Professional ratings
Review scores
Source	Rating
AllMusic	4.5/5 stars
The Encyclopedia of Popular Music	5/5 stars

One Dozen Berrys is the second studio album by Chuck Berry, released in March 1958 on Chess Records. With the exception of five new songs, "Rockin' at the Philharmonic", "Guitar Boogie", "In-Go", "How You've Changed", and "It Don't Take but a Few Minutes", and one alternate take, "Low Feeling", all tracks had been previously released on 45 rpm singles. It was also released in the United Kingdom. In 2012, Hoodoo reissued the album with Berry Is on Top on the same CD. Sheldon Recording Studio, where all of the recordings were made, was located at 2120 South Michigan Ave. in Chicago and eventually became Chess Studios.

== Track listing ==
All tracks written by Chuck Berry.

=== Side one ===
1. "Sweet Little Sixteen" – 3:03
2. "Blue Feeling" - Instrumental – 3:04
3. "La Juanda (Espanola)" – 3:14
4. "Rockin' at the Philharmonic" - Instrumental – 3:23
5. "Oh Baby Doll" – 2:37
6. "Guitar Boogie" - Instrumental – 2:21

=== Side two ===
1. "Reelin' and Rockin'" – 3:18
2. "Ingo" - Instrumental – 2:29
3. "Rock and Roll Music" – 2:34
4. "How You've Changed" – 2:49
5. "Low Feeling" – 3:09 same recording as "Blue Feeling", but with the tape playback slowed
6. "It Don't Take but a Few Minutes" – 2:31

== Personnel ==
- Chuck Berry – vocals, guitars
- Hubert Sumlin – electric guitar
- Johnnie Johnson, Lafayette Leake – piano
- Willie Dixon – bass
- Fred Below, Ebbie Hardy – drums
