= Midnight Special (Al Smith album) =

Studio album by Al Smith
- Released: 1961
- Recorded: August 11, 1960
- Studios: Van Gelder Studio, Englewood Cliffs, New Jersey, U.S.
- Genre: Jazz
- Length: 32:05
- Labels: Bluesville; BVLP 1013
- Producer: Ozzie Cadena

Al Smith chronology
Hear My Blues (1960)	Midnight Special (1961)

Midnight Special is the second album by the jazz/blues vocalist Al Smith, featuring saxophonist King Curtis, which was recorded in 1960 and released on the Bluesville label early the following year.

== Reception ==
Professional ratings
Review scores
Source	Rating
AllMusic	4/5 stars

AllMusic reviewer Alex Henderson stated: "Midnight Special finds Smith backed by a rock-solid quintet ... Smith has a big, full, rich voice, and he uses it to maximum advantage throughout this excellent album ... With the right exposure, Smith might have become a major name in 1960s blues and R&B – he certainly had the chops and the talent. But, unfortunately, he never enjoyed the commercial success that he was most deserving of. Nonetheless, Midnight Special is an album to savor if you're the type of listener who holds classic soul and the blues in equally high regard".

== Track listing ==
All compositions by Al Smith except where noted

1. "I've Been Mistreated" (Eddie Boyd) – 6:56
2. "You're a Sweetheart" (Jimmy McHugh, Harold Adamson) – 4:31
3. "Baby Don't Worry 'Bout Me" – 3:31
4. "Ride on Midnight Special" – 2:33
5. "The Bells" (Joe Hicks) – 4:08
6. "Goin' to Alabama" – 3:19
7. "I'll Never Let You Go" (Jimmy Wakely) – 3:37
8. "I Can't Make It by Myself" – 3:30

== Personnel ==
- Al Smith – vocals
- King Curtis – tenor saxophone
- Jimmy Lee – guitar
- Robert Banks – organ
- Leonard Gaskin – bass
- Bobby Donaldson – drums
