= Love Me Mama =

Studio album by Luther Allison and the Blue Nebulae
- Released: 1969
- Recorded: June 24 and 25, 1969
- Studios: Sound Studios, Chicago
- Genre: Blues
- Length: 59:41
- Labels: Delmark; DS-625
- Producer: Robert G. Koester

Luther Allison chronology
Love Me Mama (1969)	Bad News Is Coming (1973)

Love Me Mama is the debut album by the American blues musician Luther Allison recorded in Chicago in 1969 and released by the Delmark label.

== Reception ==
Professional ratings
Review scores
Source	Rating
Allmusic	3.5/5 stars
The Penguin Guide to Blues Recordings	2.5/4 stars

Allmusic reviewer Thom Owens stated "Although it has its moments -- particularly on the title track -- Luther Allison's debut album, Love Me Mama, is on the whole uneven, featuring more mediocre tracks than killer cuts. Nevertheless, it offers intriguing glimpses of the style he would later develop".

== Track listing ==
All compositions by Luther Allison except where noted

1. "Why I Love the Blues" − 4:06
2. "Little Red Rooster" (Willie Dixon) − 4:31
3. "4:00 in the Morning" (B.B. King, Ferdinand Washington) − 2:16
4. "You Done Lost Your Good Thing Now" [alternate take] (King, Jo Josea) − 4:18 Additional track on CD reissue
5. "Five Long Years" (Eddie Boyd) − 4:19
6. "Dust My Broom" (Robert Johnson) − 3:35
7. "Every Night About This Time" (Fats Domino) − 4:01 Additional track on CD reissue
8. "Love Me Mama"− 3:58
9. "The Sky Is Crying" (Elmore James) − 5:38
10. "You Gotta Help Me" (Sonny Boy Williamson II, Ralph Bass, Dixon) − 3:51
11. "You Done Lost You Good Thing Now" (King, Josea) − 3:36
12. "Bloomington Closer" − 7:23
13. "Little Red Rooster" [alternate take] (Dixon) − 5:21 Additional track on CD reissue
14. "Walking from Door to Door" − 3:45 Additional track on CD reissue

== Personnel ==
- Luther Allison − guitar, vocals
- Robert "Big Mojo" Elem − bass
- Jim Conley − tenor saxophone (tracks 2, 6, 13 & 14)
- Jimmy "Fast Fingers" Dawkins − guitar (tracks 2, 6, 8, 9, 13 & 14)
- Bob Richey (2, 3, 6, 8, 9, 13 & 14), Bobby Davis (tracks 1, 4, 5, 7 & 10–12) – drums
