= Studebaker John =

American guitarist and harmonica player

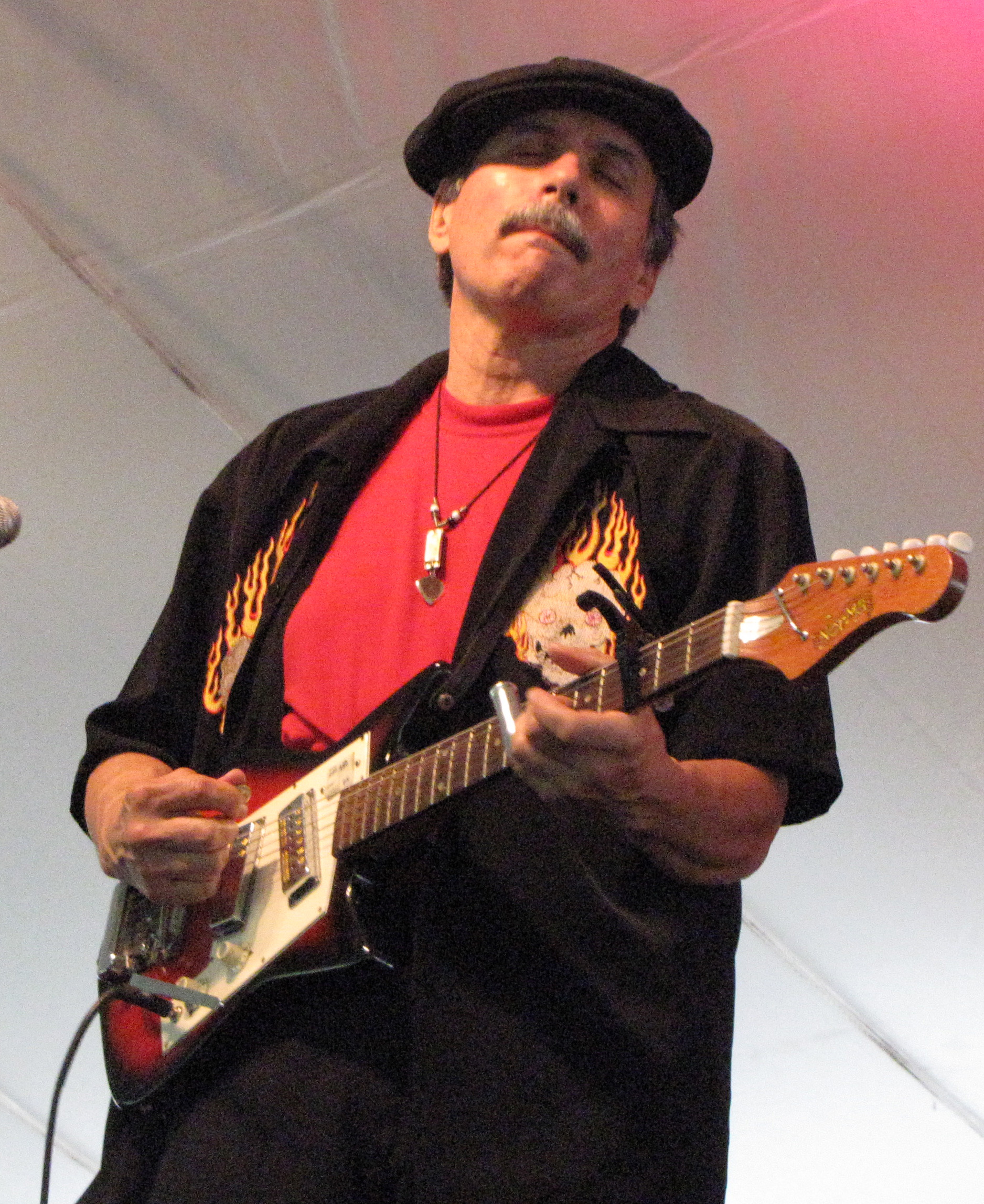
- Studebaker John performing in August 2010

Background information
- Born: John Grimaldi; November 5, 1952 (age 73); Chicago, Illinois, United States
- Genre: Chicago blues
- Occupations: Guitarist, harmonica player, singer, songwriter
- Instruments: Guitar, harmonica
- Years active: 1970s–present
- Labels: Retread Records, Avanti, Double Trouble, Blind Pig, Evidence, Delmark

John Grimaldi (born November 5, 1952), better known by his stage name Studebaker John is an American blues guitarist and harmonica player. He is a practitioner of the Chicago blues style, with his stage name arising from an automobile he once owned.

== Biography ==
He was born in Chicago, Illinois, United States. Studebaker John's father was an amateur musician, and he played early in life at the Maxwell Street flea market. Grimaldi began playing harmonica at age seven. In the 1970s he put together his band, the Hawks, and worked as a construction worker while recording and performing on the side. He recorded extensively for Blind Pig Records in the 1990s. Grimaldi counts Hound Dog Taylor as the reason he began playing slide guitar. Atom Egoyan chose three of John's songs for his 1993 film Calendar, and included two songs in his 1994 film Exotica. In 1995, John played on Little Mack Simmons', High & Lonesome album.

== Discography ==
- Straight No Chaser (Retread Records RRLP-0003, 1979)
- Rockin' The Blues '85 (Avanti Records 603071, 1985; CD reissue: Double Trouble 3031, 1992)
- Nothin' But Fun (Double Trouble 3025, 1990)
- Born To Win (Double Trouble 3027, 1991)
- Too Tough (Blind Pig 5010, 1994)
- Outside Lookin' In (Blind Pig 5022, 1995)
- Tremoluxe (Blind Pig 5031, 1996)
- Time Will Tell (Blind Pig 5042, 1997)
- Promise Of Love (Avanti [UPC: 800492185656], 2000)
- Howl With The Wolf (Evidence 26112, 2001)
- Between Life & Death (Avanti [UPC: 620673230827], 2004)
- Self-Made Man (Avanti [UPC: 800492176456], 2006)
- Waiting On The Sun (Avanti [UPC: 800492193583], 2008)
- That's The Way You Do (Delmark 810, 2010) with the Maxwell Street Kings
- Old School Rockin' (Delmark 818, 2012)
- Kingsville Jukin' (Delmark 830, 2013) with the Maxwell Street Kings
- Eternity's Descent (Avanti [UPC: 692193999515], 2015; reissue: Pepper Cake/ZYX Music [UPC: 090204527397], 2018)
- Songs For None (Red White 'n' Blues/Avanti [UPC: 8712618203323], 2018)
- The Resonator (Pepper Cake/ZYX Music [UPC: 194111014961], 2022)
