= Eddie Shaw =

American blues saxophonist and bandleader (1937–2018)

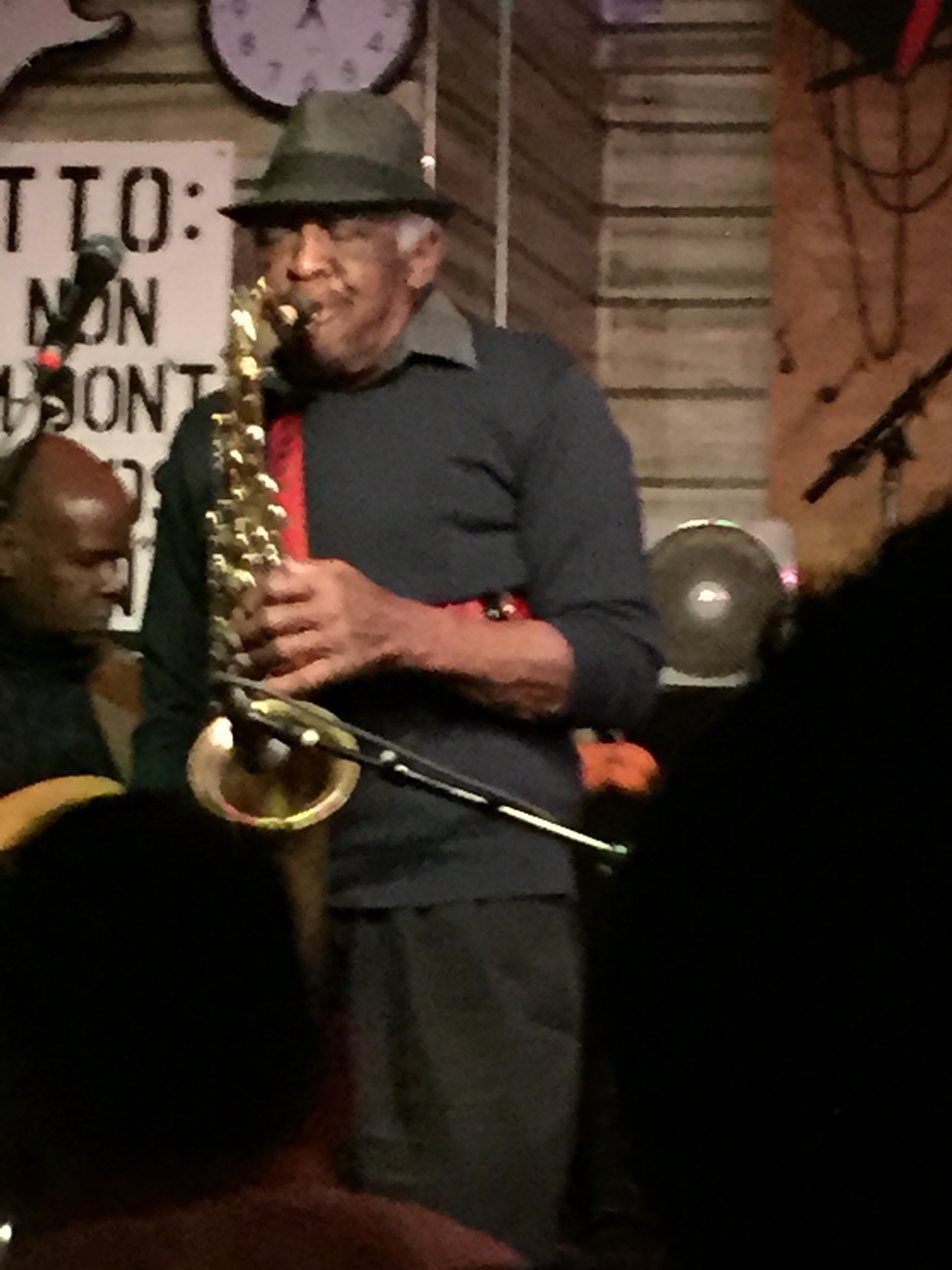

Background information
- Born: March 20, 1937; Stringtown, Mississippi, United States
- Died: January 29, 2018 (aged 80) Chicago, Illinois, United States
- Genres: Chicago blues
- Occupation(s): Saxophonist, songwriter
- Instrument: Tenor saxophone
- Years active: Early 1950s – 2018
- Labels: Various

Eddie Shaw (March 20, 1937 – January 29, 2018) was an American Chicago blues tenor saxophonist, arranger and bandleader. He led Howlin' Wolf's band, the Wolf Gang, from 1972, both before Wolf's death in 1976 and subsequently.

== Biography ==
Shaw was born in Stringtown, Mississippi. In his teenage years, Shaw played tenor saxophone with local blues musicians, such as Little Milton and Willie Love. At the age of 14, he played in a jam session in Greenville, Mississippi, with Ike Turner's band. At a gig in Itta Bena, Mississippi, when the then 20-year-old Shaw performed, Muddy Waters invited him to join his Chicago-based band.

In Waters's band, Shaw divided the tenor saxophone position with A.C. Reed. In 1972 he joined Howlin' Wolf, leading his band, the Wolf Gang, and writing half the songs on The Back Door Wolf (1973). After the singer's death in 1976 he took over the band and its residency at the 1815 Club, renamed Eddie's Place. Shaw led the band on Living Chicago Blues Vol. 1 and Have Blues – Will Travel (1980) and recorded albums with different backing for Isabel Records, Rooster Blues, and Wolf Records.

Shaw's own recording career started in the late 1970s, with an appearance on the Alligator Records anthology Living Chicago Blues (1978) and his own LPs for Evidence and Rooster Blues, and more recent discs for Rooster Blues (In the Land of the Crossroads) and Wolf (Home Alone).

Shaw's many contributions to the blues included arranging tracks for The London Howlin' Wolf Sessions (which featured Eric Clapton, Bill Wyman, Ringo Starr and others) and performing with blues notables, including Hound Dog Taylor, Freddie King, Otis Rush and Magic Sam (on his Black Magic album).

One of his sons, Eddie "Vaan" Shaw Jr. (born November 6, 1955), joined the Wolf Gang and played on some of his father's recordings, using a unique three-neck Fender guitar. A disciple of Wolf's protégé Hubert Sumlin, he has recorded two albums of his own – Morning Rain and The Trail of Tears. Another son, Stan Shaw (born 1952), is a character actor based in Hollywood, California.

Shaw appeared in the 2007 film Honeydripper.

Shaw died in January 2018 in Chicago of natural causes, aged 80.

== Accolades ==
In 2011, Shaw was honored with a marker on the Mississippi Blues Trail in Benoit, Mississippi.

In 2013 and 2014, Shaw won the Blues Music Award in the category Instrumentalist – Horn.

May 3 became Eddie Shaw Day in Chicago, by proclamation of Mayor Rahm Emanuel in 2014.

In 2014, Shaw was inducted into the Blues Hall of Fame.

== Discography ==
- 1982: Movin' and Groovin' Man (Evidence)
- 1986: King of the Road (Rooster Blues)
- 1992: In the Land of the Crossroads (Rooster Blues)
- 1995: Home Alone (Wolf)
- 1996: The Blues Is Nothing but Good News! (Wolf)
- 1997: Can't Stop Now (Delmark)
- 1999: Too Many Highways, recorded 1996 (Wolf)
- 2005: Give Me Time (Wolf)
- 2012: Still Riding High, as Eddie Shaw and the 757 Allstars (Stringtown)

With Howlin' Wolf

- The Real Folk Blues (Chess, 1956-64 [1965])
- Live and Cookin' (Chess, 1972)
- The Back Door Wolf (Chess, 1973)

With Magic Sam

- Magic Sam Live (Delmark, 1963/64 [1981])
- The Magic Sam Legacy (Delmark, 1967/68 [1989])
- Rockin' Wild in Chicago (Delmark, 1963/64 [2002])

== See also ==
- List of Chicago blues musicians
