= West Side Soul =

Studio album by Magic Sam Blues Band
- Released: April 1968 (Note: Billboard identified the album as a new release in September 1968, but an article in the Chicago Tribune that May indicated the album was already on sale. Jim Irvin dates its release to April 1968.)
- Recorded: July 12 & October 25, 1967
- Studio: Sound Studios, Chicago
- Genre: Chicago blues
- Length: 44:26
- Label: Delmark
- Producer: Robert G. Koester

Magic Sam chronology
West Side Soul (1968)	Black Magic (1969)

West Side Soul is the debut studio album by Chicago blues musician Magic Sam. Released by Delmark Records in 1968, it is often cited as one of the key modern electric blues albums. The album includes a re-recording of Magic Sam's first Cobra Records single, "All Your Love" (1957), and an updated "Sweet Home Chicago", which became a popular blues anthem.

== Critical reception ==
Professional ratings
Review scores
Source	Rating
AllMusic	5/5 stars
DownBeat	5/5 stars
The Penguin Guide to Blues Recordings	3.5/4 stars

In an album review for AllMusic, Stephen Thomas Erlewine gave the album five out of five stars and commented:

this isn't an album that should be preserved in amber, seen only as an important record. Because this is a record that is exploding with life, a record with so much energy, it doesn't sound old. Of course, part of the reason it sounds so modern is because this is the template for most modern blues, whether it comes from Chicago or elsewhere.

In 1984, West Side Soul was inducted into the Blues Hall of Fame as a classic of blues recording. Blues historian Jim O'Neal wrote in the induction statement:

Magic Sam's soaring vocals and sparkling guitar work enliven the remake of his own Cobra classic "All Your Love," propulsive boogies, and covers of nuggets from Little Milton, Otis Rush, J.B. Lenoir, and others. Sam's "Sweet Home Chicago" is one of the best versions ever recorded, long before the song became the overdone sing-along theme of every Windy City blues band.

== Track listing ==
Side A
No.	Title	Writer(s)	Length
1.	"That's All I Need"	Samuel Maghett	3:40
2.	"I Need You So Bad"	B.B. King; Saul Bihari	4:51
3.	"I Feel So Good (I Wanna Boogie)"	Junior Parker	4:36
4.	"All of Your Love"	Maghett	3:43
5.	"I Don't Want No Woman"	Don Robey	3:38

Side B
No.	Title	Writer(s)	Length
1.	"Sweet Home Chicago"	Robert Johnson	4:11
2.	"I Found a New Love"	Little Milton	4:03
3.	"Every Night and Every Day"	Jimmy McCracklin	2:19
4.	"Lookin' Good [instrumental]"	Maghett	3:11
5.	"My Love Will Never Die"	Willie Dixon	4:04
6.	"Mama Talk to Your Daughter"	J.B. Lenoir	2:40

== Personnel ==
Musicians

- Magic Sam – vocals, guitar
- Mighty Joe Young – guitar
- Stockholm Slim – piano
- Earnest Johnson – bass, except tracks 1, 3, 8
- Odie Payne – drums, except tracks 1, 3, 8
- Mac Thompson – bass on tracks 1, 3, 8
- Odie Payne, III – drums on tracks 1, 3, 8

Production

- Recorded – July 12 and October 25, 1967
- Album production and supervision – Robert G. Koester
- Recording – Stu Black, Sound Studios

== Sources ==
- Irvin, Jim (2009). The Mojo Collection (4th ed.). Edinburgh: Canongate Books. ISBN 978-1-84767-643-6 – via Google Books.
