= Black Magic (Magic Sam album) =

Studio album by Magic Sam Blues Band
- Released: November 1969
- Recorded: October 23 & November 6, 1968
- Genre: Blues
- Length: 39:04
- Label: Delmark
- Producer: Robert G. Koester

Magic Sam chronology
West Side Soul (1968)	Black Magic (1969)	Magic Sam Live (1981)

Black Magic is a studio album by Chicago blues musician Magic Sam. Delmark Records released it under the name of "Magic Sam Blues Band", in November 1969, shortly before his death. The album was a follow-up to Magic Sam's highly influential studio debut, West Side Soul (1968), and also includes a mix of originals with songs written by his contemporaries.

== Critical reception ==
Professional ratings
Review scores
Source	Rating
AllMusic	4.5/5 stars
The Penguin Guide to Blues Recordings	3/4 stars

Bill Dahl, in a retrospective review for AllMusic, gave the album four and a half stars out of five. He called it "another instant classic" and noted some R&B-style influenced songs.

Blues historian Gerard Herzhaft commented that the album, along with West Side Soul, "brought unanimous praise from the critics. Today [1996], they are considered classics of the Chicago blues".

In 1990, Black Magic was inducted into the Blues Hall of Fame as a classic of blues recording. The induction statement includes:

Black Magic follows in the same vein as Magic Sam's first Delmark LP (and first Hall of Fame album), West Side Soul, combining burning West Side blues with heartfelt touches of soul. Again, most of the songs are covers (Little Milton, Otis Rush, Lowell Fulson, Freddie King, et al, with the more obscure Andrew Brown cut "Stop! You're Hurting Me" a definite highlight) and there a couple remakes of Sam's 45s, but again, it all sounds vital and up-to-the-minute.

== Track listing ==
Side A

1. "I Just Want a Little Bit" – 3:03
2. "What Have I Done Wrong" – 3:10
3. "Easy, Baby" – 3:54
4. "You Belong to Me" – 4:05
5. "It's All Your Fault" – 4:50

Side B

1. "I Have the Same Old Blues" – 3:32
2. "You Don't Love Me Baby" – 3:29
3. "San-Ho-Zay" [instrumental] – 3:53
4. "Stop! You're Hurting Me" – 4:47
5. "Keep Loving Me Baby"– 3:30

== Personnel ==
- Magic Sam – vocals, guitar
- Eddie Shaw – tenor saxophone
- Lafayette Leake – piano
- Mighty Joe Young – guitar
- Mack Thompson – bass
- Odie Payne Jr. – drums
