= Rockin' Wild in Chicago =

Live album by Magic Sam
- Released: 2002
- Recorded: November 1963, February 1964, October 2, 1966 and in 1968
- Venue: The Alex Club, The Copa Cabana and Mother Blues, Chicago
- Genre: Blues
- Length: 64:36
- Label: Delmark; DG-765
- Producer: Robert G. Koester

Magic Sam chronology
With a Feeling!: The Complete Cobra, Chief and Crash Recordings 1957-1966 (2001)	Rockin' Wild in Chicago (2002)	Live at the Avant Garde (2013)

Rockin' Wild in Chicago is a live album by the American blues musician Magic Sam, compiling tracks recorded in Chicago between 1963 and 1968, that was released by the Delmark label in 2021.

== Reception ==
Professional ratings
Review scores
Source	Rating
Allmusic	1.5/5 stars
The Penguin Guide to Blues Recordings	2.5/4 stars

AllMusic reviewer Alex Henderson stated "the sound quality ranges from barely decent to genuinely bad (by '60s standards). But the performances themselves are generally excellent. Magic Sam was among the most exciting Chicago bluesmen of the '60s, and the singer/guitarist is downright explosive ... because the sound is as disappointing as it is, Rockin' Wild in Chicago isn't recommended to casual listeners ... strictly for the late bluesman's more devoted fans, who will probably want a copy despite the inferior sound." The Penguin Guide to Blues Recordings said "this is a testing experience for even the most hardcore enthusiast ... Sam is as forceful and energetic as ever ... but his vocals are frequently close to inaudible ... A set for extreme collectors and obsessives".

== Track listing ==
1. "Tremble" (instrumental) (Albert Collins) − 3:36
2. "Call Me When You Need Me" (Jimmie D. Harris) − 3:18
3. "How Long Can This Go On" (Herman Parker) − 3:37
4. "Every Night and Every Day" (Jimmy McCracklin) − 4:35
5. "Why Are You So Mean to Me" (Albert King) − 2:27
6. "Dirty Work Going On" (Ferdinand Washington) − 4:21
7. "Further On Up the Road" (Joe Veasey, Don Robey) − 2:46
8. "It's All Your Fault Baby" (Lowell Fulson) − 4:30
9. "Looking Good" (instrumental) (Sam Maghett) − 4:53
10. "Keep On Loving Me Baby" (Otis Rush) − 5:11
11. "I Found Me a New Love" (Milton Campbell, Bob Lyons) − 4:04
12. "Got My Mojo Working" (Preston Foster) − 4:04
13. "I Don't Want No Woman" (Robey) − 3:01
14. "Just a Little Bit" (Rosco Gordon) − 4:24
15. "Tore Down" (Sonny Thompson) − 3:54
16. "Rockin' Wild" (instrumental) (Earl Hooker) − 4:13
- Recorded in Chicago in November 1963 (tracks 9 & 10), and February 1964 (tracks 11 & 12) at The Alex Club; on October 2, 1966, at The Copa Cabana (tracks 1–8); and in 1968 at Mother Blues (tracks 13–16)

== Personnel ==
- Magic Sam − guitar, vocals
- Eddie Shaw – tenor saxophone, vocals (tracks 9–12)
- A.C. Reed – tenor saxophone, vocals (tracks 11 & 12)
- Tyrone Carter – electric piano (tracks 9 & 10)
- Mack Thompson – bass
- Odie Payne – drums (tracks 1–12)
- "Huckleberry Hound" (Robert Wright) – drums (tracks 13–16)
