= Jimmy Dawkins =

American blues guitarist and singer (1936–2013)

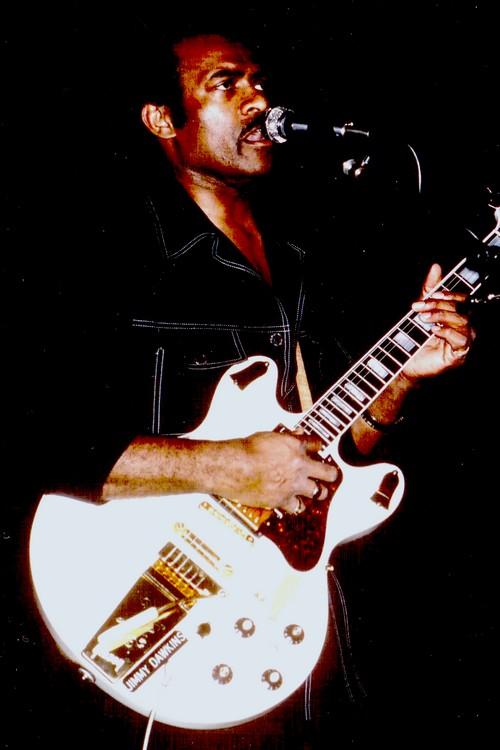
- Dawkins in March 1981

Background information
- Born: James Henry Dawkins; October 24, 1936; Tchula, Mississippi, United States
- Died: April 10, 2013 (aged 76) Chicago, Illinois, United States
- Genre: Blues
- Occupation: Musician
- Instruments: Guitar, vocals
- Years active: Late 1960s–2013
- Labels: Delmark, Storyville, Earwig Music

James Henry “Jimmy” Dawkins (October 24, 1936 – April 10, 2013) was an American Chicago blues and electric blues guitarist and singer. He is generally considered to have been a practitioner of the "West Side sound" of Chicago blues.

== Career ==
Dawkins was born in Tchula, Mississippi. He moved to Chicago in 1955, where he worked in a box factory, started to play in local blues clubs, and gained a reputation as a session musician.

In 1969, thanks to the efforts of his friend Magic Sam, his first album, Fast Fingers, was released by Delmark Records. It won the Grand Prix du Disque from the Hot Club de France. In 1971, Delmark released his second album, All for Business, with the singer Andrew Odom and the guitarist Otis Rush.

Dawkins toured in the late 1970s, backed up by James Solberg (of Luther Allison and the Nighthawks) on guitar and Jon Preizler (the Lamont Cranston Band, Luther Allison, The Drifters, and Albert King), a Seattle-based Hammond B-3 organ player. Other musicians that toured with Dawkins in the late 1970s include Jimi Schutte (drums), Sylvester Boines (bass), Rich Kirch and Billy Flynn (guitars). Dawkins toured in Europe with this group of musicians. He also toured in Japan and recorded more albums in the United States and Europe. He contributed a column to the blues magazine Living Blues.

In the 1980s he released few recordings but started his own record label, Leric Records, and was more interested in promoting other artists, including Tail Dragger Jones, Queen Sylvia Embry, Little Johnny Christian, and Nora Jean Bruso (née Wallace).

Dawkins died of undisclosed causes on April 10, 2013, aged 76.

== Discography ==
=== Solo ===
- Fast Fingers (1969), Delmark Records
- All for Business (1971), Delmark Records
- Jimmy Dawkins (1971)
- Tribute to Orange (1971)
- Transatlantic 770 (1972)
- Blisterstring (1976), Delmark Records
- Come Back Baby (1976), Storyville Records
- Hot Wire '81 (1981), with Rich Kirch, Sylvester Boines, and Jimi Schutte, recorded in Paris
- Jimmy and Hip: Live! (1982)
- Feel the Blues (1985)
- All Blues (1986)
- Chicago on My Mind: Living the Blues (1991), recording in 1971, Vogue Records
- Kant Sheck Dees Bluze (1992), Earwig Music Company
- Blues and Pain (1994)
- B Phur Real (1995)
- Me, My Guitar & the Blues (1997)
- Vol. 2: I Want to Know (1999), recorded in 1975, Storyville Records
- Born in Poverty (1999), recorded in 1972 & 1974, Black & Blue Records
- American Roots: Blues (2002), compilation 1994–1997
- West Side Guitar Hero (2002)
- Tell Me Baby (2004)

=== With other artists ===
- Jimmy Dawkins / Big Voice Odom (1975) Black & Blue
- Blues Queen Sylvia & Jimmy Dawkins: Midnight Baby (1983)
- Jimmy Dawkins / Chicago Beau / Blue Ice Bragason: Blues from Iceland (1991)
- Sunnyland Slim & Big Voice Odom: Chicago Blues Festival 1974 with Jimmy Dawkins (2005)

=== As sideman ===
With Luther Allison

- Love Me Mama (1969) Delmark

With Carey Bell

- Carey Bell's Blues Harp (1969) Delmark

With Sleepy John Estes

- Electric Sleep (1969) Delmark

With Mighty Joe Young

- Blues with a Touch of Soul (1971) Delmark,

With Otis Rush

- Otis Rush Screamin' and Cryin' (1975) Black & Blue

== Sources ==
- Sharp, Steven, March/April 1993, 'Jimmy Dawkins: Deep Into The Feelings', Living Blues, Vol. 108
