= Little Mack Simmons =

American Chicago blues musician

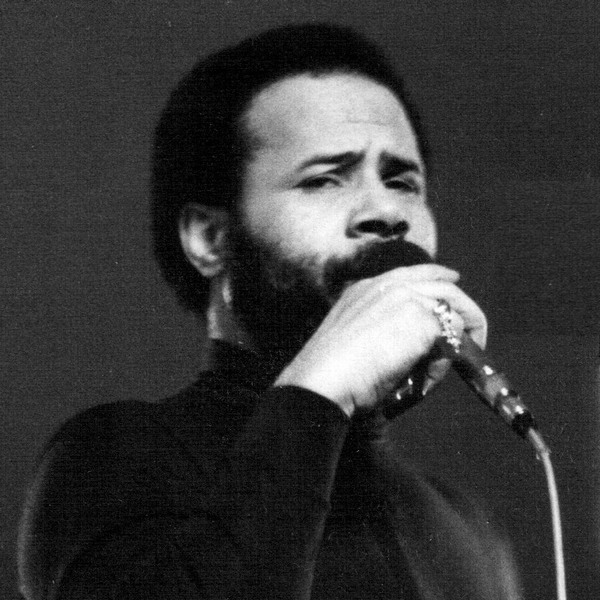
- Simmons in December 1975

Background information
- Born: Malcolm Simmons; January 25, 1933; Twist, Arkansas, U.S.
- Died: October 24, 2000 (aged 67) Chicago, Illinois, U.S.
- Genres: Chicago blues
- Occupations: Singer, songwriter, harmonicist
- Instruments: Harmonica, vocals
- Years active: Late 1950s–2000
- Labels: Black & Blue, Simmons, St. George, Wolf, Electro-Fi

Malcolm "Little Mack" Simmons (January 25, 1933 – October 24, 2000) was an American Chicago blues harmonica player, singer, and songwriter. He ran the Simmons Records label in the 1970s.

== Early life ==
Simmons was born in Twist, Arkansas. In his youth, he befriended James Cotton, and both learned to play the harmonica as they were growing up. Simmons relocated to St. Louis, Missouri, at the age of 18 and worked on the railroad. Around this time he made his stage debut with Robert Nighthawk.

== Career in Chicago ==
In 1954, he moved to Chicago, Illinois, put together his own backing band, and had a five-year residency at Cadillac Baby's. He commenced recording in 1959, issuing records on several labels, including Chess.

In the late 1950s and early 1960s Simmons recorded several more obscure singles, often simply billed as Little Mack (or Mac). He owned and managed the Zodiac Lounge, in Chicago, from the mid- to late 1960s, providing opportunities for other artists. He also owned a recording studio and recorded on his own labels, PM Records and Simmons Records. Simmons left the music industry for the ministry in the 1960s and was rarely heard for the next 30 years, notwithstanding an album he recorded in 1975 in Paris.

His returned to blues music with High & Lonesome (1995), an early success for St. George Records, an independent record label. His energetic style, accompanied by Studebaker John, belied his years. Come Back to Me Baby (1996), with featured sidemen John Primer, Willie Kent and Jake Dawson (guitarist), was also well received.

Simmons died of colon cancer on October 24, 2000, in his adopted hometown of Chicago; he was 67.

== Discography ==
=== Albums ===
- Blue Lights, 1975 (Black & Blue Records, France)
- Love Will Make a Way Somehow, 1978 (Simmons Records)
- High & Lonesome, 1995 (St. George Records)
- Come Back to Me Baby, 1996 (Wolf Records)
- Little Mack Is Back, 1997 (Electro-Fi Records)
- Somewhere On Down the Line, 1998 (Electro-Fi)
- The Last Sessions, 2001 (Blues Special Records)
- The Best of Little Mack Simmons, 2001 (Electro-Fi)

=== Singles ===
- "Come Back to Me Baby"
- "Jumpin' at Cadillac" with James Cotton
- "Times Gettin' Tougher"
- "You Mistreated Me Baby"
- "I Need Love"
- "I Play for Keeps"
- "I'm Happy Now"
- "Don't Leave Me Now"
- "When the Lord Stands By"
- "Inflation Blues"

=== Appearances ===
With Earl Hooker

- Sweet Black Angel (Blue Thumb, 1969)

== See also ==
- List of Chicago blues musicians
- List of harmonicists
- List of harmonica blues musicians
