= Shakey Jake Harris =

American Chicago blues musician (1921–1990)

- Harris c. 1960

Background information
- Born: James D. Harris; April 12, 1921; Earle, Arkansas, U.S.
- Died: March 2, 1990 (aged 68) Forrest City, Arkansas, U.S.
- Genres: Chicago blues
- Occupations: Musician; songwriter
- Instruments: Harmonica; vocals
- Years active: Late 1940s–late 1980s
- Labels: Artistic; Bluesville; World Pacific
- Relatives: Magic Sam (nephew)

James D. "Shakey Jake" Harris (April 12, 1921 – March 2, 1990) was an American Chicago blues singer, harmonicist and songwriter. He released six albums over a period of almost 25 years. He was often musically associated with his nephew Magic Sam.

== Life and career ==
James D. Harris was born in Earle, Arkansas, and relocated with his family to Chicago, Illinois, at the age of seven. He played in several Chicago blues ensembles in the late 1940s. He also worked as a mechanic and as a professional gambler (his nickname came from a dice players' expression, "shake 'em"). His debut recording was the single "Call Me if You Need Me", backed with "Roll Your Moneymaker", released by Artistic Records in 1958, featuring Magic Sam and Syl Johnson on guitar and produced by Willie Dixon. Harris was not paid for the session, but he won $700 shooting craps with label owner Eli Toscano.

In 1960, Bluesville Records teamed Harris with the jazz musicians Jack McDuff and Bill Jennings for the album Good Times. His later recording of Mouth Harp Blues returned to a more traditional blues style. Harris toured and was part of the American Folk Blues Festival tour in 1962.

Throughout the 1960s Harris and Sam appeared regularly in concert together around Chicago. Harris's patronage of younger musicians helped secure Luther Allison's recording debut. Harris moved on in the late 1960s, recording with Allison in Los Angeles on Further On up the Road. He also played with other harmonica players, such as William Clarke.

Harris subsequently recorded for World Pacific. He also owned a nightclub and a record label, but ill health eventually led him to return to Arkansas, where he died, at the age of 68, on March 2, 1990.

== Selected discography ==
=== Singles ===
- "Call Me if You Need Me" / "Roll Your Moneymaker" (1958), Artistic
- "Respect Me Baby" / "A Hard Road" (1966), The Blues

=== Albums ===
- Good Times (Bluesville, 1960)
- Mouth Harp Blues (Bluesville, 1961)
- Further on Up the Road, billed as Shakey Jake and the All Stars (World Pacific, 1969)
- The Devil's Harmonica (1972), Polydor
- Make it Good to You (Good Times Records, 1978)
- The Key Won't Fit (1984), Murray Brothers

With Magic Sam

- Magic Touch (Black Magic, 1966 [1983])
- The Magic Sam Legacy (Delmark, 1967 [1989])

== See also ==
- List of Chicago blues musicians
- List of harmonicists
