= Magic Sam =

American Chicago blues guitarist (1937–1969)

Background information
- Born: Samuel Gene Maghett; February 14, 1937; Grenada County, Mississippi, U.S.
- Died: December 1, 1969 (aged 32) Chicago
- Genre: Chicago blues
- Occupations: Musician; songwriter
- Instruments: Guitar; vocals
- Years active: 1957–1969
- Labels: Cobra; Chief; Delmark

Samuel Gene Maghett (February 14, 1937 – December 1, 1969), known as Magic Sam, was an American Chicago blues musician. He was born in Grenada County, Mississippi, and learned to play the blues from listening to records by Muddy Waters and Little Walter. After moving to Chicago at the age of 19, he was signed by Cobra Records and became well known as a bluesman after the release of his first record, "All Your Love", in 1957. He was known for his distinctive tremolo guitar playing.

The stage name Magic Sam was devised by Sam's bass player and childhood friend Mack Thompson at Sam's first recording session for Cobra, as an approximation of "Maghett Sam". The name Sam was using at the time, Good Rocking Sam, was already being used by another artist.

== Life and career ==
Maghett moved to Chicago in 1956, where his guitar playing earned him bookings at blues clubs on the West Side. He recorded singles for Cobra Records from 1957 to 1959, including "All Your Love" and "Easy Baby". They did not reach the record charts but had a profound influence, far beyond Chicago's guitarists and singers. Together with recordings by Otis Rush and Buddy Guy (also Cobra artists), the West Side Sound was a manifesto for a new kind of blues. Around this time Magic Sam worked briefly with Homesick James Williamson. Magic Sam gained a following before being drafted into the U.S. Army. He served six months in prison for desertion and received a dishonorable discharge.

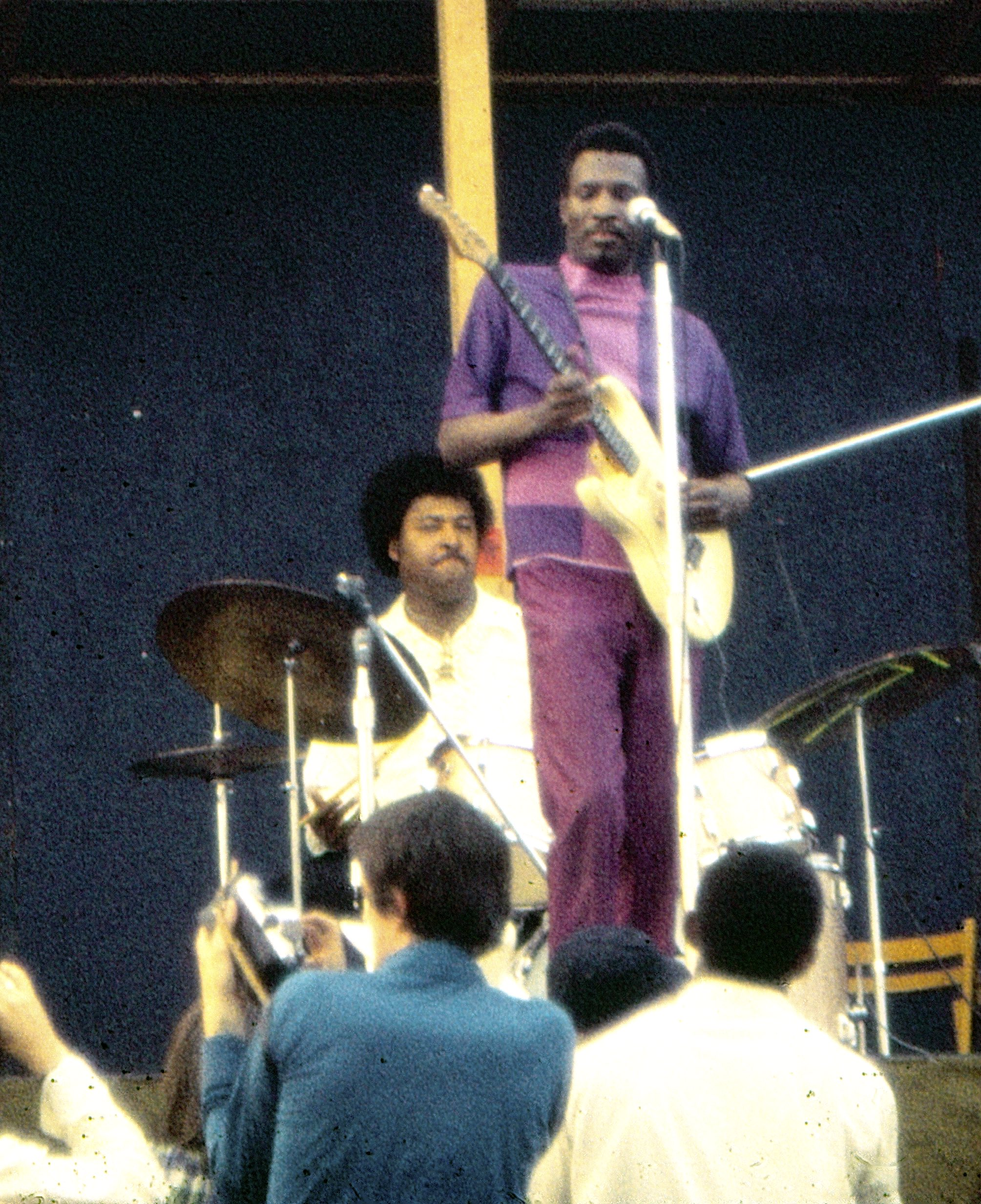
Magic Sam at the 1969 Ann Arbor Blues Festival

In 1963, his single "Feelin' Good (We're Gonna Boogie)" gained national attention. He successfully toured the U.S., Britain and Germany. He was signed to Delmark Records in 1967, for which he recorded West Side Soul and Black Magic. He continued performing live and toured with a band that included blues harp player Charlie Musselwhite, future Commander Cody and His Lost Planet Airmen bassist "Buffalo" Bruce Barlow and drummer Sam Lay. Magic Sam's breakthrough performance was at the Ann Arbor Blues Festival in 1969, which won him many bookings in the U.S. and Europe. He sometimes performed with his uncle, Shakey Jake Harris.

== Death ==
Maghett's grave at Restvale Cemetery

His career was cut short when he died of a heart attack in December 1969. He was 32 years old. Magic Sam was buried in the Restvale Cemetery, in Alsip, Illinois. He was survived by his wife, Georgia Maghett. In February 1970, the Butterfield Blues Band played at a benefit concert for Magic Sam, at Fillmore West in San Francisco. Also on the bill were Mike Bloomfield, Elvin Bishop, Charlie Musselwhite and Nick Gravenites.

== Legacy ==
Magic Sam's guitar style, vocals, and songwriting have inspired and influenced many blues musicians. "Magic Sam had a different guitar sound", said his record producer, Willie Dixon. "Most of the guys were playing the straight 12-bar blues thing, but the harmonies that he carried with the chords was a different thing altogether. This tune "All Your Love", he expressed with such an inspirational feeling with his high voice. You could always tell him, even from his introduction to the music."

His recording of the popular blues standard "Sweet Home Chicago" in 1967 has been identified as one of the most accomplished performances of the song. Author Stephen Thomas Erlewine writes:

He [Magic Sam] not only makes "Sweet Home Chicago" his own (no version before or since is as definitive as this), he creates the soul-injected, high-voltage modern blues sound that everybody has emulated and nobody has topped in the years since.

For the performance of the song in the 1980 film The Blues Brothers, John Belushi's character announces, "dedicate[d] to the late great Magic Sam".

== Awards and recognition ==
- 1982, Blues Foundation Blues Music Award for Magic Sam Live in the category Vintage or Reissue Album of the Year (US)
- 1982, Blues Foundation Hall of Fame, induction as Performer
- 1984, Blues Foundation Hall of Fame, West Side Soul selected in the category Classics of Blues Recordings – Albums
- 1990, Blues Foundation Hall of Fame, Black Magic selected in the category Classics of Blues Recordings – Albums

== Partial discography ==
Singles

List of singles with title, label, year, and composer
Title	Label	Year	Composer
"All Your Love"	Cobra (5013A)	1957	Sam Maghett
"Love Me with a Feeling"	Cobra (5013B)	1957	Hudson Whittaker a.k.a. Tampa Red
"Everything Gonna Be Alright"	Cobra (5021A)	1958	Willie Dixon
"Look Whatcha Done"	Cobra (5021B)	1958	Maghett
"All Night Long"	Cobra (5025A)	1958	Dixon
"All My Whole Life"	Cobra (5025B)	1958	Dixon
"Easy Baby"	Cobra (5029A)	1958	Dixon
"21 Days in Jail"	Cobra (5029B)	1958	Dixon, L.P. Weaver
"Mr. Charlie"	Chief (C7013A)	1960	Maghett
"My Love Is Your Love"	Chief (C7013B)	1960	Maghett
"Square Dance Rock Part 1" (instrumental)	Chief (C7017A)	1960	Maghett, Boyd Atkins
"Square Dance Rock Part 2" (instrumental)	Chief (C7017B)	1960	Maghett, Boyd Atkins
"Every Night About This Time"	Chief (C7026A)	1961	Antoine Domino Jr. a.k.a. Fats Domino, Dave Bartholomew
"Do the Camel Walk" (instrumental)	Chief (C7026B)	1961	Maghett, Mel London
"Blue Light Boogie"	Chief (C7033A)	1961	Jessie Mae Robinson
"You Don't Have to Work"	Chief (C7033B)	1961	Maghett
"Out of Bad Luck"	Crash (A425)	1966	Maghett, Al Benson
"She Belongs to Me"	Crash (B425)	1966	Maghett, Al Benson

Albums

List of albums with title, label, year, and comments
Title	Label	Year	Comments
West Side Soul	Delmark	1967	Recorded in Chicago, 1967
Black Magic	Delmark	1968	Recorded in Chicago, 1968
The Late Great Magic Sam	L+R; P-Vine (1990); Evidence (1995)	1980	Recorded 1963–1964, 1969
Magic Sam Live	Delmark	1981	Recorded live in Chicago, 1963–64, and Ann Arbor, 1969
Magic Touch (with Shakey Jake)	Black Magic; Black Top (1993); Rockbeat (2013)	1981	Recorded live in Chicago, 1966
The Magic Sam Legacy	Delmark	1989	Outtakes and alternate takes recorded in Chicago, 1966–1968
Give Me Time	Delmark	1991	Solo demo and home rehearsal recordings, 1968
With a Feeling! The Complete Cobra, Chief & Crash Recordings 1957–1966	Westside	2001	Most pre-Delmark recordings; also released as Out of Bad Luck, P-Vine (2003); released again as Everything Gonna Be Alright, Soul Jam (2021)
Rockin' Wild in Chicago	Delmark	2002	Recorded live in Chicago, 1963, 1964, 1966, 1968
Raw Blues! Live 1969	Rockbeat	2012	Recorded in Berkeley, 1969
Live at the Avant Garde	Delmark	2013	Recorded live in Milwaukee, 1968
