= Rockin' Johnny Burgin =

American blues guitarist (born 1969)

Johnny Burgin
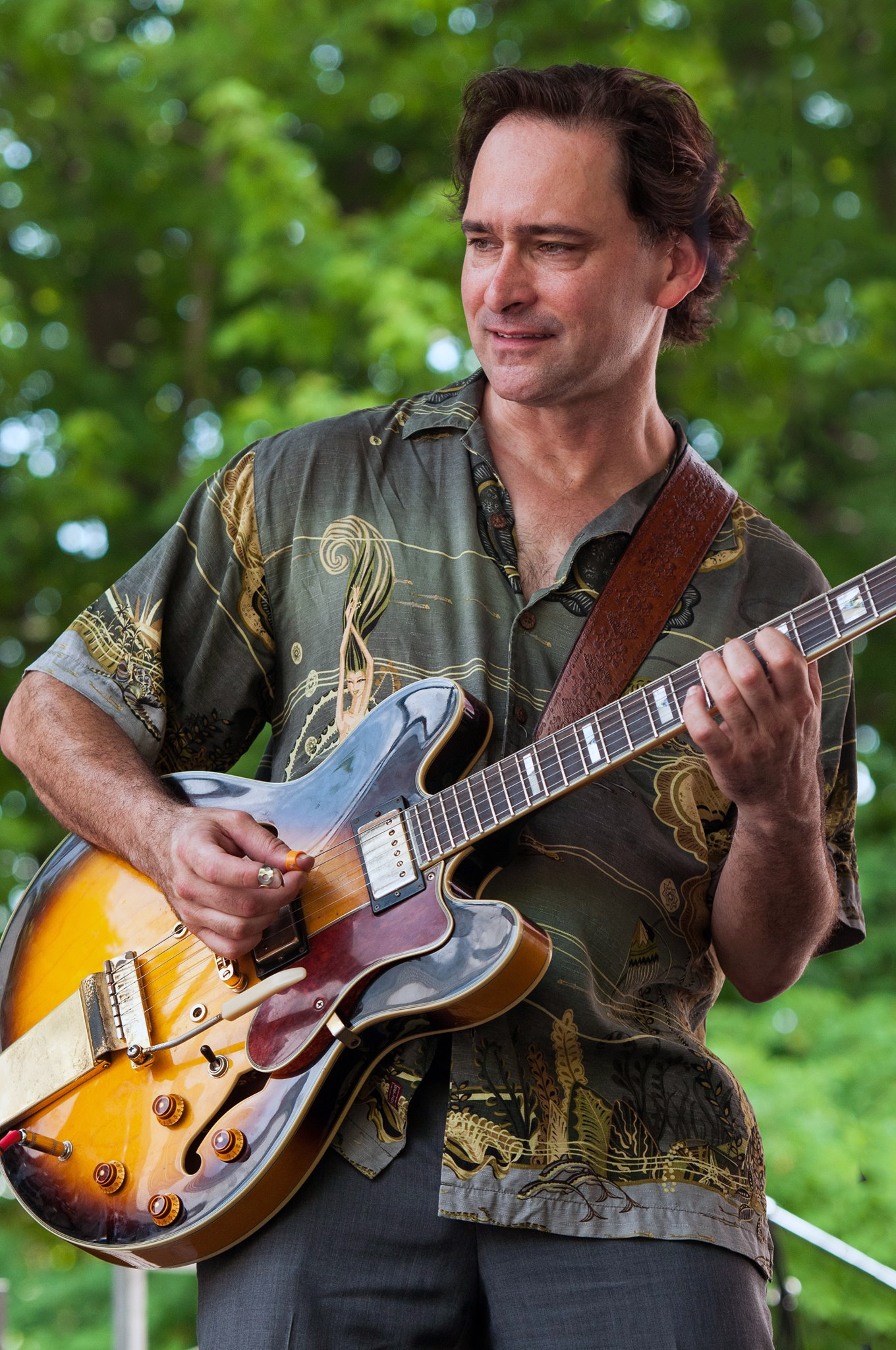
- Johnny Burgin at the 2017 Chicago Blues Festival

Background information
- Also known as: Rockin' Johnny Burgin
- Born: Johnny Burgin; July 17, 1969 (age 57); Williamsport, Pennsylvania, U.S.
- Genres: Chicago blues, electric blues
- Occupations: Guitarist, singer, songwriter
- Instruments: Guitar, harmonica, vocals
- Years active: 1990s–present
- Website: johnnyburgin.com

Johnny Burgin (born July 17, 1969) is an American blues guitarist, musician, and harmonica player. Since 1997, he has released ten albums under his name and has contributed to various recordings.

== Career ==
Johnny Burgin began performing in high school. He honed his blues style and performed on Thursday nights at Lilly's in Chicago's Lincoln Park neighborhood with the Ice Cream Men, a blues band that included Steve Cushing (drums), Scott Dirks (harp), and Dave Waldman (guitar).

As a student at the University of Chicago, he gained the nickname "Rockin' Johnny" for his work as a college radio DJ. In 1988, he met fellow DJ and harpist David Waldman, who had played and recorded with Tail Dragger Jones, Smokey Smothers, and others. This led to a trip to Chicago's West Side to meet and sit with Jones.

Burgin was then hired by Tail Dragger Jones and began playing four nights a week on Chicago's West Side with seasoned blues performers such as Eddie Burks, Mary Lane, Johnny B. Moore, Lurrie Bell, Little Mack Simmons, Little Arthur Duncan, Jimmy Dawkins, and Johnny Littlejohn, among others. He toured the Midwest with Pinetop Perkins, who often had Dave Meyers, a member of Aces, on bass. Burgin toured nationally for two years with Sam Lay, drummer for Howlin' Wolf and Paul Butterfield.

In 1994, Burgin began a residency at Smoke Daddy, a venue in Chicago's Wicker Park neighborhood. The band featured Jimmy Burns on vocals and guitar, Martin Lang on harp, Sho Komiya on bass, and either Kenny "Beedy Eyes" Smith (son of Willie "Big Eyes" Smith, drummer for Muddy Waters) or Kelly Littleton (drummer for Lil' Ed Williams). During the residency in 1996, Bob Koester, founder of Delmark Records, signed Jimmy Burns with Burgin's band after hearing one set.

Burgin recorded his debut CD "Straight Out Of Chicago" as a bandleader in 1997. Collaborations with other blues musicians and European tours followed.

In 2002, Burgin left the music business to focus on his family. He returned to music in January 2009. Chicago Tribune's Rick Kogan wrote on June 1 2015, that Burgin is a passionate blues musician.

Between 2010 and 2020, Burgin released seven CDs and increased his touring schedule to more than 250 performances yearly. In 2016, he moved from Chicago to California and collaborated with West Coast players such as Aki Kumar, Kid Andersen, Alabama Mike, Nick Gravenites, Nancy Wright, and Andy Santana.

== Personal life ==
Johnny Burgin was born on July 17, 1969, in Williamsport, Pennsylvania, but grew up in Starkville, Mississippi, his father's hometown. Burgin's father was an actor and folk musician who taught him how to play guitar. In 1988, he moved to Chicago, Illinois, to attend the University of Chicago.

He relocated from Chicago to Petaluma, California in 2016 and then to New Orleans, Louisiana in 2021. He dropped the "Rockin'" from his name in 2019 and now goes simply by Johnny Burgin.

== Discography ==
AS BAND LEADER

Ramblin' From Coast to Coast	2024	Straight Shooter	With special guests John Blues Boyd, Rae Gordon, Dylan Bishop, Hanna PK, Ben Levin, Jad Tariq, and 14 other musicians during Burgin's travels to Rochester, N.Y., Cincinnati, Ohio, Memphis, Tenn., and Dallas, Texas. Mixed and mastered by Kid Andersen at Greaseland Studios in San Jose, Calif.
No Border Blues Japan	2020	Delmark	The first American compilation of the underground Japanese Blues Scene. With Lee Kanehira, Minoru Maruyama, Kotez, Nacomi Tanaka, Yoshimi Hirata, Kaz Ohnogi, Takagiman, Iper Onishi, Ataka Suzuki, Hironori Yanaga, Fumiko Maejima, Stephen Dougherty and Chris Matheos. Recorded at Fukada Studio, Osaka by Yoshikazu Madokoro. Mixed and mastered by Steve Wagner at Riverside Studio, Chicago.
Johnny Burgin Live	2019	Delmark	With special guests Charlie Musselwhite, Rae Gordon, Nancy Wright, Aki Kumar, and Kid Andersen. Recorded and mixed by Kid Anderson, mastered by Steve Wagner.
Rockin' Johnny and Quique Gomez	2019	Vizztone Label Group	Features Greg Izor, Josh Fulero, Christian Dozzler. Recorded in Toledo, Spain at Casa Madera and Austin Texas at Alnico Studio.
Neoprene Fedora	2017	West Tone	Features Kid Andersen, Nancy Wright, Aki Kumar, and Alabama Mike
Greetings from Greaseland	2015	West Coast Records	Features Kid Andersen (guitar) and Aki Kumar (harp)
Grim Reaper	2012	Delmark	Reached No. 7 on the Living Blues Radio charts
Now's the Time	2010	5105 Music	
More Real Folk Blues	2000	Midwest Artists	Out of print
Man's Temptation	1998	Delmark	
Straight Out of Chicago	1997	Delmark	

AS SIDEMAN

Chicago: The Blues Legends: Today!	Mary Lane, Little Jerry Jones, Milwaukee Slim, Mike Mettalia.	2019	West Tone	
Tony Holiday's Porch Sessions		2019	Vizztone	
Howlin' At Greaseland	John Blues Boyd, Tail Dragger Jones, Terry Hanck, Lee Donald and Alabama Mike	2018	West Tone	Nominated for a BMA for Best Traditional Blues CD. An all-star cast of Chicago and California musicians pay tribute to the music of Howlin' Wolf
Chicago Blues Harp Sessions	Martin Lang	2015	Random Chance	
'Straight Blues'	Peter Struijk	2015	Blueshine Records (Netherlands)	
Cell Phone Man	Willie Buck	2014	Delmark	Reached No. 1 on the Living Blues radio charts; Johnny Burgin played guitar and acoustic guitar and served as producer; Barrelhouse Chuck made a guest appearance; Scott Dirks wrote the liner notes
Tail Dragger Live at Rooster's Lounge	Tail Dragger Jones		Delmark (DVD)	Features Jimmy Dawkins, Johnny Burgin, Kevin Shanahan, Martin Lang, Rob Lorenz and Todd Fackler; Johnny Burgin wrote the liner notes
Chicago Jump	Jimmy Lee Robinson	2004	Random Chance	
Killer Diller	Shirley Johnson	2002	Delmark	
Alive in the City	The Mighty Blue Kings	2001		
deLay Does Chicago	Paul deLay	1999	Evidence	Features Johnny Burgin Band (courtesy of Delmark Records); Special guests included Jimmy Dawkins (courtesy of Ichiban Records) and Zora Young
Singin' With the Sun	Little Arthur Duncan	1999	Delmark	Johnny Burgin wrote the liner notes, was a producer, and played guitar on this recording; Also on this recording: Billy Flynn, Martin Lang, Eddie Taylor Jr. and Kenny "Beedy Eyes" Smith
American People	Tail Dragger Jones	1999	Delmark	
Chicago Blues: Rockin' After Midnight	Various Artists	1998	St. George	Johnny Burgin backed up Andre Williams and Paul Jones (of Manfred Mann)
Rib Tips Live	Little Arthur Duncan	1997	Random Chance	
Blues Before Sunrise: Live Vol. 1	John Brim, Billy Boy Arnold, Big Wheeler, Jimmy Burns	1997	Delmark	A Benefit for Steve Cushing's Radio Show
Leaving Here Walking	Jimmy Burns	1996	Delmark	Named the Best Blues Record of the Year by the National Association of Independent Record Distributors; Received two W.C. Handy Award nominations.; Produced by Scott Dirks
Crawlin' Kingsnake	Tail Dragger Jones and his Chicago Blues Band	1995	St. George	
Lonely Traveler	Jimmy Lee Robinson	1993	Delmark	
Big Wheeler's Bone Orchard with the Ice Cream Men	Golden "Big" Wheeler	1992	Delmark	
