= Demetria Taylor =

American singer and songwriter

- Born: Demetria M. Taylor; February 28, 1973 (age 52); Chicago, Illinois, U.S.
- Genres: Chicago blues, electric blues
- Occupation(s): Singer, songwriter
- Instrument: Vocals
- Years active: 2000s–present
- Labels: Delmark

Demetria M. Taylor (born February 28, 1973) is an American Chicago blues singer and songwriter. Her father was Eddie Taylor, a fellow Chicago blues musician. Her step-brother Larry Taylor is a blues drummer and vocalist, and her brother Eddie Taylor Jr. was also a Chicago blues musician prior to his death in 2019, at the age of 46. Taylor's mother, Vera (Leevera), was the niece of the bluesmen Eddie "Guitar" Burns and Jimmy Burns, and maintained an intermittent career as a singer until her death in 1999.

Taylor has released two albums on Delmark Records, albeit over 11 years apart.

== Life and career ==
She was born in Chicago, Illinois, as the seventh child out of eight in a musical family. She began playing drums at the age of 14, mentored by her older brothers Larry and Tim, who were both professional blues drummers. She played in family shows across Chicago, which included her guitar playing brother Eddie Taylor Jr. She also sang in the gospel choir at Trinity All Nations Church on Chicago's South Side. Her influences were Etta James, Bessie Smith, Big Mama Thornton, and the unrelated Koko Taylor. When she commenced performing professionally, Taylor noted, "It was fun for me when I first started at Buddy Guy's, opening for Billy Branch and Jimmy Johnson". She went on tour both nationally at first and then overseas.

Her debut album, Bad Girl, was released on May 17, 2011 on Delmark Records. The album incorporated musical work from Billy Branch, Eddie Shaw, Big Time Sarah, Eddie Taylor Jr., plus Shun Kikuta, Roosevelt Purifoy, Greg McDaniel and Pookie Styx. Bad Girl had eleven tracks including "I'm A Woman/Hoochie Coochie Woman", "All Your Love", "Big Boss Man", and a duet with Big Time Sarah on "Wang Dang Doodle". Taylor was nominated in the 2012 Blues Music Awards in the 'Best New Debut Artist' category. She has since performed at numerous venues and music festivals, including appearing at the Chicago Blues Festival. Taylor explained her philosophy, "I put God first and everything else will work out. I feel that singing is something I was born to do. Sometimes on the stage my eyes tear up as I feel the music I'm singing".

Her sophomore album was some time in its making. It was recorded in Chicago, at Delmark's Riverside Studio, between 2019 and 2022. Doin' What I'm Supposed to Do was released on Delmark Records on August 19, 2022. The songs on the album were written by members of her family, some by fellow musicians Mike Wheeler and Larry Williams, one by Magic Sam, plus a couple of numbers penned by Taylor herself. Lead guitar duties were shared between Mike Wheeler, Billy Flynn and Carlos Showers, with the album produced jointly by Julia A. Miller and Elbio Barilari. A guest appearance came from Deitra Farr who sang on one of the album's tracks, "Blues Early This Morning", which was written by Demetria's mother, Vera Taylor. Whereas Billy Flynn played guitar on the aforementioned song, as well as on "(Wreck On) Highway 83", written by Demetria's father, Eddie Taylor. The 52-minute CD, Doin' What I'm Supposed To Do, had a record release party held at Space in Evanston, Illinois, on August 22, 2022.

Taylor was the new recipient of the Koko Taylor 'Queen of the Blues' Award in 2022, given by the Jus' Blues Foundation. She received the award during a ceremony at the Bluesville Music Hall in Tunica, Mississippi.

Taylor is married with eight children.

== Discography ==
Year	Title	Record label
2011	Bad Girl	Delmark Records
2022	Doin' What I'm Supposed to Do	Delmark Records

== See also ==
- List of Chicago blues musicians
- List of electric blues musicians
