= Holle Thee Maxwell =

American vocalist and songwriter (born 1945)

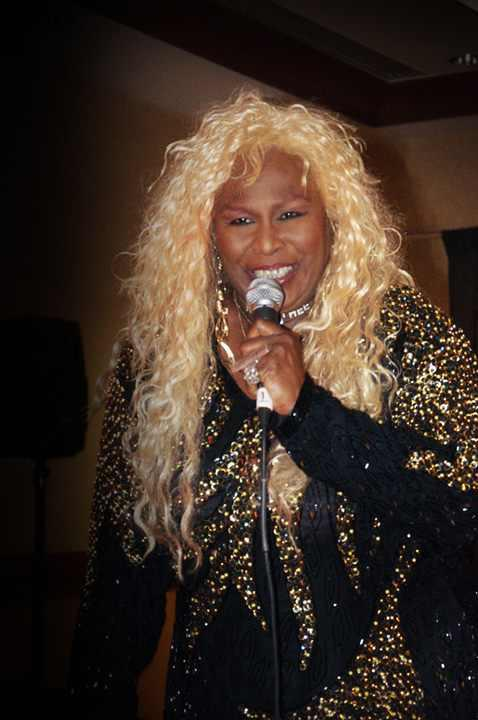
- Maxwell at Lincoln Center, 2013.

Background information
- Also known as: Holly Maxx; Holly Maxwell; Holle Thee Maxwell; The Original Black Blonde Bombshell
- Born: Holly Maxwell; October 17, 1945 (age 80); Chicago, Illinois, United States
- Genres: Jazz; Soul; Blues; R&B
- Occupations: Singer; songwriter; musician
- Instruments: Vocals; piano
- Years active: 1959–present

Holle Thee Maxwell (born Holle'Thee MarClaRoDe' Maxwell; October 17, 1945) is an American singer and songwriter. Maxwell has performed with soul and blues artist Ike Turner and jazz organist Jimmy Smith. Maxwell wrote a song for Bobby Bland's 1978 album, Come Fly with Me.

Beginning her professional career in the late–1950s, her background includes opera training in childhood, being presented at Civic Opera House at 12 years young in solo concert by Rev. Dr. Lena McLen and her mother Eula Thee Gladys Maxwell, performances as a soul balladeer in the 1960s, European tours, and appearances at the Chicago Blues Festival. The Cannes Musical Festival named her "Queen of Entertaining Entertainers".

== Life and career ==
Maxwell first sang professionally at the age of five. She studied classical voice and piano from ages nine to seventeen. At age twelve, she was featured at the Chicago Civic Opera House. Maxwell holds two degrees in music from the Chicago Musical College of Roosevelt University and The Juilliard School.

Her mother sent her to modeling and finishing school and made her take classical musical training, but Maxwell discovered soul when she was in high school. She said, "Around the age of seventeen, I started sneaking around off to the nightclubs and looking at Harold Burrage, Otis Clay, Little Johnny Williams. I used to watch these artists because they had so much soul, so much whatever." She briefly sang with a girl group, the Tourjourettes, while attending Parker High School in Chicago.

Bunky Sheppard discovered Maxwell in early 1965 and produced her first singles for Constellation Records, starting with "One Thin Dime", which received airplay in Chicago. In the summer of 1965, Maxwell was featured in Beatrice Watson's column in the Chicago Defender. Chicago Soul historian Robert Pruter wrote the following about Watson's report:

...Holly's mother, Eula Maxwell, took pains to assure the Defender reporter that her daughter was still progressing toward becoming an opera singer. Holly herself pointed out that she had been singing jazz for two and a half years and was singing r&b as a step up.

Star Records produced Maxwell's single "Philly Barracuda" in 1966, complete with instructions on how to perform the "Philly Dog" dance. Star promoted the record with an appearance of deejay Herb Kent at the Crane High School, with Maxwell getting up on the table to sing the song while demonstrating how to do the dance.

Maxwell reached a crossroads in her career when she made the mistake in 1967 of singing the pop song "Misty" while performing at a Chicago R&B nightclub called Peyton Place on the same bill as Hi-Fi White, a blues vocalist and transvestite comedian known for lewd jokes. When she ran crying to the dressing room after the audience threw oranges and beer bottles at her, White told her, "Honey, you ain't got no soul." She was determined to "get soul". She listened to Gladys Knight and Aretha Franklin and practiced singing for four months until she taught herself to sing soul at the age of twenty-two. She returned to Peyton Place and bedazzled the audience with a "devastating" rendition of "Respect".

Maxwell had solo gigs in Chicago clubs and occasionally sang backup for Barbara Acklin. Maxwell recorded singles for Curtom Records, Smit Whit Records, and Star Records in the 1960s and 1970s. She had regional hits in the United States with the songs "Only When You're Lonely", "One Thin Dime", "Never Love Again", "Suffer", and "Philly Barracuda". Her singles are popular with collectors worldwide, especially Northern Soul enthusiasts in Europe. John Clemente placed her single "Only When You're Lonely" in his list of "500 Most Collectable Girl Group 45s" in 2013.

Maxwell lived to California for most of the 1970s and early 1980s. During this time she owned a nightclub and sang for two years with jazz organist Jimmy Smith. She replaced Tina Turner in Ike Turner's band from 1977 to 1985, mostly in Europe. She performed with Ike Turner again for eight months in 1992. Despite the controversy surrounding Tina Turner's separation from Ike Turner, Maxwell reported a positive professional relationship with him.

Maxwell returned to Chicago in 1985. French club owner Gérard Vacher saw her perform at the Kingston Mines in 1996 and booked her at his club, Quai du Blues, later known as the Maxwell Café Supper Club. She became a co-owner of the club, known in France as "the home of real American blues." In 2005 she was still a hit in France. She was a regular performer at the Maxwell Café in Paris and nightclubs in London and Europe. She was named "Queen of Entertaining Entertainers" by the Cannes Musical Festival.

Maxwell joined Chicago Women in Blues at Reggie's Rock Club in Chicago in 2011 in response to the lineup of almost all male performers at the Chicago Blues Festival . She hosted an all-female performance at the 2011 Chicago Blues Festival, featuring Liz Mandeville, Demetria Taylor, Peaches Staten, and Ramblin' Rose. In January 2014, the Great Black Music Project of the Northeastern Illinois University honored Maxwell by adding her to their artist registry and podcasting their interview of her about her music career.

Maxwell has never stopped working in her seven-decade career, from opera training in childhood to performing as a soul balladeer in the 1960s, to extensive touring in Europe, to currently performing in Chicago clubs and at the Chicago Blues Festival and hosting a musical and historical tour of Chicago's soul and blues with Jimmy Burns. Her music continues to be presented to global audiences on KJAZZ Radio UK. George Blaise described her as a "true queen of [the] Chicago blues scene" in an interview on his WICU-TV program 26 N. Halsted on December 30, 2014.

== Awards ==
- On June 8, 2014, Maxwell was inducted into the Chicago Blues Hall of Fame ® at Buddy Guy's Legends.
- She was awarded a Lifetime Achievement Award by the Chicago Music Awards on March 15, 2015.
- On November 1, 2016, the Chicago City Council celebrated Maxwell's 71st birthday and acclaimed her music career of 7 decades as a legendary Chicago entertainer.
- On October 15, 2017, Maxwell was presented the Chicago Blues Legend Award.

== Music and performance style ==
Maxwell sings and plays the piano. American Blues News reported that her early influences included Shirley Temple, Mae West, Marian Anderson, Josephine Baker, and Dinah Shore. Blues singer Bobby Bland sang her song "Ain't God Something" on his album Come Fly with Me.

In 1978, South African reviewer Roy Christie credited the success of the Jimmy Smith show to "the electrifying performance of Holly Maxwell." He wrote, "She is virtually a reincarnation of Billie Holiday." Reviewer Aaron Cohen more recently described Maxwell's rendition of Billie Holiday's "God Bless the Child" as conveying "outright defiance." Other observers stated that her performance of the song moved people to cry or cheer.

An American Blues News reviewer commented that Maxwell has versatile performance abilities. He wrote, "When she picks up a mike, the cord is a fuse, because she explodes on stage... She can be quite bawdy at times and her audiences love it, including me!" Blues critic David Whiteis stated in 2009 that Maxwell's performance style evolved from a "sweet voiced 'girl singer' who melted hearts back in the day" to "a growling, provocatively clad sex kitten."

== Book ==
Maxwell released her self-published book about Ike Turner, Freebase Ain't Free, in 2018. Blues critic David Whiteis recounts that Maxwell conveys a different man than is commonly reported in the press. When Maxwell was an occasional lead singer for Turner, she became 'inseparable' friends with him. Maxwell wrote that Turner was "a kindly man of depth and generosity" despite his dark side that included serious drug addiction and a toxic, mutually abusive relationship with his wife, Tina. Whiteis reports that "Maxwell reminds us that Ike Turner’s life and legacy exemplify what Gordon portrayed in It Came from Memphis – 'the grit that produces the pearls'."

== Discography ==
=== Singles ===
- "(Happiness Will Cost You) One Thin Dime" / "It's Impossible" (1965), Constellation Records
- "Philly Barracuda Part 1" (1966), Star
- "Philly Barracuda Part 2" (1966), Star
- "Don't Say You Love Me Until You Do" / "Blueberry Hill" (1966), Star
- "Heartbeat" / "It Was a Very Good Year" (1967), Checker Records
- "Suffer", with backup vocals by the Impressions (1969), Curtom Records
- "Never Love Again" / "Winter Go Away" (3 versions) (1970), Smit-Whit Records
- "Only When You're Lonely" / "Let Him Go for Himself" (2010 promo), Constellation Records
- "Only When You're Lonely" (2012), Holle Thee Maxwell

=== Albums ===
- Holle Thee Maxwell...Thee Blonde Bombshell (1972), unknown record label
- Jimmy Smith Plays for the People, with vocals by Maxwell, H. Ray Crawford, and Kenny Dixon (1978), unknown record label
- The Northern Soul of Constellation, with four tracks by Maxwell (release date unknown), Base Camp Records
- The Northern Soul of Chicago, vol. 1, with one track by Maxwell (1993), Goldmine Soul Supply
- Live at Quai du Blues (2004), Virgin Records
- All Kinds'a Blues ... All Kinds'a All Ways (2012), TuneCore
