= Nacomi Tanaka =

Japanese blues singer and guitarist

Nacomi Tanaka 田中 名鼓美
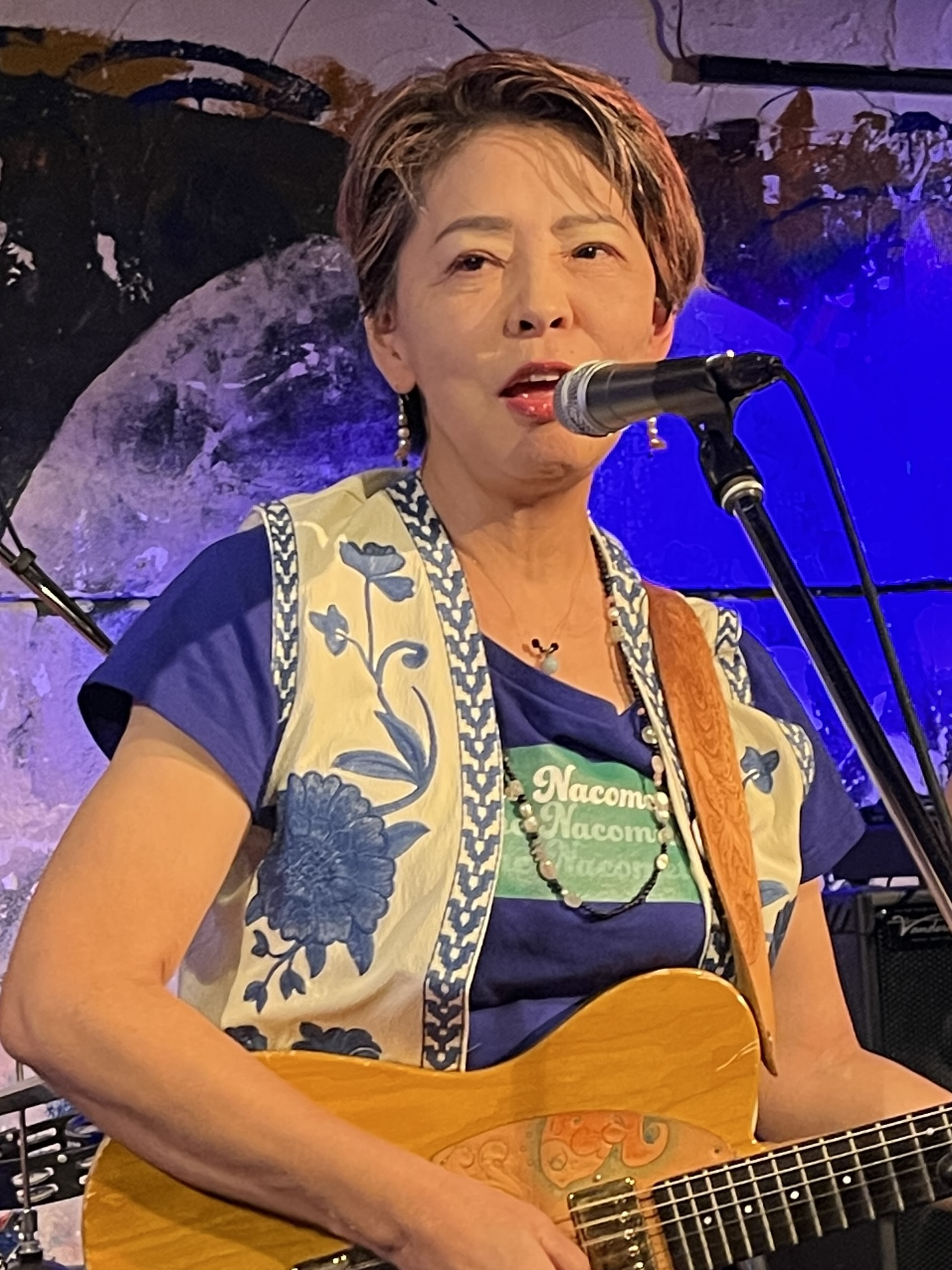
- Nacomi Tanaka (2023)

Background information
- Born: Kyoto, Kyoto Prefecture, Japan
- Genres: Blues, pop
- Occupation(s): Musician, singer
- Instrument(s): guitar, vocals
- Years active: 2000–present
- Labels: P-Vine, BSMF
- Website: nacomitanaka.com

Nacomi Tanaka (田中 名鼓美) or sometimes simply referred to as Nacomi is a Japanese blues singer, guitarist and songwriter. She often expands her boundaries beyond blues music into sounds of American roots and Japanese pops sung in Japanese. She is currently based in Kobe.

== Life and career ==
Nacomi was born in Kyoto. Influenced since youth by her father who loved foreign music, she grew up listening to American music such as country and jazz. She picked up an acoustic guitar when she entered middle school, and formed her own band during high school days.

She studied at Doshisha University, and while she was a student there, she entered an amateur band contest "8.8Rockday" with Karasuma Shako, an R&B band she had formed with friends she met at the college music club, and they proceeded to the finals.

She found work after college graduation and retired from performing then, but in 2000, she returned to the music scene. In 2001, she met Shinji Shiotsugu, a renowned blues guitarist, and joined his band where she stayed for the next two years. After she left the band, she formed her own.

In 2007, she made a CD debut with album Grabbed My Heart. The following year in 2008, she appeared at the Taipei International Blues Bash in Taiwan for the first time, and she continued to play at the event for the next 7 years. She has been proactively performing overseas appearing at events outside Japan such as the Little Walter Music Festival in Alexandria, Louisiana (three times after 2014), and a festival in Shanghai.

In 2015, she released an album with covers of Little Walter titled Nacomi Sings Little Walter with her blues band Nacomi & The Blues Temple.

In 2019, she took part in Johnny Burgin’s album recording session done in Japan. It was released the following year by Delmark Records titled No Border Blues. P-Vine Records released it in Japan under the Japanese title ブルースに国境はない which is a direct translation of the original.

In 2021, P-Vine Records released Nacomi's best compilation album Onward And Upward containing three new songs. An original album The Nacometers followed from the label in 2023. The Nacometers is another band led by Nacomi apart from the Blues Temple. With this album, her sound is more towards American roots music.

Nacomi announced that Nacomi & The Blues Temple would break up in December of 2024 after 11 years since its formation. Pierre Ochiai, the guitarist of the band’s physical strength limitation was the reason given.

== Discography ==
- 2007 Grabbed My Heart (BSMF)
- 2010 Kingyo no Swampie (金魚のSwampie) (BSMF)
- 2015 Nacomi Sings Little Walter (Swampie) - with The Blues Temple
- 2018 Bluesy Pop (Bass & Songs)
- 2023 The Nacometers (P-Vine)

=== Compilations ===
- 2021 Onward & Upward (P-Vine)
