= Professor Eddie Lusk =

American Chicago blues musician

- Born: Eddie James Lusk, Jr. September 21, 1948; Chicago, Illinois, United States
- Died: August 26, 1992 (aged 43) Chicago, Illinois, United States
- Genres: Chicago blues
- Occupation: Musician
- Instruments: Keyboards, piano
- Years active: 1960s–1992

Eddie James Lusk, Jr. known professionally as Professor Eddie Lusk (September 21, 1948 – August 26, 1992) was an American Chicago blues musician. An ordained minister, Lusk carved out a successful career in the blues and variously worked with Luther Allison, Buddy Guy, Jimmy Johnson, Koko Taylor, Phil Guy, Jimmy Dawkins, Sunnyland Slim, Michael Coleman, Fenton Robinson, Syl Johnson, and Otis Rush.

Rolling Stone named Lusk as one of Chicago's most underrated blues players.

== Early life and education ==
Eddie Lusk was born in Chicago, Illinois, United States, to parents who were ordained ministers in the Pentecostal Church. On Chicago's South Side they ran The Lusk Bible Way Center, and once Lusk was old enough he began playing the piano there. The blues music seeping from the nearby Pepper's Lounge proved a big distraction for the young Lusk. He became ordained himself in 1968, and gained a bachelor's degree in business administration at Northwestern University, but his love for the blues saw him installed at the Shiloh Academy. It was this connection that tempted Professor Longhair to bestow the title of 'Professor' on his young music disciple.

== Career ==
An accomplished keyboard and piano player, Lusk backed Luther Allison for three years before his work saw him regularly used as a session and touring musician. Throughout the 1980s and early 1990s, Lusk recorded with Buddy Guy (Breaking Out, 1980), Jimmy Johnson (North/South, 1982), Koko Taylor (Queen of the Blues, 1985), Phil Guy (It's a Real Mutha, 1985 and All Star Chicago Blues Session, 1994), Jimmy Dawkins (Feel the Blues, 1985 and Kant Sheek Dees Bluze, 1992), Sunnyland Slim (Be Careful How You Vote, 1989), Michael Coleman (Back Breaking Blues, 1990), and Nate Taylor (Hard Times, 1992). Lusk also toured nationally with some of those musicians and backed Fenton Robinson, Syl Johnson, and Otis Rush on the road.

In 1985, Lusk joined Jimmy Dawkins, Eddie C. Campbell, Lowell Fulson and Anthony Palmer on Can't Sit Down! (JSP Records). With growing confidence and experience, Lusk formed his own band named the Professor's Blues Review, and with the singer Gloria Hardiman, recorded "Meet Me With Your Black Drawers On" for the 1987 Alligator Records compilation album, New Bluebloods. On his only solo album, Professor Strut (1989), Hardiman was replaced by Karen Carroll. His work also later appeared on the various artists compilation, Black and Blue, Vol. 2 (1998). Lusk and Hardiman's version of "Meet Me With Your Black Drawers On" has become a hit in the Carolina beach music scene.

He and his band appeared in the 1991 film, V. I. Warshawski, and later that year toured across Europe with Michael Coleman and Kenny Neal. In 1993, Lusk's prior recording entitled, Chicago Blues Festival 91, with Coleman and Neal was released.

== Personal life ==
Lusk was diagnosed with colorectal cancer, brought on by AIDS in 1992.

He killed himself on August 26, 1992, at the age of 48.

== Discography ==
=== Albums ===
Year	Title	Record label
1989	Professor Strut	Delmark Records
