= Barkin' Bill Smith =

American singer

Background information
- Born: August 18, 1928; Cleveland, Mississippi, United States
- Died: April 24, 2000 (aged 71) Chicago, Illinois, United States
- Genres: Chicago blues, electric blues
- Occupations: Singer, songwriter
- Instrument: Vocals
- Years active: 1950s–2000
- Label: Delmark

Barkin' Bill Smith (August 18, 1928 – April 24, 2000) was an American Chicago blues and electric blues singer and songwriter. He was born in Cleveland, Mississippi, and in his latter years lived in Chicago.

== Biography ==
Smith was raised in Mississippi and later relocated to East St. Louis, Detroit and finally Chicago. He obtained his stage name from Homesick James in 1958, after the pair had worked together. Smith sang in front of various blues bands around Chicago for many years. He was initially influenced by Joe Williams, Jimmy Witherspoon and Brook Benton. He made his recording debut in 1991, singing on Dave Specter's first album, Bluebird Blues. Delmark Records issued Smith's solo debut album, Gotcha!, in 1994, with Steve Freund playing guitar.

In his latter years declining health restricted his live appearances.

Smith died of pancreatic cancer in Chicago in April 2000, at the age of 71.

== Solo album discography ==
- Gotcha! (1994), Delmark

== See also ==
- List of Chicago blues musicians
- List of electric blues musicians
