= Dave Specter =

American jazz and blues guitarist (born 1963)

- Born: May 21, 1963 (age 63); Chicago, Illinois, US
- Genres: Blues; jazz
- Occupation: Guitarist
- Instrument: Guitar
- Years active: Mid 1980s–present
- Label: Delmark
- Website: http://www.davespecter.org/index.html

Dave Specter (born May 21, 1963) is an American Chicago blues and jazz guitarist.

== Biography ==
Hailing from Chicago's Northwest side, Specter began to learn to play the guitar at the age of 18. His teacher was Steve Freund, who taught Specter between the latter's duties at the Jazz Record Mart and Delmark Records. Freund eventually organized a concert tour for Specter alongside Sam Lay and Hubert Sumlin. Contacts made while working at the B.L.U.E.S. nightclub secured gigs as a sideman to Johnny Littlejohn, Son Seals, and the Legendary Blues Band. By 1989 Specter had assembled his own backing band, known as the Bluebirds.

By 1998 Specter had released five albums on the Delmark label, combining a mixture of blues (Specter listed his influences as being T-Bone Walker, Pee Wee Crayton, Magic Sam, and Otis Rush) and jazz (Kenny Burrell is another inspiration). Specter does not sing, and he enlisted Barkin' Bill Smith as his first vocalist, performing on Specter's 1991 debut album, Bluebird Blues. Specter made a guest appearance with Jesse Fortune, providing accompaniment on Fortune Tellin' Man (1993). Harmonica player and singer Tad Robinson took over on the Bluebirds' Blueplicity (1994) and Live In Europe (1995). After Robinson's departure, Lynwood Slim became the band's vocalist.

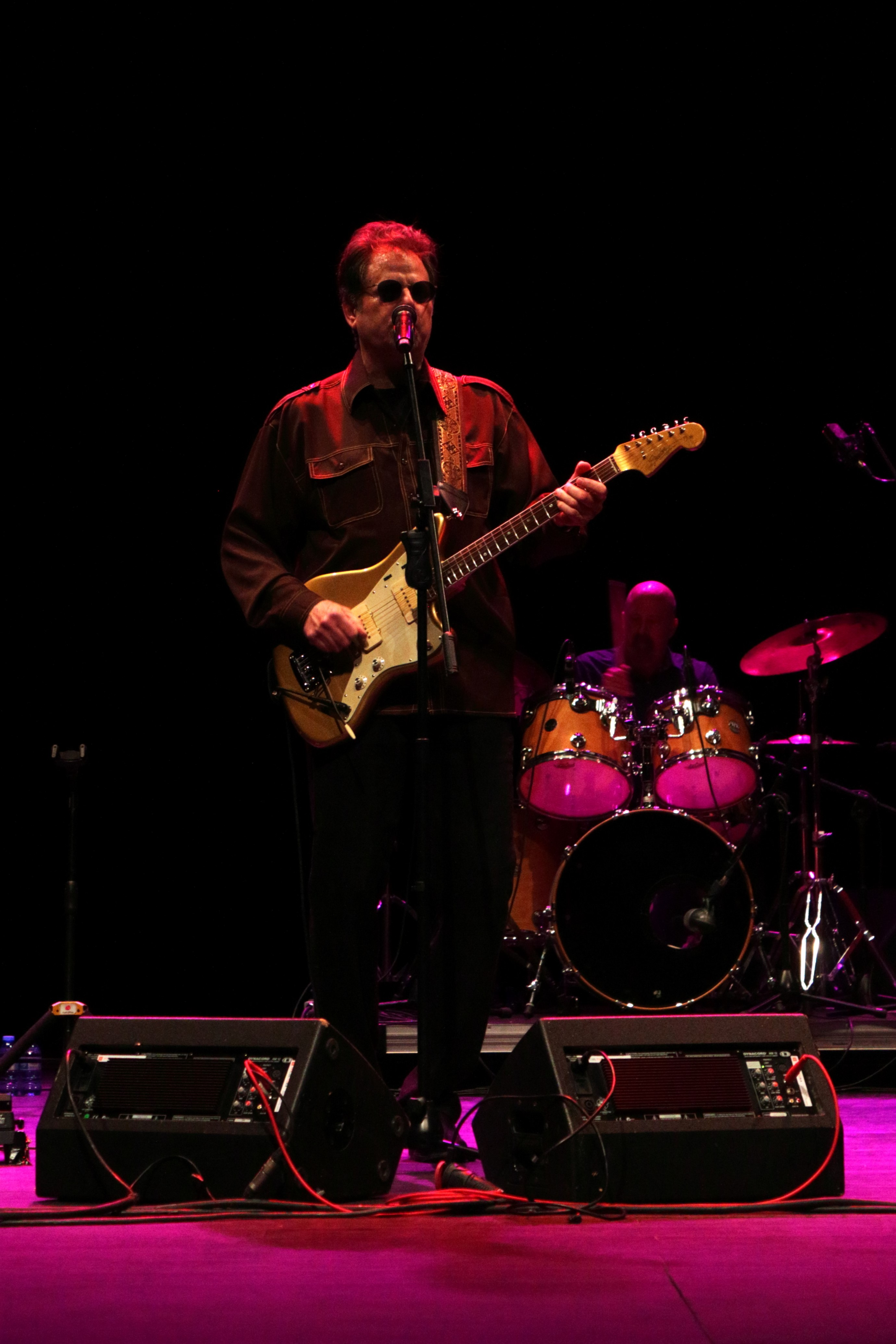
Specter performing in La Vila Joiosa, Spain, March 2024

Jazz influences prevailed as time passed, and Specter invited Brother Jack McDuff to play the Hammond organ on the next album, Left Turn On Blue (1996). Lenny Lynn took over vocal duties on the next release, Blues Spoken Here (1998). In 2000, Speculatin' came out but Specter eschewed vocals altogether, releasing 13 instrumental tracks. Is What It Is with Steve Freund (2004) was followed by Live in Chicago (2008).

In addition to his recordings, Specter undertakes frequent tours to Europe and beyond.

== Discography ==
- Bluebird Blues (Delmark DD-652, 1991) - with Barkin' Bill Smith, Ronnie Earl
- Fortune Tellin' Man, Jesse Fortune (Delmark DD-658, 1993)
- Blueplicity (Delmark DD-664, 1994) - with Tad Robinson
- Live in Europe (Delmark DE-677, 1995) - with Tad Robinson
- Left Turn on Blue (Delmark DE-693, 1996) - with Lynwood Slim, Jack McDuff
- Blues Spoken Here (Delmark DE-721, 1998) - with Lenny Lynn, Eric Alexander
- Speculatin' (Delmark DE-744, 2000)
- Is What It Is (Delmark DE-779, 2004) - with Steve Freund
- Live in Chicago (Delmark DE-794, 2008) - with Jimmy Johnson, Tad Robinson, Sharon Lewis
- Spectified (Fret12 30021, 2010)
- Message in Blue (Delmark DE-836, 2014) - with Otis Clay
- Blues...from the Inside Out (Delmark DE-859, 2019) - with Jorma Kaukonen, Brother John Kattke
- SIX STRING SOUL: 30 YEARS ON DELMARK (Delmark DE-870, 2021) 2-CD compilation
- Live At Space (Delmark DE-889, 2025)

== Legacy ==
Music journalist, Tony Russell wrote that "an extended, uncluttered view of Specter's music is noteworthy in his performance at a 1994 German concert, in a quartet with the correspondingly idiomatic harmonica playing and soulful singing of Tad Robinson".

== See also ==
- List of Chicago blues musicians
- List of electric blues musicians
