= Englewood STEM High School =

Coordinates: 41.7703°N 87.6364°W

Location
- 6835 South Normal Boulevard; Chicago, Illinois 60621; United States

Information
- School type: Public; Secondary
- Motto: Temet Nosce
- Opened: September 3, 2019
- School district: Chicago Public Schools
- Principal: Christopher Shelton
- Teaching staff: 48.00 (on an FTE basis)
- Grades: 9–12
- Gender: Coed
- Enrollment: 778 (2024-25)
- Student to teacher ratio: 16.21
- Campus type: Urban
- Colors: Columbia Blue; White; Black
- Athletics conference: Chicago Public League
- Team name: Panthers
- Accreditation: North Central Association of Colleges and Schools
- Website: englewoodstemhs.cps.edu

Englewood STEM High School (ESHS) is a public four-year high school located in the Englewood neighborhood of Chicago, Illinois, United States. Opened on September 3, 2019, Englewood STEM is a part of the Chicago Public Schools district and serves students in both the Englewood and West Englewood community areas.

== History ==
Planning for Englewood STEM began in 2017 when the Chicago Board of Education decided to close Robeson High School due to declining enrollment and poor academic performance. Construction of Englewood STEM, an $85 million high school began in July 2018, after the closure of Robeson the previous month. Englewood STEM was completed in August 2019, opening its doors on September 3, 2019.

In addition to replacing Robeson, Englewood STEM also served as a replacement for Harper High School, Hope College Prep and Team Englewood, which were also deemed as under enrolled and poor academic performing schools by the school district. The school began serving grades 9–12, beginning in the 2022–2023 school year.

=== Other information ===
On April 25, 2022, Four people, a parent and three students were arrested and charged with misdemeanor battery along with criminal trespassing after a fight inside the school.

== Athletics ==
The Englewood STEM high school sports teams are called the Panthers. In the 2022-2023 season, the panthers football team went 5-0.
