= Absent Minded =

Absent Minded may refer to:

- Absent-mindedness
- Absent Minded (Swedish rapper), released the album Extreme Paranoia in Stocktown 1996
- Absent Minded, album by Polish band Mikrokolektyw 2013
- "Absent Minded", a season 3 episode of The Loud House
