= Bar Room Preacher =

Studio album by Jimmy Johnson
- Released: 1985
- Recorded: November 1983
- Genre: Blues, Chicago blues
- Label: Alligator
- Producer: Disques Black and Blue

Jimmy Johnson chronology
North/South (1982)	Bar Room Preacher (1985)	I'm a Jockey (1984)

Bar Room Preacher is an album by the American musician Jimmy Johnson, released in 1985. It was first released in France under the title Heap See. Johnson supported the album with a North American tour.

== Production ==
Recorded in Paris, the album was produced by Disques Black and Blue. Johnson wrote three of its songs. "Chicken Heads" is a cover of the Mighty Joe Young song. "Cold, Cold Feeling" is a version of the T-Bone Walker song. "You Don't Know What Love Is" was written by Fenton Robinson.

== Critical reception ==
Professional ratings
Review scores
Source	Rating
All Music Guide to the Blues	5/5 stars
The Encyclopedia of Popular Music	3/5 stars
Houston Chronicle	4/5 stars
Lincoln Journal Star	3.5/5 stars
MusicHound Blues: The Essential Album Guide	4/5 stars
The Penguin Guide to Blues Recordings	3/4 stars
The Rolling Stone Jazz & Blues Album Guide	4/5 stars
Valley Advocate	3/5 stars

The Chicago Tribune called the album "good, ol' fashioned, head hangin' Chicago blues". The Whig-Standard said that "Johnson's voice, his chief strength, has the timbre of a young B.B. King's, although it's more expressive; it's at its best on such slow numbers ... Johnson captures painful sentiments without wimping out". The Los Angeles Times praised his "stinging guitar and distinctive, high-pitched vocals".

The Winnipeg Sun called the album "a mix of classic gutbucket blues and multi-influenced originals". The Houston Post appreciated that Johnson was one of the few blues musicians who excelled at both singing and playing guitar, with one skill not outshining the other. The Reno Gazette-Journal stated that Johnson "has a clean, warm tone and he swings and soars across the bar lines like a jazz horn player".

== Track listing ==
No.	Title	Length
1.	"You Don't Know What Love Is"
2.	"Little by Little"
3.	"When My First Wife Quit Me"
4.	"Chicken Heads"
5.	"I Have the Same Old Blues"
6.	"Cold, Cold Feeling"
7.	"Happy Home"
8.	"Heap See"
9.	"Missing Link"
