= Mike Wheeler (musician) =

American singer-songwriter

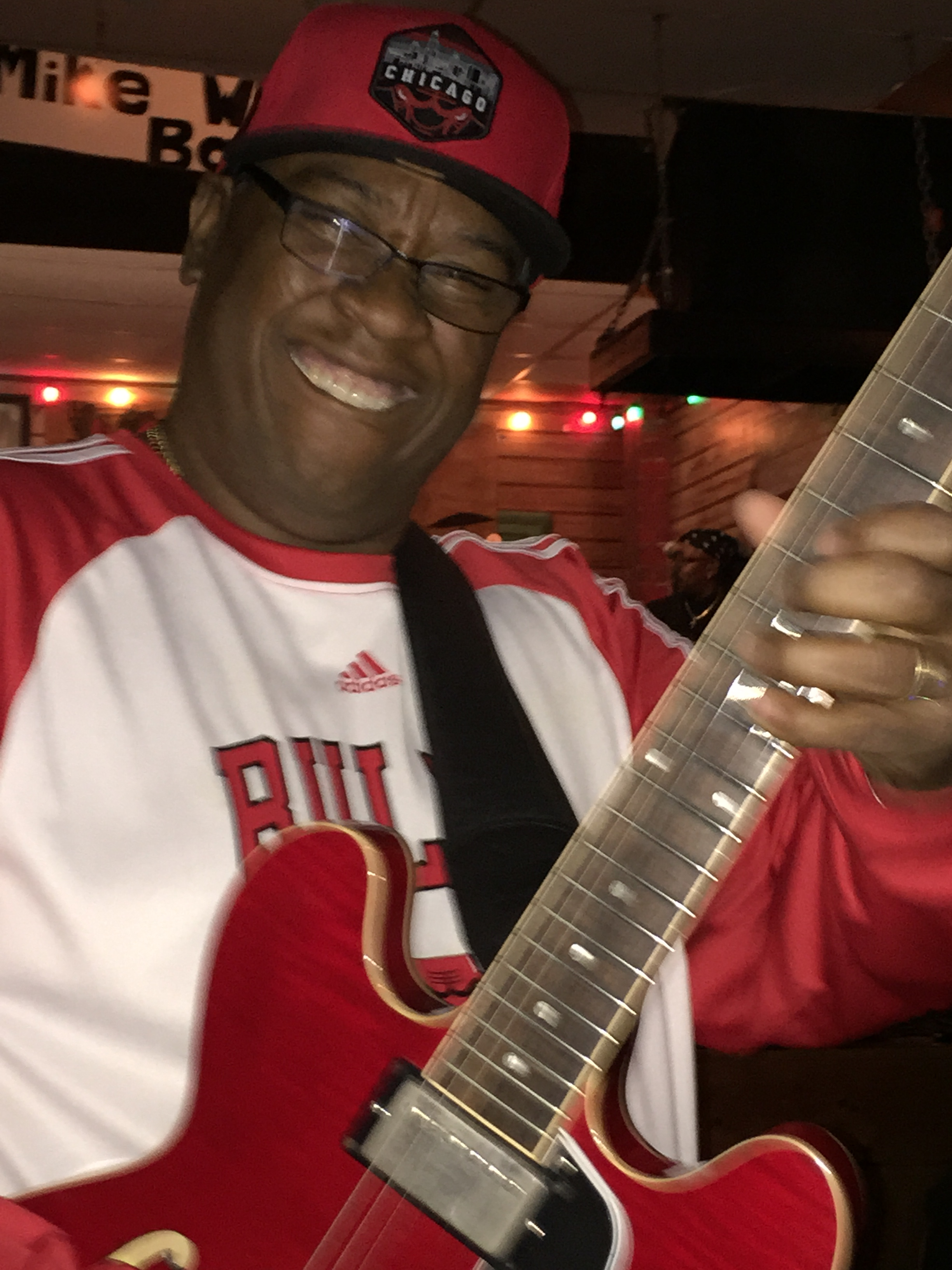
- Wheeler at Kingston Mines 2015

Background information
- Born: Michael Lewis Wheeler; June 30, 1961 (age 65); Chicago, Illinois, United States
- Genres: Chicago blues, electric blues
- Occupations: Musician, songwriter
- Instruments: Guitar, vocals
- Years active: 1984–present
- Label: Delmark
- Website: www.mikewheelerband.com

Michael Lewis Wheeler (born June 30, 1961) is a Chicago blues songwriter, vocalist, and guitarist. His first gig was with Muddy Waters' piano player, Lovie Lee. He performed with numerous Chicago bands and well-known artists such as Koko Taylor, Buddy Guy, and Shemekia Copeland. He formed his own band, the Mike Wheeler Band, in 2001.His CD, Self Made Man, was released by Delmark Records in 2012 with critical acclaim. He was inducted into the Chicago Blues Hall of Fame in 2014. He is a regular performer at the famed Chicago blues club, Kingston Mines.

== Life and career ==
Wheeler (Michael Lewis Wheeler) was born in Chicago, Illinois on June 30, 1961. His music career spans more than 30 years. He played his first gig in 1984 with Muddy Waters' piano player, Lovie Lee, at Lilly's, a Lincoln Park bar in Chicago. His mother was his first musical influence by playing blues (such as Muddy Waters and B.B. King), R&B, and soul records in their home. He recorded and played on numerous Chicago blues bands including Dave Cadillac and the Chicago Redhots, Sam Cockrell and the Grooves, Nellie Tiger Travis, Big Ray and Chicago's Most Wanted, Big James and The Chicago Playboys, and Peaches Staten and the Grooveshakers. He performed with well-known blues artists such as Koko Taylor, Buddy Guy, Shemekia Copeland, Jimmy Johnson, Son Seals, and Willie Kent. He tours in Europe and he has played at the Chicago Blues Festival. In 2014, he was inducted into the Chicago Blues Halls of Fame as a Master Blues Artist. He is a regular performer at the famed Chicago blues club, Kingston Mines.

Wheeler formed his own band in 2001, the Mike Wheeler Band. The band has all of its original members. Bassist Larry Williams was a childhood friend of Wheeler. He has played to national and international audiences. He is known for his stage presence and charisma. Drummer Cleo Cole started playing drums at the age of 10, studied at the Music Conservatory of Chicago, and has performed before international audiences. Keyboardist Brian James has an associate degree in Fine Arts. He was the music director for numerous artists, including Lonnie Brooks.

== Music and performance style ==
Reviewer Read noted that Wheeler has a recognizable sound that includes funk and jazz while telling stories and maintaining a positive attitude and uplifting energy in his music. Critic Cummings-Yeates wrote, "Wheeler possesses the perfect blend of musicianship, storytelling, and singing skills." Chicago Reader critic Whiteis described Wheeler's guitar playing as a "typical Chicagoan blend of Texas-to-Memphis panache and back-alley aggression." Blues critic Al Hensley found that Wheeler's "red-hot" guitar style is "reminiscent" of Carl Weathersby, Jimmy Johnson and Eddie Hazel. Hensley stated of the 12 songs that Wheeler wrote on the CD, Self Made Man, that he has "extraordinary talent as a songwriter".

== Discography ==
Album	Artist	Label	Notes
Checking on My Baby	Cadillac Dave & The Chicago Redhots	Funky Blues, Inc.	Includes Mike Wheeler on guitar
I.m in the Business	Sam Cockrell and the Groove	Boom Boom Records, MAD Records	1999 - includes Mike Wheeler on guitar
Right Here Right Now	Big James and the Chicago Playboys	Blind Pig Records	2009 - includes Mike Wheeler on guitar
Peaches Live at Legends	Peaches Staten	Swississippi Records	2010 - Mike Wheeler on guitar
The Big Payback	Big James and the Chicago Playboys	Blind Pig Records	2011 - includes Mike Wheeler on guitar
Mike Wheeler Band	Mike Wheeler	Chilla Records	2003
Self Made Man	Mike Wheeler	Delmark Records	2012
Turn Up !!	Mike Wheeler Band	Delmark Records	2016
