= Ewart Abner =

American record company executive (1923–1997)

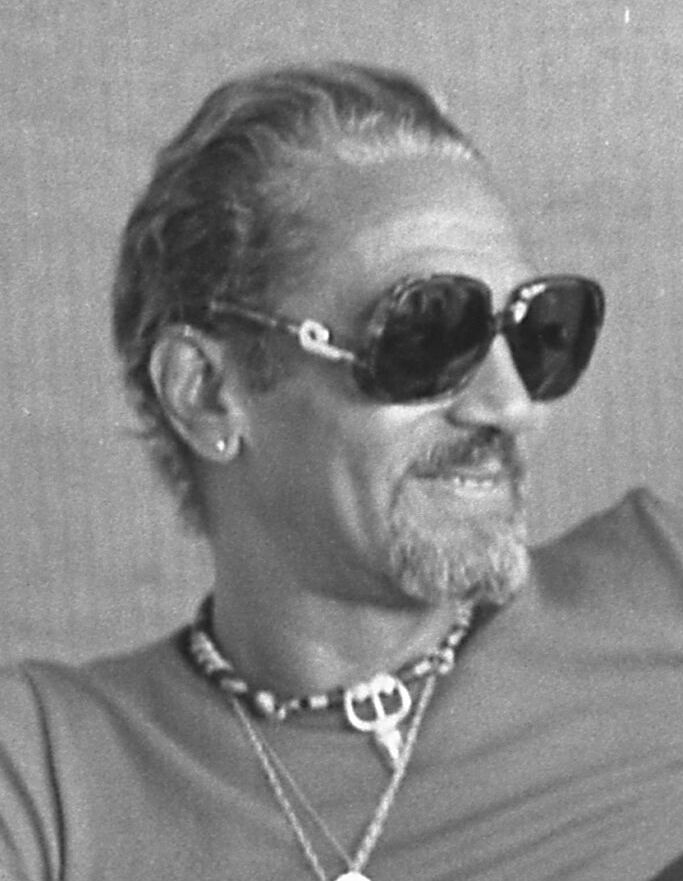
- Abner in 1975

Background information
- Born: Ewart Gladstone Abner, Jr. May 11, 1923; Chicago, Illinois, US
- Died: December 27, 1997 (aged 74) Los Angeles, California, US
- Occupation: Record executive
- Years active: 1955–1997

Ewart Gladstone Abner, Jr. (May 11, 1923 – December 27, 1997) was a major American record company executive who was President of Motown Records from 1973 to 1975 and was personal and business manager for Stevie Wonder for 10 years. In his executive roles at Motown, he helped direct careers for Marvin Gaye, Smokey Robinson and the Miracles, The Temptations, and the Jackson 5.

== Career ==
Ewart Abner, the son of a minister, was born in Chicago and graduated from Englewood High School in 1939. He went to Howard University and studied pharmacy but dropped out and served in the military. After the war, he obtained a degree in accounting from DePaul University in 1949. Between 1950 and 1954, at Chance Records he was in charge of finances.

=== Vee-Jay Records ===
In 1954, Abner became part owner and general manager of Vee-Jay Records. He was appointed president of Vee-Jay in 1961 and with the addition of artists such as Jerry Butler, the Four Seasons, Gene Chandler, Holly Maxwell, Dee Clark, Betty Everett, John Lee Hooker, and Jimmy Reed, the company continued to grow as a major independent. According to The New York Times, “Mr. Abner also oversaw the first American releases of recordings by the Beatles. Although the group was recording for EMI in England, EMI's American affiliate, Capitol, had turned down its first releases. Vee Jay signed the group for American distribution in January 1963, and released a handful of singles and an album, 'Introducing the Beatles.' All the material Vee Jay released was later reissued by Capitol.” The Los Angeles Times reports that "In addition to releasing the Beatles' first U.S. record, [Abner] developed such artists as the Four Seasons, the Impressions and Jimmy Reed."

Abner left Vee-Jay Records after having a “business disagreement” with his partners. Meanwhile, Abner formed Constellation Records in August 1963 with partners Art Sheridan and Bill "Bunky" Sheppard. Constellation experienced its most notable success with Gene Chandler.

=== Motown years ===
Abner was hired by Berry Gordy to be vice-president of International Management at Motown in 1967. He was President of Motown from 1973 to 1975. In both of these roles, he helped “manage the careers of the Supremes, the Temptations, Smokey Robinson and the Miracles, the Four Tops, Marvin Gaye, Stevie Wonder and the Jackson Five,” according to The New York Times. While President of Motown, in 1973 the company reached No. 1 with the singles “Superstition” and “You Are the Sunshine of My Life” (Stevie Wonder), “Touch Me in the Morning” (Diana Ross), “Let’s Get It On” (Marvin Gaye), and “Keep on Truckin’” (Eddie Kendricks).

After leaving Motown, he was personal and business manager for Stevie Wonder for a decade. In that role, he played a major part in many of the efforts to establish a Martin Luther King Jr. national holiday. He was given the NAACP Image Award and was inducted into the Music and Entertainment Hall of Fame. He remained close to Berry Gordy and was an advisor to him until his death. He also was vice chairman of the Motown Historical Museum in Detroit.

== Death ==
Abner died on December 27, 1997, in Los Angeles, California. He was 74, and was survived by his wife, Olivia Watson Abner, and seven children, two grandsons and one great-granddaughter.
