= Karen Carroll =

American blues singer (1958–2016)

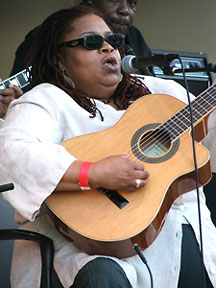
Karen Carroll performing at the 2008 Chicago Blues Festival

Karen Lynn Carroll (January 30, 1958 – March 9, 2016) was an American blues singer. She was born to Mack Carroll and Alberta Simmons Carroll (stage name Jeanne Carroll).

Her godparents were the jazz guitarist George Freeman and the blues vocalist Bonnie Lee.

== Biography ==
Born in Chicago, Carroll started singing in church at the age of six. In her first appearance on stage, she played guitar with her mother's band at age 14. Early in her career she worked with Katie Webster and Albert King.

She recorded her first song with Carey Bell on his album Son of a Gun in 1983. Carroll went on to tour with Professor Eddie Lusk in Canada after performing on his album Professor Strut in 1989. She went on to play in prominent Chicago blues clubs. In 1995, she contributed to an album with five other female blues artists, entitled Women of Blue Chicago; which is still played on the radio today.

She was offered a recording contract by Delmark Records in 1995, subsequently making the album Had My Fun. This was followed by another album, Talk to the Hand, in 1997. She wrote and held copyright to some of the tracks on this album.

She worked with many Chicago blues musicians, including Carey and Lurrie Bell, Rudy Rotta, Otis Grand, Angela Brown, Billy Branch, Melvin Taylor, Eddy Clearwater, Lonnie Brooks, Alvin Lee, Byther Smith and Sugar Blue. Her album Be My Guest! was released by Indigoteam Records in 2008.

The BBC Radio 2 blues programme, the "Paul Jones Show", played several of her tracks by way of an obituary during the 28 March 2016 edition. Carroll died on March 9, 2016, in Georgia, at the age of 58 after several long illnesses.

== Solo discography ==
- Had My Fun (Delmark, 1995)
- Talk to the Hand (Delmark, 1997)
- Live in Oleśnica (Stowarzyszenie Jazz Kanapie, 2007)
- Be My Guest! (Indigoteam, 2008)
- Evolution Revolution (Gryllus, 2009)
- Ghetto Love (unsigned, 2010)
- Karen Carroll's Blues Mix (unsigned, 2011)

== Collaboration with other artists ==
- Son of a Gun (P-Vine, 1984)
- Professor Strut (Delmark, 1989)
- Gospel (Hot-Foks, 1990)
- Stock Yards Strut (Delmark, 1993)
- Chicago's Finest Blues Ladies (Wolf, 1993)
- Johnny B. Moore, Live at Blue Chicago (Blue Chicago, 1994)
- Red Hot Mamas (Blue Chicago, 1997)
- Delmark Records 45 Years of Jazz and Blues (Delmark, 1998)
- Delmark 50th Anniversary CD Collection (Delmark, 2003)
- Wild About That Thing: Ladies Sing the Blues (Delmark, 2003)
- First Class Blues (feat. Karen Carroll, Big Jay McNeely) (Acoustic Music Records, 2011)
