= Delmark Records =

American record label

- Genre: Jazz, blues
- Founded: 1953
- Founder: Bob Koester
- Headquarters: Chicago, Illinois
- Number of locations: United States
- Website: www.delmark.com

Delmark Records is an American jazz and blues independent record label. The label originated in 1953 in St. Louis, Missouri, as Delmar, when owner, and founder, Bob Koester released a recording of the Windy City Six, a traditional jazz group, under the Delmar imprint. Koester and the label moved to Chicago, Illinois, in 1958, and the label's name became Delmark. Koester sold the label assets in 2018, and the label since operates as Delmark Records LLC.

== History ==
Born in 1932 in Wichita, Kansas, Bob Koester was the son of a petroleum engineer. While in the hospital with polio when he was a child, he listened to the radio and was cheered up when he heard Eddie Condon and Benny Goodman. In his teens, he was a dedicated jazz fan who began buying old records from a Salvation Army store. At concerts in Kansas City, he heard Red Allen, Count Basie, Jimmy Rushing, Tommy Douglas, Lionel Hampton, and Jay McShann.

Moving from Wichita to St. Louis to attend college, Koester began his career as a record trader in his dormitory room. Joining a local jazz club gave Koester his first taste of live jazz, seeing Clark Terry perform. Koester made acquaintance with a fellow jazz club member, Ron Fister, with whom he opened his first record shop, K & F Sales. Shortly after opening in an old restaurant storefront, they changed the name to the Blue Note Record Shop. About a year after this joint venture, Fister and Koester decided to part ways, with Koester moving to the corner of Delmar and Olive streets in St. Louis. Taking the name from the street his shop was on, Koester recorded a local jazz group the Windy City Six in 1953. Shortly thereafter, Koester found local talent such as James Crutchfield, Speckled Red, J.D. Short, and Big Joe Williams.

Koester moved to Chicago in August 1958. He bought Seymour's Jazz Mart, and in renaming the storefront the Jazz Record Mart, Delmark Records found its new home in the basement of the record shop. By 1963, Koester had moved the shop to a location at 7 West Grand. During this period in Chicago, Delmark released albums by, Barney Bigard, Donald Byrd, Jimmy Forrest, George Lewis, Bud Powell, and Ira Sullivan.

Throughout the 1960s and 1970s, Delmark recorded the Art Ensemble of Chicago, Sonny Stitt, Junior Wells, Luther Allison, Arthur Crudup, Jimmy Dawkins, Sleepy John Estes, Buddy Guy, J. B. Hutto, Jimmy Johnson, Magic Sam, Robert Nighthawk, Yank Rachell, Otis Rush, Roosevelt Sykes, and Malachi Thompson.

In 1966, Chuck Nessa, manager of the Jazz Record Mart, convinced Koester to release albums by musicians associated with the Association for the Advancement of Creative Musicians. The first record was Roscoe Mitchell's Sound (1966) which received a five star review in Downbeat. This was followed by Muhal Richard Abrams' Levels and Degrees of Light (1968), Kalaparusha Maurice McIntyre's Humility in the Light of the Creator (1969) and Anthony Braxton's For Alto (1969). Delmark released two of the earliest Sun Ra albums, Sun Song and Sound of Joy, in 1967 and 1968 respectively.

Delmark has also released albums by Fred Anderson, Frank Catalano, Rob Mazurek, Nicole Mitchell, Ken Vandermark, Roy Campbell, Jr., and Ethnic Heritage Ensemble; and blues musicians including Zora Young, Ken Saydak, Byther Smith, Michael Coleman, Little Arthur Duncan, Eddie C. Campbell, Jimmy Burns, and ragtime musicians including Terry Waldo.

In March 2010, Delmark announced the release of the album Revisit by the Polish duo Mikrokolektyw. This album was Delmark's first by a European avant-garde jazz group in its 57-year history. In 2012, Delmark released two Chicago blues albums by Linsey Alexander and Mike Wheeler.

In May 2018, Koester retired and sold Delmark Records to Delmark Records LLC, of which Julia A. Miller is the Managing Member. Julia A. Miller became the label President & CEO and Elbio Barilari became the Vice President & Artistic Director. They are two musicians from Chicago and Uruguay, respectively. The sale included Delmark's subsidiary labels, CD and LP inventory, the catalog of masters, and Riverside Studio.

== Discography ==
=== Jazz ===
Delmark Records began releasing 12 inch LP jazz albums sporadically from 1959 commencing with the 400 series and continuing with the 500 series in 1998.

Catalog No.	Album	Artist	Details
401	The Bob Graf Sessions	Bob Graf	also released as At Winchester
402	Blue Stroll	Ira Sullivan	
403	The John Young Trio	John Young	also released as Serenata
404	All the Gin Is Gone	Jimmy Forrest	recorded 1959
406	Bouncing with Bud	Bud Powell	
407	Yusef!	Yusef Lateef	reissue of 1956 Transisition LP also released as First Flight by Donald Byrd
408	Sound	Roscoe Mitchell	
409	Archie Shepp in Europe	Archie Shepp with the New York Contemporary Five	partial reissue of 1964 Sonet double LP
410	Song For	Joseph Jarman	
411	Sun Song	Sun Ra	reissue of 1957 Transition LP
413	Levels and Degrees of Light	Muhal Richard Abrams	
414	Sound of Joy	Sun Ra	
415	Three Compositions of New Jazz	Anthony Braxton	
416	I Remember Newport	Leon Sash	
417	As If It Were the Seasons	Joseph Jarman	
418	Celebration for Modern Man	Kent Schneider	
419	Humility in the Light of the Creator	Maurice McIntyre	
420/21	For Alto	Anthony Braxton	Double LP
422	Nicky's Tune	Ira Sullivan	
423	Young at Heart/Wise in Time	Muhal Richard Abrams	
424	Birth Sign	George Freeman	
425	Forces and Feelings	Kalaparushna Maurice McIntyre	
426	Made for Each Other	Sonny Stitt and Don Patterson	
427	Black Forrest	Jimmy Forrest	recorded 1959
428	Together Alone	Joseph Jarman and Anthony Braxton	
429	Because of You	Tab Smith	
430	Things to Come from Those Now Gone	Muhal Richard Abrams	
431	Bad Bascomb	Paul Bascomb	
432/33	Live at Mandel Hall	Art Ensemble of Chicago	Double LP
434	Somebody Done Stole My Blues	Chris Woods	
435	Night Train	Jimmy Forrest	
436	Reality	Frank Walton	
437	Modus Operandi	Chris Woods	
438	Honkers And Bar Walkers 1	Various Artists	
439	Big Band Jazz: Tulsa to Harlem	Various Artists	
440	Shock of the New	Brad Goode	
441	Last Trio Session	Wynton Kelly	
442	Spirit	Malachi Thompson	
443	After Hours Joint	Jimmy Coe	
444	Unit 7	Mike Smith	
445	Upward Spiral	Edward Petersen	
446	Tough Town	Jim Cooper	
447	Jump Time	Tab Smith	
448	On a Cool Night	Mike Smith	
449	Delayed Exposure	Lin Halliday	
450	Takin' Off	Sir Charles Thompson	
451	Mellow Mama	Dinah Washington	compilation of 1947 Apollo recordings
452	Honkers and Bar Walkers 2	Various Artists	
453	The Jaz Life	Malachi Thompson	
454	Experience	Jodie Christian	
455	Ace High	Tab Smith	
456	New Kingdom	Roy Campbell	
457	Nutville	Jim Cooper	
458	East of the Sun	Lin Halliday	
459	Rainbow Mist	Coleman Hawkins	compilation of 1944 Apollo recordings
460	Call of the Gators	Willis Jackson	compilation of 1949-50 Apollo recordings
461	Straight Up	Eric Alexander	
462	The Traveler	Mike Smith	
463	Lift Every Voice	Malachi Thompson	
464	Brass Knuckles	Zane Massey	
465	Swingtet Live at Andy's	Chuck Hedges	
466	Renaissance of the Resistance	Kahil El'Zabar Ritual Trio	
467	Rain or Shine	Jodie Christian	
468	Where or When	Lin Halliday	
469	La Tierra del Fuego	Roy Campbell	
470	And the Duke's Men	Earl Hines	compilation of 1944/47 Apollo recordings
471	Arnett Blows for 1300	Arnett Cobb	compilation of 1947 Apollo recordings
472	How D'You Like It So Far?	Barrett Deems	
473	New Standards	Malachi Thompson	
474	Haint	Edward Petersen	
475	Hey Donald	Roscoe Mitchell	
476	Up, Over & Out	Eric Alexander	
477	Big Cliff	Kahil El'Zabar Ritual Trio with special guest Billy Bang	
478	Cerupa	Cecil Payne	
479	Portrait in the Mist	Andrew Lamb	
480	Sinatra Song Book	Mike Smith	
481	Buddy Bolden's Rag	Malachi Thompson and Africa Brass featuring Lester Bowie	
482	Horns Aplenty	Betty O'Hara	
483	Skylark	Chuck Hedges and Johnny Varro	
484	That's for Sure!	Bobby Smith	
485	This Is My House	NRG Ensemble	
486	Ultimate Frontier	Ari Brown	
487	Safe to Imagine	Zane Massey	
488	Stablemates	Eric Alexander and Lin Halliday	
489	Just Found Joy	The Rich Corpolongo Quartet plus Two	
490	Front Line	Jodie Christian	
491	Warrior	Carl Leukaufe	
492	Deemus	Barrett Deems	
493	Sound Songs	Roscoe Mitchell	
494	Scotch and Milk	Cecil Payne	
495	Motherless Child	Andy Goodrich	
496	The Continuum	Ethnic Heritage Ensemble	
497	47th Street	Malachi Thompson	
498	Soul Fountain	Jodie Christian	
499	Top and Bottom	Tab Smith	
500	Mode for Mabes	Eric Alexander	
501	Cut It Out	Frank Catalano	
502	Smiles	Rich Corpolongo	
503	Playground	Rob Mazurek Chicago Underground Orchestra	
504	Venus	Ari Brown	
505	Groovin' Hard	Barrett Deems Big Band	
506	Freebop Now!	Malachi Thompson	
507	Return of the Lost Tribe	Bright Moments	collaborative project by Joseph Jarman, Kalaparusha Maurice McIntyre, Kahil El'Zabar, Malachi Favors and Adegoke Steve Colson
508	Von & Ed	Von Freeman and Ed Petersen	
509	Payne's Window	Cecil Payne	
510	In Walked Buckner	The Roscoe Mitchell Quartet	
511	Possible Cube	Chicago Underground Trio	
512	The Song Bird	Francine Griffin	
513	Heretic Blues	Kevin O'Donnell's Quality Six	
514	Conversations	Archie Shepp and Kahil El'Zabar's Ritual Trio	
515	Love You Madly	Eddie Johnson	
516	Design in Time	Ken Vandermark's Sound in Action Trio	
517	Freedom Jazz Dance	Ethnic Heritage Ensemble	
518	Rising Daystar	Malachi Thompson	
519	Africa N'Da Blues	Kahil El'Zabar Ritual Trio	
521	Flamethrower	Chicago Underground Trio	
522	Control Freak	Kevin O'Donnell's Quality Six	
523	Airegin	Lin Halliday	
524	Jo'burg Jump	Ernest Dawkins' New Horizons Ensemble	
525	You Talkin' to Me?!	Von Freeman and Frank Catalano	
526	Robbins' Nest: Live at the Jazz Showcase	Sir Charles Thompson	
528	Ethnic Stew and Brew	Roy Campbell	
529	Chic Boom: Live at the Jazz Showcase	Cecil Payne	
530	Modern Man	Bobby Broom	
531	Reminiscing	Jodie Christian Trio	
532	Talking Horns	Malachi Thompson	
533	Spirits Entering	Kahil El'Zabar and Billy Bang	
534	On the Run, Live at the Velvet Lounge	Fred Anderson	
535	At the Party	Earl Hines	recorded 1970
536	Live at the Green Mill	Frank Catalano	
537	I've Got Rhythm: Live at the Jazz Showcase	Sir Charles Thompson	
538	Jumpin' at Apollo	Illinois Jacquet	compilation of tracks recorded for Apollo between 1945 and 1948
539	Mister Lucky	Al Green and Othello Anderson	
540	Silver Spines	Rob Mazurek	
541	Love Outside of Dreams	Kahil El'Zabar Trio	
542	Honkers & Bar Walkers Volume Three	Various Artists	
543	Like-Coping	Jeff Parker	
544	Four Compositions (GTM) 2000	Anthony Braxton	
545	Cape Town Shuffle	Ernest Dawkins' New Horizons Ensemble	
546	Cipher	Josh Abrams	
547	Titration	Active Ingredients	
548	Blue Jazz	Malachi Thompson and Africa Brass with Gary Bartz and Billy Harper	
549	Back at the Velvet Lounge	Fred Anderson	
550	Up Jumped Spring	Curtis Fuller	
551	Breeding Resistance	Ted Sirota's Rebel Souls	
552	Tribute to Hamp	Duane Thamm and the Chuck Hedges Swingtet	
553	Morning Song	Kalaparush and the Light	
554	Yes Indeed! Women Vocalists on United	Various Artists	
555	Crazy Walk	Tab Smith	recorded for United Records in the 1950s
556	Deep Blue Bruise	Deep Blue Organ Trio	
557	We Is	Kahil El'Zabar and David Murray	
558	Song Songs Song	Jeff Parker and Scott Fields	
559	Mean Ameen	Ernest Dawkins' New Horizons Ensemble	
560	More Questions Than Answers	Jim Baker	
561	Several Lights	Chicago Luzern Exchange	
562	Running Out of Time	SavoirFaire	
563	It's Magic	Sonny Stitt	
564	High Voltage	Common Ground	
565	Blues for Hawk	Yves Francois	recorded between 1981 and 1986 and originally released on the Pinnacle label
566	Live at the River East Art Center	Kahil El'Zabar Ritual Trio with Billy Bang	
567	Hypnotic Suggestion	Brad Goode	
568	Timeless, Live at the Velvet Lounge	Fred Anderson	
569	Goin' to Town: Live at the Green Mill	Deep Blue Organ Trio	
570	The Messenger	Ernest Dawkins' New Horizons Ensemble	
571	Ready Everyday	Keefe Jackson's Fast Citizens	
572	Big M: A Tribute to Malachi Favors	Kahil El'Zabar Ritual Trio featuring Billy Bang	
573	Chronicle	Chicago Underground Trio	
574	Hot 'n' Heavy	Ethnic Heritage Ensemble	
575	Black Unstoppable	Nicole Mitchell's Black Earth Ensemble	
576	Transmigration	Kahil El'Zabar's Infinity Orchestra	
577	Live at the Green Mill	Ari Brown	
578	Nature Boy	Brad Goode	
579	Doctor Midnight	Sabertooth	
580	Just Like This	Keefe Jackson's Project Project	
581	The Art of Dying	Jason Ajemian	
582	Drop It	Corey Wilkes	
583	Tickle Toe	Cy Touff and Sandy Mosse	Recorded in Chicago in October 1981
584	West of State Street / East of Harlem'	John Burnett Swing Orchestra	
585	Go Red Go!	Red Holloway	
586	Sound Is	Rob Mazurek Quintet	
587	Renegades	Nicole Mitchell's Black Earth Strings	
588	Old Idea	Josh Berman	
589	21st Century Chase	Fred Anderson	
590	Two Cities	Aram Shelton's Fast Citizens	
591	Revisit	Mikrokolektyw	
592	Get Happy	Rich Corpolongo Trio	
593	Tight Like This	Brad Goode	
595	Stars Have Shapes	Exploding Star Orchestra	
596	Down for Double	John Burnett Orchestra with special guest Buddy DeFranco	
597	Dew Point	Mikrokolektyw	
598	The Prairie Prophet	Ernest Dawkins' New Horizons Ensemble	
599	Awakening	Nicole Mitchell	

=== 2000 Series ===
Delmark Records 2000 series consisted of eight CD releases between 2011 and 2012 when Delmark commenced the 5000 series.

Catalog No.	Album	Artist	Details
2011	Double Demon	Starlicker	Rob Mazurek, Jason Adasiewicz, John Herndon
2012	Spacer	Jason Adasiewicz's Sun Rooms	
2013	The Story This Time	Jason Stein	
2014	Explosion!	Jim Holman	
2015	Bright Light in Winter	Jeff Parker	
2016	There Now	Josh Berman & His Gang	
2017	Gather	Fred Lonberg-Holm's Fast Citizens	
2018	Stellar Pulsations	Rob Mazurek Pulsar Quartet	

=== 5000 Series ===
Delmark Records 5000 series follows the 2000 series as the main series of Delmark jazz albums from 2012 onwards.

Catalog No.	Album	Artist	Details
5001	Afro Straight	Ernest Dawkins	
5002	What It Is!	Kahil El'Zabar Quartet	
5003	Absent Minded	Mikrokolektyw	
5004	Aquarius	Nicole Mitchell's Ice Crystals	
5005	Cicada Music	Frank Rosaly	
5007	The Space Between	Rob Mazurek Exploding Star Electro Acousic Ensemble	
5008	Heavy Artillery	Howard Alden / Andy Brown Quartet	
5009	A Round Goal	Keefe Jackson's Likely So	
5010	Blue Skies	Ira Sullivan presents the Jim Holman Trio featuring Roger Humphries	
5011	Groove Awakening	Ari Brown	
5012	Trance Hypothesis	Fareed Haque	
5013	Follow the Sun	Kahil El'Zabar's Ritural Trio	
5014	High Red Center	Jason Roebke Octet	
5015	Force Majeure	Paul Giallorenzo's GitGO	
5016	Folklords	Jason Ajemian	
5017	From the Region	Jason Adasiewicz's Sun Rooms	
5018	In the Wee Small Hours	Sax Gordon	
5019	Soloist	Andy Brown	
5020	The Time Inside a Year	Dave McDonnell Group	
5021	A Dance and a Hop	Josh Berman	
5022	Invitation	Larry Novak Trio	
5023	Direct Call	Andy Brown	
5024	Rows and Rows	Keefe Jackson and Jason Adasiewicz	
5025	Lucille!	Jason Stein Quartet	
5026	Flow	Paul Giallorenzo Trio with Joshua Abrams	
5027	Yes, and... Music for Nine Improvisors	Geof Bradfield	
5028	Paquito Libre	Volcano Radar featuring Paquito D’Rivera	
5029	New Latin American Music for Guitar And String Quartet	Fareed Haque and KAIA String Quartet	
5030	Soulful Days	Soul Message Band	
5031	Ephemeral Certainties	Javier Red’s Imagery Converter	
5032	It’s Too Hot for Words	Metropolitan Jazz Octet featuring Dee Alexander	

=== Blues ===
Delmark Records began releasing 12 inch LP blues albums in 1961 with the 600 series which continued through the 800s by 2008.

Catalog No.	Album	Artist	Details
601	The Dirty Dozens	Speckled Red	
602	Piney Woods Blues	Big Joe Williams	
603	Legend	Sleepy John Estes	
604	Blues on Highway 49	Big Joe Williams	
605	Lonesome Bedroom Blues	Curtis Jones	
606	Mandolin Blues	Yank Rachell and his Tennessee Jug-Busters	
607	Hard Drivin' Blues	Roosevelt Sykes with Homesick James	
608	Broke and Hungry (Ragged and Dirty, Too)	Sleepy John Estes	
609	Stavin' Chain Blues	Big Joe Williams and J.D. Short	
611	Sleepy John Estes in Europe	Sleepy John Estes	
612	Hoodoo Man Blues	Junior Wells	
613	Brownsville Blues	Sleepy John Estes	
614	Look on Yonder's Wall	Arthur "Big Boy" Crudup	
615	West Side Soul	Magic Sam Blues Band	
616	Roosevelt Sykes in Europe Solo	Roosevelt Sykes	
617	Hawk Squat	J. B. Hutto and the Hawks with Sunnyland Slim	
618	Sweet Home Chicago	Various Artists	
619	Electric Sleep	Sleepy John Estes	
620	Black Magic	Magic Sam Blues Band	
621	Crudup's Mood	Arthur "Big Boy" Crudup	
622	Carey Bell's Blues Harp	Carey Bell	
623	Fast Fingers	Jimmy Dawkins	
624	Chicago Ain't Nothing But a Blues Band	Various Artists	
625	Love Me Mama	Luther Allison	
626	Blues Piano Orgy	Various Artists	
627	Nine String Guitar Blues	Big Joe Williams	
628	Southside Blues Jam	Junior Wells with Buddy Guy and Otis Spann	
629	Blues with a Touch of Soul	Mighty Joe Young	
630	Steady Rollin' Man	Robert Lockwood Jr.	
631	Kidney Stew is Fine	Eddie "Cleanhead" Vinson	
632	Feel Like Blowing My Horn	Roosevelt Sykes	
633	I Want a Little Girl	T-Bone Walker	
634	All for Business	Jimmy Dawkins	
635	On Tap	Junior Wells	
636	Slidewinder	J.B. Hutto	
637	He May Be Your Man (But He Comes to See Me Sometimes)	Edith Wilson	
638	Cold Day in Hell	Otis Rush	
639	Newport Blues	Sleepy John Estes	
640	Blues Hit Big Town	Junior Wells	
641	Blisterstring	Jimmy Dawkins	
642	Raining in My Heart	Roosevelt Sykes	
643	So Many Roads: Live in Japan	Otis Rush	
644	Johnson's Whacks	Jimmy Johnson	
645/646	Magic Sam Live	Magic Sam	2-LP set of recordings from Chicago in 1963/64 and from the Ann Arbor Blues Festival in 1969
647	North/South	Jimmy Johnson	
648	The Blues World of Little Walter	Various Artists	
649	Chicago Style	Yank Rachell	
650	Professor Strut	Professor's Blues Revue with Karen Carroll	
651	The Magic Sam Legacy	Magic Sam	
652	Bluebird Blues	Dave Specter and Barkin' Bill Smith	
653	Ain't It Nice	Willie Kent	
654	Give Me Time	Magic Sam	collection of 1968 home recordings
655	House Rent Party	Sunnyland Slim featuring Jimmy Rogers, Willie Mabon and St. Louis Jimmy	compilation of 1949 Apollo recordings
656	Central Avenue Boogie	Pete Johnson	compilation of 1947 Apollo recordings
657	West Coast Jive	Various Artists	compilation of 1946-47 Apollo recordings by Cee Pee Johnson, Duke Henderson, Lucky Thompson, Al "Stomp" Russell, Frank Haywood and Wynonie Harris
658	Fortune Tellin' Man	Jesse Fortune and Dave Specter	
659	Lay It on 'em Girls	Big Time Sarah and the BTS Express	
660	Let’s Talk It Over	Lonnie Brooks	
661	Big Wheeler's Bone Orchard	Golden "Big" Wheeler with the Ice Cream Men	
662	The Strongman	Reginald R. Robinson	
663	Goodbye Mr. Blues	Little Brother Montgomery's State Street Swingers	
664	Blueplicity	Dave Specter	
665	Lonely Traveler	Jimmie Lee Robinson	
666	Heartaches and Pain	Carey Bell	
667	Too Hurt to Cry	Willie Kent	
668	Get Your Kicks	Duke Henderson	compilation of 1945 Apollo recordings
669	East Coast Jive	Various Artists	compilation of 1946-47 Apollo recordings by Babs Gonzales, The Four Blues, Artie Simms, Loumell Morgan, Ben Smith and Babe Wallace
670	Sounds in Silhouette	Reginald R. Robinson	
671	Let Your Hair Down!	Floyd McDaniel and the Blues Swingers	
672	Gotcha!	Barkin' Bill Smith	
673	One to Infinity	Tad Robinson	
674	Back in the Game	Syl Johnson with Hi Rhythm	
675	Wild Cards	Al Miller	
676	Sweetheart of the Blues	Bonnie Lee	
677	Live in Europe	Dave Specter and the Bluebirds	
678	Boogie My Blues Away	Eddy Clearwater	
679	Mercurial Son	Lurrie Bell	
680	Had My Fun	Karen Carroll	
681	Live at Westville Prison	Little Milton	
682	I Ain't Lyin'	Little Sammy Davis	
683	Everybody Boogie!	Wynonie Harris	compilation of 1945 Apollo recordings with Illinois Jacquet, Jack McVea and Oscar Pettiford
684	Don't You Feel My Leg	Blu Lu / Wee Bea / Baby Dee	compilation of 1946/50 Apollo recordings
685	Blues Around the Clock	Willie Bryant	
686	Homebrew	Brewer Phillips	
687	Who Put the Benzedrine in Mrs. Murphy's Ovaltine?	Harry "The Hipster" Gibson	
688	Live at Blue Chicago	Johnny B. Moore	
689	Crying for My Baby	Lacy Gibson	
690	Women of Blue Chicago	Various Artists	
691	Mississippi Kid	Byther Smith & The Night Riders	
692	Blues in the Year One-D-One	Big Time Sarah and the BTS Express	
693	Left Turn On Blue	Dave Specter	
694	Leaving Here Walking	Jimmy Burns	
695	Hello World	Aaron Moore	
696	Long Way to Ol' Miss	Willie Kent	
697	Blues Guitar Greats	Various Artists	
698	Can't Stop Now	Eddie Shaw & The Wolf Gang	
699	Blues Before Sunrise Live Vol. 1	Various Artists	
700	700 Blues	Lurrie Bell	
701	Troubled World	Johnny B. Moore	
702	Working the Road: The Golden Age of Chicago Gospel	Various Artists	
703	Chop Chop Boom	Various Artists	The Dandeliers and Other Great Groups on States
704	Mary Joe	The Four Blazes	
705	Boogie Woogie Stomp	Albert Ammons with Meade Lux Lewis and Pete Johnson	
706	West Side Baby	Floyd McDaniel	
707	Talk to the Hand	Karen Carroll	
708	All Night Long	Byther Smith	
709	Jump In	Golden "Big" Wheeler	
710	Memphis Slim U.S.A	Memphis Slim and his House Rockers featuring Matt "Guitar" Murphy	
711	Bricks in My Pillow	Robert Nighthawk	
712	Harmonica Blues Kings	Big Walter Horton and Alfred "Blues King" Harris	
714	Windy City Boogie	J. T. Brown	
715	Jump 'n' Shout!	Various Artists	
716	Wrapped in My Baby	Morris Pejoe / Arthur "Big Boy" Spires	
717	Long Man Blues	Various Artists	
718	Euphonic Sounds	Reginald R. Robinson	
719	Ready!	James Wheeler	
720	Straight Out of Chicago	The Rockin' Johnny Band	
721	Blues Spoken Here	Dave Specter and Lenny Lynn	
722	Last Go Round	Tad Robinson	
723	Make Room for the Blues	Willie Kent	
724	Kiss of Sweet Blues	Lurrie Bell	
725	Foolish Man	Ken Saydak	
726	Junk Food	A.C. Reed	
727	Good Blues to You	Aron Burton	
728	American People	Tail Dragger	
729	Talkin' Bout Chicago!	Syl Johnson	
730	Night Time Again	Jimmy Burns	
731	Boot 'Em Up	Aaron Moore	
732	Man's Temptation	The Rockin' Johnny Band	
733	Singin' with the Sun	Little Arthur Duncan	
734	'C' for Chicago	Steve Freund	
735	Smile on My Face	Sunnyland Slim with Lacy Gibson and Lee Jackson	
736	Blues Had a Baby	Lurrie Bell	
738	The Neglected Professor	Charles Thompson	
739	Biddle Street Barrelhousin'	Various Artists	Speckled Red, Henry Brown, Stump Johnson, James Crutchfield, Lawrence Henry
740	Dr. Feelgood	Piano Red	
741	New Role Soul	Robert Ward	
742	All in the Joy	The Big DooWopper	
743	Can't Take It	James Wheeler	
744	Speculatin'	Dave Specter	
745	Pepper's Hangout	Jimmy Johnson	
746	This Is the Blues Harmonica	Various Artists	
747	Do Your Thing!	Michael Coleman	
748	Learned My Lesson	Zora Young	
749	Blues Is a Feeling	Jesse Thomas	
750	A Million of You	Big Time Sarah	
751	Love Without Trust	The Ken Saydak Band	
752	I'll Be Your Mule	Steve Freund	
753	Joplin's Disciple	Brun Campbell	
754	Hoot & Holler Saturday Night!	Piney Brown / Eddie Mack	compilation of 1948/50 Apollo recordings
755	The Back Porch Boys	Alex "Guitar Slim" Seward and Louis "Jelly Belly" Hayes	compilation of 1947-50 Apollo recordings with Blind Willie McTell, Champion Jack Dupree and Brownie McGhee
756	McVoutie's Central Avenue Blues	Jack McVea	compilation of 1945-46 Apollo recordings with Rabon Tarrant, Wynonie Harris, Wild Bill Moore, Cee Pee Johnson and Duke Henderson
757	Killer Diller	Shirley Johnson	
758	Snake Eyes	Eddie Burns	
759	Bye Bye Baby	Robert McCoy	
760	On the Battlefield... Great Gospel Quartets	Various Artists	
761	Bang Goes My Heeart	Various Artists	The Moroccans and Other Great Groups on United
762	The Come Back	Memphis Slim and his House Rockers with Matt "Guitar" Murphy	
763	I Smell a Rat	Lester Davenport	
764	The Delmark Sessions	Frank Morey	
765	Rockin' Wild in Chicago	Magic Sam	
766	Feel the Spirit: A Tribute to Mahalia	The Big DooWopper	
767	I Got Wild	Big Joe Williams	
768	Switchin' in the Kitchen	Dave Clark's Blues Swingers featuring Floyd McDaniel	
769	Rockin' in the Same Boat	Johnny B. Moore	
770	Back to the Delta	Jimmy Burns	
771	If Heartaches Were Nickels	Charles Wilson	
772	Something Within Me	William Warfield	
773	Chicago Boogie	Roosevelt Sykes	
774	Hold That Train	Byther Smith	
775	The United Records Story	Various Artists	
776	Tell Me	Various Artists	The Five C's and Other Great Groups on United
777	Blues on the Internet	Detroit Junior	
778	Stompin' at Mother Blues	J.B. Hutto	
779	Is What It Is	Dave Specter and Steve Freund	
780	This Is the Blues Harmonica Vol 2	Various Artists	
781	All Your Love I Miss Loving	Otis Rush	
782	My Head Is Bald	Tail Dragger	
783	One Eye Open	Mississippi Heat featuring Lurrie Bell	
784	Tore Up from the Floor Up	Zora Young	
785	Blues Brunch at the Mart	Michael Coleman and the Delmark All-Stars	
786	That Ain't Right	Magic Slim and the Teardrops / Joe Carter with Sunnyland Slim	
787	Live at Theresa's 1975	Junior Wells	
788	Alton Blues	Barrelhouse Buck McFarland	
789	Live at B.L.U.E.S	Jimmy Burns	
790	Street Singer: Born 1875	Cowboy Roy Brown	
791	Gettin' Up Live	Carey Bell and Lurrie Bell	
792	Messin' Around Blues	Jimmy Blythe	
793	Live At Rosa's Blues Lounge	Little Arthur Duncan	
794	Live in Chicago	Dave Specter	
795	Hattiesburg Blues	Mississippi Heat	
796	Blues on the Moon	Byther Smith	
797	On 80 Highway	Sleepy John Estes with Hammie Nixon	
798	Blues Attack	Shirley Johnson	
799	Tear This World Up	Eddie C. Campbell	
800	It Ain't Over: Delmark Celebrates 55 Years of Blues	Various Artists	
801	Hey Jodie!	Quintus McCormick Blues Band	
802	The French Connection	Zora Young	
803	Live at Rooster's Lounge	Tail Dragger	
804	Boogie Woogie Kings	Various Artists	
805	The Life I Love	Willie Buck	
806	Burnin' Love	Dave Weld and the Imperial Flames	
807	Let's Live It Up!	Mississippi Heat	
808	Jimmy Dawkins Presents The Leric Story	Various Artists	
809	Live in Boston 1966	Junior Wells and the Aces	
810	That's the Way You Do	Studebaker John's Maxwell Street Kings	
811	Love You from the Top	James Kinds	
812	Gettin' Kinda Rough!	Graná Louise	
813	Low Down Papa	Clarence Johnson	
814	Bad Girl	Demetria Taylor	
815	Put It On Me!	Quintus McCormick Blues Band	
816	The Real Deal	Sharon Lewis and Texas Fire	
817	Leaving Mood	Toronzo Cannon	
818	Old School Rockin'	Studebaker John	
819	Spider Eating Preacher	Eddie C. Campbell	
820	Grim Reaper	The Rockin' Johnny Band	
821	Still Called the Blues	Quintus McCormick	
822	Been There Done That	Linsey Alexander	
823	Delta Bound	Mississippi Heat	
824	Self Made Man	Mike Wheeler	
825	Cell Phone Man	Willie Buck	
826	...In Between Time	Al Miller Chicago Blues Band	
827	Sunny Road	Arthur "Big Boy" Crudup	
828	Stop Lyin'	Tail Dragger	
829	Blues In My Soul	Lurrie Bell	
830	Kingsville Jukin'	Studebaker John's Maxwell Street Kings	
831	John the Conquer Root	Toronzo Cannon	
832	Troubles	John & Sylvia Embry	
833	Live at the Avant Garde	Magic Sam	
834	Stoned Soul	Giles Corey	
835	Live In Japan with Hammie Nixon	Sleepy John Estes	
836	Message in Blue	Dave Specter	
837	Set Me Free	Steve Freund and Gloria Hardiman	
838	Come Back Baby	Linsey Alexander	
839	Warning Shot	Mississippi Heat	
840	Born & Raised	Omar Coleman	
841	It Ain’t Right	Jimmy Burns	
842	Slip Into a Dream	Dave Weld and the Imperial Flames	
843	Truth	Guy King	
844	Corey Dennison Band	Corey Dennison Band	
845	Turn Up!!	Mike Wheeler Band	
846	Omar Coleman Live!	Omar Coleman	
847	Can’t Shake This Feeling	Lurrie Bell	
848	Cab Driving Man	Mississippi Heat	
849	Grown Ass Woman	Sharon Lewis and Texas Fire	
850	Lonesome Highway	Billy Flynn	
851	Two Cats	Linsey Alexander	
852	Night After Night	Corey Dennison Band	
853	Sometimes the Blues Got Me	Breezy Rodio	
854	Back to Chicago	Rockwell Avenue Blues Band	
855	Tribute to Carey Bell	Lurrie Bell & The Bell Dynasty	
856	Tribute: Delmark’s 65th Anniversary	Various Artists	
857	Willie Buck Way	Willie Buck	
858	Johnny Burgin Live	Johnny Burgin	
859	Blues from the Inside Out	Dave Specter	
860	If It Ain't Broke Don’t Fix It	Breezy Rodio	

== See also ==
- List of record labels
