= Eddie Taylor Jr. =

American blues musician (1972–2019)

- Born: Edward Taylor; March 27, 1972; Chicago, Illinois, United States
- Died: March 8, 2019 (aged 46)
- Genres: Chicago blues, electric blues
- Occupations: Guitarist, singer, songwriter
- Instruments: Guitar, vocals
- Years active: 1990s–2019
- Label: Wolf Records

Edward Taylor (March 27, 1972 – March 8, 2019), better known as Eddie Taylor Jr., was an American Chicago blues and electric blues guitarist, singer and songwriter. He released six studio albums, and a compilation album of his better known tracks, all on the European-based label, Wolf Records. Among the musicians who worked in Taylor's backing band was his fellow guitar player Johnny B. Moore. Taylor also supported other musicians including Moore, Little Arthur Duncan, Willie Kent and Hubert Sumlin, plus Buddy Guy, Keith Richards, Eric Clapton, and Billy Gibbons.

His father was Eddie Taylor, another Chicago blues musician. His step-brother Larry Taylor is a blues drummer and vocalist, and his sister Demetria is a blues vocalist in Chicago. Taylor's mother, Vera (Leevera), was the niece of the bluesmen Eddie "Guitar" Burns and Jimmy Burns.

== Life and career ==
Taylor was born in Chicago, Illinois, United States on March 27, 1972. His father, Eddie Taylor was a notable blues musician, who had relocated to Chicago from the Mississippi Delta in 1949. However, Taylor Sr. died in 1985, when his son was 13 years old. Taylor originally yearned to be a rapper, although quickly realised that was not for him. His two older brothers, Larry and Tim, became blues drummers; while his mother, Vera, maintained an intermittent career as a singer until her death in 1999. Although the young Eddie heard the Chicago blues, the family initially bought him some DJ equipment and a set of drums. It was not until after his father's death that Taylor started to play the guitar, and he later stated, "I never intended to sound like him. I just picked up a guitar, and it started coming to me." He learned to play on one of his father's old instruments, a Gibson ES-335. It was a tortuous process and took over two years for Taylor to learn how to tune his acquired guitar. This was only after John Primer borrowed it one day, and had to re-tune it to enable him to play the instrument. No one in Taylor's family, nor his contemporaries, offered him any guidance or encouragement. By the age of 18, Taylor started to associate with other blues performers such as Hubert Sumlin, Sam Lay, and Eddie Shaw. Taylor slowly found his own style and playing technique, without actually listening too much to what other blues musicians were doing at the time. He gradually built up his own name and reputation, incorporating the building blocks of the Chicago blues.

By 1998, Wolf Records persuaded Taylor to record a tribute album for his father. Lookin' for Trouble featured his mother singing on one track. His progress suffered a potentially life-threatening blow in 2002, when he was diagnosed with high blood pressure and kidney failure. He spent two months in hospital, had seven operations, and his youngest brother, Milton, donated a kidney. Taylor still required regular dialysis, with a benefit concert held to help pay his medical expenses, as he had no insurance to cover the costs. In time, following the kidney transplant, Taylor eventually resumed his live schedule. His next album release was 2004's Worried About My Baby. Both of Taylor's albums to that point had contributions from his brothers, Larry and Tim, on drums. Five of Taylor's siblings performed on his next release, Mind Game (2006). Taylor played on the soundtrack of the 2008 film, Cadillac Records.

Taylor's reputation as one of the few guitarists who could still play in the original Chicago blues style, was further enhanced by his next two releases, I Got to Make This Money, Baby (2009) and From the Country to the City (2010). He had also become a regular performer at the Chicago Blues Festival. Songs he recorded include versions of Robert Johnson's "Stop Breaking Down"; Muddy Waters' "Clouds In My Heart"; Syl Johnson's "Sock It To Me"; Ricky Allen's "Cut You A-Loose"; Magic Sam's "Easy Baby"; and one of his father's most noteworthy tracks, "I Feel So Bad". Taylor also supplied his own songs such as "Red Hot Mama", "Groovin' With Eddie", "Worried About My Baby", "Can’t Take It No More" and "Trying To Play A Mind Game".

So-Called Friends: His Best 15 Songs was issued in 2012 and included the best of his work to that point. Taylor experienced both further health problems and the death of a son, before his next album was released. Stop Breaking Down (2015) comprised 10 cover versions and two of Taylor's own tracks. Utilising guitar effects not employed by Taylor on record before, the album's tracks began with a cover of Slim Harpo's "I'm a King Bee," followed by a version of Brook Benton's "Kiddio." "Baby What You Want Me to Do," a song his father played regularly behind Jimmy Reed, was also included, plus a take on Elmore James' "The Sky Is Crying". The two Taylor numbers were "Baby Please Come Home" and "You Gotta Pay The Price". A couple of Robert Johnson penned songs, "32-20 Blues" and "Stop Breaking Down" were also incorporated in the collection.

Taylor died of heart failure on March 8, 2019, at the age of 46. In 2021 the Killer Blues Headstone Project placed the headstone for Eddie Taylor Jr. at Mt. Hope Cemetery in Chicago.

== Discography ==
Year	Title	Record label
1998	Lookin' for Trouble	Wolf Records
2004	Worried About My Baby	Wolf Records
2006	Mind Game	Wolf Records
2009	I Got to Make This Money, Baby	Wolf Records
2010	From the Country to the City	Wolf Records
2012	So-Called Friends: His Best 15 Songs	Wolf Records (Best of compilation album)
2015	Stop Breaking Down	Wolf Records

== See also ==
- List of Chicago blues musicians
