= Paul Robeson High School (Chicago) =

Public high school in Chicago, Illinois, United States

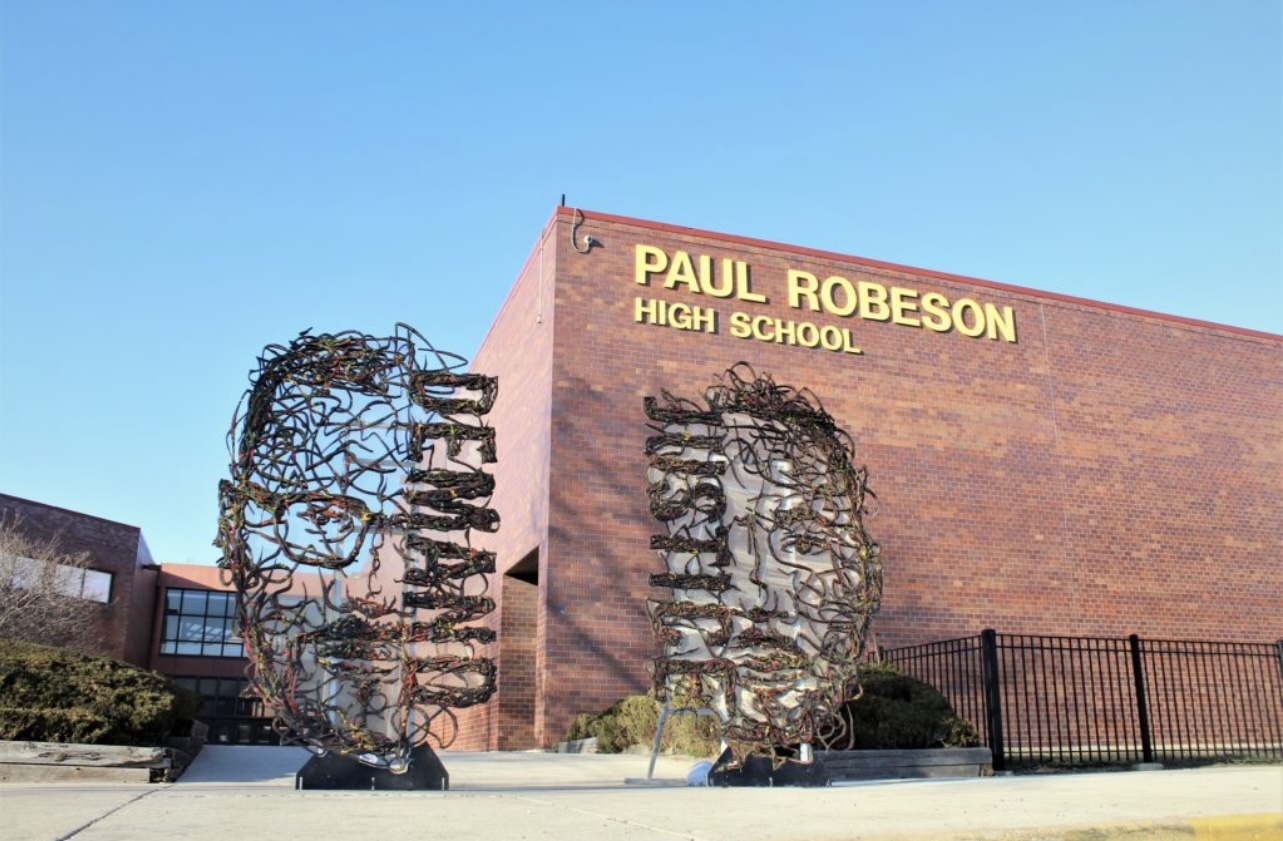
- Main entrance, 2018.

Location
- 6835 South Normal Boulevard; Chicago, Illinois 60621; United States; 41.7704°N 87.6363°W

Information
- School type: Public; Secondary
- Opened: 1977
- Status: Demolished
- Closed: June 2018
- School district: Chicago Public Schools
- CEEB code: 141070
- Principal: Melanie V. Beatty–Sevier (2017–2018)
- Grades: 9–12
- Gender: Coed
- Enrollment: 26 (2017–2018; last graduating class of seniors)
- Campus type: Urban
- Colors: Gold, scarlet, black
- Athletics conference: Chicago Public League
- Team name: Raider
- Accreditation: North Central Association of Colleges and Schools
- Website: prhs.org

Paul Robeson High School was a public four-year high school located in the Englewood neighborhood on the south side of Chicago, Illinois, United States. Opened in September 1977, Robeson was a part of the Chicago Public Schools district. The school was named in honor of African-American entertainer and athlete Paul Robeson. After years of declining enrollment and low academic performance, the school closed after the 2017–2018 school year and was later demolished in September 2018.

== History ==
Prior to becoming Robeson High School, the school was known as Parker High School from 1901 to 1977. Parker was located at 68th and Stewart Avenue (6800 S. Stewart Avenue) about 100 yards away from the present Robeson location in the Englewood area of Chicago. At the time, the school was located on the same campus with Wilson Junior college and Chicago Teachers College. The new school building was constructed on the former Normal Avenue Park site, named for Robeson, opened on September 6, 1977.

During the 2003–2004 and 2004–2005 school years, Robeson served as a receiving school for students affected by the closings of Englewood High School (which was located about 2.5 miles away) and Calumet High School, which led to Robeson being overcrowded. By the 2014–2015 school year, CPS considered the campus for consolidation due to its low–enrollment. Due to low enrollment and poor academic performance, Chicago Public Schools decided to close Robeson along with three other neighborhood high schools: Harper, Hope College Prep and Team Englewood. Robeson held its last graduation on June 12, 2018 and closed. The building was later demolished in September 2018. Englewood STEM High School was built on the site, opening on September 3, 2019.

== Athletics ==
Robeson competed in the Chicago Public League (CPL) and was a member of the Illinois High School Association (IHSA). The school teams were stylized as the Raiders for boys' teams and the Lady Raiders for girls' teams. The school's boys' tennis team won IHSA state championships in 1937–1938 and 1938–1939 as Parker High School. Since 1974, when the IHSA began sponsoring a state championship tournament in football, Robeson was the only CPL team to play in a state championship football game, finishing second in 5A in 1982–1983, until Phillips won the 4A title in 2015–2016.

== Notable alumni ==
- Carol Moseley Braun, (Parker; 1964) – former U.S. Senator (1993–99) and United States Ambassador to New Zealand (1999–2001). Braun was the first African–American woman elected to the U.S. Senate.
- Eugenia S. Chapman, (Parker; 1939) – educator and Illinois state representative
- Lil Durk (Durk Banks), (attended) – rapper
- Bo Ellis, (Parker; 1973) – former NBA player (1977–80) who spent his entire career with the Denver Nuggets. He was a member of the 1977 NCAA Division I basketball champion Marquette Warriors.
- Tom Hawkins, (Parker; 1955) – former NBA player (1959–69) and first-round draft pick.
- Holle Thee Maxwell, (Parker; 1964) – singer-songwriter with a six decade career and a command of a wide range of genres including opera, jazz, blues, R&B, pop, and country.
- Jannero Pargo, (1998) – professional basketball player.
- Jeremy Pargo, (2005) – professional basketball player.
- Mickey Pruitt, (1983) – former NFL linebacker (1988–92). Pruitt was a member of the Super Bowl XXVII champion Dallas Cowboys. He is currently in charge of football for the Chicago Public League.
- Young Chop (Tyree Pittman), (attended) – record producer and rapper.
- Mavis Staples, (Parker; 1957) – rhythm and blues and gospel singer.
- Jermaine Stewart, (Parker; 1975) – rhythm and blues and pop singer, best known for "We Don't Have to Take Our Clothes Off".
- Famous Dex (Dexter Gore Jr.), (attended) – rapper.
- Lil JoJo (Joseph Coleman), (attended) – rapper.
