= Jesse Fortune =

American singer

- Cover of Fortune's 1992 release, Fortune Tellin' Man

Background information
- Also known as: The Fortune Tellin' Man
- Born: February 28, 1930
- Origin: Macon, Mississippi, United States
- Died: August 31, 2009 (aged 79)
- Genres: Chicago blues
- Occupations: Singer, barber
- Instrument: vocals
- Years active: 1952–2009
- Labels: USA Records, Delmark

Jesse Fortune (February 28, 1930 – August 31, 2009) was an American Chicago blues singer and barber.

== Biography ==
Born in Macon, Mississippi, Fortune was trained as a barber before moving to Chicago, Illinois, in 1952. In Chicago, he worked as a barber during the day and a blues singer at night. Fortune became one of the most popular performers for "heavy duty vocal work" in the Chicago blues scene of the 1950s and 1960s. In 1952, he was hired by Otis Rush as a vocalist for the Otis Rush Band show. He also performed as a vocalist with Buddy Guy and Willie Dixon. Fortune became better known as the "Fortune Tellin' Man." Blues guitarist Dave Specter said of Fortune, "He was one of the great Chicago blues singers. He had an amazingly powerful voice, kind of in the style of early B.B. King. He had so much presence he almost didn't need a microphone." Fortune's best known recording was "Too Many Cooks," released in 1963. The Robert Cray Band later covered Fortune's "Too Many Cooks." Fortune released a number of records for the USA label, but became disillusioned with the music business. He later said that he "never made a dime from his recordings."

In 1992, Fortune made a comeback with the release of a new album titled Fortune Tellin' Man. Down Beat Magazine wrote, "Fortune's Delmark CD, Fortune Tellin' Man, showcases his gospelly vocal grit; he uses his love for B.B. King's style as a springboard instead of a crutch." And Cadence Magazine wrote, "His voice is expressive yet never sounds strained or labored. He is deeply soulful with a strutting rhythmic style ... that give this material such a freshness not often hear on Blues releases these days. Jesse Fortune's return to recording and gigging is a most welcome event." Fortune operated a barber shop on Chicago's west side in his later years and continued to perform occasionally in Chicago's blues clubs.

Delmark Records founder Bob Koester recalled Fortune's love of being a barber: "Barbering was his trade and he took more than a little pride in it. He liked running his barbershop." Fortune once "had an opportunity to sing in Europe but turned it down because he didn't want to disappoint his haircut customers."

In August 2009, Fortune died at Mt. Sinai Hospital in Chicago after collapsing on stage while performing at Gene's Playmate Lounge, a Chicago blues club. An autopsy showed he died of coronary atherosclerosis.
