= I'm a Jockey =

Studio album by Jimmy Johnson
- Released: 1994
- Studio: Streeterville
- Genre: Blues
- Length: 59:21
- Label: Verve
- Producer: Jean-François Deiber

Jimmy Johnson chronology
| Bar Room Preacher (1985) | I'm a Jockey (1994) | Every Road Ends Somewhere (1999) |

I'm a Jockey is an album by the American musician Jimmy Johnson, released in 1994. It was Johnson's first album in a decade; he took a break to recover from a 1988 van crash that injured him and killed members of his band. Johnson supported the album with a North American tour. I'm a Jockey won a 1996 W. C. Handy Award for "Comeback Blues Album". The album was reissued in 2003.

== Production ==
The songs were arranged by Gene Barge. Lucky Peterson contributed on Hammond B-3; Billy Branch played harmonica. A four-piece horn section was used on some of the tracks. "My Ring" is a reflection on life with Johnson's first wife. "Black & White Wall" is about race relations. "End of a Rainbow" is a cover of the McKinley Mitchell song. "As the Years Go Passing By" is a version of the song purportedly written by Deadric Malone. "The Highway Is Like a Woman" is a cover of the Percy Mayfield song. "Engine Number 9" and "In the Midnight Hour" are versions of songs most associated with Wilson Pickett. "That Will Never Do" was written by Little Milton.

== Critical reception ==
Professional ratings
Review scores
| Source | Rating |
|---|---|
| AllMusic | 4/5 stars |
| MusicHound Blues: The Essential Album Guide | 3/5 stars |
| The Penguin Guide to Blues Recordings | 2.5/4 stars |

The Times Colonist stated that the collection "is a stone gem... Great organ and horn-driven arrangements by Barge frame Johnson's spare, biting guitar attack and equally terse, powerfully emotive vocals." The Washington Post concluded that "the problem lies in Johnson's vocals... Though he's indebted to B.B. King and Wilson Pickett—to name just two obvious influences—he's strictly a second-tier singer." The Tulsa World determined that "Johnson's solo style is more laid-back than typical Chicago guitarists, sometimes to the point that you can't hear him amid the swinging, funky rhythm section; but he sends a good message without knocking you over the head with his guitar."

Guitar Player praised the "hopping horn arrangements and ... late-night-for-lovers feel." The Ottawa Citizen said that "with his fluid, jazzy playing, a high-pitched, soulful tenor and smartly crafted songs, Johnson has become one of Chicago's most vital and distinctive blues artists, always putting the unity of the band's groove ahead of individual glory." The Toronto Star praised Johnson's "gospel-inflected vocals and busy guitar style".

== Track listing ==
| No. | Title | Length |
|---|---|---|
| 1. | "That Will Never Do" | 5:44 |
| 2. | "Jockey" | 5:40 |
| 3. | "Engine Number 9" | 4:13 |
| 4. | "My Ring" | 4:19 |
| 5. | "Highway 13" | 5:47 |
| 6. | "As the Years Go Passing By" | 9:04 |
| 7. | "Black & White Wall" | 3:57 |
| 8. | "The Highway Is Like a Woman" | 6:37 |
| 9. | "In the Midnight Hour" | 3:22 |
| 10. | "End of Rainbow" | 4:26 |
| 11. | "Look Over Yonder's Wall" | 6:12 |
| Total length: | | 59:21 |
