= Little Arthur Duncan =

American singer

- Born: Arthur Duncan; February 5, 1934; Indianola, Mississippi, United States
- Died: August 20, 2008 (aged 74) Northlake, Illinois, United States
- Genres: Chicago blues, electric blues
- Occupations: Harmonicist, singer, songwriter
- Instruments: Harmonica, vocals
- Years active: 1950–2008
- Labels: Blues King, Delmark, Random Chance

Little Arthur Duncan (February 5, 1934 – August 20, 2008) was an American Chicago blues and electric blues harmonica player, singer, and songwriter. He was a member of the Backscratchers and over his career was associated with Earl Hooker, Twist Turner, Illinois Slim and Rick Kreher.

== Life ==
Duncan was born in Indianola, Mississippi. His first instrument was the drums. In 1950, aged 16, he moved to Chicago, Illinois, and became acquainted with Little Walter, who helped him to learn the rudiments of harmonica playing, and Jimmy Reed. He found work playing the harmonica accompanying Earl Hooker, John Brim and Floyd Jones. Billed and henceforth commonly known as Little Arthur Duncan, he played primarily in and around Chicago and built up a local reputation over the years. He performed with his own band in the Backscratcher's Social Club, which he owned. He worked in construction during the 1960s and 1970s, so was limited to playing and singing in the evenings.

In 1989, Duncan recorded the album Bad Reputation, which was released on the Blues King label. He later appeared on a compilation album, Blues Across America: The Chicago Scene, with Emery Williams Jr. and Robert Plunkett. In 1999, Duncan recorded for Delmark Records, which released the album Singin' with the Sun that year. On the album he was accompanied by the guitar players Billy Flynn and Eddie Taylor Jr. Live in Chicago followed in 2000.

His final recording was Live at Rosa's Blues Lounge, a live album recorded in Chicago in August 2007. One music journalist noted that "spirited, gritty performances of Reed's "Pretty Thing," Wolf's "No Place to Go," and two Dixon favorites ("Young Fashioned Ways" and "Little Red Rooster") leave no doubt that Duncan lives and breathes electric Chicago blues." However, a subsequent lengthy illness and hospitalization prevented Duncan from building on this success.

Duncan died in Northlake, Illinois, in August 2008, of complications following brain surgery, at the age of 74.

== Discography ==
=== Albums ===
Year	Title	Record label
1989	Bad Reputation	Blues King Records
1999	Singin' with the Sun	Delmark Records
2000	Live in Chicago	Random Chance Records
2007	Live at Rosa's Blues Lounge	Delmark Records

=== Compilation albums ===
Year	Title	Record label	Notes
1998	Blues Across America: The Chicago Scene	Cannonball Records	with Duncan, Detroit Junior, Mark Hummel, and Robert Plunkett
2002	Harmonica Blues Orgy	Delmark Records	with Duncan, Willie "Big Eyes" Smith, Martin Lang, and Easy Baby

== See also ==
- List of Chicago blues musicians
- List of electric blues musicians
- List of harmonica blues musicians
