= Mikrokolektyw =

- Origin: Wrocław, Poland
- Genres: Jazz, experimental
- Years active: 2004–present

Mikrokolektyw are an experimental jazz and improv duo based in Wrocław, Poland. In March 2010, Delmark Records announced the release of their first album Revisit, which marked the first release of a European avant jazz group on the Delmark label in its 57-year history.

== Biography ==
Kuba Suchar (drums) and Artur Majewski (trumpet) founded Mikrokolektyw in 2004 after the end of their former group Robotobibok. The duo has released two albums on the American label, Delmark Records, both produced by Raymond Salvatore Harmon.

== Discography ==
- 2010 Revisit. Delmark Records.
- 2010 Dew Point (live concert DVD). Delmark Records
- 2013 Absent Minded. Delmark Records
- 2014 Białoszewski do słuchu, VOL. IV. Bôłt Records
