= Christian Dozzler =

Austrian musician

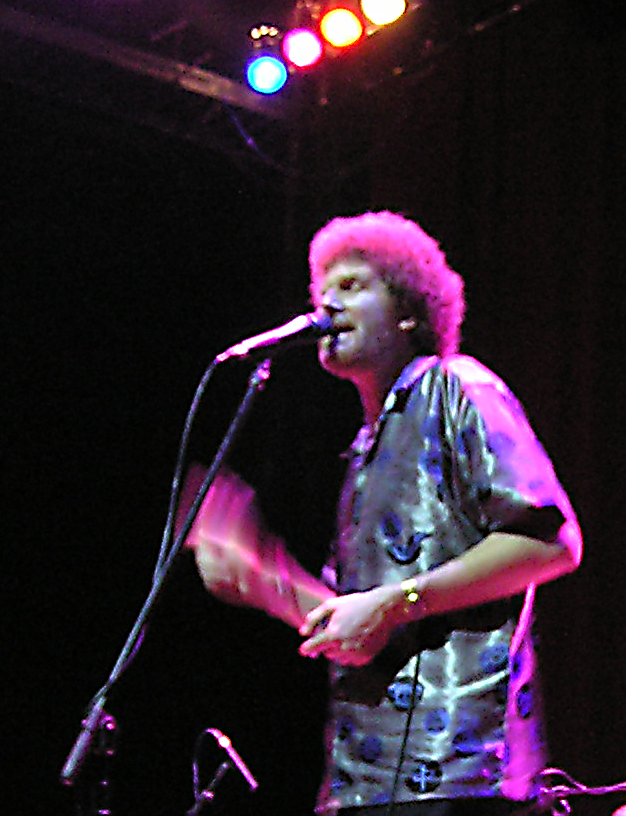
- Christian Dozzler live at House of Blues in Dallas, Texas (2007)

Background information
- Born: September 22, 1958 (age 67)
- Origin: Vienna, Austria
- Genres: Blues, Boogie Woogie, Zydeco
- Instruments: vocals, piano, harmonica, accordion, organ
- Years active: 1976–present
- Labels: BluesWave Records; Wolf Records
- Website: dozzler.com

Christian Dozzler (born September 22, 1958, Vienna, Austria) is an Austrian blues, boogie woogie and zydeco multi-instrumentalist and singer, now based in the Dallas/Fort Worth (Texas, United States) area. He plays piano, harmonica, accordion and organ, and writes most of his recorded material. He has been nicknamed "Vienna Slim".

== Biography ==
Dozzler took classical piano lessons from the age of 5. He started teaching himself to play blues and boogie woogie on the piano after he heard this music on the radio at age 14. Eventually, he also learned playing the harmonica and guitar, and formed the 'Backyard Bluesband' in 1976, while still in high school. In 1984 he got called to co-front Austria's 'Mojo Blues Band', and toured and recorded with them until 1993. From 1993 until 2000, he led his own band 'Christian Dozzler & The Blues Wave'. In 2000 he relocated to the United States and was keyboardist for the Larry Garner band from Baton Rouge, Louisiana, for two years. He settled in the Dallas/Fort Worth, Texas, area in 2002 and continued his solo career. As of 2019, he performs mostly solo piano blues in North America and Europe, but also plays with Texas blues bands like Anson Funderburgh & The Rockets, Mike Morgan and the Crawl or 'Wanda King Allstar Band' on a regular basis.

== Discography ==
Under his name:

- 1994 Take It Easy (Wolf)
- 1996 Perfect Day (Wolf)
- 1998 Smile Awhile (Wolf)
- 1999 Louisiana (BluesWave)
- 2004 All Alone and Blue (BluesWave)
- 2008 The Blues and a Half (BluesWave)
- 2009 Livin' Life (w/Robin Bank$) (BluesWave)
- 2014 Darkest Night (w/Michael van Merwyk) (Groove Stew)

Releases with other blues artists or bands:

- 1984 Mojo Blues Band – Hot Bricks (Bellaphon)
- 1986 Al Cook – A Legendary White Face In Blues (Extraplatte)
- 1986 Al Cook – On The Road To Rock & Roll (Extraplatte)
- 1987 Mojo Blues Band – Midnight in Swampland (EMI)
- 1987 Hans Theessink – Baby Wants To Boogie (Blue Groove)
- 1987 Magic Slim & The Teardrops – Chicago Blues Session Vol.3 (Wolf)
- 1987 Alabama Junior Pettis – Chicago Blues Session Vol.4 (Wolf)
- 1988 Axel Zwingenberger & Champion Jack Dupree & Mojo Blues Band – Champ's Housewarming (Vagabond)
- 1989 Mojo Blues Band & Guests – The Wild Taste Of Chicago (EMI)
- 1989 Hans Theessink – Johnny & The Devil (Blue Groove)
- 1989 Al Cook – 25 Blues Years, All Star Jamboree (Die Muehle)
- 1989 John Littlejohn – Chicago Blues Session Vol.13 (Wolf)
- 1991 Mojo Blues Band – Alligator Walk (EMI)
- 1992 Mojo Blues Band – Super Blues News (EMI)
- 1992 Axel Zwingenberger & Red Holloway & Mojo Blues Band – Heat It Up (Vagabond)
- 1993 Austrian Blues Summit (Wolf)
- 1994 Mojo Blues Band – Blues Roll On (EMI)
- 1994 Hans Theessink – Hardroad Blues (Blue Groove)
- 1995 Bluespumpm – You Got It (Sony)
- 1996 Michael Pewny – Crazy 'Bout Boogie (Bellaphon)
- 1997 Hans Theessink – Journey On (Blue Groove)
- 1999 Axel Zwingenberger & Red Holloway & Mojo Blues Band – Red Hot Boogie Woogie Party (Vagabond)
- 2000 Mojo Blues Band – Blues Parade 2000 (Styx)
- 2000 Bluespumpm – Dirty Dozen (OK)
- 2002 Larry Garner – Embarrassment to the Blues? (Ruf)
- 2002 Robin Banks – Live After Dark (self)
- 2003 Thomas Stelzer – Cajun Moon (Sap)
- 2004 Chris Zalez – Texas Cantina (Pacific Blues)
- 2007 Ray Reed – Where The Trinity Runs Free (Dialtone)
- 2007 Wanda King – Songs in the Key Of Blues (self)
- 2008 Tejas Brothers – Tejas Brothers (self)
- 2008 Aaron Burton – How Can I Be Blue (self)
- 2010 Aaron Burton – Recession Blues (self)
- 2010 Naz & The Falsehoods – Pack Of Lies (Allie Mae)
- 2010 Rev. Cadillac Johnson & The Revelators – Knee Bone Station (Rango)
- 2011 Ruff Kutt Blues Band – Mill Block Blues (Katie Mae)
- 2012 Wanda King – Bridges (self)
- 2012 Otmar Binder Trio – Boogie Woogie Turnaround (Jumpriver)
- 2013 Johnny C. Lately – Take Me As I Am (self)
- 2013 Larry Garner & Norman Beaker Band – Good Night in Vienna (self)
- 2013 Andy T.- Nick Nixon Band – Drink Drank Drunk (Delta Groove)
- 2014 Andy T.- Nick Nixon Band – Livin' It Up (Delta Groove)
- 2015 Andy T.- Nick Nixon Band – Numbers Man (Blind Pig)
- 2017 Johnny C. Lately – Johnny C. Lately (self)
- 2018 Chris Ruest – Been Gone Too Long (Enviken)
- 2019 Rockin' Johnny Burgin & Quique Gomez – Dos Hombres – Wanted! (Vizztone)

== Influences ==
Among his biggest influences, Dozzler cited pianists Otis Spann, "Big Maceo" Merriweather, Roosevelt Sykes, Katie Webster and Vince Weber, harmonica players Little Walter, Big Walter "Shakey" Horton, Sonny Boy Williamson #1 and #2, Snooky Pryor, and zydeco accordion player Clifton Chenier. As well as other artists in the Chicago blues and Swamp blues styles.

== Awards and nominations ==
- Concerto-Poll 1998 (Austria): Best Blues CD International award for Smile Awhile.
- Concerto-Poll 2000 (Austria): Best Blues/Roots Musician National award.
- Trophees France Blues 2000 (France): Nominated for Best European Blues-Singer and for Best European Blues-Artist awards.
- Blues Critic Awards 2008 (USA): Nominated for Best Blues Keyboardist.
