= John Hope College Prep =

Public high school in Chicago, Illinois, United States

Location
- 5515 South Lowe Avenue; Chicago, Illinois 60621; United States; 41.793338°N 87.640949°W

Information
- School type: Public; Secondary; Middle
- Motto: "Excellence without Excuses."
- Opened: August 1971
- Status: Closed
- Closed: January 27, 2020
- School district: Chicago Public Schools
- CEEB code: 140901
- Principal: Michael W. Durr (2018–2019)
- Grades: 9–12
- Gender: Coed
- Enrollment: 20 (2018–2019)
- Campus type: Urban
- Colors: Black; Gold
- Athletics conference: Chicago Public League
- Team name: Eagles
- Accreditation: North Central Association of Colleges and Schools
- Website: johnhopecollegeprephs.org

John Hope College Preparatory High School (JHCP) (locally known simply as John Hope) was a public 4–year high school and former middle school located in the Englewood neighborhood on the south side of Chicago, Illinois, United States. Opened in 1971, Hope was operated and owned by the Chicago Public Schools district. The school was named for African-American educator and religious leader John Hope. Hope shared its campus with Kipp Bloom College Prep School, a neighborhood charter middle school that opened for the 2013–14 school year.

== History ==
The school opened in August 1971 as John Hope Middle School, a neighborhood middle school serving students in grades six through eight. The Chicago Board of Education added 9th grade in 1997 and subsequently converted Hope into a high school to alleviate overcrowding in high schools in the area. From the 1996–1997 until the 2004–2005 school years, the school had the best academic results in the Englewood area. The middle school was reinstated for the 2002–2003 school year but again phased out after the 2006–2007 school year. Beginning in 2005, when Englewood High School was phased out, attendance borders were redrawn and Hope High received an influx of neighborhood students that it had trouble integrating.

=== Decline ===
Under the Renaissance 2010 program, several charter high schools were opened nearby and parents were also allowed to choose from schools district-wide. Fewer parents opted to send their children to Hope, while the population of Englewood was declining. In 2018, with only 36 out of a potential 638 students within the school's attendance boundary enrolled, Chicago Public Schools decided to phase out it and two other Englewood schools, Harper High School and TEAM Englewood, and to close Robeson High School at the end of the academic year to use its site for a new high school.

=== Closure and building use ===
In November 2019, the Chicago Public Schools decided to expedite the closing of Hope due to no student enrollment at the time. At the beginning of the 2019–2020 school year, Hope's entire student body had transferred to other schools within the area and district. Hope officially closed on January 27, 2020. Kipp Bloom College Prep School occupies the entire Hope campus as of the 2022–2023 school year.

=== Other information ===
Dr. Mahalia Ann Hines, the mother of Chicago-based rapper Common, was principal of the school from 1996 until her retirement in June 2005.

== Athletics ==
Hope competed in the Chicago Public High School League (CPL) and was a member of the Illinois High School Association (IHSA). The school sport teams were nicknamed Eagles. The boys' basketball team were regional champions five times (2003–04, 2004–05, 2007–08, 2011–12, and 2014–15). The girls' basketball team were regional champions eight times (2002–03, 2003–04, 2005–06, 2006–07, 2007–08, 2011–12, 2013–14, and 2014–15) and Class AA three times (2002, 2006 and 2007).
