= Tommy Douglas (clarinetist) =

American jazz clarinetist and bandleader (1906-1965)

- Born: January 9, 1906; Eskridge, Kansas, U.S.
- Died: March 9, 1965 (aged 59) South Dakota, U.S.
- Genre: Jazz
- Instruments: Clarinet, alto saxophone

Tommy Douglas (January 9, 1906 – March 9, 1965) was an American jazz clarinetist, bandleader, and reed instrumentalist.

== Early life and education ==
Douglas was born in Eskridge, Kansas. He taught himself clarinet and saxophone in school and later attended the Boston Conservatory from 1924 to 1928.

== Career ==
During his career, Douglas was known for his work as a sideman for Jelly Roll Morton and Bennie Moten. He was also an accomplished bandleader, showcasing such talent in his bands as Charlie Parker and Jo Jones, among others. He also performed with Captain Woolmack's Band and the Clarence Love Orchestra.
