= Steve Freund =

American blues musician

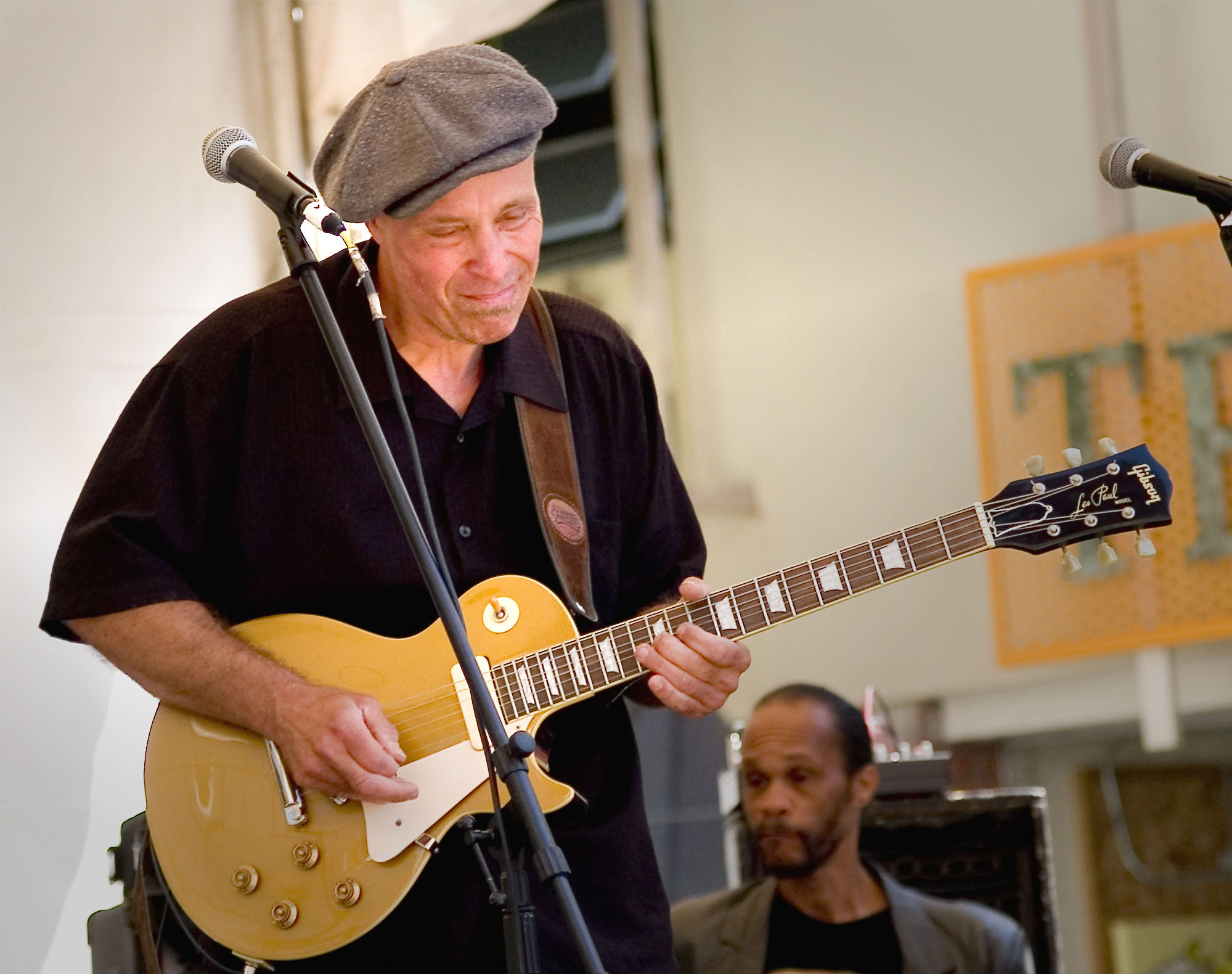
- Freund performing in August 2006

Background information
- Born: July 20, 1952 (age 73); Brooklyn, New York, US
- Genres: Blues
- Occupations: Musician; bandleader; record producer
- Instrument(s): Vocals, guitar
- Years active: 1974–present
- Labels: Delmark Records
- Website: stevefreund.com

Steve Freund (born July 20, 1952, Sheepshead Bay in Brooklyn, New York is an American blues guitarist, singer, bandleader and record producer. He has toured throughout the US including performing in New York and Chicago. He is based in the San Francisco Bay Area, where he is best known.

== Career ==
Freund came from a musical background and his mother played classical piano. He moved to Chicago in 1976. He appeared as a guest performer along with Rusty Zinn, on R.J. Mischo's 1999 album, West Wind Blowin: Mountain Top Productions, Vol. 3.

Freund appeared at the San Francisco Blues Festival in 2005, the Chicago Blues Festival in 2007, and many other major festivals worldwide.

== Discography ==
- Set Me Free – (1984)
- Romance without Finance – (1987)
- "C" For Chicago – (1999)
- I'll Be Your Mule – (2001)
- Is What It Is (with Dave Specter) – (2004)
- Lonesome Flight – (2010)
- Come On in This House – (2013)
