= Jimmy Johnson (blues guitarist) =

American blues guitarist and singer (1928–2022)

- Born: James Earl Thompson; November 25, 1928; Holly Springs, Mississippi, U.S.
- Died: January 31, 2022 (aged 93) Harvey, Illinois, U.S.
- Genres: blues; soul
- Instruments: vocals; guitar

James Earl Thompson (November 25, 1928 – January 31, 2022), known professionally as Jimmy Johnson, was an American blues guitarist and singer.

As a guitarist he was influenced by Buddy Guy and Otis Rush. He played with Freddie King, Albert King, Magic Sam, Otis Rush, and Eddy Clearwater, among others.

== Early life ==
Johnson was born in Holly Springs, Mississippi, on November 25, 1928. Several of his brothers had careers in music, among them soul musician Syl Johnson and bassist Mack Thompson, who played with Magic Sam. In his younger years, he played piano and sang in gospel groups. He and his family moved to Chicago in 1950, where he worked as a welder and played guitar in his spare time. He began playing professionally with Slim Willis in 1959, changing his last name to Johnson, as did his brother Syl.

== Career ==
In the 1960s, Johnson began to focus on soul, working with Otis Clay, Denise LaSalle, and Garland Green. He had his own group from the early 1960s, and by the mid-1960s had released his first single. By 1974, Johnson had returned to playing blues, working with Jimmy Dawkins and touring Japan with Otis Rush in 1975.

Johnson's first solo albums appeared on MCM Records in 1978 and Delmark Records in 1979, when he was 50 years old. Reviewing the 1979 Johnson's Whacks, Robert Christgau wrote in Christgau's Record Guide: Rock Albums of the Seventies (1981): "Syl's cousin performed better on Alligator's Living Chicago Blues Volume I, but only marginally, and he compensates by showing unexpected chops as a writer. Whether hoping to make the cover of Living Blues magazine or complaining that women aren't loyal any more, he comes across as a bold-faced contemporary. But his basic wail starts to sound thin after a while, his band is only solid, and his guitar can't carry the extra load."

In November 1980, Johnson was awarded at the first annual Blues Music Awards, held in Memphis. His career continued to pick up until December 2, 1988, when his touring van crashed in Indiana, killing his band's keyboardist, St. James Bryant, and bassist, Larry Exum. Johnson was injured and took an extended break from the music industry. He returned to record for Verve Records in 1994. In 2002, he recorded with his brother Syl for the album Two Johnsons Are Better Than One. He remained active and toured Europe in 2009, performing in the United Kingdom and at the Copenhagen Blues Festival in Denmark. Jimmy Johnson was still doing guest performances at 90 years old. He performed with the Dave Spector Band at the Blues, Brews and BBQ in McHenry, Illinois, on August 17, 2019, playing guitar and singing "Cold Cold Feeling" (a T-Bone Walker song).

== Later life ==
Johnson was inducted into the Blues Hall of Fame in 2016. On June 7, 2019, while performing at the 36th annual Chicago Blues Fest, Chicago mayor Lori Lightfoot officially declared it to be Jimmy Johnson Day. He was honored as "Best Blues Guitar Player" in 2020 by Living Blues, before being named "Blues Artist of the Year" the following year.

Johnson died at his home in Harvey, Illinois, on January 31, 2022, at the age of 93, six days before the death of his brother Syl.

== Discography ==
- Jimmy Johnson & Luther Johnson (MCM Records, 1977)
- Tobacco Road (MCM, 1978)
- Johnson's Whacks (Delmark Records, 1979)
- North/South (Delmark, 1982)
- Bar Room Preacher (Alligator Records, 1985)
- I'm a Jockey (Verve Records, 1994)
- Every Road Ends Somewhere (Ruf Records, 1999)
- Pepper's Hangout (Delmark, 2000)
- Ma Bea's Rock (Storyville Records, 2001)
- Heap See (Black & Blue, 2002)
- Two Johnsons Are Better Than One, with Syl Johnson (2002)
- Brothers Live (Brambus Records, 2004)
- Every Day of Your Life (Delmark, 2019)
