= Jimmy Burns =

American songwriter

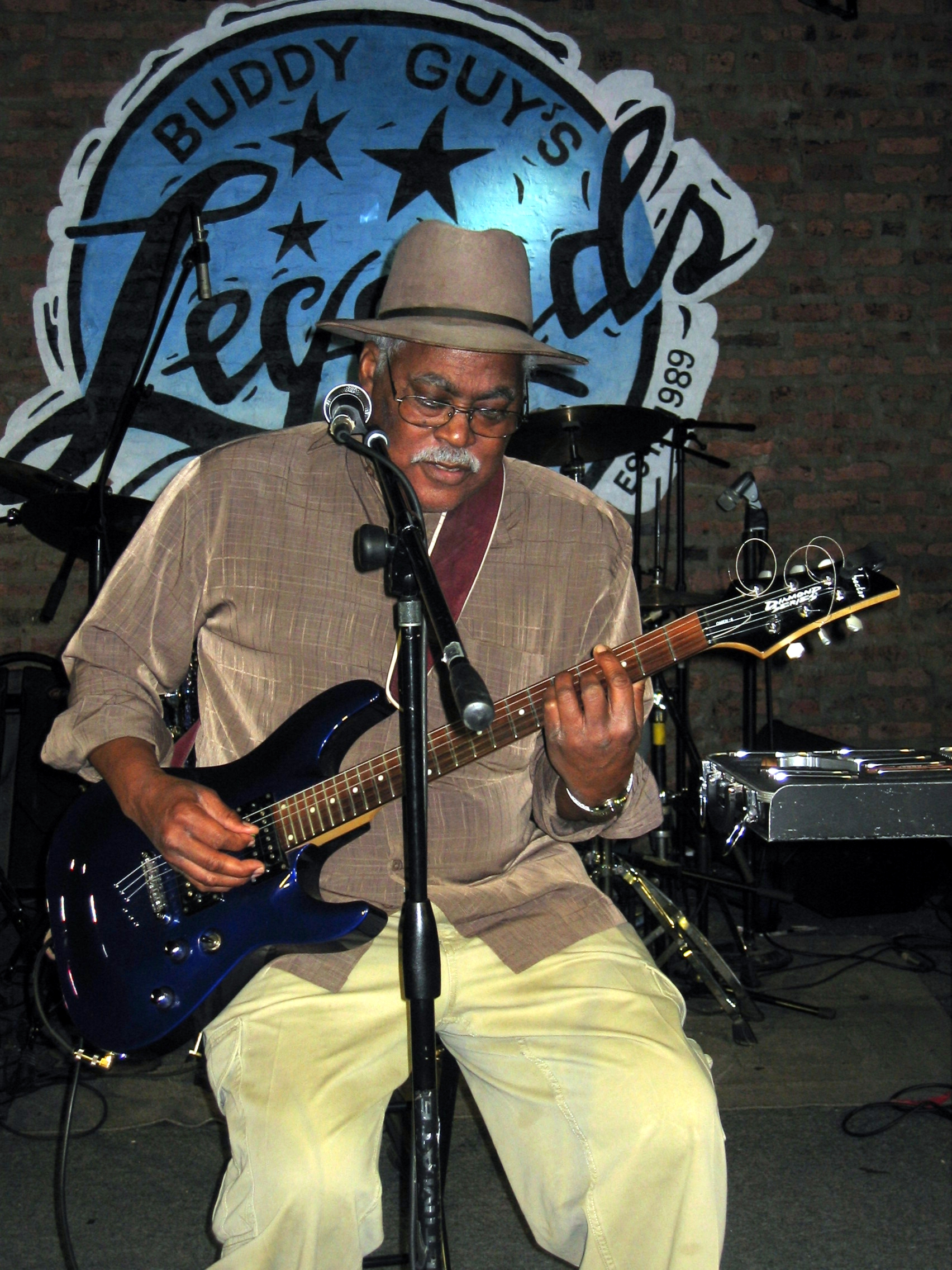

Background information
- Born: February 27, 1943 (age 83); Dublin, Mississippi, United States
- Origin: Chicago, Illinois, United States
- Genres: Soul blues, electric blues
- Occupations: Guitarist, singer, songwriter
- Instruments: Guitar, harmonica, vocals
- Years active: 1960–present
- Label: Various
- Website: web.archive.org/web/20110805113613/http://www.jimmyburnsband.com/

Jimmy Burns (born February 27, 1943) is an American soul blues and electric blues guitarist, singer and songwriter. Although he was born in the Mississippi Delta, Burns has spent nearly all his life in Chicago. His elder brother, Eddie "Guitar" Burns, was a Detroit blues musician.

== Biography ==
Jimmy Burns was born in Dublin, Mississippi, and raised on the Hilliard Cotton Plantation where he learned to play one-string and 12-string guitar. He was the youngest of eleven children. He sang in a church choir when he still lived in the Delta and he was influenced by the blues he heard on the streets. His favorite blues musician was Lightnin' Hopkins. Burns's father was a sharecropper who performed as a singer in medicine shows. At the age of 12, Jimmy Burns moved with his family to Chicago and four years later joined The Medallionaires who recorded a couple of doo-wop tracks. Recording mostly solo in the 1960s, Burns issued singles for the USA, Minit, Tip Top and Erica labels. He toured the Midwest with his backing group, the Fantastic Epics, and with another outfit called Jimmy Burns and the Gas Company into the early 1970s. Burn's 1972 single, "I Really Love You" was named in the top 500 singles of Northern soul in 2000, and it is sought by collectors. Burns took a long break from the music industry after the early 1970s to raise his family and run a barbecue stand.

He performed infrequently until the early part of the 1990s, when he started a long residency at Chicago's Smokedaddy Club. It was there that Delmark Records boss Bob Koester first heard Burns perform, and agreed to record him after hearing only one set of music. His debut album for Delmark in 1996, Leaving Here Walking, was produced by Scott Dirks, and was awarded the 'Best Blues Record of the Year' title by the National Association of Independent Record Distributors, and received two W.C. Handy Award nominations. Burns then began touring internationally.

The more recently formed Jimmy Burns Band includes Anthony Palmer (guitar), E. G. McDaniel (bass), and James Carter (drums).

Jimmy Burns played guitar on his brother Eddie's 2002 album Snake Eyes.

Burns's wife, Dorothy, died on February 12, 2010. They had six children.

== Discography ==
=== Studio albums ===
- Leaving Here Walking (1996) – Delmark / P-Vine
- Night Time Again (1999) – Delmark
- Back to the Delta (2003) – Delmark
- Stuck In The Middle (2011) – Velrone
- It Ain't Right (2015) – Delmark
- Full Circle (2025) – Delmark

=== Live album ===
- Live at B.L.U.E.S. (2007) – Delmark

=== Singles ===
- "Forget It" (1964) – USA Records
- "Give Her To Me" (1965) – Tip Top Records
- "You're Gonna Miss Me When I'm Gone" (1966) – Tip Top Records
- "I Don't Need (Your Help)" (1966) – Tip Top Records
- "I Tried" (1970) – Minit Records
- "I Really Love You" (1972) – Erica Records
- "Can't Get Over" (1980) – Dispo Records EP

== See also ==
- List of soul-blues musicians
- List of electric blues musicians
