= Love Outside of Dreams =

Studio album by Kahil El'Zabar
- Released: 2002
- Recorded: May 12, 1997
- Studio: Riverside Studio, Chicago
- Genre: Jazz
- Length: 61:08
- Label: Delmark
- Producer: Kahil El'Zabar, Steve Wagner

Kahil El'Zabar chronology
Spirits Entering (2001)	Love Outside of Dreams (2002)	If You Believe (2002)

Love Outside of Dreams is an album by the American jazz percussionist Kahil El'Zabar, recorded in 1997 and released on Delmark. He leads a trio featuring saxophonist David Murray and bassist Fred Hopkins in his last recording session. Murray and El'Zabar cut the duo album Golden Sea in 1989 and Kahil joined David's groups for A Sanctuary Within, The Tip and Jug-A-Lug in the early '90s.

== Reception ==
Professional ratings
Review scores
Source	Rating
AllMusic	4/5 stars
The Penguin Guide to Jazz	3.5/4 stars

In his review for AllMusic, Thom Jurek states: "Upon first listen, the striking and remarkable thing about Love Outside of Dreams sounds like a trio that had been playing together for no less than five or ten years. It's not just the intuition or the way in which Murray's and El'Zabar's tunes are executed, but the sheer and very muscular musicality the band plays with."

The Penguin Guide to Jazz notes: "El'Zabar and Murray clearly get on well in musical terms and this free-flowing date recalls some of the saxophonist's exciting early records, particularly in the likes of 'The Ebullient Duke'."

In a review for JazzTimes, Larry Appelbaum says: "Though this is a group that tends to play free and modern, it also knows how to swing, as it demonstrates on the rough-edged 'Nia' and a tribute to Ellington, 'The Ebullient Duke'."

== Track listing ==
All compositions by Kahil El'Zabar except as indicated

1. "Love Outside of Dreams" – 10:12
2. "Song for a New South Africa" (David Murray) – 9:34
3. "Song of Myself" – 6:57
4. "Nia" – 7:47
5. "Meditation for the Celestial Warriors" – 8:27
6. "The Ebullient Duke" – 9:31
7. "Fred" – 0:20
8. "One World Family" (Kahil El'Zabar, David Murray) – 8:20

== Personnel ==
- Kahil El'Zabar – drums, African drums, African thumb piano
- David Murray – tenor sax, bass clarinet
- Fred Hopkins – bass
