= Beautiful Ballads & Love Songs =

Beautiful Ballads & Love Songs may refer to:

- Beautiful Ballads & Love Songs (Miles Davis album), compilation album by American jazz musician Miles Davis
- Beautiful Ballads & Love Songs (Barry Manilow album), compilation album by American pop musician Barry Manilow
