= Follow the Sun =

Follow the Sun may refer to:

- Follow-the-sun, in software development
- Follow the Sun (film), a 1951 biographical film
- Follow the Sun (TV series), a 1961–62 American TV series
- Follow the Sun (Evermore album), 2012
- Follow the Sun (Kahil El'Zabar album), 2013
- "Follow the Sun" (Xavier Rudd song), 2012
- "Follow the Sun", a 1981 song by Siouxsie and the Banshees, the B-side of "Spellbound"
- "Follow the Sun", a song by Catharsis from Imago
- "Follow the Sun", an animated video by MK12
- Follow the Sun, a 2012 song by Xavier Rudd
- Follow the Sun, a 2017 compilation album of Australian music released by Mexican Summer
- "Follow the Sun", the motto of the 2028 Summer Olympics

== See also ==
- "Follow the Son", a 1994 episode of Roseanne
- "I'll Follow the Sun", a 1964 song by the Beatles
- "I'll Follow the Sun" (Mr. President song), 1995
- "Keep Searchin' (We'll Follow the Sun)", a 1964 song by Del Shannon
