= Radha Botofasina =

American harpist, pianist, and vocalist

- Occupations: Harpist, pianist and vocalist
- Instruments: Vocals, piano, harp
- Website: radhaharp.com

Radha Renee Reyes-Botofasina is an Afro-Cuban American harpist, pianist and vocalist from Brooklyn, N.Y.

As a young woman Botofasina was part of a band called The Spirits of Rhythm.

While living in Agoura Hills, CA. Botofasina became a music student of Alice Coltrane. Reyes-Botofasina has played harp at several memorial events following Coltrane's death. She is the director of the Universal Consciousness Harp Ensemble which performs in Los Angeles. Botofasina has released many albums, beginning with her debut Mantram in 1999.

Botofasina studied with Coltrane while she lived on the 50-acre ashram Coltrane founded in 1983, Coltrane died in 2007.

In the Los Angeles jazz scene Botofasina has performed harp with the Dwight Trible Cosmic Band.

In 2010, Botofasina performed Coltrane's sacred music before audiences at UCLA's Royce Hall.

Botofasina formed the Eternal Soul Orchestra (ESO) in 2013 which debuted her orchestral work Meditations on the Supreme at the California African American Museum and in 2015 in Santo Domingo, Dominican Republic.

== Discography ==
- Start the Day with Love (1993)
- Life in God (2004)
- Aspirations of the Heart (2004)
- Peace and Unity (2006)
- The Spirituals (2008)
- Urbane Ancestors (2009)
- Ekendra Das – Ethnomusicology (2011)
- Songs of the Eternal Soul (2011)
- Follow a Spiritual Path (2012)
- "Harp Meditations" (2015)
- "Ecstatic Music of Alice Coltrane" Vol. 1 (2017)
- "Songs of the Praying Women" with John Barnes (2020)
- " The Spirituals Vol 2/CarryOn" (2022)
- " India is my Soul " Harp and Sarangi (2022)

Movie: 'BodyCam" Paramount Players Pictures-"Spirit of Raghupati"-original song 2019 released 2020
