= Jitterbug Junction =

Studio album by Kahil El'Zabar
- Released: 1997
- Recorded: June 10, 1997
- Studio: Spirit Room, Rossie, New York
- Genre: Jazz
- Length: 60:58
- Label: CIMP
- Producer: Robert D. Rusch

Kahil El'Zabar chronology
The Continuum (1997)	Jitterbug Junction (1997)	Return of the Lost Tribe (1998)

Jitterbug Junction is an album by American jazz percussionist Kahil El'Zabar's Ritual Trio, which also includes saxophonist Ari Brown and bassist Malachi Favors. It was recorded in 1997 and released on CIMP.

== Reception ==
Professional ratings
Review scores
Source	Rating
AllMusic	4/5 stars
The Penguin Guide to Jazz	3/4 stars

In his review for AllMusic, Scott Yanow notes "Although at times El'Zabar's drums are rather loud in the balance (particularly on the opening track), this is very much a democracy and there are strong moments and lots of close interplay by the three musicians."

== Track listing ==
All compositions by Kahil El'Zabar except where noted

1. "From Whence It Came" – 9:37
2. "Jitterbug Junction" – 6:38
3. "One for John" (Billy Brimfield) – 10:00
4. "The Sweet Nectar of Cacophony" – 16:08
5. "Ash'E" – 5:49
6. "This Little Light of Mine" (Traditional) – 12:46

== Personnel ==
- Kahil El'Zabar – drums, thumb piano, vocals
- Ari Brown – tenor sax, soprano sax
- Malachi Favors – bass
