= Out of the Mist =

Out of the Mist may refer to:

- Out of the Mist (film), a 1927 German silent drama film
- Out of the Mist (album), a 1997 album by Joseph Jarman and Leroy Jenkins
- Out of the Mist, a 1977 album by the British progressive rock band Illusion
