= Equal Interest =

1999 studio album by Equal Interest

Studio album by Equal Interest: Joseph Jarman, Myra Melford and Leroy Jenkins
- Released: 1999
- Recorded: August 2 & 3, 1999
- Studio: Sear Sound, New York City
- Genre: Jazz
- Length: 59:13
- Label: OmniTone; 12001
- Producer: Frank Tafuri, Equal Interest

Joseph Jarman chronology
Return of the Lost Tribe (1998)	Equal Interest (1999)	Lifetime Vision Orchestra: Vision Festival 2002 (2002)

Leroy Jenkins chronology
Solo (1998)	Equal Interest (1999)	The Art of Improvisation (2004)

Myra Melford chronology
Above Blue (1999)	Equal Interest (1999)	Dance Beyond the Color (2000)

Equal Interest is an album by Equal Interest, a collaborative project by saxophonist Joseph Jarman, pianist Myra Melford and violinist Leroy Jenkins, which was recorded in 1999 and released on the OmniTone label.

The three musicians first came together during an AACM concert, after which they participated in the recording of the album Out of the Mist. According to Jenkins, during a rehearsal, they discussed continuing as a trio, and Muhal Richard Abrams proposed the name Equal Interest.

== Reception ==
Professional ratings
Review scores
Source	Rating
Allmusic	4/5 stars

In his review for AllMusic, Michael G. Nastos states: "these three brilliant musicians come together in continually surprising ways. The depth of their collective spirituality is most impressive, but the music virtually bursts with passion and vibrancy ... Following up the prelude to this recording, Out of the Mist (Ocean), this trio has exploded into a most impressive improvising unit that will hopefully continue to bring us miracles like this highly recommended CD".

Writing for the Cleveland Scene, Aaron Steinberg commented: "this eponymous debut from Equal Interest keeps a surprisingly meditative mood throughout. Difficult free music gestures are skillfully submerged in airy themes and folkish melodies, unison passages, and regular pulses. And even when one of the three musicians takes a solo into outer space, the other two temper the sound with defiantly sweet and calming accompaniment."

In a review for JazzTimes, Peter Margasak wrote: "Rarely has the phrase 'sum of its parts' applied so accurately to an all-star jazz gathering as it does to Equal Interest... On its eponymous debut the group doesn't merely pool its collective experience... but it brings a startlingly wide world of sounds to the table. While members of the AACM routinely trafficked nonchalantly in diverse styles, the range delivered by Equal Interest is stunning nonetheless, adding to the expected fusion of jazz, boogie woogie and blues with a complement of international sounds that never sounds like a lazy hodgepodge."

== Track listing ==
1. "B'pale Night" (Leroy Jenkins) – 6:19
2. "Rondo for Jenny" (Joseph Jarman) – 7:13
3. "Over This/Living Music" (Myra Melford) – 10:46
4. "Poem Song" (Jarman) – 13:24
5. "In the Moment" (Jenkins) – 6:05
6. "The Beauty We Love" (Melford) – 5:30
7. "Everything Today" (Melford) – 3:36
8. "Apricots from Eden ("Sourmaloui Jerk")" (Traditional Armenian) – 6:20

== Personnel ==
- Joseph Jarman – flute, alto saxophone, Turkish hand drum, Vietnamese oboe, wind chimes
- Leroy Jenkins – violin, viola
- Myra Melford – piano, harmonium
