= Another Kind of Groove =

Studio album by Kahil El'Zabar
- Released: 1987
- Recorded: 1986
- Genre: Jazz
- Label: Sound Aspects

Kahil El'Zabar chronology
Sacred Love (1986)	Another Kind of Groove (1987)	Ancestral Song (1988)

Another Kind of Groove is an album by the American musician Kahil El'Zabar, released in 1987. It is credited to Kahil El'Zabar's The Ritual.

== Production ==
The album was recorded in May 1986. El'Zabar was backed by Malachi Favors on bass and Billy Bang on violin.

== Critical reception ==
Professional ratings
Review scores
Source	Rating
AllMusic	4/5 stars
The Encyclopedia of Popular Music	3/5 stars
The Penguin Guide to Jazz on CD	3/4 stars

The Washington Post said that "the most imaginative and compelling tunes are found on the flip side, where El' Zabar and Favors exploit a vast array of percussion instruments and Bang plays with a rhythmic intensity to match his astringent tone." The Ann Arbor News opined that Another Kind of Groove was one of the best jazz albums of 1987. The Boston Globe also considered it to be one of the best jazz albums of 1987; the paper subsequently listed it as one of the 10 best jazz albums of the 1980s.

In 1995, the Chicago Tribune praised "the mesmerizing backbeats and spirit of incantation that permeate" the title track. The Houston Chronicle stated, "El'Zabar's drumming combines the wide-open approach of free jazz with the insistent groove of African-American folk forms."The Rough Guide to Jazz said that "Bang's playing is at its funkiest and most exhilarating".

== Track listing ==
Side 1

1. "The Opening"
2. "Ocean Deep"
3. "Return of the Lost Tribe"

Side 2

1. "Little Gwen"
2. "Pedro"
3. "Another Kind of Groove"
4. "Freedom of Speech"
