= Big M: A Tribute to Malachi Favors =

Live album by Kahil El'Zabar's Ritual Trio featuring Billy Bang
- Released: October 17, 2006
- Recorded: December 20 & 21, 2004
- Studio: Riverside Studio, Chicago, IL
- Genre: Jazz
- Length: 64:57
- Label: Delmark; DE-572
- Producer: Robert G. Koester, Steve Wagner

Kahil El'Zabar chronology
Live at the River East Art Center (2005)	Big M: A Tribute to Malachi Favors (2006)	Hot 'N' Heavy (2007)

Billy Bang chronology
Live at the River East Art Center (2005)	Big M: A Tribute to Malachi Favors (2006)	Above and Beyond: An Evening in Grand Rapids (2007)

Big M: A Tribute to Malachi Favors is an album by Kahil El'Zabar's Ritual Trio, featuring violinist Billy Bang, that was recorded in Chicago in late 2004 and released on the Delmark label.

== Reception ==
Professional ratings
Review scores
Source	Rating
AllMusic	3.5/5 stars
All About Jazz	4.5/5 stars
The Penguin Guide to Jazz Recordings	3/4 stars

In his review for AllMusic, Scott Yanow notes that "Kahil El'Zabar's quartet is an all-star group with enormous potential. The material that they interpret on Big M (a tribute to the late Art Ensemble of Chicago bassist Malachi Favors), unfortunately, is not up to the level of the musicians. Much of the time the players are heard here merely jamming on simple vamps that overstay their welcome. There are some fiery moments from the individual musicians ... but the weak originals make this a less memorable set than it should have been considering the artists involved". On All About Jazz, Troy Collins wrote: "Mixing together a program of deep Afro-centric grooves, jubilant funk vamps and serene atmospheric ballads, Big M is a magical and heartfelt memorial to one of jazz's finest artists ... Teeming with vivaciousness, this celebratory ode to the life of Malachi Favors avoids morose lamentation, and the result is a joyous, viable tribute to a beloved artist".

In JazzTimes, Mike Shanley wrote that "Kahil El’Zabar (drums) and Yosef Ben Israel (bass) spend most of Big M playing strong grooves from which they barely diverge. This is not to say that their roles are overly simplistic or that this music gets repetitive. They actually create a high level of excitement for what lies ahead ... Brown and Bang serve as ideal frontline partners throughout the album, with the saxophonist’s often gruff tone complementing a violin performance that combines an equally rugged attack with an often gentle sense of lyricism". The Washington Post called the album "a series of stirring, spiritual and deeply heartfelt performances".

== Track listing ==
All compositions by Kahil El'Zabar except where noted

1. "Crumb-Puck-U-Lent" – 6:26
2. "Oof" – 11:21
3. "Freedom Flexibility" (Billy Bang) – 8:50
4. "Big M" – 5:52
5. "Kau" – 11:22
6. "Maghoustut" – 10:58
7. "Malachi" – 10:08

== Personnel ==
- Kahil El'Zabar – drums, earth drums, kalimba, flute, vocals
- Yosef Ben Israel – bass
- Ari Brown – tenor saxophone, piano
- Billy Bang – violin
