= Forces and Feelings =

Studio album by Kalaparusha Maurice McIntyre
- Released: 1970
- Recorded: November 11, 1970
- Studio: Sound Studios, Chicago
- Genre: Jazz
- Length: 55:22 CD reissue with additional tracks
- Label: Delmark; DS-425
- Producer: Robert G. Koester

Maurice McIntyre chronology
Humility in the Light of the Creator (1969)	Forces and Feelings (1970)	Peace and Blessings (1979)

Forces and Feelings is an album by the American jazz saxophonist Maurice McIntyre recorded in 1970 and released by the Delmark label.

== Reception ==
Professional ratings
Review scores
Source	Rating
AllMusic	3/5 stars
The Austin Chronicle	4/5 stars
The Penguin Guide to Jazz Recordings	3/4 stars
The Encyclopedia of Popular Music	3/5 stars

AllMusic reviewer Al Campbell stated: "Much like his first effort, Humility in Light of the Creator, Forces and Feelings projects a spiritual tone. While it is occasionally more relaxed than his debut, that's not to say this is McIntyre's mellow disc -- far from it. ... Considering the lack of recordings made by this underrated tenor saxophonist, any of his discs are recommended.".

Harvey Pekar of The Austin Chronicle wrote: "The improvisation... may not be based on pre-set chord progressions, but the groups' performances are tight and coherent; members pay attention to collective interplay and textural and dynamic subtleties."

Writing for The Hum, Bradford Bailey commented: "We find McIntyre pushing into unimaginable places, and bringing clarity to his unique creative voice. He skirts closer to outright Free-Jazz with incredibly complex tonal relationships and rhythmic partnerships, but never loses the depth of emotion which characterizes his playing."

== Track listing ==
All compositions by Kalaparusha Maurice McIntyre

1. "Behold! God's Sunshine!" – 4:24 Additional track on CD reissue
2. "Fifteen or Sixteen" – 10:06
3. "Sun Spots" – 7:48
4. "Ananda" – 3:50
5. "Twenty-One Lines" – 11:48
6. "Behold! God's Sunshine!" – 8:19
7. "Ananda" – 9:26 Additional track on CD reissue

== Personnel ==
- Kalaparusha Maurice McIntyre - tenor saxophone, clarinet, flute, bells
- Sarnie Garrett – guitar
- Fred Hopkins – bass
- Wesley Tyus – drums
- Rita Omolokun – vocals
