= Venus (Ari Brown album) =

Studio album by Ari Brown
- Released: 1998
- Recorded: March 3 and 4, 1998
- Studios: Riverside Studio, Chicago
- Genre: Jazz
- Length: 1:03:36
- Labels: Delmark; DE 504
- Producers: Robert G. Koester, Steve Wagner

Ari Brown chronology
Ultimate Frontier (1996)	Venus (1998)	Live at the Green Mill (2007)

Venus is the second album by saxophonist and pianist Ari Brown. It was recorded on March 3 and 4, 1998, at Riverside Studio in Chicago, and was released later that year by Delmark Records. On the album, Brown is joined by pianist Kirk Brown (Ari's brother), double bassist Josef Ben Israel, and drummer Avreeayl Ra.

== Reception ==
Professional ratings
Review scores
Source	Rating
AllMusic	4/5 stars
The Penguin Guide to Jazz Recordings	3/4 stars

In a review for AllMusic, Michael G. Nastos described the album as "marvelous," and wrote: "All the swing, soul, spirit and spunk you could possibly want in your daily helping of modern jazz is here for the tasting... This CD is not just a hint at the diverse exuberance Brown possesses. It is the complete realization of an artists dream fulfilled. He should be very proud of this, a truly exceptional musical statement."

LA Weekly's Greg Burk called Brown Chicago's "unknown master," whose playing "flows like a warm river, just making time disappear." He stated: "The irresistible title number, simultaneously a lament and a Latin celebration, is as wonderful a tribute to a dead friend as you could conceive."

Jack Bowers of All About Jazz called Brown "one of Chicago's most versatile and accomplished 'unknown' musicians," and commented: "To those who prefer their Jazz straight–up, as I do, I can wholly recommend about half of this session... The rest is more, shall we say, idiosyncratic."

The authors of The Penguin Guide to Jazz Recordings singled out "Oh What A World We're Living In" for praise, describing it as "secular gospel of an individual order," and suggesting that "the more inward playing" suits Brown best.

== Track listing ==
"Quiet Time" was composed by Kirk Brown. Remaining tracks were composed by Ari Brown.

1. "Oui Lee" – 8:44
2. "Trane's Example" – 8:25
3. "Roscoe" – 3:40
4. "Venus" – 13:23
5. "Quiet Time" – 3:15
6. "Baldhead Gerald" – 9:05
7. "Oh What A World We're Living In" – 5:55
8. "Rahsaan In The Serengeti" – 11:09

== Personnel ==
- Ari Brown – alto saxophone, tenor saxophone, soprano saxophone
- Kirk Brown – piano
- Yosef Ben Israel – double bass
- Avreeayl Ra – drums
- Thaddeus Expose – double bass (track 8)
- Art "Turk" Burton, Enoch – percussion (tracks 4 and 8)
