= Live at the Green Mill =

Live album by Ari Brown
- Released: 2007
- Recorded: June 22 and 23, 2007
- Venues: Green Mill Cocktail Lounge, Chicago
- Genre: Jazz
- Length: 1:06:46
- Labels: Delmark; DE 577 (CD); DE 1577 (DVD)

Ari Brown chronology
Venus (1998)	Live at the Green Mill (2007)	Groove Awakening (2013)

Live at the Green Mill is the third album by saxophonist and pianist Ari Brown. His first live release, it was recorded on June 22 and 23, 2007, at the Green Mill Cocktail Lounge in Chicago, and was issued later that year on both CD and DVD by Delmark Records. On the album, Brown is joined by trumpeter Pharez Whitted, pianist Kirk Brown (Ari's brother), double bassist Yosef Ben Israel, and drummer Avreeayl Ra.

== Reception ==
Professional ratings
Review scores
Source	Rating
All About Jazz	4/5 stars
All About Jazz	3.5/5 stars
AllMusic	4/5 stars

Howard Reich of the Chicago Tribune called the album one of 2007's "best jazz recordings," noting Brown's "muscular, outsize sound."

In a review for AllMusic, Al Campbell wrote: "Brown continues to illuminate the AACM style of experimental jazz he's been exploring since the early '70s... while the passion of free jazz underlies them, these compositions are more inspired than fiery... highly recommended."

Exclaim!'s Glen Hall described the music as "exactly the kind of heartfelt, gutsy jazz that can penetrate even a jaded listener's blasé attitude," and stated: "These guys genuinely mean what they're playing. And their organic, blues-rooted earthiness exudes confident, gritty virility, the hallmark of their Chicago hometown."

Writing for Jazzwise, Kevin Le Gendre commented: "Brown may be steeped in 1960s post-bop but he strays artfully into other lexicons... [he] is a solid leader who solos very engagingly... and his sidemen... are very good in their support."

Mark Corroto of All About Jazz remarked: "No need to command Ari Brown to make a joyful sound, he gladly obliges on this live date... His playing is soulful and immense. He can fill the room with a blanket of sound." AAJ's Nic Jones noted Brown's "never overpowering but always heartfelt musical sincerity," and wrote: "His playing is graced also with unmistakable economy: not a note is wasted in a tenor sax solo that also hints at a largely overlooked player like Harold Ashby, particularly in the grain of the tone, albeit in a harmonically more advanced setting." AAJ reviewer Jerry D'Souza stated: "This is constantly stimulating music, the band coming together and playing with a soulful fire. Artistry is never sacrificed at the altar of self-indulgence, and invention is built layer upon coherent layer. Could one ask for more?" Writer John Barron added: "Brown's playing is vivacious and strong. His distinctive approach to improvisation is at times filled with raw energy... and breathy lyricism."

== Track listing ==
Composed by Ari Brown.

1. "Richard's Tune" – 13:48
2. "One for Skip" – 14:03
3. "Waltz of the Prophets" – 11:50 (bonus track on DVD)
4. "Shorter's Vibes" – 11:03
5. "Two Gun V" – 6:33
6. "Kylie's Lullaby" – 11:44
7. "Evod" – 8:10

== Personnel ==
- Ari Brown – tenor saxophone, soprano saxophone, flute
- Pharez Whitted – trumpet (tracks 1, 3, 6, and 7)
- Kirk Brown – piano
- Yosef Ben Israel – double bass
- Avreeayl Ra – drums
- Dr. Cuz – percussion (tracks 1, 4–7)
