= Death of a Sideman =

Studio album by David Murray
- Released: 1992
- Recorded: October 18–19, 1991
- Genre: Jazz
- Length: 57:50
- Label: DIW
- Producer: Kazunori Sugiyama

David Murray chronology
A Sanctuary Within (1992)	Death of a Sideman (1992)	Ballads for Bass Clarinet (1992)

Death of a Sideman is an album by David Murray which was released on the Japanese DIW label in 1992. It features performances by Murray, trumpeter Bobby Bradford, pianist Dave Burrell, bassist Fred Hopkins and drummer Ed Blackwell of a set of compositions by Bradford.

== Reception ==
The Allmusic review by Brian Olewnick awarded the album 4 stars stating "Death of a Sideman is one of the stronger efforts in Murray's mature catalog, thanks in no small part to the presence and guiding hand of Bobby Bradford. Recommended.".

Professional ratings
Review scores
Source	Rating
Allmusic	4/5 stars

== Track listing ==
1. "Have You Seen Sideman?" - 9:01
2. "Woodshedetude" - 5:30
3. "Waiting for Thelonious" - 10:36
4. "A Little Pain" - 6:15
5. "Sidesteps" - 6:56
6. "The Gates of Hell" - 6:51
7. "Bosom of Abraham" - 7:31
8. "Have You Seen Sideman?" - 5:10

All compositions by Bobby Bradford

  - Recorded 1991

== Personnel ==
- David Murray – tenor saxophone, bass clarinet
- Bobby Bradford – trumpet
- Dave Burrell – piano
- Fred Hopkins – bass
- Ed Blackwell – drums
