= Kalaparusha Maurice McIntyre =

American free jazz saxophonist

- Also known as: Kalaparush Ahrah Difda
- Born: Maurice Benford McIntyre; March 24, 1936; Clarksville, Arkansas, U.S.
- Died: November 9, 2013 (aged 77) The Bronx, New York, U.S.
- Genres: Jazz
- Instruments: Tenor saxophone, woodwind instruments
- Years active: 1960s–2013

Kalaparusha Maurice McIntyre (March 24, 1936 – November 9, 2013) was an American free jazz tenor saxophonist.

== Biography ==
McIntyre, who was born in Clarksville, Arkansas, United States, but raised in Chicago, Illinois, studied at the Chicago College of Music, and during the 1960s began playing with musicians such as Malachi Favors, Muhal Richard Abrams, and Roscoe Mitchell. Along with them he became a member of the ensemble Association for the Advancement of Creative Musicians in 1965. His first solo record appeared in 1969. During this time he also recorded as a session musician for Delmark Records, playing with George Freeman, J. B. Hutto, and Little Milton, among others.

That year, McIntyre was convicted of drug offences and served his sentence in Lexington, Kentucky.

McIntyre moved to New York City in the 1970s, playing at Sam Rivers's Rivbea Studios and teaching at Karl Berger's Creative Studio. He and Muhal Richard Abrams toured Europe several times. After his 1981 live album, McIntyre recorded very little, playing on the streets and in the subways of New York. His next major appearance on record was not until 1998, with Pheeroan akLaff and Michael Logan; the following year, he played with many AACM ensemble members on the album Bright Moments. He continued to release as a leader into the 2000s.

He died in November 2013, in The Bronx, New York, at the age of 77.

== Discography ==
=== As leader ===
- Humility in the Light of the Creator (Delmark, 1969)
- Forces and Feelings (Delmark, 1970)
- Kalaparusha (Trio Records, 1975)
- Live from Studio Rivbea (NoBusiness Records, 1975)
- Kwanza (Baystate, 1978)
- Peace and Blessings (Black Saint, 1979)
- Ram's Run (Cadence, 1981)
- Return of the Lost Tribe (Delmark, 1997) as Bright Moments with Joseph Jarman, Kahil El'Zabar, Malachi Favors and Adegoke Steve Colson
- Dream of... (CIMP, 1998)
- Wildflowers: The New York Loft Jazz Sessions - Complete (Knit Classics, 1999)
- South Eastern (CIMP, 2002)
- The Moment (Entropy Stereo, 2003)
- Morning Song (Delmark, 2004)
- Paths to Glory (CIMP, 2004)
- Solo (Nolabel, 2005)
- Extremes (CIMP, 2007)
- Musical Blessing (CIMP, 2012)
- Creative Music Studio Archive Selections - Volume 2 (Planet Arts, 2015)
- Live from Studio Rivbea: July 12, 1975 (NoBusiness, 2024)

=== As sideman ===
With Muhal Richard Abrams

- Levels and Degrees of Light (Delmark, 1968)

With Ethnic Heritage Ensemble

- Welcome (Leo, 1982)

With George Freeman

- Birth Sign (Delmark, 1970)

With Leroy Jenkins

- For Players Only (JCOA, 1975)

With Roscoe Mitchell

- Sound (Delmark, 1966)
