= Freedom Jazz Dance =

Studio album by Ethnic Heritage Ensemble
- Released: 1999
- Recorded: March 8 & 9, 1999
- Studio: Riverside Studio, Chicago
- Genre: Jazz
- Length: 66:27
- Label: Delmark
- Producer: Kahil El'Zabar

Kahil El'Zabar chronology
| Conversations (1999) | Freedom Jazz Dance (1999) | Africa N'Da Blues (2000) |

Freedom Jazz Dance is an album by Ethnic Heritage Ensemble, a jazz band formed by percussionist Kahil El'Zabar, who is joined by trombonist Joseph Bowie, saxophonist Ernest Dawkins and special guest guitarist Fareed Haque. It was recorded in 1999 and released on Delmark.

== Reception ==
Professional ratings
Review scores
| Source | Rating |
|---|---|
| AllMusic | 4/5 stars |
| The Penguin Guide to Jazz | 4/4 stars |

In her review for AllMusic, Stacia Proefrock states: "The four men create a fine balance, with the percussive elements of El'Zabar and the other players providing a strongly Africanized structure upon which to hang the music, while the horns and Fareed Haque's guitar playing pull the sound back in the direction of jazz."

The Penguin Guide to Jazz says: "The addition of Haque gives the band yet another sound, even while working off the same formula of two horns and a drum.. The result is arguably the best EHE album to date."

In a review for JazzTimes Christopher Potter states: "Augmented by guitarist Fareed Haque, Freedom Jazz Dance elevates the Ensemble's usual two-horns-and-drums lineup to a higher level of tonal beauty."

The All About Jazz review by Derek Taylor says: "Following along the same confident path trod by his predecessors Haque refuses slip comfortably into the role of complacent guest star. His nimble fingers shape subtle, but firm, string sculptures that effectively shift the dynamics of the group in new and provocative ways."

== Track listing ==
All compositions by Kahil El'Zabar except as indicated

1. "Freedom Jazz Dance" (Eddie Harris) – 7:44
2. "Katon" – 8:54
3. "Catch Me" – 7:52
4. "Mama's House" – 11:27
5. "So Low But Not Alone" – 12:37
6. "This Little Light of Mine" (Traditional) – 6:47
7. "Barundi" – 11:06

== Personnel ==
- Kahil El'Zabar – drums, percussion, African thumb piano
- Joseph Bowie – trombone, percussion
- Ernest Dawkins – alto sax, tenor sax, percussion
- Fareed Haque – acoustic guitar, electric guitar, percussion
