= Africa N'Da Blues =

Studio album by Kahil El'Zabar's Ritual Trio featuring Pharoah Sanders
- Released: August 15, 2000
- Recorded: December 17 & 18, 1999
- Studio: Riverside, Chicago, IL
- Genre: Jazz
- Length: 71:18
- Label: Delmark; DE-519
- Producer: Kahil El'Zabar, Robert G. Koester

Kahil El'Zabar chronology
| Freedom Jazz Dance (1999) | Africa N'Da Blues (2000) | One World Family (2000) |

Pharoah Sanders chronology
| Save Our Children (1999) | Africa N'Da Blues (2000) | Spirits (2000) |

Africa N'Da Blues is an album by Kahil El'Zabar's Ritual Trio featuring saxophonist Pharoah Sanders, recorded in 1999 and released on the Delmark label.

== Reception ==
Professional ratings
Review scores
| Source | Rating |
|---|---|
| AllMusic | 4/5 stars |
| The Penguin Guide to Jazz Recordings | 2/4 stars |

In his review for AllMusic, Alex Henderson notes, "the group couldn't have asked for a more appropriate guest. Like drummer/percussionist El'Zabar, he is a very flexible musician who is comfortable with both inside and outside playing ... this post-bop date generally favors an inside/outside approach and is more inside than outside. Most of the material, in fact, is quite melodic ... Thanks to Sanders' participation, Africa N'da Blues is arguably the strongest album that Ritual Trio recorded for Delmark in the 1990s." On All About Jazz, Derek Taylor said, "Far from being formulaic in a negative sense El’Zabar’s preferred rubric for the Ritual Trio in recent years has resulted in some of the most stimulating music of his career. This disc, while at times adhering a little to [sic] closely to the itinerary of past projects continues the successful streak substantiated by these earlier efforts. Thankfully it also demonstrates conclusively that Sanders retirement is still a long way off."

== Track listing ==
All compositions by Kahil El'Zabar except where noted

1. "Ka-Real" [take 2] (Joseph Bowie) – 12:38
2. "Africanos/ Latinos" (Kahil El'Zabar, Susana Sandoval) – 9:52
3. "Miles' Mode" (John Coltrane) – 7:21
4. "Autumn Leaves" (Joseph Kosma, Jacques Prévert, Johnny Mercer) – 11:26
5. "Africa N'Da Blues" – 7:34
6. "Pharoah's Song" – 11:42
7. "Ka-Real" [take 1] (Bowie) – 10:45

== Personnel ==
- Kahil El'Zabar – drums, percussion
- Ari Brown – piano, tenor saxophone, soprano saxophone
- Malachi Favors – bass
- Pharoah Sanders – tenor saxophone
- Susana Sandoval – spoken word (track 2)
