= Beautiful Ballads & Love Songs (Miles Davis album) =

Compilation album by Miles Davis
- Released: January 15, 2008
- Genre: Jazz
- Length: 68:46
- Label: Columbia/Legacy
- Producer: George Avakian, Miles Davis, Robert Irving III, Cal Lampley, Teo Macero, Richard Seidel, Irving Townsend

Miles Davis chronology
Mile's Groove (2008)	Beautiful Ballads & Love Songs (2008)	Playlist (2008)

Professional ratings
Review scores
Source	Rating
AllMusic	4/5 stars

Beautiful Ballads & Love Songs is a compilation album by American jazz musician Miles Davis that was released on January 15, 2008, by Columbia Records.

== Track listing ==
1. "'Round Midnight" (Hanighen, Monk, Williams) – 5:58
2. "Summer Night" (Dubin, Warren) – 6:00
3. "Corcovado (Quiet Nights)" (Jobim) – 2:44
4. "Stella by Starlight" (Washington, Young) – 4:45
5. "My Ship" (Gershwin, Weill) – 4:33
6. "I Thought About You" (Mercer, VanHeusen) – 4:55
7. "Bess, You Is My Woman Now" (Gershwin, Gershwin, Heyward) – 5:11
8. "Blue in Green" (Davis) – 5:38
9. "I Loves You Porgy" (Gershwin, Gershwin, Heyward) – 3:42
10. "I Fall in Love Too Easily" (Cahn, Styne) – 6:46
11. "Time After Time" (Hyman, Lauper) – 3:41
12. "My Funny Valentine" (Hart, Rodgers) – 14:53

== Charts ==
Chart	Peak chart position
Billboard Top Jazz Albums	48
