= Ari Brown =

American jazz musician

- Born: February 1, 1944; Chicago, Illinois, U.S.
- Occupations: Musician, composer
- Instruments: Tenor saxophone, alto saxophone, soprano saxophone, piano, flute
- Years active: 1971–present
- Label: Delmark Records

Ari Brown (born February 1, 1944) is an American jazz tenor saxophonist and pianist.

== Biography ==
Brown grew up in Chicago and attended Wilson College, where he met musicians such as Jack DeJohnette, Henry Threadgill, Roscoe Mitchell, and Joseph Jarman. He played piano in R&B and soul outfits into the 1960s, then switched to saxophone in 1965. He joined the AACM in 1971, and also played with The Awakening in the early 1970s. In 1974 he lost several teeth in a car crash, and temporarily switched to piano again until he recovered. He played sax later in the 1970s with McCoy Tyner, Don Patterson, and Sonny Stitt. In the 1980s, he started his own quintet, and also worked with Lester Bowie, Von Freeman, Bobby Watson, and Anthony Braxton, and in 1989 he became a member of Kahil El'Zabar's trio. In 1995, he recorded his first album as a leader, titled Ultimate Frontier, and released by Delmark Records.

== Discography ==
=== As leader ===
- 1995: Ultimate Frontier (Delmark Records)
- 1998: Venus (Delmark)
- 2007: Live at the Green Mill (Delmark)
- 2013: Groove Awakening (Delmark)

=== As sideman ===
With Joshua Abrams' Cloud Script

- Cloud Script (Rogueart, 2020)

With Dee Alexander

- Songs My Mother Loves (Blujazz, 2014)

With The Awakening

- Hear, Sense and Feel (1972)
- Mirage (1973)

With Anthony Braxton

- Anthony Braxton's Charlie Parker Project 1993 (HatART, 1993 [1995])

With the Chicago Jazz Philharmonic

- Collective Creativity (2008)

With Orbert Davis

- Unfinished Memories (1994)
- Priority (2001)
- Blue Notes (2004)

With Kahil El'Zabar's Ritual Trio

- Alika Rising (Sound Aspects, 1990)
- Renaissance of the Resistance (Delmark, 1994)
- Big Cliff (Delmark, 1995)
- Jitterbug Junction (CIMP, 1997)
- Conversations (Delmark, 1999) with Archie Shepp
- Africa N'Da Blues (Delmark, 2000) with Pharoah Sanders
- Live at the River East Art Center (Delmark, 2005)
- Big M: A Tribute to Malachi Favors (Delmark, 2006)
- Follow the Sun (Delmark, 2013)

With Elvin Jones Jazz Machine

- Soul Train (1980)

With the Juba Collective

- Juba Collective (2002)

With Famoudou Don Moye

- Jam for Your Life! (AECO, 1985)

With Natural Information Society

- Simultonality (Eremite, 2017)
- Since Time Is Gravity (Eremite, 2023)

With Malachi Thompson

- Buddy Bolden's Rag (Delmark, 1995)
- Blue Jazz (Delmark, 2003) with Gary Bartz and Billy Harper

With Frank Walton

- Reality (Delmark, 1978)
