= Ultimate Frontier =

Studio album by Ari Brown
- Released: 1996
- Recorded: January 17 and 18, 1995
- Studios: Riverside Studio, Chicago
- Genre: Jazz
- Length: 58:45
- Labels: Delmark; DE 486
- Producers: Robert G. Koester, Steve Wagner

Ari Brown chronology
Ultimate Frontier (1996)	Venus (1998)

Ultimate Frontier is the debut album by saxophonist and pianist Ari Brown. Featuring six original compositions plus a traditional piece, it was recorded on January 17 and 18, 1995, at Riverside Studio in Chicago, and was released in 1996 by Delmark Records. On the album, Brown is joined by pianist Kirk Brown (Ari's brother), double bassist Yosef Ben Israel, and drummer Avreeayl Ra.

Prior to the recording session, Brown had been active as a sideman since the 1970s. When asked why he waited 25 years to release an album under his own name, he replied: "I guess I never got around to it and never had enough confidence in myself to push it." Regarding the album title, he commented: "I'm constantly being challenged to be better. I've learned that the ultimate frontier is really myself."

== Reception ==
Professional ratings
Review scores
Source	Rating
AllMusic	4/5 stars
MusicHound Jazz	4/5 stars
The Penguin Guide to Jazz Recordings	3/4 stars

In a review for AllMusic, Chris Kelsey called Ultimate Frontier "a very fine album," and wrote: "Brown's music has come to light fairly late in the game -- which is a blessing for his listeners, in a way. For it's an extremely rare delight in these youth-obsessed times to happen upon, for the first time, such a wonderfully creative artist so fully-developed."

In MusicHound Jazz: The Essential Album Guide, David C. Gross and Steve Holtje noted that Brown's "tenor is strong and vibrant and he goes outside with his alto, particularly on 'Lester Bowie's Gumbo Stew'." They described "One for Luba" as "a beautiful ballad creating an air of sadness."

Neil Tesser of the Chicago Reader described the album as "a rollicking, flavorful tour de force sustained by a soulful spirituality," and suggested that Kirk Brown's piano playing "blooms above the same muscular base that underlies Ari's work."

The authors of The Penguin Guide to Jazz Recordings called the album a blend of "big, beefy ballad performance[s]" and an "unmistakable Chicagoan stew of churning post-bop." However, they remarked: "Taken a piece at a time, this is quite exciting but listeners may find themselves rather weatherbeaten by the end of it."

== Track listing ==
- "Motherless Child" is a traditional spiritual. Remaining tracks were composed by Ari Brown.
1. "Big V" – 5:15
2. "Lester Bowie's Gumbo Stew" – 10:37
3. "One for Luba" – :30
4. "Meeting Time" – 6:05
5. "Ultimate Frontier" – 11:36
6. "Sincerity" – 5:11
7. "Motherless Child" – 10:04

== Personnel ==
- Ari Brown – alto saxophone, tenor saxophone, soprano saxophone, flute, piano
- Kirk Brown – piano
- Yosef Ben Israel – double bass
- Avreeayl Ra – drums
- Dr. Cuz, Enoch – percussion (track 2)
