= Live at the River East Art Center =

Live album by Kahil El'Zabar's Ritual Trio with special guest Billy Bang
- Released: May 17, 2005
- Recorded: December 18, 2004
- Venue: River East Art Center, Chicago, IL
- Genre: Jazz
- Length: 67:18
- Label: Delmark; DE-566
- Producer: Kahil El'Zabar, Robert G. Koester, Steve Wagner

Kahil El'Zabar chronology
We Is (2004)	Live at the River East Art Center (2005)	Big M: A Tribute to Malachi Favors (2006)

Billy Bang chronology
Configuration (2004)	Live at the River East Art Center (2005)	Above and Beyond: An Evening in Grand Rapids (2007)

Live at the River East Art Center is a live album by Kahil El'Zabar's Ritual Trio, with special guest violinist Billy Bang, that was recorded in Chicago in 2004 and released on the Delmark label.

== Reception ==
Professional ratings
Review scores
Source	Rating
AllMusic	3.5/5 stars
All About Jazz	4/5 stars
The Penguin Guide to Jazz Recordings	4/4 stars

In his review for AllMusic, Michael G. Nastos notes "This recording for El'Zabar and his revamped trio including longtime member saxophonist Ari Brown and guest violinist Billy Bang is the first offering with bassist Yosef Ben Israel filling the chair of the late Favors. Because the unit was so reliant on the witty and unique elegance of Favors, not to mention his good humor, the band is at once somber and joyous, mourning his departure and celebrating his rich and wonderful artistic life. This live performance at the River East Art Center in Chicago sports a production value that also reflects the mood of the band -- a bit detached and thin, but full of spirit, body, and true reverence for their great friend". On All About Jazz, Michael McCaw said "this is an album of beautifully engaging music that allows for joyous deep listening and bodily movement. Everyone, particularly Bang, sounds inspired, and this disc ought to whet appetites for the group's next Delmark release, Big M, A Tribute to Malachi Favors, recorded the same week".

== Track listing ==
All compositions by Kahil El'Zabar except where noted

1. "Big M" – 20:27
2. "Return of the Lost Tribe" – 13:04
3. "Where Do You Want to Go?" (Ari Brown) – 12:41
4. "Be Exciting (Kahil Testifies)" – 4:39
5. "Oof" – 16:27

== Personnel ==
- Kahil El'Zabar – kalimba, drums, percussion
- Ari Brown – tenor saxophone
- Yosef Ben Israel – bass
- Billy Bang – electric violin
