= Renaissance of the Resistance =

Studio album by Kahil El'Zabar
- Released: 1994
- Recorded: November 29 & 30, 1993
- Studio: Riverside, Chicago
- Genre: Jazz
- Length: 60:04
- Label: Delmark
- Producer: Steve Wagner

Kahil El'Zabar chronology
Dance with the Ancestors (1993)	Renaissance of the Resistance (1994)	Big Cliff (1995)

Renaissance of the Resistance is an album by American jazz percussionist Kahil El'Zabar and his Ritual Trio, which also includes saxophonist Ari Brown and bassist Malachi Favors. It was recorded in 1993 and released on Delmark.

== Reception ==
Professional ratings
Review scores
Source	Rating
AllMusic	4/5 stars
DownBeat	4/5 stars
The Penguin Guide to Jazz Recordings	3.5/4 stars

In his review for AllMusic, Alex Henderson states "This CD underscores the fact that not all avant-garde jazz is atonal free jazz; on the whole, this is quite musical and melodic."

The DownBeat review by Larry Birnbaum says, "Renaissance of the Resistance redefines the mainstream with wry turns, sly nods, and subtle winks, and its nostalgia extends from Africa to the avant garde."

== Track listing ==
All compositions by Kahil El'Zabar except as indicated

1. "Sweet Meat" – 6:16
2. "Ornette" – 9:06
3. "Renaissance of the Resistance" – 10:27
4. "Trane in Mind" – 8:01
5. "Golden Sea" – 7:56
6. "Fatsmo" (Ari Brown) – 13:41
7. "Save Your Love for Me" (Buddy Johnson) – 4:37

== Personnel ==
- Kahil El'Zabar – drums, thumb piano, vocal
- Ari Brown – saxophones
- Malachi Favors – bass
