= Min Xiao-Fen =

Chinese-American pipa player and singer

Min Xiao-Fen (simplified Chinese: 闵小芬; traditional Chinese: 閔小芬; pinyin: Mǐn Xiǎofēn) is a Chinese and American pipa player, vocalist, and composer known for her work in traditional Chinese music, contemporary classical music, and jazz.

== Life ==
Min Xiao-Fen studied with her father, Min Jiqian (闵季骞), a music professor at Nanjing University and a student of the erhu master Liu Tianhua. Her eldest sister, Min Huifen, was nicknamed the "Queen of Erhu." Her brother, Min Lekang (闵乐康), is a national first-class conductor and music professor.

Min performed as a pipa soloist for the Nanjing National Music Orchestra from 1980 to 1992. She emigrated to the United States in 1992, first settling in San Francisco, California.

She has worked with numerous contemporary composers, including Chen Yi, Zhou Long, Carl Stone, Anthony De Ritis, Marc Battier, and John Zorn. She has worked with the jazz saxophonist Jane Ira Bloom and in 2021 with Jazz guitarist Rez Abbasi on her album White Lotus. Min worked with Björk on the song "I See Who You Are" on Björk's album Volta, released on May 7, 2007.

Min lives in New York. She is also a founder of Blue Pipa, Inc.

== Discography ==
- Mao, Monk and Me (2017, Blue Pipa)
- Dim Sum (2012, Blue Pipa)
- The Art of Improvisation (2005, Mutable Music) with Leroy Jenkins's Driftwood
- Min Xiao-Fen with Six Composers (1998, Avant)
- Viper – Derek Bailey and Min Xiao-Fen (1998, Avant)
- Spring, River, Flower, Moon, Night (1997, Asphodel)
- The Moon Rising (1996, Cala)
- Socket (Amulet)
