= We Is =

Live album by Kahil El'Zabar & David Murray
- Released: 2004
- Recorded: March 29, 2000
- Venue: The Bop Shop, Rochester, New York
- Genre: Jazz
- Length: 61:09
- Label: Delmark
- Producer: Robert G. Koester

Kahil El'Zabar chronology
If You Believe (2002)	We Is (2004)	Live at the River East Art Center (2005)

We Is is an album by American jazz percussionist Kahil El'Zabar and saxophonist David Murray, which was recorded live in 2000 at the Bop Shop record store in Rochester and released on Delmark.

== Reception ==
Professional ratings
Review scores
Source	Rating
AllMusic	4/5 stars
The Penguin Guide to Jazz Recordings	3/4 stars

In his review for AllMusic, Scott Yanow states "This adventurous and well-constructed live set holds one's interest throughout and is well worth several listens."

The JazzTimes review by Chris Kelsey notes "Murray's been hotter, but it's great to hear him again in a stripped-down context. And it's great to hear El'Zabar, period."

== Track listing ==
All compositions by Kahil El'Zabar except as indicated

1. "Groove Allure" – 14:03
2. "We Is" (El'Zabar / Murray) – 9:32
3. "Blues Affirmation" – 18:03
4. "One World Family" (El'Zabar / Murray) – 10:56
5. "Sweet Meat" – 8:35

== Personnel ==
- Kahil El'Zabar – drums, percussion
- David Murray – tenor sax, bass clarinet
