= Hang Tuff =

Studio album by Ethnic Heritage Ensemble
- Released: 1991
- Recorded: November 27, 1990
- Studio: ACME Recording, Chicago
- Genre: Jazz
- Length: 60:39
- Label: Open Minds
- Producer: Pedro de Freitas

Kahil El'Zabar chronology
Alika Rising (1990)	Hang Tuff (1991)	Dance with the Ancestors (1993)

Hang Tuff is an album by Ethnic Heritage Ensemble, a jazz band formed by percussionist Kahil El'Zabar, who is joined by saxophonist Edward Wilkerson and trombonist Joseph Bowie. It was recorded in 1990 and released on the German Open Minds label.

== Reception ==
Professional ratings
Review scores
Source	Rating
The Penguin Guide to Jazz	3.5/4 stars

The Penguin Guide to Jazz states "Hang Tuff has a quiet, chamberish quality which suggests that the horn players felt slightly constrained by El'Zabar's concentration on texture."

== Track listing ==
All compositions by Kahil El'Zabar except as indicated

1. "Hang Tuff" – 9:58
2. "Bobo" (Joseph Bowie) – 12:07
3. "Afro Slick" – 7:28
4. "Peace on Earth" – 8:05
5. "Trane in Mind" – 9:21
6. "Indestructible Consciousness" – 13:40

== Personnel ==
- Kahil El'Zabar – trap and earth drums, sanza, ankle bells, vocals
- Edward Wilkerson – alto sax, tenor sax, clarinet, piano, percussion
- Joseph Bowie – trombone, congas
