= Robert Irving III =

American musician (born 1953)

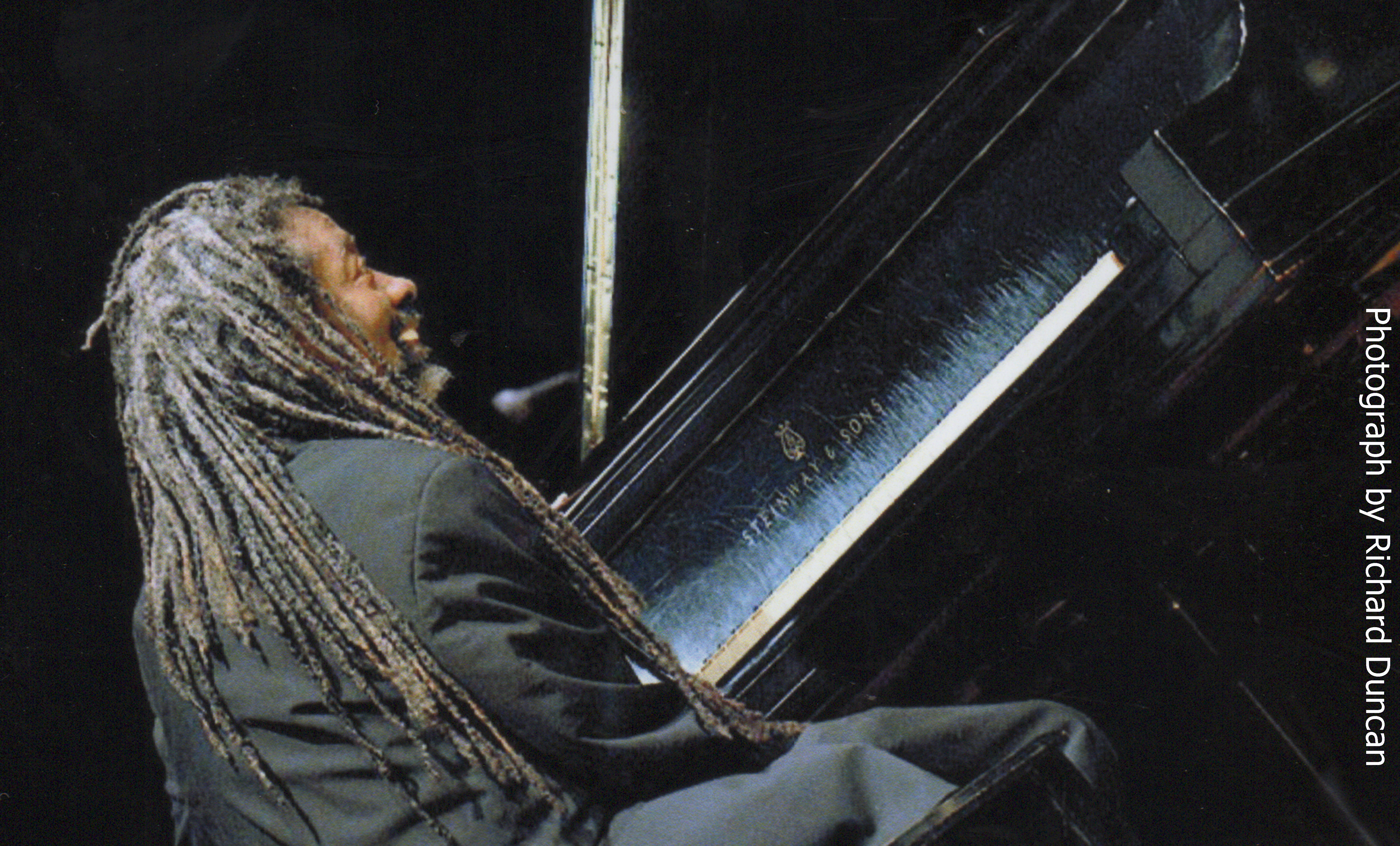

Background information
- Born: October 27, 1953 (age 72)
- Origin: Chicago, Illinois, U.S.
- Genres: Jazz; R&B; contemporary gospel
- Occupation: Musician
- Instrument: Keyboards
- Years active: 1979–present
- Label: Verve Forecast
- Website: sonicportraitsjazz.com

Robert Irving III (born October 27, 1953) is an American pianist, composer, arranger and music educator.

A native of Chicago, Irving was one of a group of young Chicago musicians that, in the late '70s and early '80s, formed the nucleus of Miles Davis' recording and touring bands. Irving left the Davis band in 1989, and has gone on to a prolific career as a touring musician, composer, arranger, producer, educator and interdisciplinary artist. Irving resumed his career as a recording artist under his own name with the 2007 release of New Momentum and more recently with the release of "Our Space In Time" by Robert Irving III Generations (featuring students Irving mentored through the Jazz Institute of Chicago Jazz Links program).

== Early background ==
Irving's first musical instrument was the bugle, followed by a range of brass instruments, including cornet, French horn, and valve trombone. While he was a brass player, Irving also studied piano to further his knowledge of musical theory.

Irving's family moved to North Carolina in 1969 and remained there until 1978. While in North Carolina, Irving continued his studies in musical theory, played trombone in concert bands, keyboards for pop/funk and fusion bands, and organ and piano for gospel groups. The Hammond organ and keyboards became his primary instruments.

After returning to Chicago in 1978, Irving connected with a number of young musicians, including Vince Wilburn Jr. and Darryl Jones who would later join him in the Miles Davis band. These musicians formed a series of bands, including Data and AL7. In 1979, AL7 was invited by arranger/producer Tom Tom 84 to record some demo tapes for Maurice White (of Earth, Wind, & Fire).

== The Miles Davis connection ==
In 1980, an Irving composition entitled Space was played for Wilburn's uncle, Miles Davis. Space captured Davis' interest, and led to Irving, Wilburn and their band being invited to New York for Davis' first recording sessions in several years.

The fruits of these sessions were included on the 1981 album, The Man with the Horn, the first recording Davis had released in six years. The title track, The Man With the Horn, was co-written and arranged by Irving, who also co-wrote and arranged another track titled Shout.

Returning to Chicago, Irving continued his composing, arranging, and producing; notably working on albums for Ramsey Lewis (1981 and 1982), Randy Hall, and others.

Also, in 1982, Irving became musical director and pianist for the Kuumba Theater production of The Little Dreamer… a Nite in the Life of Bessie Smith and studied stride-piano with the legendary Little Brother Montgomery, who had composed music for the show.

Then, in 1983, Davis invited Irving to once again return to work with him as composer, arranger and co-producer.

== The Davis–Irving collaborations ==
The initial Miles Davis–Robert Irving III collaboration resulted in the album Decoy. Irving then joined Davis' touring band, where he remained for five years, holding the keyboard chair and the role of musical director.

Notably, in the role of musical director, Irving was responsible for musical arrangements, rehearsals (which Davis never attended), and musical liaison between Davis and group members that included some of the leading musicians of the era, such as Al Foster, John Scofield, Bill Evans, Mike Stern, Gary Thomas, Bob Berg, Kenny Garrett, Hiram Bullock, Robben Ford, Joseph "Foley" McCreary and Darryl Jones. In those roles, Irving listened to recordings of each night's performance with Davis to cull what were spontaneous creative ideas ... that then became a permanent part of the group's musical arrangements. Some of that work is finely exhibited in The Complete Miles Davis at Montreux collection.

Irving also collaborated with Davis (as composer, producer and arranger) on the 1985 recording You're Under Arrest. The album included Grammy-nominated covers of “Time After Time” and “Human Nature.”

While working on the material for You're Under Arrest, Irving added to his arranging credentials by studying with Gil Evans, who, decades earlier, had famously arranged some of Miles Davis’ most celebrated recordings.

Later, Irving extended this musical direction on projects such as his film score for the feature film Street Smart also with André Lassalle on guitar (1985), starring Morgan Freeman and Christopher Reeve—with Miles Davis as featured instrumentalist.

Irving remained with the Davis band until 1989, remaining close to Davis until Davis’ death in 1991.

Irving is also a painter. When he was a member of Miles Davis’ band, Davis encouraged him to take up painting. Irving actually began painting regularly in 1997 and has seen his work exhibited in a number of galleries.

== Musician, bandleader, producer, composer, arranger ==
Since leaving the Davis band, Irving has been based in Chicago and has kept active on many musical fronts, continuing to develop as a pianist, arranger, composer and producer. He has performed, as leader and sideman, with a list of musicians that includes David Murray, Wallace Roney, Eddie Henderson, Lenny White, and fellow Miles Davis alumni Darryl Jones, Vince Wilburn Jr., and Al Foster. He has contributed to these settings as a composer, arranger and pianist.

Irving released his first solo album in 1988, Midnight Dream, which featured John Scofield, Darryl Jones, Buddy Williams, André Lassalle and Phil Perry.

In addition, Irving recorded as leader and music director of the Davis alumni bands ESP and ESP2, on a number of David Murray albums, as a member of Khalil El Zabar's Juba Collective, and with Wallace Roney. He has produced albums for, among others, Terri Lyne Carrington (Real Life Story, 1990) and More to Say (Real Life Story: NextGen.) (E1 Entertainment, 2009). In the Chicago community, Irving has taught and lectured at numerous schools, workshops and community events. He founded Chicago's African Arts Ensemble (an 18-piece pan-African jazz group commissioned by the African Festival of the Arts).

Irving also composed the score for George Tillman, Jr.'s 1995 feature film, Scenes for the Soul, and, composed for the Miami Chamber Symphony (Mademoiselle Mandarin, a concerto for jazz harp and orchestra, featuring Swiss harpist, Markus Klinko).

== 2006-2007: New Momentum ==
With the 2007 release of New Momentum on the Sonic Portraits Entertainment label, Irving returned to recording under his own name. The CD was co-produced by Terri Lyne Carrington. The CD is a Billboard Magazine "critics' choice" (highly recommended for musical merit). An excerpt of a The Billboard Review article - April 7, 2007 (by Dan Ouellette):

Conspicuously absent as a leader since serving as Miles Davis’ fusion-oriented musical director in the ‘80s, Robert Irving III returns in dramatic fashion on “New Momentum,” the premiere release for indie Sonic Portraits.

The disc is largely an acoustic piano trio date, highlighted by Irving originals and two nods to his mentor’s ‘60s repertoire: a buoyant cover of Davis’ “Seven Steps to Heaven” and a refined take on Wayne Shorter’s “Nefertiti”.

What’s so remarkable about Irving’s return from obscurity is the fresh, vital sound spurred by his pianistic dynamism, and infused with an imaginative improvisational approach that encompasses dancing tempo shifts and harmonic curves.

Bassist Buster Williams costars, with arco support on the ballad “Primordial Waters”, low-end punch to the title track and a walking bass conversation with Irving on the midtempo groove tune “Always . . . Sometimes”.

== Sketches of Brazil ==
Robert Irving III conducted the debut performance of his “Sonic Portraits Orchestra” in the world premiere of “Sketches of Brazil to a record crowd of 12,500 people, receiving several standing ovations. The piece is his orchestral homage to his mentors, Miles Davis and Gil Evans, on the 50th anniversary of the recording of the pair’s classic, “Sketches of Spain.” The performance on the Jay Pritzker Pavilion stage at Millennium Park, in Chicago on Thursday, August 13, 2009, featured trumpeter Wallace Roney as the principal soloist, and classical guitarist Fareed Haque as special guest, along with Brazilian percussionists Dede Sampaio and Felipe Fraga, along with Miles Evans on trumpet in the orchestra (son of Gil Evans) in a blend of 33 classical and jazz musicians conducted by Irving at times from the piano. The Jazz Institute of Chicago sponsored a Symposium prior to the event with special guests from the families of Miles Davis and Gil Evans. Chicago Tribune Critic Howard Reich said of Irving's work, “Extraordinarily ambitious… a tour de force of orchestral writing.” This project, although videotaped with five cameras and professional audio recording, has not yet been released.

== 2015: Our Space In Time ==
This is the third album released under the name Robert Irving III Generations as a special group co-founded by Irving's wife, Lolo Irving, in 2014, featuring young musicians Irving mentored. The CD that entered the CMJ Chart at 30 and rose to 63 on the top 100 Jazz Week Chart consists of 10 original compositions of Irving, four of which came to him in dreams.

== Recent ==
Irving currently tours with the Miles Electric Band (consisting of mostly Miles alums) as the music director/pianist and keyboardist.

The Robert Irving III Quintet debuted at the historicJoe Segal's The Jazz Showcase in Chicago in September 2017. That Quintet included on trumpet Wallace Roney Jr., the son of Geri Allen and Wallace Roney, along with Rajiv Halim on tenor, alto and soprano saxophones and flute, bassist Emma Dayhuff and 17-year drummer, Jeremiah Collier. In 2021, Irving brought both a band and some of his paintings to Chicago's Old Town School of Folk Music for a double-artist show and concert with Jon Langford.

== Discography ==
=== As leader ===
- Midnight Dream (Polygram, 1988)
- Morning Sunlight (Sonic Portraits, 1999)
- New Momentum (Sonic Portraits, 2006)
- Our Space In Time (Sonic Portraits, 2015)

=== As producer ===
- Holy Ghost Power (single) Clarkwise (Omnific Music, 2016)
- Our Space In Time (Sonic Portraits, 2015)
- Continuation Peter Lerner (Origin Records, 2014
- Circle Without End Frank Russell with Wallace Roney, Darryl Jones (Sonic Portraits, 2013)
- The Drive Jazz Links Ensemble (JICSAR, 2011)
- It's Time Kahil El Zabar’s Ethnic Featuring Nona Hendryx (Katalyst Entertainment, 2011)
- The Christ-Mas Song (single) Clarkwise (Omnific Music, 2010)
- Real Life Story (More To Know) Terri Lynn Carrington with Nancy Wilson, George Duke, Patrice Rushen (Koch, 2009)
- Miles From India Various Artist -Grammy Nominee (Times Square Records, 2008)
- Spring Thing Ken Chaney (ARR 2008)
- Rhapsody In Hughes 101 Val Gray Ward (Kumi Entertainment, 2005)
- Heru Em Medu Rey Kemet (Songs In The Language of Kemet) African Arts Ensemble Chicago-Commission from African Festival of the Arts (Sonic Portraits, 2003)
- Pieces Of Marlene Rosenberg, Robert Irving III Associate Producer-and creator of cover art (Bassline Ent. 2001)
- Flattering Secret Ron Friedman (Secret Jazz 1999)
- Full Circle Robert Irving III & Chris Murrell Live in Hamburg, Germany (Nagel Heyer Records GmbH, 1998)
- Ascension Yuuka Nobe (Pony Canyon, 1998)
- ESP ESP with Darryl Jones, Kirk Whalum, Toby Williams and Bobby Broom (Glass House-Pioneer LDC. Japan, 1994)
- Wabi Susan Osborn/NEC Avenue Ltd. (Nippon Music Award "Best Creative Concept") 1992
- Real Life Story Terri Lyne Carrington -Grammy Award Nominee (Verve Forecast-Polygram, 1989)
- Midnight Dream Robert Irving III -debut release(Verve Forecast-Polygram, 1988)
- You're Under Arrest Miles Davis -Grammy Award Nomination for single “Human Nature” (Columbia, 1984) *Ransom Tony Ransom (Bill Board Magazine "Pick") Singles: “Turn To Me” and “Stay If You Wanna” (Expansion Records Ltd, 1985)
- Decoy Miles Davis -Downbeat Award for Album of the Year (Columbia, 1984)

=== As musician, composer, arranger ===
With Miles Davis

- The Man with the Horn (Columbia, 1981) - composer, arranger, keyboards
- Decoy (Columbia, 1984) - composer, keyboards
- Live Around The World (Warner, 1996) - keyboards
- The Complete Miles Davis at Montreux (Columbia, 2002) - composer, arranger, keyboards
- The Prince of Darkness - Live in Europe (Immortal, 2005) - DVD-Video. composer, arranger, keyboards.

With Ramsey Lewis

- Three Piece Suite (Columbia, 1981) - composer, arranger, keyboards
- Chance Encounter (Columbia, 1982) - composer, arranger, keyboards
- Live at the Savoy (Columbia, 1982) - composer, arranger, keyboards

With David Murray

- The Tip (DIW, 1995)
- Jug-A-Lug (DIW, 1995)
- Dark Star: The Music of the Grateful Dead (Astor Place, 1996)
- Fo Deuk Revue (Justin Time, 1997)

With Wallace Roney

- Village (Warner Bros., 1997)
- Jazz (Highnote, 2007)

Other recordings

- V.A. — Endless Miles: a tribute to Miles Davis (N2K Encoded Music, 1998)
- Juba Collective — Juba Collective (Premonition, 2002) — piano, organ, keyboards
- Corey Wilkes — Drop It (Delmark, 2008) — composer, arranger, keyboards
- Kahil El'Zabar's Ethnics featuring Nona Hendryx — It's Time (Katalyst, 2011) – composer, arranger, producer, keyboards

=== Awards ===
Robert Irving III is a recipient of the Chicago Music Awards, and Lifetime Achievement Award for 2015

=== Memoir ===
Excerpts from Robert Irving III's memoir, entitled, "Harmonic Possibilities" were published by New York University's Institute of African-American Affairs publication Black Renaissance Noire Magazine in the Fall 2013 issue. The memoir is still being completed.
