= Humility in the Light of the Creator =

Studio album by Maurice McIntyre
- Released: 1969
- Recorded: February 5 & 25, 1969
- Studio: Ter-Mar Studio, Chicago
- Genre: Jazz
- Length: 37:22
- Label: Delmark; DS-419
- Producer: Robert G. Koester

Maurice McIntyre chronology
Humility in the Light of the Creator (1969)	Forces and Feelings (1970)

Humility in the Light of the Creator is the debut album by the American jazz saxophonist Maurice McIntyre recorded in 1969 and released by the Delmark label.

== Reception ==
Professional ratings
Review scores
Source	Rating
AllMusic	4.5/5 stars
The Penguin Guide to Jazz Recordings	3/4 stars
The Encyclopedia of Popular Music	3/5 stars

AllMusic reviewer Alex Henderson stated "Spirituality is a big part of Kalaparusha Maurice McIntyre's Humility in the Light of the Creator, a superb inside/outside date that is arguably his finest, most essential album. Recorded in 1969, this AACM classic owes a lot to the spiritual music of the Middle East, Asia, and Africa, and there are times when the Chicago saxophonist also blends avant-garde jazz with Native American elements. ... Humility is often dissonant without ever being claustrophobic. ... McIntyre has a lot to be proud of, but if you were limited to owning only one of his albums, Humility would be the best choice".

On All About Jazz, Derek Taylor said "Humility may have been McInytre's first session as a leader, but the music and musicianship yield the mark of a completely mature player from the outset. Adding to the indispensability of the date is a who's who of AACM heavyweights on hand to lend their talents to the already boiling creative pool".

JazzTimes' Duck Baker noted "most listeners will have heard enough of the chanting style of George Hines after one track on Humility in the Light of the Creator and, unfortunately, there are three in total, none of which get easier to listen to with the passage of time. This was an LP that got worn out on one side, as everything else about it is great. The long concluding suite is a knockout; it features such luminaries as Leo Smith, Malachi Favors, John Stubblefield and pianist Amina Claudine Myers. McIntyre's tenor style is strong and well defined. The good stuff here is worth hearing; just use the skip button for the others".

== Track listing ==
All compositions by Maurice McIntyre

1. "Suite: Ensemble Love - Hexagon" – 1:03
2. "Suite: Ensemble Love - Kcab Emoh" – 5:23
3. "Suite: Ensemble Love - Pluto Calling" – 2:22
4. "Suite: Ensemble Love - Life Force" – 3:52
5. "Suite: Ensemble Love - Humility in the Light of the Creator" – 2:51
6. "Suite: Ensemble Fate - Family Tree / Say a Prayer for / Out Here (If Anyone Should Call) / Melissa / Bismillah" – 19:45

== Personnel ==
- Maurice McIntyre - tenor saxophone, clarinet, horn, bells, tambourine
- Leo Smith – trumpet, flugelhorn (track 6)
- John Stubblefield – soprano saxophone (track 6)
- Amina Claudine Myers – piano (track 6)
- Malachi Favors, Mchaka Uba – bass
- Ajaramu, Thurman Barker – drums
- George Hines – vocals (tracks 1–5)
