= Return of the Lost Tribe =

1998 studio album by Bright Moments

Studio album by Bright Moments: Joseph Jarman, Kalaparusha Maurice McIntyre, Kahil El'Zabar, Malachi Favors and Steve Colson
- Released: 1998
- Recorded: December 21 & 22, 1997
- Studio: Riverside, Chicago, IL
- Genre: Jazz
- Length: 59:13
- Label: OmniTone; 12001
- Producer: Kahil El'Zabar, Robert G. Koester, Steve Wagner

Joseph Jarman chronology
Out of the Mist (1997)	Return of the Lost Tribe (1998)	Equal Interest (1999)

Kalaparusha Maurice McIntyre chronology
Ram's Run (1981)	Return of the Lost Tribe (1998)	Dream Of... (1998)

Kahil El'Zabar chronology
Jitterbug Junction (1997)	Return of the Lost Tribe (1998)	Papa's Bounce (1998)

Return of the Lost Tribe is an album by Bright Moments, a collaborative project by saxophonists Joseph Jarman and Kalaparusha Maurice McIntyre, percussionist Kahil El'Zabar, bassist Malachi Favors and pianist Adegoke Steve Colson, recorded in 1997 and released on the Delmark label.

== Reception ==
Professional ratings
Review scores
Source	Rating
AllMusic	4.5/5 stars

In his review for AllMusic, Michael G. Nastos stated: "This is a landmark recording for these five individuals who come together in so many real and important musical ways. It is, for listeners of this type of improvised music, a definitive recording, and one of the best of 1998".

Writing for JazzTimes, Tom Terrell commented: "these jazz griots have come up with some of the best music of their lives. ROTLT's seven tracks are overflowing with evocative moments... and improvisational epiphanies... This is no last hurrah; this is a new day."

The Washington Post's Christopher Porter noted that "Bright Moments is dedicated to recapturing the original spirit and energy of the AACM--before its members are too old to do so," and wrote: "While nothing on Return of the Lost Tribe recasts the sonic density of early AACM recordings... Bright Moments is a glistening reminder of their blazing spirit."

== Track listing ==
1. "Return of the Lost Tribe" (Kahil El'Zabar) – 10:09
2. "Song of Joy for the Predestined" (Joseph Jarman) – 8:06
3. "Kudus" (Jarman) – 8:37
4. "Dance'm" (El'Zabar) – 8:25
5. "Fragmentation - Prayer at Twilight" (Adegoke Steve Colson) – 8:02
6. "Ornette" (El'Zabar) – 8:00
7. "Dream of" (Kalaparusha Maurice McIntyre) – 9:37

== Personnel ==
- Joseph Jarman – flute, alto saxophone, recitation
- Kalaparusha Maurice McIntyre – tenor saxophone
- Adegoke Steve Colson – piano
- Malachi Favors – bass
- Kahil El'Zabar – drums, percussion, voice
