= Conversations (Archie Shepp and Kahil El'Zabar album) =

Studio album by Archie Shepp with Kahil El'Zabar's Ritual Trio
- Released: 1999
- Recorded: January 23 & 24, 1999
- Studio: Riverside, Chicago, IL
- Genre: Jazz
- Length: 60:39
- Label: Delmark; DE-514
- Producer: Kahil El'Zabar, Robert G. Koester

Kahil El'Zabar chronology
Papa's Bounce (1998)	Conversations (1999)	Freedom Jazz Dance (1999)

Archie Shepp chronology
True Blue (1999)	Conversations (1999)	Live in New York (2001)

Conversations is an album by saxophonist Archie Shepp with Kahil El'Zabar's Ritual Trio, which also includes Ari Brown and Malachi Favors, recorded in 1999 and released on the Delmark label.

== Reception ==
Professional ratings
Review scores
Source	Rating
AllMusic	4/5 stars
The Penguin Guide to Jazz Recordings	2/4 stars

In his review for AllMusic, Michael G. Nastos notes, "In a dedication to the late bassist Fred Hopkins, Shepp returns to the recording studio armed with his no-compromise, no-nonsense way of playing the tenor saxophone. It's still as cutting-edge dour as ever, supported by the beautiful underpinnings of the trio ... To say Shepp is back would be shortsighted; he's always been around ... This is a resolute affirmation of his powers, punctuating that he's still a vital force in the new music, as are his backup constituents on this very fine CD, a perfect introduction for the uninitiated and a must-buy for longtime fans" On All About Jazz, Jack Bowers said, "There are few pyrotechnics; much of the music is pensive and sedate, and most of it is melodic as well. While this isn’t the sort of disc I’d run out and buy, there are many who would, and to them I would unreservedly recommend it".

== Track listing ==
All compositions by Kahil El'Zabar except where noted

1. "Conversation; the Introduction" – 8:11
2. "Big Fred" – 8:20
3. "Kari" – 8:30
4. "Whenever I Think of You" (Ari Brown) – 9:27
5. "Conversations; the Dialogue" – 10:11
6. "Brother Malcolm" – 8:18
7. "Revelations" – 7:42

== Personnel ==
- Archie Shepp – tenor saxophone, piano
- Kahil El'Zabar – drums
- Ari Brown – piano, tenor saxophone
- Malachi Favors – bass
