= Spirits Entering =

Studio album by Kahil El'Zabar and Billy Bang
- Released: 2001
- Recorded: May 24 and 25, 1998
- Studio: Riverside Studio, Chicago
- Genre: Free jazz
- Length: 59:46
- Label: Delmark Records; DE-533
- Producer: Kahil El'Zabar, Robert G. Koester

Kahil El'Zabar chronology
One World Family (2000)	Spirits Entering (2001)	Love Outside of Dreams (2002)

Spirits Entering is an album by percussionist Kahil El'Zabar and violinist Billy Bang. It was recorded during May 1998 at Riverside Studio in Chicago, and was released in 2001 by Delmark Records.

== Reception ==
Professional ratings
Review scores
Source	Rating
AllMusic	4/5 stars
The Penguin Guide to Jazz	3/4 stars
Tom Hull – on the Web	A−

In a review for AllMusic, Alex Henderson wrote that El'Zabar and Bang "enjoy a strong rapport and bring out the best in one another," and commented: "the musicians favor an inside/outside approach and provide an album that is left of center but still quite musical... Those who have enjoyed El'Zabar's work with the Ritual Trio and the Ethnic Heritage Ensemble will also find a great deal to admire about Spirits Entering."

The authors of The Penguin Guide to Jazz Recordings stated that the album "has some splendid music, though it's compromised a little by the dry and thin tone the violinist gets. El'Zabar makes enough noise to drown him out at times, but in the more mellifluous passages it's a fine match."

Critic Tom Hull noted that El'Zabar's "everyday-from-everywhere beats form a fascinating backdrop" for Bang, who has "rarely enjoyed so much space, and responds with touching eloquence."

John Litweiler of JazzTimes remarked: "once you adjust to the unusual instrumentation, the music proves engaging, often charming and clever... Much of this album's variety results from the songs [El'Zabar] composed and from his playing with or against Bang; these two musicians have a pleasing give-and-take."

Writing for All About Jazz, Bernie Koenig called the album "highly recommended," and a "truly great example of what a duo is all about," and stated that the musicians "create incredible moods and, on any and all levels, incredible music." AAJ's Derek Taylor commented: "while some of material may seem familiar the stripped down improvisatory setting and the fertile ingenuity of the two men make the session seem fresh." Another AAJ reviewer remarked: "having played together off and on for 25 years, these two musicians have come to develop an intuitive sense for each other's ideas and feelings. They play as one to make possible a ritual music with deep musical and extra-musical consequences."

In an article for One Final Note, Scott Hreha wrote: "even if the percussionist's penchant for revisiting some of his tried and true compositions dilutes a degree of spontaneity from the disc's overall impact, the stripped-down violin/drums format more than makes up for the lack of surprise in the sheer ingenuity with which Bang and El'Zabar pull it off."

== Track listing ==
1. "Spirits Entering" (Bang) – 9:06
2. "Was Now" (El'Zabar) – 4:11
3. "Sweet Irene" (Bang) – 6:32
4. "Love Outside of Dreams" (El'Zabar) – 7:32
5. "The Dream Merchant" (El'Zabar) – 5:06
6. "Song of Myself" (El'Zabar) – 7:36
7. "The Ituri Fantasy" (El'Zabar) – 4:30
8. "Old-Time Religion" (traditional) – 8:35
9. "Golden Sea" (El'Zabar) – 6:11

== Personnel ==
- Kahil El'Zabar – drums, percussion, berimbau, kalimba
- Billy Bang – violin
