= One World Family =

Studio album by Kahil El'Zabar
- Released: 2000
- Recorded: March 28 & 29, 2000
- Studio: Spirit Room, Rossie, New York
- Genre: Jazz
- Length: 69:40
- Label: CIMP
- Producer: Robert D. Rusch

Kahil El'Zabar chronology
| Africa N'Da Blues (2000) | One World Family (2000) | Spirits Entering (2001) |

One World Family is an album by American jazz percussionist Kahil El'Zabar with saxophonist David Murray, which was recorded in 2000 and released on CIMP. They recorded previously the 1989 duo album Golden Sea.

== Reception ==
Professional ratings
Review scores
| Source | Rating |
|---|---|
| AllMusic | 3/5 stars |
| The Penguin Guide to Jazz | 3.5/4 stars |

In his review for AllMusic, Steve Loewy notes "As with other issues on the CIMP label, there are no commercial concessions, and the two musicians achieve a duality in which they often achieve an almost spiritual union."

The Penguin Guide to Jazz states "A lovely session, from the quietly ruminative discourse of 'Ryan' Groove' to the closing optimism of the title track."

The All About Jazz review by Derek Taylor says "This is Soul music, pure and simple. No excess trappings or accoutrements. Just two men opening their minds and hearts in front of the mics and coming up with undiluted aural magic gleaned from a Griot tapestry of traditions."

In his review for JazzTimes Ron Wynn states "One World Family is exquisite, soulful and highly personal music, performed with care and integrity."

== Track listing ==
All compositions by Kahil El'Zabar except as indicated

1. "Ryan's Groove" – 11:08
2. "Serendipitous Journey" – 8:22
3. "Far Too Long" (David Murray) – 10:08
4. "Upsy Daisey" – 6:14
5. "Noodle Doodle take 2" – 7:03
6. "Kelcey's Mystery Oasis" (David Murray) – 6:15
7. "Noodle Doodle take 3" – 5:34
8. "Junction Function" – 7:05
9. "One World Family" – 7:51

== Personnel ==
- Kahil El'Zabar – percussion
- David Murray – tenor sax
