= Peace and Blessings =

Studio album by Kalaparusha Maurice McIntyre
- Released: 1979
- Recorded: June 18, 1979
- Studios: Barigozzi Studio, Milano, Italy
- Genre: Jazz
- Length: 40:28
- Label: Black Saint
- Producer: Giacomo Pellicciotti

Kalaparusha Maurice McIntyre chronology
Forces and Feelings (1970)	Peace and Blessings (1979)	Ram's Run (1981)

Peace and Blessings is an album by the American jazz saxophonist Kalaparusha Maurice McIntyre, recorded in 1979 for the Italian Black Saint label.

== Reception ==
Professional ratings
Review scores
Source	Rating
AllMusic	4/5 stars
The Encyclopedia of Popular Music	4/5 stars
The Penguin Guide to Jazz Recordings	3.5/4 stars
DownBeat	5/5 stars

The editors of AllMusic awarded the album 4 stars, and reviewer Scott Yanow commented: "the emphasis is on intense solos and very free improvising. There is plenty of fire displayed on this spirited set".

The authors of The Penguin Guide to Jazz Recordings wrote: "The album as a whole has the looseness and immediacy of a live set, but is crisply recorded."

Writing for Elsewhere, Graham Reid stated that the musicians "bridge that divide between the grit of innercity urban life and the Indo-influenced cosmic conscious beyond," and remarked: "On this album... the long past of black American jazz is right there as part of whatever moment the players are in, and whatever future might beckon."

== Track listing ==
All compositions by Kalaparusha Maurice McIntyre except as indicated

1. "J & M" - 9:25
2. "African Procesion" - 1:10
3. "Any Way You Want It" (Longineu Parsons) - 9:34
4. "N 39" - 7:22
5. "Not This" - 5:38
6. "Hexagon" - 7:40

- Recorded at Barigozzi Studio in Milano, Italy, on June 18, 1979

== Personnel ==
- Kalaparusha Maurice McIntyre - tenor saxophone, flute, clarinet, bass clarinet, shenai, bells, tambourine, monkey-drum
- Longineu Parsons - trumpet, flugelhorn, flute, sopranino saxophone, soprano saxophone, alto saxophone, recorder
- Leonard Jones - double bass
- King L. Mock - drums
