= Cloud Script =

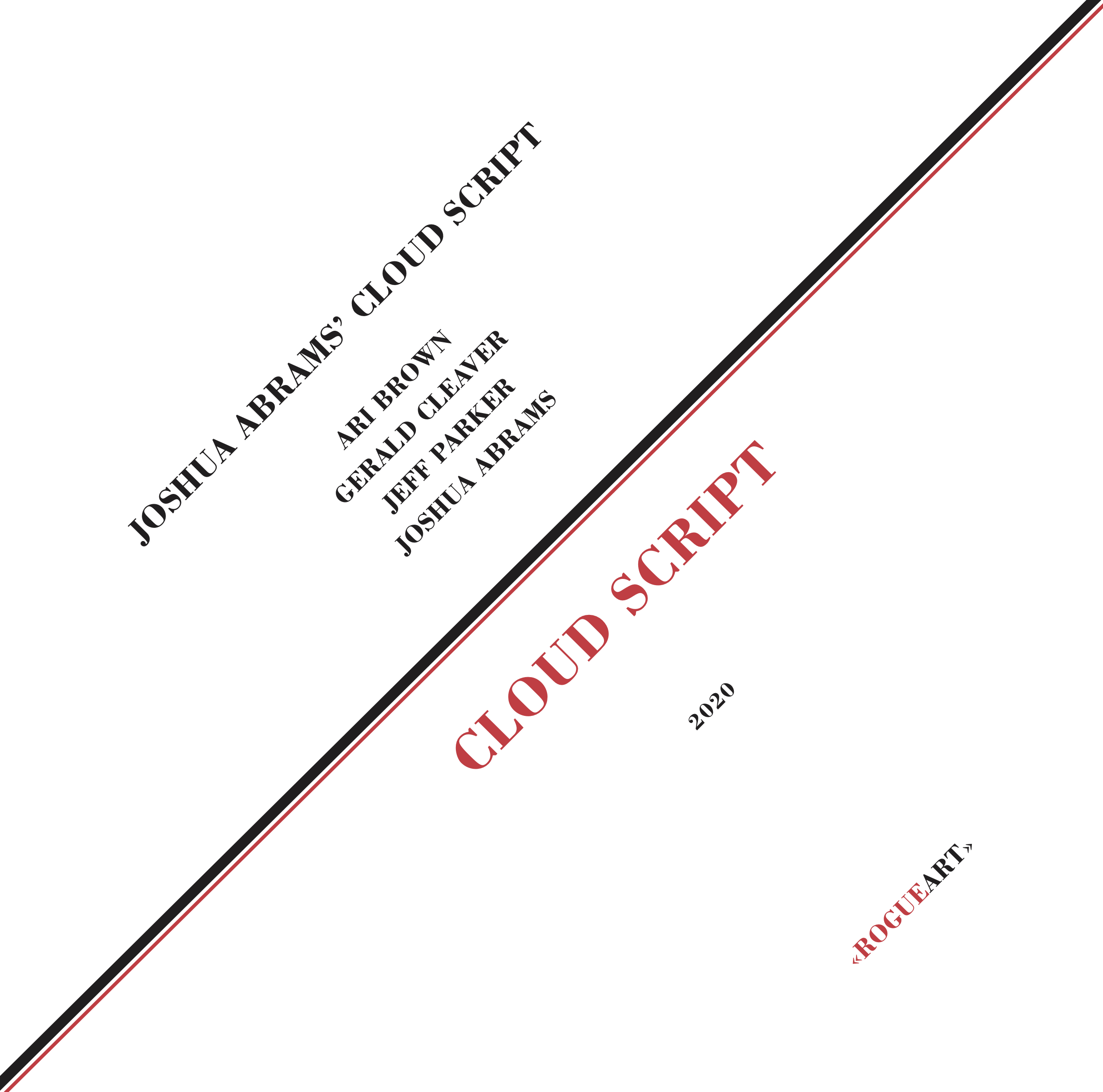
- Vinyl cover artwork

Studio album by Joshua Abrams' Cloud Script
- Released: 2020
- Recorded: September 26, 2016
- Studio: Electrical Audio, Chicago
- Genre: Free jazz
- Label: Rogueart; ROG-0107

Alternative cover
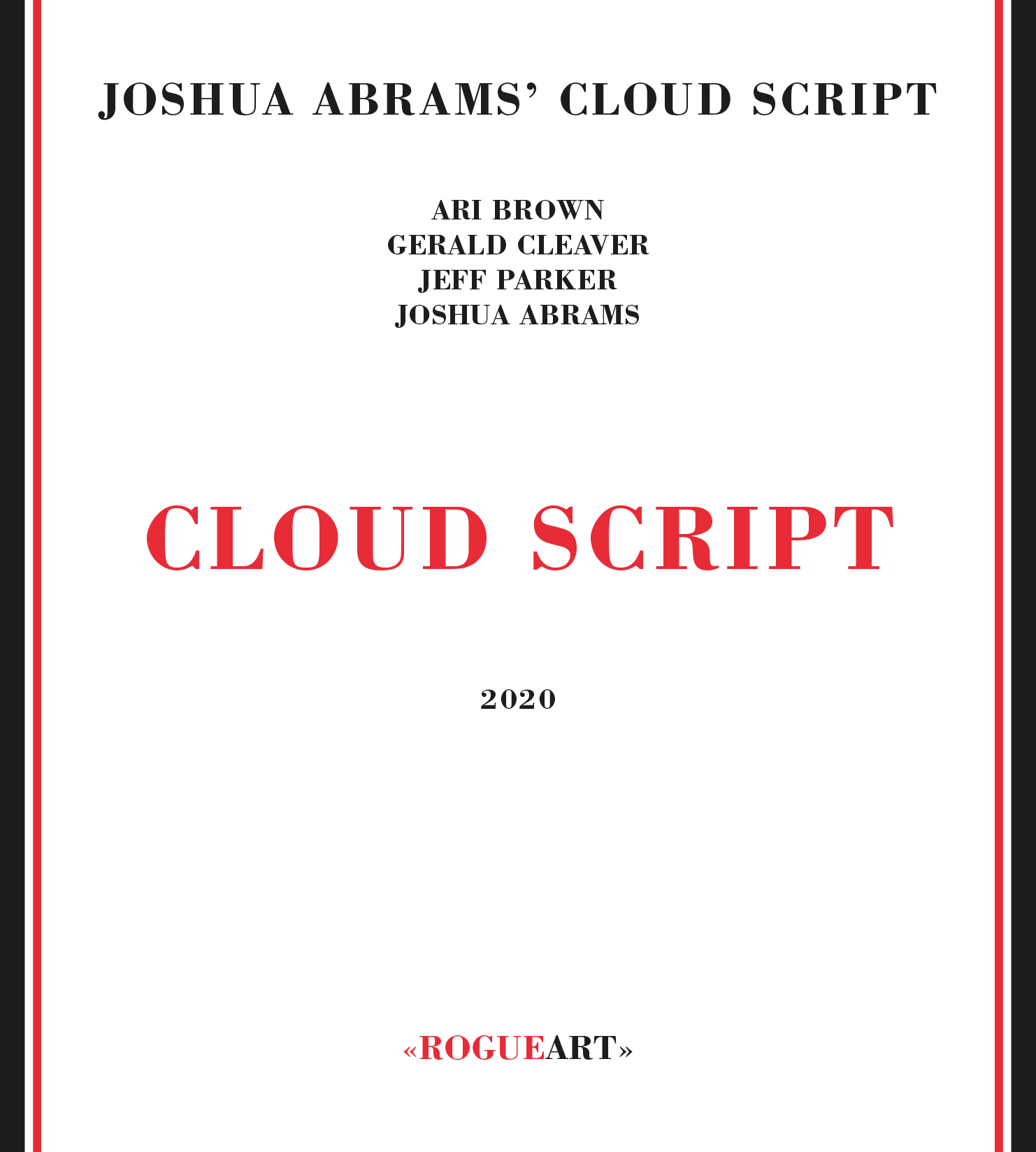
- CD cover artwork

Cloud Script is an album by the free jazz quartet of the same name, led by double bassist and composer Joshua Abrams, and featuring tenor saxophonist Ari Brown, guitarist Jeff Parker, and drummer Gerald Cleaver. Consisting of six original compositions by Abrams, it was recorded on September 26, 2016, at Electrical Audio in Chicago, and was released on vinyl and CD in 2020 by the Rogueart label.

== Reception ==
Professional ratings
Review scores
Source	Rating
All About Jazz	4.5/5 stars
The Free Jazz Collective	4.5/5 stars

In a review for NPR Music, Kevin Whitehead stated that the album's "ego-free sound balance is typical of Joshua Abrams, a sign the music on Cloud Script is less about him than the collective. It's about being part of something bigger, where each player is stronger for all the ways they interlock."

Mark Corroto of All About Jazz wrote: "the quartet eschews independent expression in favour of the ineffable beauty of Abrams' composition. While this might have been planned to be a one-off outing, the music suggests Joshua Abrams' Cloud Script has much more to say."

Dusted Magazine's Bill Meyer noted "the musicians' expressive gifts and empathic connection to each other," and commented: "By conferring the name Cloud Script upon this endeavor, he signals that if there are limits waiting to impede Abrams' music, they're on the other side of the deep blue sky."

Writing for JazzWord, Ken Waxman called the album "A memorable if unexpected CD for those who may have just discovered Abrams," and remarked: "Most of the tracks are fluid with an unfussy groove. They're low key but not cloying and swing subtly, often in tandem with Parker's sometimes jagged and sometimes flowing lines, Cleaver's solid crunches invariably and subtly preserve the rhythm while Abrams contributes spot-on pizzicato pacing or exotically tinged arco inferences."

In an article for The Free Jazz Collective, Anthony Simon described the album as "Warm, soulful," with "a titanic sense of balance," and stated: "Across stylistically diverse narratives, the ensemble is beautifully balanced. Rarely does a single musician feel in the foreground. This degree of balance encourages the listener's attention to distribute across each players' performance, reveling in their combined creation."

== Track listing ==
Composed by Joshua Abrams

1. "In Place of Memory" – 9:10
2. "Harbor" – 5:02
3. "Echo Tracer" – 8:56
4. "Duke Hill" – 5:48
5. "Collapsing Novelty" – 9:29
6. "Coniunctio" – 7:20

== Personnel ==
- Joshua Abrams – double bass
- Ari Brown – tenor saxophone
- Jeff Parker – guitar
- Gerald Cleaver – drums
