= Solo (Leroy Jenkins album) =

Live album by Leroy Jenkins
- Released: 1998
- Recorded: October 24, 1992
- Venue: Contemporary Arts Center, Santa Fe, New Mexico
- Genre: Jazz
- Length: 52:23
- Label: Lovely Music; LCD 3061

Leroy Jenkins chronology
Out of the Mist (1997)	Solo (1998)	Equal Interest (1999)

Solo is a live album by violinist / composer Leroy Jenkins. It was recorded in October 1992 at the Contemporary Arts Center in Santa Fe, New Mexico, and was released by Lovely Music in 1998. The album documents a solo concert that featured nine original compositions, some of which had appeared in his solo performances for years but were never previously recorded, plus pieces by Dizzy Gillespie and John Coltrane. This is Jenkins's second solo record, the first being Solo Concert (India Navigation, 1977).

When asked about his interest in presenting solo recitals, Jenkins acknowledged the influence of Anthony Braxton, stating: "It was his idea at first to do this. You know that recording he did for Delmark? He did this solo album [For Alto]. I thought he was crazy when he did it, boy, but it turned out so beautifully. It's a great idea. So as a result of that, I went into it."

Concerning the concert venue, Jenkins remarked: "That's typical of what I do a lot. I play a lot of contemporary museums, alternative performance spaces. I do quite a bit of that throughout America. Not too much in Europe, but throughout America. In just about every little town and big town..." Regarding his performance of "Giant Steps", Jenkins commented: "I kept the melody in my head... I played my version of that tune. My version was not about playing the chord changes. Don't get me wrong, I love the piece. I love to hear Coltrane playing it. It's personal to Coltrane's ideology at that time. But, my version isn't about that. I probably had more fun playing it than Coltrane did."

== Reception ==
Professional ratings
Review scores
Source	Rating
AllMusic	4.5/5 stars
The Penguin Guide to Jazz	4/4 stars

The authors of the Penguin Guide to Jazz Recordings awarded the album 4 stars, stating: "There is a grizzled majesty... a confident conflation of traditions. Tackling 'Giant Steps' and Dizzy's 'Wouldn't You' on solo fiddle and viola bespeaks some courage, but Jenkins skates across those familiar harmonics with breathtaking ease. The recording is up-close and very personal, and anyone who has not encountered his work previously will be captivated." Writing for AllMusic, "Blue" Gene Tyranny called it "an extraordinary CD of solo violin and viola improvisations."

== Track listing ==
All compositions by Leroy Jenkins except where indicated.

1. "Blues #1" - 6:42
2. "Um Cha Chi Chum" - 3:58
3. "Hipnosis" - 3:37
4. "Big Wood" - 7:48
5. "Folk Song" - 5:41
6. "Off The Top Of My Head" - 4:52
7. "Wouldn't You" (Dizzy Gillespie) - 3:27
8. "Dive For The Oyster, Dip For The Pearl" - 4:15
9. "Keep On Trucking Brother" - 2:50
10. "Festival Finale" - 5:31
11. "Giant Steps" (John Coltrane) - 4:07
- Recorded October 24, 1992 at the Contemporary Arts Center, Santa Fe, New Mexico

== Personnel ==
- Leroy Jenkins – violin, viola
