= What It Is! =

Studio album by Kahil El'Zabar
- Released: 2013
- Recorded: September 28–30, 2012
- Studio: Riverside, Chicago
- Genre: Jazz
- Length: 54:49
- Label: Delmark
- Producer: Kahil El'Zabar, Steve Wagner

Kahil El'Zabar chronology
Mama's House (2009)	What It Is! (2013)	Follow the Sun (2013)

What It Is! is an album by American jazz percussionist Kahil El'Zabar, recorded in 2012 and released on Delmark. It was the debut of a quartet comprising three young players from the school of Chicago's AACM: tenor saxophonist Kevin Nabors, pianist Justin Dillard and bassist Junius Paul. The album includes five originals and two jazz standards by John Coltrane: "Impressions" and "Central Park West".

== Reception ==
Professional ratings
Review scores
Source	Rating
DownBeat	3/5 stars

The DownBeat review by John Murph states, "Kahil El’Zabar moves toward the center this time around and releases one of his most accessible discs yet. The adventurous drummer and bandleader steers an impressive quartet, composed of some of the newer generations of the AACM, and emphasizes blues, swing and groove."

The All About Jazz review by Troy Collins says, "Whether navigating funky R&B, modal post-bop or expressionistic abstraction, El'Zabar's young sidemen invest their efforts with palpable conviction, imparting even textbook extrapolations with heartfelt urgency."

In his review for JazzTimes David Whiteis states "As Howard Mandel’s liner notes assure us, this music is 'neither avant-garde nor old guard.' It’s unselfconsciously both contemporary and roots-rich, and it resonates with the joy of invention."

== Track listing ==
All compositions by Kahil El'Zabar except as indicated

1. "The Nature Of" – 9:50
2. "Impressions" (John Coltrane) – 9:43
3. "What It Is!" – 4:00
4. "Song of Myself" – 11:38
5. "Central Park West" (John Coltrane) – 9:33
6. "Kari" – 10:05

== Personnel ==
- Kahil El'Zabar – drums, African earth drum, kalimba
- Kevin Nabors – tenor sax
- Justin Dillard – piano, Hammond B3 organ, Fender Rhodes
- Junius Paul – bass
