= Dance with the Ancestors =

Studio album by Ethnic Heritage Ensemble
- Released: 1993
- Genre: Jazz
- Length: 61:30
- Label: Chameleon
- Producer: Kahil El'Zabar

Kahil El'Zabar chronology
Hang Tuff (1991)	Dance with the Ancestors (1993)	Renaissance of the Resistance (1994)

Dance with the Ancestors is an album by Ethnic Heritage Ensemble, a jazz band formed by percussionist Kahil El'Zabar, who is joined by saxophonist Edward Wilkerson and trombonist Joseph Bowie. It was released in 1993 on the Chameleon label and distributed by Elektra Records.

== Reception ==
Professional ratings
Review scores
Source	Rating
The Penguin Guide to Jazz	4/4 stars

The Penguin Guide to Jazz states "Whether marching through 'Take the A Train' or one of their own, somewhat enigmatic, free pieces, the group suggests fresh avenues for Chicago jazz to turn down next."

== Track listing ==
All compositions by Kahil El'Zabar except as indicated

1. "Oceans Deep" – 7:51
2. "Ornette" – 8:19
3. "Hit Me" (Joseph Bowie) – 4:40
4. "Take the 'A' Train" – 3:18
5. "Alika Rising" – 7:30
6. "Ode to the True Crusaders" – 7:13
7. "Mis-Taken Brilliance" – 3:16
8. "Nia" – 6:36
9. "Gwenyana" – 7:17
10. "Dance with the Ancestors" – 5:30

== Personnel ==
- Kahil El'Zabar – earth drums, sanza, trap drums, percussion, vocals
- Edward Wilkerson – tenor sax, alto clarinet, percussion, vocals
- Joseph Bowie – trombone, congas, percussion, vocals
