= Ethnic Heritage Ensemble =

American jazz ensemble founded in 1973

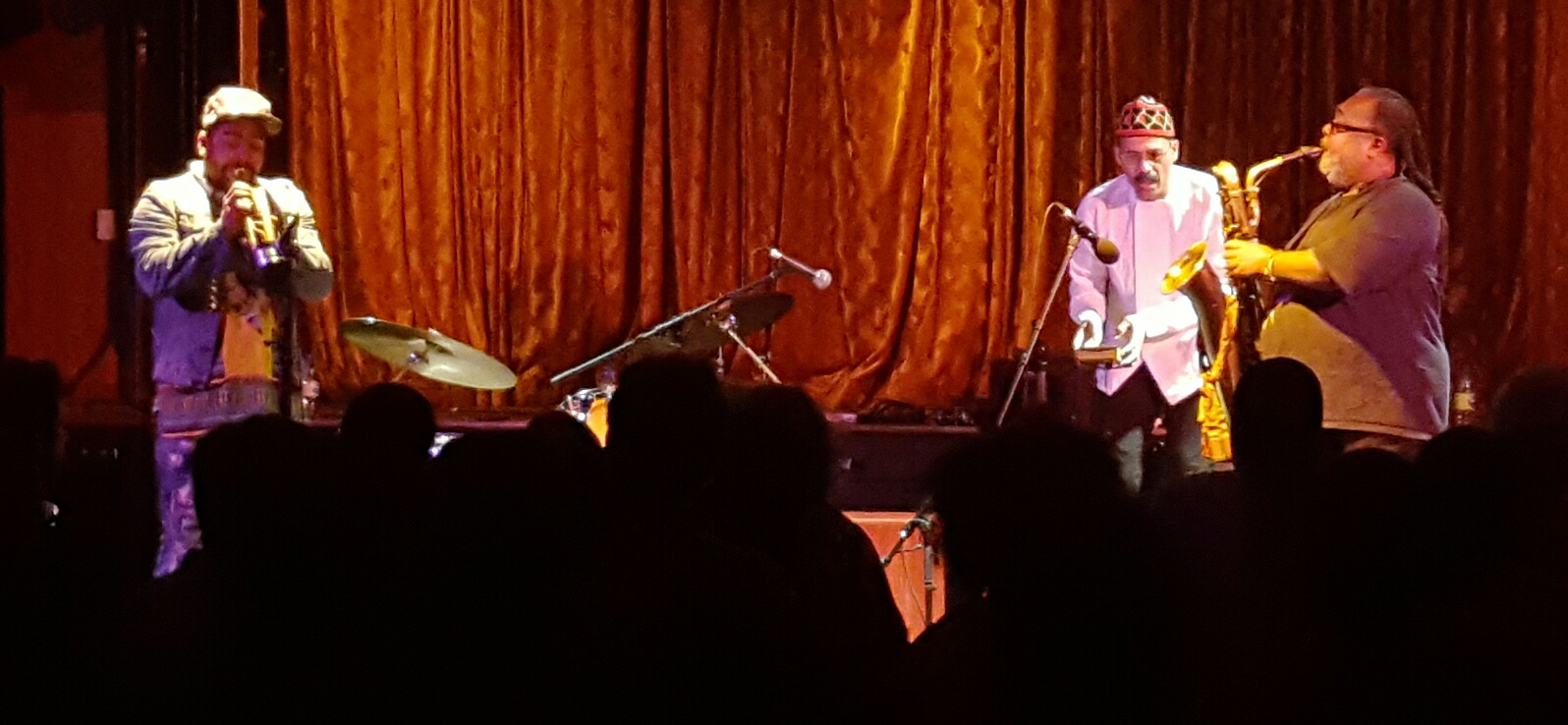
- Ethnic Heritage Ensemble photographed in Montréal, Quebec, Canada at La Sala Rossa.

Background information
- Genres: Jazz
- Years active: 1973–present
- Members: Kahil El'Zabar
- Past members: Kalaparusha Maurice McIntyre, Joseph Bowie, Ernest Dawkins, Light Henry Huff, Edward Wilkerson, 'Atu' Harold Murray, Hanah Jon Taylor

Ethnic Heritage Ensemble is an American jazz ensemble founded in 1973 by percussionist Kahil El'Zabar. Its members have included Kalaparusha Maurice McIntyre, Defunkt's Joseph Bowie, post-bop musician Ernest Dawkins, Light Henry Huff, 8 Bold Souls' Edward Wilkerson, Hanah Jon Taylor, and 'Atu' Harold Murray.

They have released over 15 albums, the latest in 2023.

== Discography ==
- Three Gentlemen from Chicago (Moers, 1981)
- Impressions (Red, 1982)
- Welcome (Leo, 1984)
- Ancestral Song — Live from Stockholm (Silkheart, 1988)
- Hang Tuff (Open Minds, 1991)
- Dance with the Ancestors (Chameleon, 1993)
- 21st Century Union March (Silkheart, 1997)
- The Continuum (Delmark, 1997)
- Papa's Bounce (CIMP, 1998)
- Freedom Jazz Dance (Delmark, 1999)
- Ka-Real (Silkheart, 2000)
- Hot 'N' Heavy — Live at the Ascension Loft (Delmark, 2007)
- Mama's House (Katalyst, 2009)
- Black is Back: 40th Anniversary Project (Katalyst, 2014)
- Be Known — Ancient/Future/Music (Spiritmuse, 2019)
- Spirit Gatherer: Tribute to Don Cherry (Spiritmuse, 2023)
