= Big Cliff =

Live album by Kahil El'Zabar
- Released: 1995
- Recorded: September 3, 1994
- Venue: Chicago
- Genre: Jazz
- Length: 64:22
- Label: Delmark
- Producer: Robert G. Koester

Kahil El'Zabar chronology
Renaissance of the Resistance (1994)	Big Cliff (1995)	21st Century Union March (1997)

Big Cliff is an album by American jazz percussionist Kahil El'Zabar and his Ritual Trio, which also includes saxophonist Ari Brown and bassist Malachi Favors, and the guest appearance of violinist Billy Bang. It was recorded live in 1994 at the Chicago Undergroung Fest and released on Delmark.

== Reception ==
Professional ratings
Review scores
Source	Rating
AllMusic	4/5 stars
The Penguin Guide to Jazz	3/4 stars

In his review for AllMusic, Alex Henderson states "The musicians' diverse set reflects their interest in both inside and outside playing.. Big Cliff is a CD that El'Zabar and his colleagues can easily be proud of."

The Penguin Guide to Jazz says "Though the music is dedicated to El'Zabar's late father, it is celebratory; scarcely a new take either on what he's done before or on Chicago jazz itself, it's nevertheless a very satisfying record.

== Track listing ==
All compositions by Kahil El'Zabar

1. "Another Kind of Groove" – 10:13
2. "Big Cliff" – 19:47
3. "For the Love of My Father" – 13:06
4. "Blue Rwanda" – 21:16

== Personnel ==
- Kahil El'Zabar – African drums, drums, thumb piano
- Ari Brown – tenor sax, piano
- Malachi Favors – bass
- Billy Bang – violin
