= 21st Century Union March =

Studio album by Ethnic Heritage Ensemble
- Released: 1997
- Recorded: June 17, 18 & 21, 1995
- Studio: Streeterville Studios, Chicago
- Genre: Jazz
- Length: 72:44
- Label: Silkheart
- Producer: Kahil El'Zabar

Kahil El'Zabar chronology
Big Cliff (1995)	21st Century Union March (1997)	The Continuum (1997)

21st Century Union March is an album by Ethnic Heritage Ensemble, a jazz band formed by percussionist Kahil El'Zabar, who is joined by saxophonist Edward Wilkerson and trombonist Joseph Bowie. It was recorded in 1995 and released on the Swedish Silkheart label.

== Reception ==
Professional ratings
Review scores
Source	Rating
AllMusic	4/5 stars
The Penguin Guide to Jazz	3.5/4 stars

In his review for AllMusic, Thom Jurek describes the album as:

an infectious, utterly intoxicating brew of African folk songs (complete with ritual instruments), rhythm marches, R&B honking, bop caesuras, and blues stomping that is inseparable from tradition yet extends its relevancy into a new era.

— Jurek, Thom. Ethnic Heritage Ensemble – 21st Century Union March: Review at AllMusic. Retrieved January 5, 2016.

The Penguin Guide to Jazz states:

The team has an almost chamberish feel on 21st Century Union March. Bowie takes a prominent soloist's role, Wilkerson seems reserved, and the music has a gentle way of unfolding, even when El'Zabar works up some thunder at his various drums.

— Cook, Richard; Brian Morton (2006). The Penguin Guide to Jazz on CD. The Penguin Guide to Jazz (8th ed.). London: Penguin. pp. 508. ISBN 0141023279.

In a review for JazzTimes Willard Jenkins says:

This is music not of an overly intellectual bent, it is instead so simultaneously earthy and ethereal as to conjure rich colorations and dreamscapes.

— Jenkins, Willard. "21st Century Union March review". JazzTimes.

== Track listing ==
All compositions by Kahil El'Zabar except as indicated

1. "Crumb Puck You Let Slide" – 6:48
2. "Fanfare" – 8:58
3. "Lover Man" (Jimmy Davis, Roger 'Ram' Ramirez, James Sherman) – 3:23
4. "How the Cow See Cirrus" – 11:43
5. "Missing Miles" (Joseph Bowie) – 5:03
6. "Burundi" – 10:05
7. "Love Outside of Dreams" – 6:27
8. "Dear Albert" – 9:01
9. "Procession" – 3:14

== Personnel ==
- Joseph Bowie – trombone, miscellaneous percussion
- Edward Wilkerson – tenor sax, alto clarinet, miscellaneous percussion
- Kahil El'Zabar – earth drums, sansa, trap drums, miscellaneous percussion, vocals

== Sources ==
- Jenkins, Willard. "21st Century Union March review". JazzTimes.
