= The Art of Improvisation =

Live album by Leroy Jenkins
- Released: 2005
- Recorded: October 8, 2004
- Venue: AACM concert, Community Church of New York, New York City
- Genre: Free improvisation, world music
- Length: 42:27
- Label: Mutable Music; 17523-21

Leroy Jenkins chronology
Equal Interest (1999)	The Art of Improvisation (2005)

The Art of Improvisation is a live album by violinist / composer Leroy Jenkins. It was recorded in October 2004 at an AACM concert in New York City, and was released by Mutable Music in 2005. On the album, Jenkins is joined by the members of his world music improvisation group, Driftwood: Min Xiao-Fen on pipa, Denman Maroney on piano, and Rich O'Donnell on percussion.

== Reception ==
Professional ratings
Review scores
Source	Rating
AllMusic	4.5/5 stars

In a review for AllMusic, Michael G. Nastos wrote: "this collaborative quartet dubbed Driftwood indeed emphasizes instruments made of wood in nomadic improvisational pretexts. The instrumentation alongside the witty, wise, and wanderlust violin style of Jenkins is as collectively unique in its pursuit of new sound timbres." The musicians "play off each other, rarely coalescing or coagulating. Instead they hear, react, and respond as if setting off remarkable bright bursts of brushfire light and heat, snuffing it out, and setting another smoldering patch. This separate and equal dynamic allows both the group democracy and familial qualities that Jenkins has always favored... This is a most successful project, one that should be enjoyed equally by those interested in creative improvised and world music."

Writing for All About Jazz, Rex Butters commented: "Leroy Jenkins' Driftwood rarely floats, but readily burns... The quartet roils with sound and ideas, frequently creating tones and timbres that seem anything but acoustic... Living up to its title, The Art of Improvisation features four bristling performances crafted in the moment by the highly attentive ensemble, merging and emerging through their shared creations."

Bill Shoemaker at Point of Departure stated: "New methods of structuring improvisations are devised daily; but rhythm remains one of the most reliable. It is open-ended, as it does not address pitch or timbre; at the same time, rhythm is a catalyst that assures at least an initial continuity. Violinist Leroy Jenkins uses this approach with brilliant results on the debut of Driftwood... Taking the prompts of each movement to heart... Jenkins and his collaborators almost instantly coalesce as ensemble, while giving each musician enough space on an ongoing basis to truly add to the unfolding music. The ensemble's complementary textures... also play a large role creating and sustaining the music's momentum. Yet, Driftwood's most admirable quality is their restraint. Each of its members are virtuosos... but they never disrupt the collectively articulated equilibrium."

In a review for JazzTimes, Chris Kelsey wrote: "No AACM'er has done the classical-jazz-world music fusion better than Leroy Jenkins. This album presents the violinist at his homespun/highbrow best... Maroney is unusually perceptive when it comes to timbre and admirably restrained when it comes to finding a place in the ensemble. Xiao-Fen is similarly egoless. She functions almost as a guitarist would, adding a percussive melodicism, playing postmodern Reinhardt to Jenkins' free-jazz Grappelli. O'Donnell's percussion interacts like a melodic instrument. He too has a keen sense of timbre and a powerful if slightly crooked manner of generating rhythmic intensity... Jenkins is typically excellent. Individually the four players are marvelous; collectively they are something special. This is a beautiful work."

Ken Waxman, writing for JazzWord, commented: the "players utilize decisive strategies plus consummate instrumental techniques to create improvisations that reflect all their backgrounds – and more – as well as modulations that don't fit traditional schema. Thus some timbres mix deliberate node-twisting internal piano string resonation with sprightly fiddle melodies. Others maximize the piano's percussive friction, the better to intersect with concussive, wood resonating tones from O'Donnell and spiccato from Jenkins. Min's four-strings and 30 frets allows her to produce harp-like glissandi to meet the violinist's repeated counter tones or tautly flat pick as if she was playing a Bluegrass dobro to counter the fiddler's double stopping."

== Track listing ==
All compositions by Leroy Jenkins except where indicated.

1. "To Live - Allegro Moderato ♩ = 116" - 10:41
2. "To Sing - Andante Cantabile ♩ = 80" - 18:00
3. "To Run - Vivace ♩ = 168" - 5:02
4. "To Believe - Pure Motion ♩ = 0" - 8:32
- Recorded October 8, 2004 at the Community Church of New York, New York City

== Personnel ==
- Leroy Jenkins – violin
- Min Xiao-Fen – pipa
- Denman Maroney – piano
- Rich O'Donnell – percussion
