= Papa's Bounce =

Studio album by Ethnic Heritage Ensemble
- Released: 1998
- Recorded: February 16 & 17, 1998
- Studio: Spirit Room, Rossie, New York
- Genre: Jazz
- Length: 70:24
- Label: CIMP
- Producer: Robert D. Rusch

Kahil El'Zabar chronology
Return of the Lost Tribe (1998)	Papa's Bounce (1998)	Conversations (1999)

Papa's Bounce is an album by Ethnic Heritage Ensemble, a jazz band formed by percussionist Kahil El'Zabar, who is joined by trombonist Joseph Bowie, saxophonist Ernest Dawkins and percussionist 'Atu' Harold Murray. It was recorded in 1998 and released on CIMP.

== Reception ==
Professional ratings
Review scores
Source	Rating
AllMusic	4/5 stars
The Penguin Guide to Jazz	3.5/4 stars

In his review for AllMusic, Steve Loewy notes: "Much of the album is surprisingly low volume, immersed in delightfully tranquil sounds. The group never forgets its mission, though, and even when playing in low gear, the creative sparks fly."

The Penguin Guide to Jazz states: "CIMP's dry, 'real' sound suits the EHE just fine, and its seldom made a record that sounds as lucid and spontaneous as Papa's Bounce."

The All About Jazz review by Derek Taylor says: "As a whole this disc radiates a love and respect for African traditions that will enrich the ears of any listener willing to explore it’s bountiful expanses."

== Track listing ==
All compositions by Kahil El'Zabar

1. "Papa's Bounce" – 14:32
2. "Dance'm" – 6:10
3. "Song of My Self" – 10:01
4. "Blue Rwanda" – 11:08
5. "Spirit Dancer" – 10:14
6. "Indestructible Consciousness" – 8:58
7. "Sunshine Serenade" – 9:21

== Personnel ==
- Kahil El'Zabar – drums, voice, thumb piano
- Ernest Dawkins – alto sax, tenor sax, percussion
- Joseph Bowie – trombone, percussion, voice
- 'Atu' Harold Murray – percussion, vaccine
