= Dwight Trible =

American jazz singer

Dwight Trible is an American jazz singer, living in Los Angeles. He has made albums in collaboration with Carlos Gabriel Niño, John Beasley, and Matthew Halsall, releasing them on Ninja Tune and Gondwana Records. He was an original member of Pure Essence.

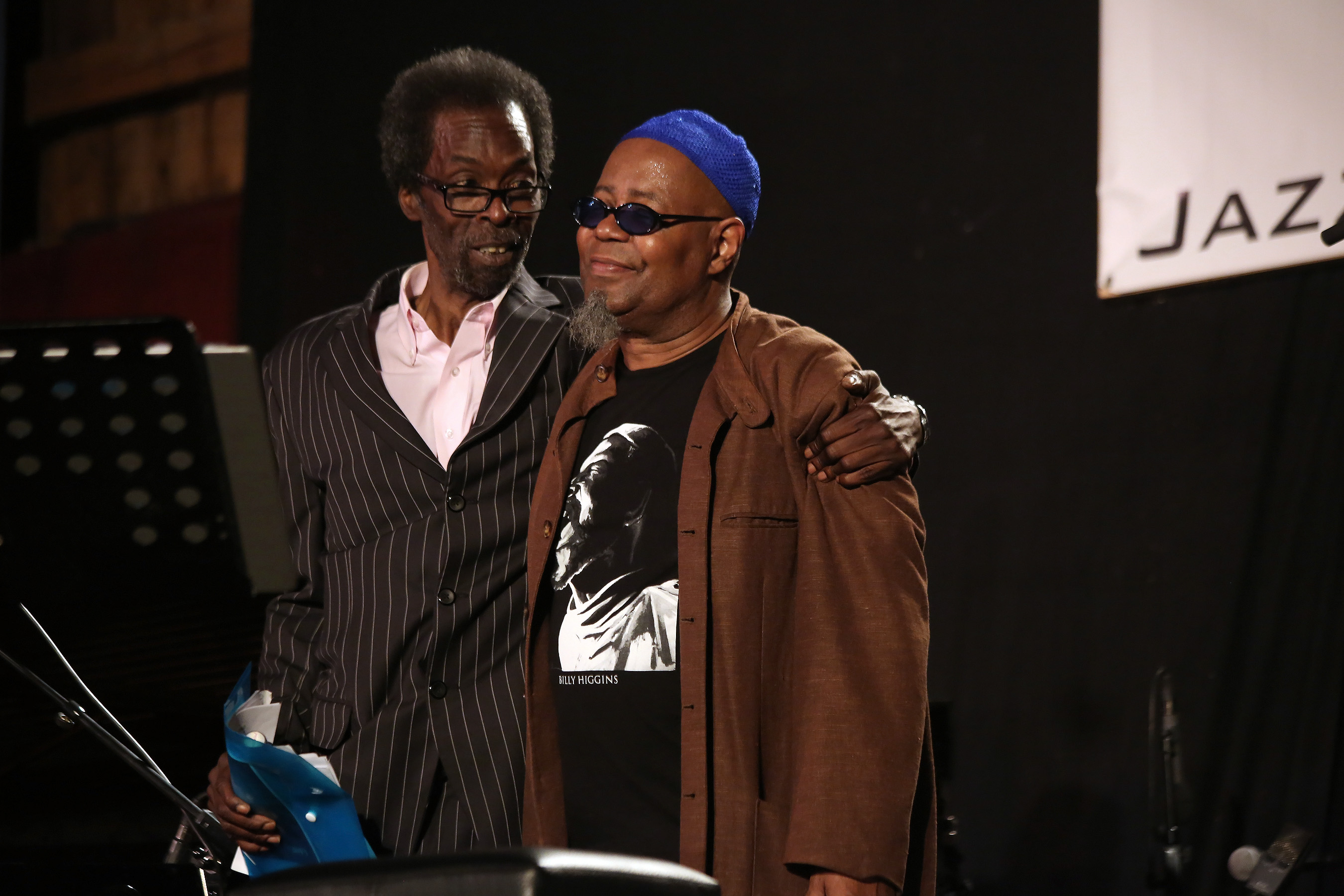
Trible (right) in 2013.

== Recognition ==
Mike Hobart, wrote in the Financial Times that "Trible has been forging his particular slant on spiritual-modal jazz for decades, delivering his love-is-the-answer message with clear diction, rich tones and a beautifully controlled vibrato. Trible's sonic range adds a dash of Isaac Hayes gravel to the imperious sonorities of Barry White, and, like them, he steeps his voice in the inflections of gospel-soul and the blues. But, having worked with the likes of Pharaoh Sanders and Charles Lloyd, he is equally in control of the nuances and demands of jazz."

Andrew Gilbert wrote in JazzTimes that "few musicians have done more to cultivate the L.A. [jazz] scene over the past four decades" than Trible.

== Discography ==
=== Albums ===
- Horace (Elephant, 2002) – a tribute to Horace Tapscott
- Living Water (Ninja Tune, 2004)
- Love is the Answer by Dwight Trible & The Life Force Trio (Ninja Tune, 2005) – with Carlos Gabriel Niño
- Cosmic (Katalyst, 2011)
- Duality (2011) – with John Beasley
- Inspirations (Gondwana, 2017) – with Matthew Halsall
- Mothership (Gearbox, 2019)
- Ancient Future (Gearbox, 2023)

=== Appearances ===
==== Albums ====
- The Epic (2013) by Kamasi Washington - Trible contributes lead voice
- Follow the Sun (2015) by Kahil El'Zabar
