= Groove Awakening =

Studio album by Ari Brown
- Released: 2013
- Recorded: May 13–15, 2013
- Studios: Riverside Studio, Chicago
- Genre: Jazz
- Length: 1:05:20
- Labels: Delmark; DE 5011

Ari Brown chronology
Live at the Green Mill (2007)	Groove Awakening (2013)

Groove Awakening is the fourth album by saxophonist and pianist Ari Brown. It was recorded during May 2013 at Riverside Studio in Chicago, and was released later that year by Delmark Records. On the album, Brown is joined by pianist Kirk Brown (Ari's brother), double bassist Josef Ben Israel, drummer Avreeayl Ra, and percussionist Dr. Cuz.

The album features three dedications to friends, colleagues, and relatives: "One for Ken" is for Chicago jazz pianist Ken Chaney; "3bop 4 Mal" pays tribute to trumpeter Malachi Thompson; and "Give Thanks (Song for Gerri)" is for Ari's mother-in-law.

== Reception ==
Professional ratings
Review scores
Source	Rating
All About Jazz	4/5 stars
All About Jazz	3.5/5 stars
PopMatters	7/10 stars

In a review for PopMatters, John Garratt wrote: "it's noticeable just how boppy the album isn't. Groove Awakening really is all about the grooves. If the term 'smooth jazz' wasn't already highjacked by those who program playlists for dentist offices, this would be a welcome antidote."

The Chicago Reader's Peter Margasak included the recording in his list of "ten favorite albums of jazz and improvised music led by Chicagoans" for 2013.

Writing for All About Jazz, Hrayr Attarian stated: "This compelling record demonstrates that Brown's singular approach is very much in the spirit of his older and regretfully departed fellow citizens, [Fred] Anderson and [Von] Freeman. With the help of his band members Brown is keeping alive the intrepid individuality and the creative rigor of Chicago jazz."

Phil Freeman of Burning Ambulance commented: "Brown's playing is thick and slightly fuzzy around the edges, and steeped in the blues, almost like if Pharoah Sanders was a bar-walker in 1962... This album lives up to its title, letting the band groove at length... Though Groove Awakening runs over an hour... it never turns into a slog; its pleasures are pure ones, with everyone involved playing straight from the heart."

In an article for JazzWord, Ken Waxman stated that the album demonstrates that "the mainstream saxophone and jazz combo traditions continue to flourish while mutating enough to welcome new ideas," and remarked: "the elastic groove that emanates throughout from Ben Israel, Ra and Cuz is just so unadulterated and effortless that it appears as if it could continue all night long, then pick up without a break the next morning... the high-gloss playing here confirms that in the right hands standards and originals are equally ripe for exploration and exhibition."

== Track listing ==
1. "One for Ken" (Ari Brown) – 5:20
2. "Groove Awakening" (Ari Brown) – 5:02
3. "Enka" (Ari Brown) – 11:05
4. "Veda's Dance" (Ari Brown) – 8:41
5. "Lonnie's Lament" (John Coltrane) – 8:26
6. "In a Sentimental Mood" (Duke Ellington) – 10:05
7. "3bop 4 Mal" (Kirk Brown) – 4:08
8. "Wayne's Trane" (Ari Brown) – 8:38
9. "Give Thanks (Song for Gerri)" (Ari Brown) – 3:56

== Personnel ==
- Ari Brown – tenor saxophone, soprano saxophone, piano
- Kirk Brown – piano
- Yosef Ben Israel – double bass
- Avreeayl Ra – drums
- Dr. Cuz – percussion
