= The Tip (album) =

Studio album by David Murray
- Released: January 2, 1995
- Recorded: May 26–30, 1994; Chicago Recording Company, Chicago, Illinois
- Genre: Jazz
- Length: 66:29
- Label: DIW; DIW 891
- Producer: Kanzunori Sugiyama

David Murray chronology
David Murray Quintet (1994)	The Tip (1995)	Jug-A-Lug (1994)

The Tip is an album by David Murray released on the Japanese DIW label. Recorded in 1994 and released in 1995, the album features performances by Murray with Robert Irving III, Bobby Broom, Darryl Jones, Toby Williams and Kahil El'Zabar.

== Reception ==
The Allmusic review awarded the album 3 stars stating "Murray plays with as much focus and imagination as ever, and The Tip shows his depth and diversity as a musician as well as his willingness to explore new formats. The Tip is an accessible, energetic, and thoroughly enjoyable Murray outing".

Professional ratings
Review scores
Source	Rating
Allmusic	3/5 stars

== Track listing ==
1. "Sex Machine" (Sly Stone) - 14:12
2. "Flowers for Albert" (David Murray) - 9:20
3. "Removen Veil" (Darryl Jones) - 3:15
4. "M.D." (Robert Irving III) - 7:53
5. "Kahari Romare" (Kahil El'Zabar) - 9:13
6. "The Tip" (Jones) - 6:28
7. "Mailinda" (Irving) - 10:08
8. "One World Family" (El'Zabar, Murray) - 6:00

== Personnel ==
- David Murray - tenor saxophone, bass clarinet
- Robert Irving III - synthesizer, organ
- Bobby Broom - guitar
- Daryl Thompson - guitar (tracks 1, 3 & 7)
- Darryl Jones - bass
- Toby Williams - drums
- Kahil El'Zabar - percussion, vocal
- Olu Dara - cornet (track 2)
- G'Ra - vocals (track 3)
