= A Sanctuary Within =

Studio album by David Murray
- Released: 1992
- Recorded: December 13 & 14, 1991
- Genre: Jazz
- Length: 70:42
- Label: Black Saint
- Producer: Giovanni Bonandrini

David Murray chronology
Real Deal (1992)	A Sanctuary Within (1992)	Death of a Sideman (1992)

A Sanctuary Within is an album by David Murray, released on the Italian Black Saint label in 1992. It features performances by Murray, Sunny Murray, Kahil El'Zabar and Tony Overwater.

== Reception ==
The Atlantic deemed the album "a quartet program of diverse moods enlivened by drummer Sunny Murray and percussionist Kahil El'Zabar."

The AllMusic review awarded the album 4½ stars.

Professional ratings
Review scores
Source	Rating
AllMusic	4.5/5 stars
Tom Hull	A−
The Penguin Guide to Jazz Recordings	3/4 stars

== Track listing ==
1. "Short and Sweet" – 6:37
2. "Mountain Song" (Overwater) – 6:21
3. "Return of the Lost Tribe" (El'Zabar) – 10:16
4. "Waltz to Heaven" – 5:33
5. "A Sanctuary Within, Pt. 1" [Duo] – 6:08
6. "A Sanctuary Within, Pt. 2" [Quartet] – 9:00
7. "Most of All" – 8:54
8. "Song for New South Africa" – 7:13
9. "Ballad for the Black Man" – 10:40

All compositions by David Murray except as indicated
- Recorded at Barigozzi Studio, Milano, December 13 & 14, 1991

== Personnel ==
- David Murray — tenor saxophone, bass clarinet
- Tony Overwater — bass
- Sunny Murray — drums
- Kahil El'Zabar — percussion, sanza, vocals
