= Follow the Sun (Kahil El'Zabar album) =

Studio album by Kahil El'Zabar
- Released: 2013
- Recorded: April 9 &10, 2013 (track April 9, 7, 2013)
- Studio: Riverside, Chicago (track 9 live at Colab Spaces, Chicago)
- Genre: Jazz
- Label: Delmark
- Producer: Kahil El'Zabar, Steve Wagner

Kahil El'Zabar chronology
| What It Is! (2013) | Follow the Sun (2013) | Black is Back (2014) |

Follow the Sun is an album by American jazz percussionist Kahil El'Zabar, recorded in 2013 and released on Delmark. He leads his Ritual Trio with saxophonist Ari Brown and bassist Junius Paul, augmented by special guests vocalist Dwight Trible and Duke Payne on second tenor sax and bagpipes.

== Reception ==
Professional ratings
Review scores
| Source | Rating |
|---|---|
| DownBeat | 3.5/5 stars |

The DownBeat review by John Ephland states, "Sixty years young, El'Zabar sounds as creatively restless as ever."

The All About Jazz review by Hrayr Attarian says, "Ever the innovator, through out a career of three decades and sixty recordings, El'Zabar has maintained the singularity of his vision and a stylistic unity without repeating himself or becoming predictable. This CD is yet another integral and representative slice of his unfettered ingenuity."

In his review for JazzTimes David Whiteis notes, "Trible’s vocals, featured on six of the nine tracks, bespeak an intensely seeking spirituality, laced with anguish and toughened by street grit (accentuated by his playful excursions into hipster vernacular)."

== Track listing ==
All compositions by Kahil El'Zabar except as indicated

1. "Follow the Sun" – 5:33
2. "Softly As in a Morning Sunrise" (Sigmund Romberg, Oscar Hammerstein II) – 13:00
3. "Great Black Music" – 9:14
4. "Footprints" (Wayne Shorter) – 6:13
5. "Grandma's Hands" (Bill Withers) – 4:55
6. "Inner Heart" – 5:35
7. "Body and Soul" ( Edward Heyman, Robert Sour, Johnny Green) – 6:05
8. "Our Journey" (El'Zabar, Brown) – 6:06
9. "Up Your Mind" – 11:42

== Personnel ==
- Kahil El'Zabar – drums, kalimba, earth drum, vocals
- Ari Brown – tenor sax, piano
- Junius Paul – bass
- Dwight Trible – vocals on 1,3,4,5,7 & 9
- Duke Payne – tenor sax, bagpipes
