= Ancestral Song =

Live album by Ethnic Heritage Ensemble
- Released: 1988
- Recorded: May 3, 1987
- Venue: Fasching Club, Stockholm
- Genre: Jazz
- Length: 48:50 (LP); 63:10 (CD)
- Label: Silkheart
- Producer: Keith Knox

Kahil El'Zabar chronology
Another Kind of Groove (1986)	Ancestral Song (1988)	Golden Sea (1989)

Ancestral Song is an album by Ethnic Heritage Ensemble, an American jazz band formed in the mid-1970s by percussionist Kahil El'Zabar. The album, featuring saxophonist Edward Wilkerson, who joined the group in 1978, and trombonist Joseph Bowie, the third player in the band since 1986, was recorded live at Fasching Club, Stockholm in 1987 and released on the Swedish Silkheart label.

== Reception ==
Professional ratings
Review scores
Source	Rating
The Penguin Guide to Jazz	3/4 stars

The Penguin Guide to Jazz states "Ancestral Song was a somewhat modest start, with Bowie's lines offering only cautious counterpoint to Wilkerson's intensities."

== Track listing ==
All compositions by Kahil El'Zabar

1. "Papa's Bounce" – 9:35
2. "Loose Pocket" – 15:15
3. "Ancestral Song" – 13:25
4. "Mamma's House" – 10:35
5. "Three and a Half" – 8:20
6. "Kahil's Blues" – 6:00

5 & 6 does not appear on original LP

== Personnel ==
- Kahil El'Zabar – sansa, drums, earth-drum, percussion, voice
- Edward Wilkerson – tenor sax, clarinet, percussion
- Joseph Bowie – trombone, marimba, percussion
