= The Continuum (album) =

Studio album by Ethnic Heritage Ensemble
- Released: 1997
- Recorded: March 1 & 2, 1997
- Studio: Riverside Studio, Chicago
- Genre: Jazz
- Length: 63:58
- Label: Delmark
- Producer: Robert G. Koester, Steve Wagner

Kahil El'Zabar chronology
21st Century Union March (1997)	The Continuum (1997)	Jitterbug Junction (1997)

The Continuum is an album by Ethnic Heritage Ensemble, a jazz band formed by percussionist Kahil El'Zabar, who is joined by trombonist Joseph Bowie and two new members: saxophonist Ernest Dawkins, who replaces Ed Wilkerson, and percussionist 'Atu' Harold Murray. It was recorded in 1997 and released on Delmark.

== Reception ==
Professional ratings
Review scores
Source	Rating
AllMusic	3/5 stars
Down Beat	4/5 stars

In his review for AllMusic, Michael G. Nastos states "All the intensity of the EHE is here, but it has a quieter sonority, allowing more subtle shades to rise to the surface."

The Down Beat review by Jon Andrews notes "Replacing Ed Wilkerson in the ensemble, Dawkins has a tough act to follow, but he succeeds, bringing a lighter, exuberant sound on tenor and alto saxophones."

In a double review for JazzTimes John Murph says "The result is an amazing tribal jazz record that could rival any drum & bass track, hands down. Despite the smoother fluidity, The Continuum also amounts to one of the EHE's funkiest and most accessible offerings of recent times."

== Track listing ==
All compositions by Kahil El'Zabar except as indicated

1. "The Continuum" – 11:39
2. "Well You Needn't" (Thelonious Monk) – 6:19
3. "Ancestral Song" – 10:02
4. "Ornette" – 11:47
5. "From Whence We Came" – 8:39
6. "Chatham Dirge" – 8:24
7. "All Blues" (Miles Davis) – 7:08

== Personnel ==
- Kahil El'Zabar – drums, percussion, African thumb piano, voice
- Joseph Bowie – trombone, percussion
- Ernest Dawkins – tenor sax, alto sax, percussion
- 'Atu' Harold Murray – percussion, voice on 1
