= Jug-A-Lug =

Studio album by David Murray
- Released: 1995
- Recorded: May 26–30, 1994; Chicago Recording Company, Chicago, Illinois
- Genre: Jazz
- Length: 61:34
- Label: DIW; DIW-894
- Producer: K. Sugiyama

David Murray chronology
The Tip (1994)	Jug-A-Lug (1995)	Flowers Around Cleveland (1995)

Jug-A-Lug is an album by David Murray, released on the Japanese DIW label. Recorded in 1994 and released in 1995, the album features performances by Murray with Olu Dara, Robert Irving III, Bobby Broom, Daryl Thompson, Darryl Jones, Toby Williams and Kahil El'Zabar.

== Reception ==
The AllMusic review awarded the album 3 stars, stating: "If you're seeking David Murray the firebrand tenor, this isn't the place. But if you want some easygoing, funky jazz that retains passion and creativity, Jug-A-Lug is a good bet."

Professional ratings
Review scores
Source	Rating
AllMusic	3/5 stars
Robert Christgau	A−

== Track listing ==
All compositions by David Murray except as indicated.

1. "Jug-A-Lug" - 6:58
2. "Ornette" (El'Zabar) - 9:00
3. "The Desegregation Of Our Children" - 10:04
4. "A.B. Lib" (Williams) - 5:49
5. "Acoustic Octofunk" - 16:40
6. "18-H" (Broom) - 6:40
7. "I Don't Want It" - 9:27
8. "Morning Song" - 6:56

== Personnel ==
- David Murray - tenor saxophone, bass clarinet
- Olu Dara - cornet
- Robert Irving III - synthesizer, organ
- Bobby Broom - guitar
- Daryl Thompson - guitar
- Darryl Jones - bass
- Toby Williams - drums
- Kahil El'Zabar - percussion
