= Kahil El'Zabar =

American drummer

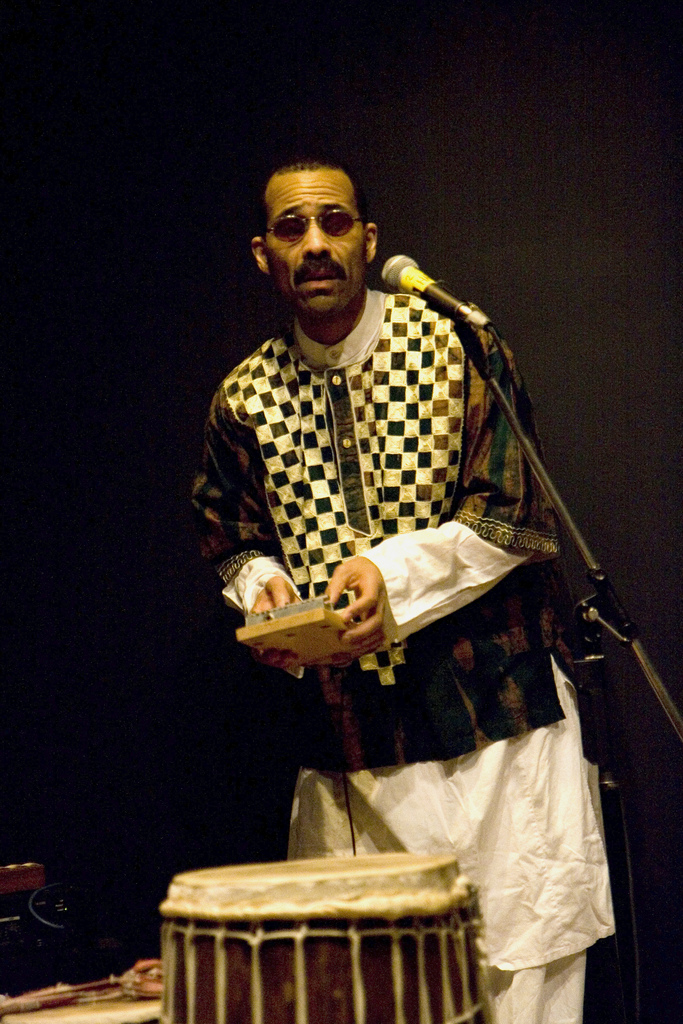

Background information
- Born: November 11, 1953 (age 72); Chicago, Illinois
- Genres: Bebop; Afro-Cuban jazz Free jazz
- Instruments: Percussion, drums

Kahil El'Zabar (born Clifton Blackburn; November 11, 1953) is an American jazz multi-instrumentalist (mainly a percussionist) and composer. He regularly records for Delmark Records.

== Life and work ==
El'Zabar was born Clifton Blackburn in Chicago, Illinois. His father was a police officer and amateur drummer, who bought his four-year-old son a drum set. At 16, El'Zabar began playing professionally with saxophnist Gene Ammons, who also lived in the Chatham neighborhood. He was also captain of his high school basketball team. He attended Lake Forest College and joined the Association for the Advancement of Creative Musicians (AACM) in the early 1970s, and became its chairman in 1975 at the age of 22, serving in that role until 1981. During the 1970s, he formed the musical groups Ritual Trio and the Ethnic Heritage Ensemble, both of which remain active. Musicians with whom Kahil EL'Zabar has collaborated include Cannonball Adderley, Billy Bang, Dizzy Gillespie, David Murray (who he first met on a Chicago basketball court), Pharoah Sanders, Paul Simon, Nina Simone, and Stevie Wonder.

In 2017 the film Be Known - The Mystery of Kahil El Zabar by filmmaker Dwayne Johnson-Cochran was released. The documentary follows El' Zabar and band on their 2007 Black History Month tour.

== Honors ==
In 2006, El'Zabar was named Chicagoan of the Year. In 2014, El'Zabar was knighted by France's Council General, receiving the Chevalier Medal of Letters for his contribution to arts internationally. He has sat on advisory boards of the National Endowment of the Arts, the Lila Wallace Reader's Digest Fund, and was appointed by President Bill Clinton to the National Taskforce on Arts Presenting in Education.

== Discography (partial) ==
=== As leader/co-leader ===
- Golden Sea (Sound Aspects, 1989) - with David Murray
- Return of the Lost Tribe (Delmark, 1998) as Bright Moments with Joseph Jarman, Kalaparusha Maurice McIntyre, Malachi Favors and Adegoke Steve Colson
- One World Family (CIMP, 2000) - with David Murray
- Spirits Entering (Delmark, 2001) - with Billy Bang
- Love Outside of Dreams (Delmark, 2002) - with David Murray, Fred Hopkins
- We Is (Delmark, 2004) - with David Murray
- Transmigration (Delmark, 2007)
- What It Is! (Delmark, 2013)
- Kahil El'Zabar's Spirit Groove (Spiritmuse, 2020) - with David Murray (whom he first met playing basketball in Chicago)
- Kahil El'Zabar's America the Beautiful (Spiritmuse, 2020)

El'Zabar has also designed West African clothing for Nina Simone and dresses fro actress Freda Payne.

With Ethnic Heritage Ensemble

- Three Gentlemen From Chicago (Moers Music, 1981)
- Impressions (Red Records, 1982)
- Welcome (Leo Records, 1984)
- Ancestral Song (Silkheart, 1988)
- Hang Tuff (Open Minds, 1991) with Joseph Bowie, Edward Wilkerson
- Dance with the Ancestors (Chameleon, 1993)
- 21st Century Union March (Silkheart, 1997) with Joseph Bowie, Edward Wilkerson
- The Continuum (Delmark, 1997)
- Papa's Bounce (CIMP, 1998) with Joseph Bowie, Ernest Dawkins, Atu Harold Murray
- Freedom Jazz Dance (Delmark, 1999) with Fareed Haque
- Ka-Real (Silkheart, 1997 [2000])
- Hot 'N' Heavy (Delmark, 2007)
- Mama's House (Katalyst, 2009)
- Black is Back (Katalyst, 2014)
- Be Known Ancient/Future/Music (Spiritmuse, 2019)

With Ritual Trio

- The Ritual (Sound Aspects, 1985)
- Sacred Love (Sound Aspects, 1985) - with Donald Rafael Garrett
- Another Kind of Groove (Sound Aspects, 1986) - with Billy Bang
- Alika Rising (Sound Aspects, 1990)
- Renaissance of the Resistance (Delmark, 1994)
- Big Cliff (Delmark, 1995) - with Billy Bang
- Jitterbug Junction (CIMP, 1997) with Ari Brown, Malachi Favors
- Conversations (Delmark, 1999) - with Archie Shepp, Ari Brown, Malachi Favors
- Africa N'Da Blues (Delmark, 2000) - with Archie Shepp, Ari Brown, Malachi Favors, Pharoah Sanders
- Live at the River East Art Center (Delmark, 2005) - with Billy Bang
- Big M: A Tribute to Malachi Favors (Delmark, 2006) - with Billy Bang
- Ooh Live (Bright Moments, 2008) - with Pharoah Sanders
- The Ancestors Are Amongst Us (Katalyst, 2010) - with Lester Bowie
- Follow the Sun (Delmark, 2013)

With Tri-Factor

- The Power (CIMP, 2000) - with Hamiet Bluiett, Billy Bang
- If You Believe (8th Harmonic Breakdown, 2002)

With Kahil El'Zabar Quartet

- A Time For Healing (Spiritmuse, 2022)

=== As sideman ===
With David Murray

- A Sanctuary Within (Black Saint, 1991)
- The Tip (DIW, 1994)
- Jug-A-Lug (DIW, 1994)

With Wadada Leo Smith

- Procession of the Great Ancestry (Nessa, 1989)
