= Out of the Mist (album) =

Studio album by Joseph Jarman and Leroy Jenkins
- Released: October 21, 1997
- Recorded: March 10 & 11, 1997
- Studio: Sear Sound, New York City
- Genre: Jazz
- Length: 52:48
- Label: Ocean; OR106
- Producer: Cynthia B. Herbst, Joseph Jarman, Leroy Jenkins

Joseph Jarman chronology
Pachinko Dream Track 10 (1996)	Out of the Mist (1997)	Return of the Lost Tribe (1998)

Leroy Jenkins chronology
Themes & Improvisations on the Blues (1994)	Out of the Mist (1997)	Solo (1998)

Out of the Mist is an album by saxophonist Joseph Jarman and violinist Leroy Jenkins, which was recorded in 1997 and released on the Ocean label. Jarman, Jenkins, and pianist Myra Melford would go on to form the collaborative trio Equal Interest.

== Reception ==
Professional ratings
Review scores
Source	Rating
AllMusic	4/5 stars

In his review for AllMusic, John Young states " Joseph Jarman's tenor saxophone and Leroy Jenkins' violin are better known from two important jazz outfits, respectively, the Art Ensemble of Chicago and the Revolutionary Ensemble. This time, Jarman's other axes include ceramic flutes, bass flute, "hands" (sic), some rather useless chimes and gongs, and the mysterious Isan. Jenkins swaps his violin for a harmonica on a few cuts, as well as playing kalimba, but that violin makes a great foil for the rather stiff timbre of Jarman's ceramic flutes. And a little stiffness proves to be a virtue this time ... There's a ceremonial feel to the playing; a stateliness that focuses the improvisations as surely as a handy stopwatch, cordiality co-exists with chaos".

A Billboard reviewer commented: "The avant-garde proves to be alive and well as genre giants meet... This progressive session creates memorable atmospheres of acoustic tones plucked, blown, and beaten in a kind of world-jazz blend influenced by not only African and East Asian styles but also by European modern classical music."

== Track listing ==
All compositions by Joseph Jarman and Leroy Jenkins

1. "Opening" – 4:50
2. "Hands" – 5:42
3. "Prayer at Sea" – 4:48
4. "Rain Forest" – 10:43
5. "Riding Currents" – 2:49
6. "At Play" – 4:48
7. "Blue Twilight" – 4:52
8. "Footprints" – 3:33
9. "Love in Dreamtime" – 5:57
10. "Chanting" – 4:46

== Personnel ==
- Joseph Jarman – ceramic flute, Peruvian clay flute, bass flute, Isan, bass clarinet, tenor saxophone, hands, chimes, gongs, voice
- Leroy Jenkins – harmonica, kalimba, cowbells, violin, viola, voice
- Jeffrey Schanzer – guitar, voice (tracks 2, 4, 6 & 10)
- Myra Melford – piano, prepared piano, voice (tracks 2–4, 6, 7, 9 & 10)
- Lindsey Horner – penny whistle, bass, voice (tracks 1, 2, 4, 6, 8 & 10)
