= Cape Town Shuffle =

Live album by Ernest Dawkins
- Released: 2003
- Recorded: August 6 & 7, 2002
- Venue: HotHouse, Chicago
- Genre: Jazz
- Length: 62:13
- Label: Delmark
- Producer: Robert G. Koester

Ernest Dawkins chronology
Jo'burg Jump (2000)	Cape Town Shuffle (2003)	Misconception of a Delusion Shades of a Charade (2003)

Cape Town Shuffle is an album by American jazz saxophonist Ernest Dawkins' New Horizons Ensemble, which was recorded live at Chicago's HotHouse in 2002 and released on Delmark.

== Music ==
"Toucouleur", named after a Senegalese tribe, was developed in 2000 when Dawkins started his partnership with the Montu Dance Theater of Chicago. "Third Line and the Cape Town Shuffle" features the Southern-Baptist-style preaching of New Horizons Ensemble member Ameen Muhammad. "Dolphy and the Monk Dance" is a tribute to saxophonist Vandy Harris. "Jazz to Hip Hop" is a scale-down sextet version from Dawkins' involvement in the Meet the Composers Residency and features the lyrics of Khari B. the Disco Poet, son of Mwata Bowden.

== Reception ==
Professional ratings
Review scores
Source	Rating
AllMusic	4/5 stars
The Penguin Guide to Jazz	4/4 stars

In his review for AllMusic, Alex Henderson states "Cape Town Shuffle isn't for bop snobs, but those who appreciate an inside/outside approach to avant-garde jazz will find these performances to be quite enriching."

The All About Jazz review by Mark Corroto says "That is butt-shakin' blues based jazz. Like Charles Mingus recalling the field hollers, the Art Ensemble of Chicago bringing the beat straight out of Africa, and Dizzy Gillespie spinning into new heights with bebop, Dawkins stirs his listeners to get up and move."

In his review for JazzTimes, Nate Chinen states "The music of New Horizons spills over with vibrant energies, conveying the life-affirming exuberance of cultural expression."

== Track listing ==
All compositions by Ernest Dawkins

1. "Toucouler" – 14:00
2. "Third Line and the Cape Town Shuffle" – 19:48
3. "Dolphy and the Monk Dance" – 14:07
4. "Jazz to Hip Hop" (Words: Khari B.) – 14:18

== Personnel ==
- Ernest Dawkins - alto sax, tenor sax
- Ameen Muhammad – trumpet
- Steve Berry – trombone
- Darius Savage – bass
- Avreeayl Ra – drums
- Khari B. – poetry on 4
