= Don DeMicheal =

American jazz musician and journalist (1928–1982)

Donald Anthony DeMicheal (May 12, 1928 – February 4, 1982) was an American jazz percussionist, bandleader, music journalist, music critic, and magazine editor.

== Life and career ==
DeMicheal was born on May 12, 1928, in Louisville, Kentucky. He began his career as a percussion teacher in his native city where he also led his own band and was a jazz drummer from 1951 to 1960. He relocated to Chicago where he was editor-in-chief of DownBeat magazine from 1961 to 1967. He concurrently worked as the editor of Jazz Record Review from 1961 through 1964. He also edited non-musical periodicals. For many years he was the editor of Plate World magazine and he was the author of the book A Manual for the Modern Drummer.

In 1969 DeMicheal was a founding member of Jazz Institute of Chicago (JIC); an organization of which he served as president from 1974 to 1978. As part of his work for the JIC he was responsible for planning the very first Chicago Jazz Festival which occurred in 1979.

DeMicheal also worked as a jazz vibraphonist in Chicago. In 1975 he established the ensemble Swingtet whose other members included clarinetists Chuck Hedges and Jerry Fuller. He was also a member of the Hot Three with Art Hodes and Kenny Davern. With this latter group he performed at the Newport Jazz Festival in 1981.

DeMicheal died at Skokie Valley Hospital in Skokie, Illinois on February 4, 1982. He was married to Anna Elizabeth DeMichael, with whom he had a son and daughter.
