= Chicago Now Vol. 1 =

Studio album by Ernest Dawkins
- Released: 1995
- Recorded: September 9 & 10, 1994
- Studio: Streeterville Studios, Chicago
- Genre: Jazz
- Length: 74:02
- Label: Silkheart
- Producer: Ernest Dawkins

Ernest Dawkins chronology
South Side Street Songs (1994)	Chicago Now Vol. 1 (1995)	Chicago Now Vol. 2 (1997)

Chicago Now Vol. 1 is an album by American jazz saxophonist Ernest Dawkins' New Horizons Ensemble, recorded in 1994 and released on the Swedish Silkheart label.

== Reception ==
Professional ratings
Review scores
Source	Rating
AllMusic	4/5 stars
The Penguin Guide to Jazz	3/4 stars

In his review for AllMusic, Scott Yanow wrote: "This CD is full of surprises and unpredictable music. Altoist Ernest Dawkins and his versatile sidemen perform a wide variety of originals."

The Penguin Guide to Jazz wrote that this second Silkheart album by the New Horizons "is also patchy, but the addition of Nicholson adds some fire and focus to the overall mix and Dawkins himself seems more contained."

== Track listing ==
All compositions by Ernest Dawkins escept as indicated

1. "Improvisations #1" – 6:24
2. "The Time Has Come" – 14:37
3. "Improvisations #2 (My Baby Blues)" – 3:37
4. "Bold Souls" – 7:44
5. "Dreams for Rahsaan" (Steve Berry) – 10:20
6. "Zera" – 10:53
7. "Flowers for the Soul" – 12:20
8. "Runnin' from the Rain" – 6:04

== Personnel ==
- Ernest Dawkins – alto sax, tenor sax, flute, percussion, vocal
- Steve Berry – trombone, percussion
- Ameen Muhammad - trumpet, percussion, vocal
- Jeff Parker – electric guitar
- Yosef Ben Israel – bass
- Reggie Nicholson - drums, percussion
