= Mother's Blue Velvet Shoes =

Live album by Ernest Dawkins
- Released: 1998
- Recorded: May 9, 1997
- Venue: Velvet Lounge, Chicago
- Genre: Jazz
- Length: 63:21
- Label: Dawk
- Producer: Ernest Dawkins

Ernest Dawkins chronology
| Chicago Now Vol. 2 (1997) | Mother's Blue Velvet Shoes (1998) | Jo'burg Jump (2000) |

Mother's Blue Velvet Shoes is an album by American jazz saxophonist Ernest Dawkins' New Horizons Ensemble, which was recorded live at Chicago's Velvet Lounge in 1997 and released on his own Dawk label.

== Reception ==
Professional ratings
Review scores
| Source | Rating |
|---|---|
| Down Beat | 3.5/5 stars |

The Down Beat review by Aaron Cohen states "What Dawkins shares with other notable Chicago improvisers is a dexterity on a number of reeds, as well as a skill in crafting compositions that are ideal for bands of like-minded navigators."

== Track listing ==
All compositions by Ernest Dawkins except as indicated

1. "10-16-if" – 9:49
2. "Many Favors Part I" (Steve Berry) – 16:57
3. "Many Favors Part II" (Steve Berry) – 7:32
4. "Mother's Blues Velvet Shoes" – 7:31
5. "Proof That the Evidence was Missing Intro" – 6:39
6. "Proof That the Evidence was Missing" – 18:46

== Personnel ==
- Ernest Dawkins – alto sax, tenor sax, percussion
- Steve Berry – trombone, percussion
- Ameen Muhammad - trumpet, percussion
- Jeff Parker – electric guitar
- Yosef Ben Israel – bass
- Vincent Davis - drums
- Kim Ransom - poetry
