= Velvet Songs =

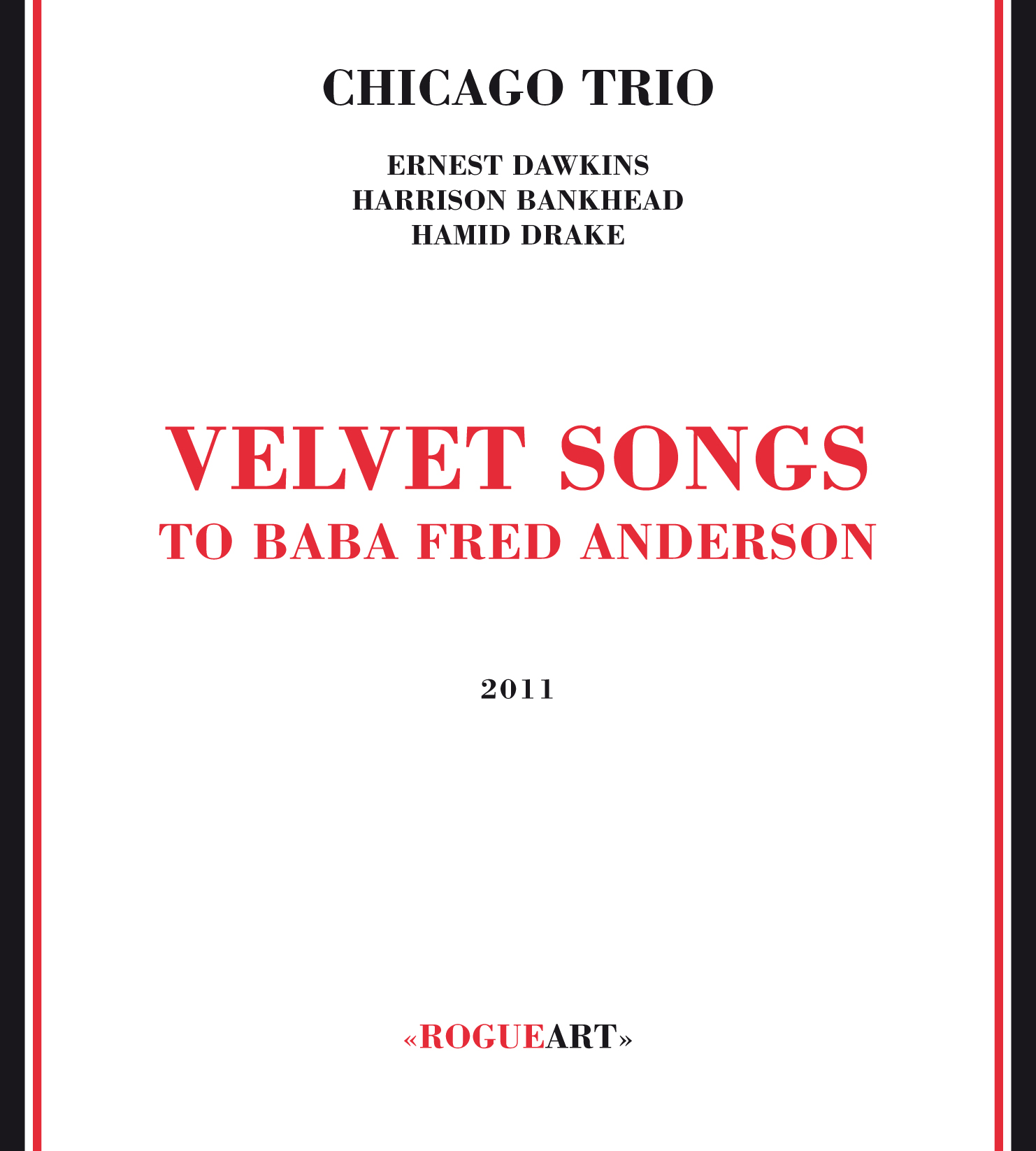

Live album by Chicago Trio
- Released: 2011
- Recorded: August 11 & 12, 2008
- Venue: Velvet Lounge, Chicago
- Genre: Jazz
- Length: 126:52
- Label: RogueArt
- Producer: Michel Dorbon

Ernest Dawkins chronology
The Prairie Prophet (2011)	Velvet Songs (2011)	Afro Straight (2012)

Velvet Songs, (subtitled To Baba Fred Anderson) is a double album by Chicago Trio, a collective jazz group consisting of saxophonist Ernest Dawkins, bassist Harrison Bankhead and drummer Hamid Drake. It was recorded live in 2008 at the Velvet Lounge, the club owned by saxophonist Fred Anderson, and released on the French RogueArt label.

== Reception ==
Professional ratings
Review scores
Source	Rating
Down Beat	3.5/5 stars
All About Jazz	4/5 stars

The Down Beat review by James Hale notes "Although recorded two years prior to Anderson’s death, the two discs are suffused with feeling for him, and there is a decidedly spiritual air about the performances."

The All About Jazz review by John Sharpe states "Dawkins, as he has shown many times with his New Horizons Ensemble, cuts a dash as a fluent soloist, drawing upon a varied palette of reeds to create his swinging lope, at times bop-ish in his dancing oscillation around changing tonal centers, while at other times impassioned and unfettered."

In her review for JazzTimes Lyn Horton says "The Chicago Trio never steps outlandishly into untenable zones but maintains a sense of portending reverence."

== Track listing ==
All compositions by Ernest Dawkins, Harrison Bankhead, Hamid Drake

Disc One

1. "Astral Projection" – 12:53
2. "Sweet 22nd Street (The Velvet Lounge)" – 12:10
3. "You Just Crossed My Mind" – 8:26
4. "The Rumble" – 6:11
5. "Peace and Blessings (to Fred)" – 9:21
6. "Down n' the Delta" – 7:40

Disc Two

1. "Jah Music" – 9:54
2. "Galaxies Beyond" – 5:47
3. "Woman of Darfur" – 10:00
4. "Waltz of Passion" – 8:56
5. "Moi Tre Gran Garcon" – 17:44
6. "One for Fred" – 17:19

== Personnel ==
- Ernest Dawkins – soprano sax, alto sax, tenor sax, percussion
- Harrison Bankhead – double bass, cello
- Hamid Drake – drums, frame drum
