= The Prairie Prophet =

Studio album by Ernest Dawkins
- Released: 2011
- Recorded: October 13 & 14, 2010
- Studio: Riverside Studio, Chicago
- Genre: Jazz
- Length: 64:39
- Label: Delmark
- Producer: Robert G. Koester

Ernest Dawkins chronology
Un-Till Emmett Till (2009)	The Prairie Prophet (2011)	Velvet Songs (2011)

The Prairie Prophet is an album by American jazz saxophonist Ernest Dawkins' New Horizons Ensemble, which was recorded in 2010 and released on Delmark. The album pays tribute to saxophonist Fred Anderson. "Mal-Lester" is an homage to Art Ensemble of Chicago members Malachi Favors and Lester Bowie.

== Reception ==
Professional ratings
Review scores
Source	Rating
AllMusic	4/5 stars
Down Beat	4/5 stars
All About Jazz	4.5/5 stars

In his review for AllMusic, Alex Henderson states "This 2010 recording is neither totally avant-garde nor totally straight-ahead, but rather, is an appealing union of the inside and the outside."

The Down Beat review by John Murph notes "Without attempting to make grandiose statements, The Prairie Prophet illustrates the excellence of Dawkins as a consummate jazz figure."

The All About Jazz review by Troy Collins states "Balancing inside and outside traditions with the same charismatic assurance as the album's dedicatee, The Prairie Prophet is a fitting tribute to a true hero of Chicago's avant-garde."

In his review for JazzTimes Shaun Brady says "The New Horizons Ensemble embraces a wide swath of jazz styles, where the bop- and gospel-tinged material can share a stage with the patchwork abstraction of 'Sketches', ceding way to the Middle Eastern evocations of trombonist Steve Berry’s 'Mesopotamia'."

== Track listing ==
All compositions by Ernest Dawkins except as indicated

1. "Hymn for a Hip King" – 8:09
2. "Sketches" – 12:07
3. "Balladesque" – 2:21
4. "Mal-Lester" – 10:40
5. "Shades of the Prairie Prophet" – 11:05
6. "Mesopotamia" (Steve Berry) – 6:50
7. "Baghdad Boogie" – 13:27

== Personnel ==
- Ernest Dawkins - alto sax, tenor sax, percussion, vocal
- Marquis Hill – flugelhorn, trumpet
- Shaun Johnson – trumpet
- Steve Berry – trombone
- Jeff Parker – guitar
- Junius Paul – bass
- Isaiah Spencer – drums, percussion
