= Memory in the Center =

Live album by Ernest Dawkins and the Live the Spirit Residency Big Band
- Released: 2014
- Recorded: 2014
- Venue: Chicago Jazz Festival, Millennium Park, Chicago
- Genre: Jazz
- Length: 1:13:14
- Label: Dawk Music

Ernest Dawkins chronology
Afro Straight (2012)	Memory in the Center (2014)

Memory in the Center, an Afro Opera: Homage to Nelson Mandela is a live album by saxophonist and composer Ernest Dawkins and the Live the Spirit Residency Big Band. It was recorded at the 2014 Chicago Jazz Festival, and was released later that year by Dawkins's Dawk Music label. The recording documents the premiere of a large-scale composition that pays tribute to Nelson Mandela, who died in December 2013. Dawkins composed and conducted the work, but did not appear as a performer.

== Reception ==
Professional ratings
Review scores
Source	Rating
All About Jazz	4/5 stars
All About Jazz	3.5/5 stars

In a review for All About Jazz, Hrayr Attarian stated that the album is "a vibrant and apt memorial to a truly inspirational man that is both timely and timeless. This intriguing and singular disc promotes social consciousness without sacrificing musical innovation and is sublimely complex while remaining accessible. It is testament of Dawkins' exquisitely creative acumen and courageous sense of morality."

David Whiteis of JazzTimes called the album a "fusion of postbop melodic and rhythmic thrust, jubilant swing, freedom-bound improvisation and militancy leavened by compassion and spiked with acerbic wit," and commented: "Once again, Ernest Dawkins has given us a work that exemplifies the inseparability of struggle and celebration, both in music and in life."

Point of Departure's Jason Bivins described the album as a "truly fine recording," and remarked: "The lines, the rhythmic shapes, the idiomatic blend, all partake of Dawkins' vision, realized here by a wide range of sympathetic musicians... It's also a bit of a love song commemorating the many connections between musical idioms across and through the many phases of the twentieth-century African diaspora... ultimately what comes through is Dawkins' own distinctive musical vocabulary."

In a review of the work's premiere, Howard Reich of the Chicago Tribune called the piece "musically gripping" and noted that it "held some of Dawkins' most ingenious writing" with orchestral passages that "startled the ear."

== Track listing ==
Composed by Ernest Dawkins.

1. "The Sacrament" – 4:20
2. "Movement 1: Mandela, Madiba, We Honor You!" – 6:43
3. "Movement 1: Homage to the Man" – 9:18
4. "Movement 1: Sap's" – 5:41
5. "Movement 1: Subterfuge" – 6:30
6. "Movement 2: Mandela's Blues" – 7:33
7. "Movement 2: Savior of the Nation" – 10:50
8. "Movement 2: Unjust into Right" – 4:20
9. "Movement 3: Song Bird" – 8:53
10. "Movement 3: Migration" – 9:06

== Personnel ==
- Ernest Dawkins – conductor
- Rajiv Halim – alto sax
- Brent Griffin – alto sax
- Irving Pierce – tenor sax
- Aaron Getsug – baritone sax
- Marquis Hill – trumpet
- Maurice Brown – trumpet
- Corey Wilkes – trumpet
- Phillips Perkins – trumpet
- Steve Berry – trombone
- Norman Palm – trombone
- Neil Gonzalves – piano
- Junius Paul – bass
- Isaiah Spencer – drums
- Khari B – spoken word
- Dee Alexander – vocals
