= Chicago Jazz Festival =

Music festival in Chicago, Illinois, US

The Chicago Jazz Festival is an admission-free, four-day annual jazz festival in Chicago's Millennium Park. It is run by the Department of Cultural Affairs and Special Events and programmed with the assistance of Jazz Institute of Chicago during Labor Day weekend, integrating international and local artists playing many forms of jazz music.

== Inaugural event ==
Shortly after Duke Ellington's death in 1974, a festival, led by singer and producer Geraldine de Haas, was organized to honor him in Grant Park. More than 10,000 jazz fans attended, and it became an annual event, attracting crowds of up to 30,000. In 1978, another group organized a Grant Park festival to honor John Coltrane. When, in 1979, the Jazz Institute of Chicago began preparations for its own Grant Park Festival, which would have resulted in three separate jazz festivals being held in Grant Park at the end of August, the Mayor's Office of Special Events stepped in and joined the three different festivals together into the Chicago Jazz Festival, which would present a week of free jazz performances. That first Chicago Jazz Festival included an Ellington Night, a Coltrane Night, and five other programs put together by the Jazz Institute of Chicago. Held at Grant Park's new Petrillo Music Shell, first season performers included: Von Freeman, Art Hodes, Benny Carter, McCoy Tyner, Billy Taylor, Mel Torme, and Benny Goodman; and the festival drew 125,000 festival-goers over its seven nights.

== Subsequent festivals ==
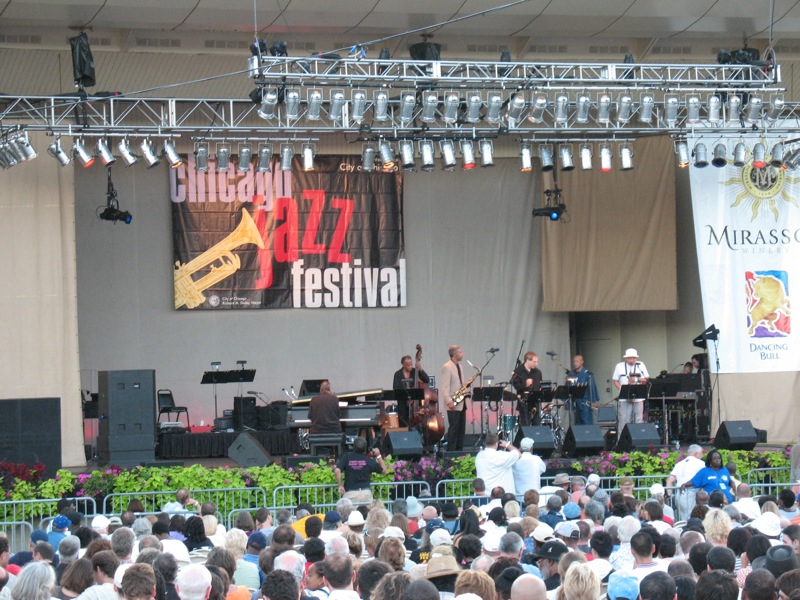
2007 Festival at Petrillo Music Shell

For many years, the entire evening Festival performances were broadcast live, coast-to-coast on 180 Public Radio Stations. Later on, highlight shows were assembled for later broadcast, until WBEZ abandoned its long-time jazz broadcasting.

Each year after the concerts are over, jam sessions, sometimes running late into the night and early morning, are hosted in various nightclubs by numerous prominent Chicago jazz musicians such as David Boykin, the late Fred Anderson, Dana Hall, Karl E. H. Seigfried, and Keefe Jackson.

The Jazz Institute of Chicago has continued to program the Chicago Jazz Festival every year, through at least 2024. The festival is now part of a summer-long series of concerts and festivals sponsored by the city's Department of Cultural Affairs and Special Events, including Taste of Chicago and the Chicago Blues Festival.

In 2011, the festival moved from Grant Park's badly aging Petrillo Music Shell and its side stages, where it had been held for more than 30 years, across Monroe Street to Millennium Park, where artists appeared at several performance pavilions as well as at the nearby Chicago Cultural Center, Ganz Hall at Roosevelt University, and several other locations. Though this provided better acoustics in the newer venue, some critics complained that the new arrangement unnecessarily scattered the performances, making it harder for attendees to hear some of the sessions because of the distance between the venues.

Due to the COVID-19 pandemic, the jazz festival went on hiatus in 2020, and was presented in a scaled back version in 2021, but returned with a full slate in 2022.

== Performers ==
Performers have included Miles Davis, Ella Fitzgerald, Anthony Braxton, Betty Carter, Lionel Hampton, Chico O'Farrill's big band, Jimmy Dawkins, Johnny Frigo, Slide Hampton, Roy Haynes, Sarah Vaughan, Carmen McRae, B. B. King, Count Basie, Sun Ra, Stan Getz, Jimmy Smith, Dexter Gordon, Dizzy Gillespie, Kenny Burrell, Ornette Coleman, and many others.

Featured Musicians by Year
Year	Headliners
2014	Homage to Nelson Mandela: Ernest Dawkins' Memory in the Center, an Afro Jazz Opera; Terence Blanchard with Ravi Coltrane & Lionel Loueke; Dave Holland, Kevin Eubanks, Craig Taborn and Eric Harland: PRISM
2015	Marquis Hill Blacktet; Henry Butler / Steven Bernstein & Hot 9; Billy Strayhorn Tribute w/ Chicago Jazz Orchestra playing Arrangements of Strayhorn Songs By Edward Wilkerson, John Hollenbeck, Steven Bernstein, Gordon Goodwin; Muhal Richard Abrams’ Experimental Band with Roscoe Mitchell, Henry Threadgill, Wadada Leo Smith, Amina Claudine Myers, Anthony Braxton, George E. Lewis, Leonard Jones, Wallace McMillan, Reggie Nicholson
2016	Orbert Davis; Charlie Haden’s politically-charged Liberation Music Orchestra; Benny Golson; Anat Cohen; John Scofield and Joe Lovano; Candido Camero
2017	Dizzy Gillespie’s Centennial Celebration with Jon Faddis and the Chicago Jazz Festival Big Band; Jason Moran presents In My Mind: Monk at Town Hall 1959; Ellabration! 100 Years of Ella Fitzgerald featuring the Brad William Trio, Sheila Jordan, Dee Alexander, Frieda Lee, Spider Saloff and Paul Mariano; Matt Wilson’s Honey and Salt
2018	Kurt Elling Sextet featuring Marquis Hill and Jeff "Tain" Watts; Dianne Reeves; Ramsey Lewis; Maceo Parker

== See also ==
- List of festivals in Chicago
- Music of Chicago
