= Jazz Institute of Chicago =

U.S. non-profit organization

The Jazz Institute of Chicago is a non-profit arts presenting organization that produces jazz concerts and runs educational programs. It was founded in 1969 by a small band of jazz fans, writers, club owners, and musicians to preserve the historical roots of Chicago music and to ensure that the music would still be heard.

Among the founding members were trad pianist Art Hodes, Muhal Richard Abrams, who a few years earlier had also co-founded the Association for the Advancement of Creative Musicians (AACM), Harriet Choice, then music writer for the Chicago Tribune, Joe Segal, owner of The Jazz Showcase, Bob Koester, owner of Delmark Records, Don DeMicheal, drummer and editor of Down Beat magazine, Jim DeJong, who went on to serve briefly as the institute's executive director and to serve almost fifty years on its board, and jazz promoter and supporter Penny Tyler.

In 1979, the institute began programming the Chicago Jazz Festival for the City of Chicago's Department of Special Affairs and Cultural events. This was commemorated through multiple events as a 50th anniversary celebration in 2019. Also in 2019, Heather Ireland Robinson, the executive director of the institute was named a 2019 Chicagoan of the Year.
