= Mean Ameen =

Studio album by Ernest Dawkins
- Released: 2004
- Recorded: March 21 & 22, 2004
- Studio: Riverside Studio, Chicago
- Genre: Jazz
- Length: 66:31
- Label: Delmark
- Producer: Robert G. Koester

Ernest Dawkins chronology
Misconception of a Delusion Shades of a Charade (2003)	Mean Ameen (2004)	The Messenger (2006)

Mean Ameen is an album by American jazz saxophonist Ernest Dawkins' New Horizons Ensemble, which was recorded in 2004 and released on Delmark. It was a tribute to New Horizons' trumpeter Ameen Muhammad, who died in 2003 at the age of 48.

== Reception ==
Professional ratings
Review scores
Source	Rating
AllMusic	4/5 stars
The Penguin Guide to Jazz	3/4 stars

In his review for AllMusic, Scott Yanow states "These musicians are clearly talented in several styles, play with open minds, and react quickly to each other's ideas."

The Penguin Guide to Jazz says "All in all, a fine album, well crafted and full of excellent solo playing. If it's not quite up to previous offerings, the cover portrait of the missing Muhammad goes some way to explaining why."

The All About Jazz review by Rex Butters says "Delmark's sound—clean, live, and rough—delivers the broad tonal options employed by the ensemble. With Mean Ameen, Dawkins and company have created a 21st century hard-bop maelstrom."

In his review for JazzTimes Chris Kelsey notes "The performances are fairly straight-ahead but enormously creative within slightly loosened conventions of small group jazz."

== Track listing ==
All compositions by Ernest Dawkins except as indicated

1. "Mean Ameen" – 10:46
2. "3-D" (Steve Berry) – 15:12
3. "Jeff to the Left" (Steve Berry) – 6:16
4. "The Messenger" – 13:33
5. "Haiti" – 4:24
6. "Buster and the Search for the Human Genome" – 16:20

== Personnel ==
- Ernest Dawkins - alto sax, tenor sax
- Maurice Brown – trumpet
- Steve Berry – trombone
- Darius Savage – bass
- Isaiah Spencer – drums
