= The Messenger (Ernest Dawkins album) =

Live album by Ernest Dawkins
- Released: 2006
- Recorded: July 14, 2005
- Venue: Velvet Lounge, Chicago
- Genre: Jazz
- Length: 63:53
- Label: Delmark
- Producer: Robert G. Koester

Ernest Dawkins chronology
Mean Ameen (2004)	The Messenger (2006)	Un-Till Emmett Till (2009)

The Messenger is an album by American jazz saxophonist Ernest Dawkins' New Horizons Ensemble, which was recorded live at the Chicago's Velvet Lounge in 2005 and released on Delmark. The event was also filmed and issued on DVD.

== Reception ==
Professional ratings
Review scores
Source	Rating
AllMusic	3.5/5 stars
The Penguin Guide to Jazz Recordings	3/4 stars

In his review for AllMusic, Michael G. Nastos states "Blues, hard swing, and sounds from the black church and Africa all merge into a unified whole that is infectious, head-nodding, and smile-inducing."

The All About Jazz review by Nic Jones says "If these players are indeed looking towards new horizons, as the band's name suggests, then they're doing so from a vantage point rooted in the past, and their view of the past is of a worthwhile order."

In his review for JazzTimes Mike Shanley notes "Part oratory, part gutbucket excursion, 'Goin’ Downtown Blues' serves as the centerpiece of an enthralling live set."

== Track listing ==
All compositions by Ernest Dawkins except as indicated

1. "Intro" – 0:48
2. "Mean Ameen" – 10:49
3. "The Messenger" – 13:09
4. "Goin' Downtown Blues" – 11:03
5. "Toucouleur" – 11:21
6. "The Brood" – 8:18
7. "Lookin' for Ninny" (Ameen Muhammad) – 8:25

== Personnel ==
- Ernest Dawkins - alto sax, tenor sax
- Maurice Brown – trumpet
- Steve Berry – trombone
- Darius Savage – bass
- Isaiah Spencer – drums
