= Afro Straight =

Studio album by Ernest Dawkins
- Released: 2012
- Recorded: October 28 and 29, 2010; April 2 and 3, 2012
- Studio: Riverside Studio, Chicago
- Genre: Jazz
- Length: 1:07:38
- Label: Delmark; DE 5001

Ernest Dawkins chronology
| Velvet Songs (2011) | Afro Straight (2012) | Memory in the Center (2014) |

Afro Straight is an album by saxophonist Ernest Dawkins. It was recorded during October 2010 and April 2012, and was released in 2012 by Delmark Records. On the album, which features eight jazz standards and two original compositions, Dawkins is joined by trumpeter Corey Wilkes, pianist Willerm Delisfort, organist Ben Paterson, bassist Junius Paul, drummer Isaiah Spencer, and percussionists Ruben Alvarez, Greg Carmouche, and Greg Penn.

== Reception ==
Professional ratings
Review scores
| Source | Rating |
|---|---|
| All About Jazz | 4/5 stars |
| PopMatters | 7/10 stars |

In a review for All About Jazz, Mark Corroto wrote: "Afro Straight is Saturday music. That day following a work week where you take off your suit and tie or uniform, and put on that favorite sweatshirt and pair of jeans to kick back and relax in the familiar confines of your home. The familiar is your solace, and saxophonist Ernest Dawkins delivering time-honored standards is the equivalent of comfort food for the ears."

John Garratt of PopMatters stated: "Afro Straight is so much more than a standard album of standards. Yes, he has the same racehorses running around his track... But he has fresh jockeys this time, and it makes for quite a good album."

Writing for Point of Departure, Troy Collins commented: "Dawkins' searing tone and quicksilver phrasing imbues the session with bold lyricism, whether the material is ballads, blues or bop classics... While it's not as conceptually daring as his albums with the New Horizons Ensemble or Ethnic Heritage Ensemble, the aptly-titled Afro Straight is nonetheless one of Dawkins' most enjoyable recordings."

In an article for JazzTimes, David Whiteis praised "Dawkins' gift for imbuing even his most outward-bound flights with a gritty swagger that invokes his city's hard-swinging heritage," and remarked: "Only occasionally... does Dawkins really stoke the engines and set his sights on more distant realms. Yet he and his compatriots... discover plenty of sparkling new beauty within the relatively conventional frameworks they've established here."

== Track listing ==
1. "Mr. P.C." (John Coltrane) – 6:47
2. "United" (Wayne Shorter) – 7:57
3. "Afro Straight" (Ernest Dawkins) – 1:33
4. "Central Park West" (John Coltrane) – 7:53
5. "Woody 'n' You" (Dizzy Gillespie) – 4:30
6. "Softly, as in a Morning Sunrise" (Sigmund Romberg, Oscar Hammerstein II) – 8:13
7. "God Bless the Child" (Billie Holiday, Arthur Herzog Jr.) – 4:54
8. "Footprints" (Wayne Shorter) – 8:23
9. "Old Man Blues" (Ernest Dawkins) – 7:12
10. "Juju" (Wayne Shorter) – 9:52

== Personnel ==
- Ernest Dawkins – alto saxophone, tenor saxophone, percussion
- Corey Wilkes – trumpet
- Willerm Delisfort – piano
- Ben Paterson – organ
- Junius Paul – bass
- Isaiah Spencer – drums
- Ruben Alvarez – congas, bongos, chimes, shaker (tracks 3, 4, 8)
- Greg Carmouche – congas (tracks 1, 6)
- Greg Penn – congas (tracks 3, 10)
