= Petrillo Music Shell =

Outdoor theatre in Chicago, Illinois

Coordinates: 41.8788°N 87.6200°W

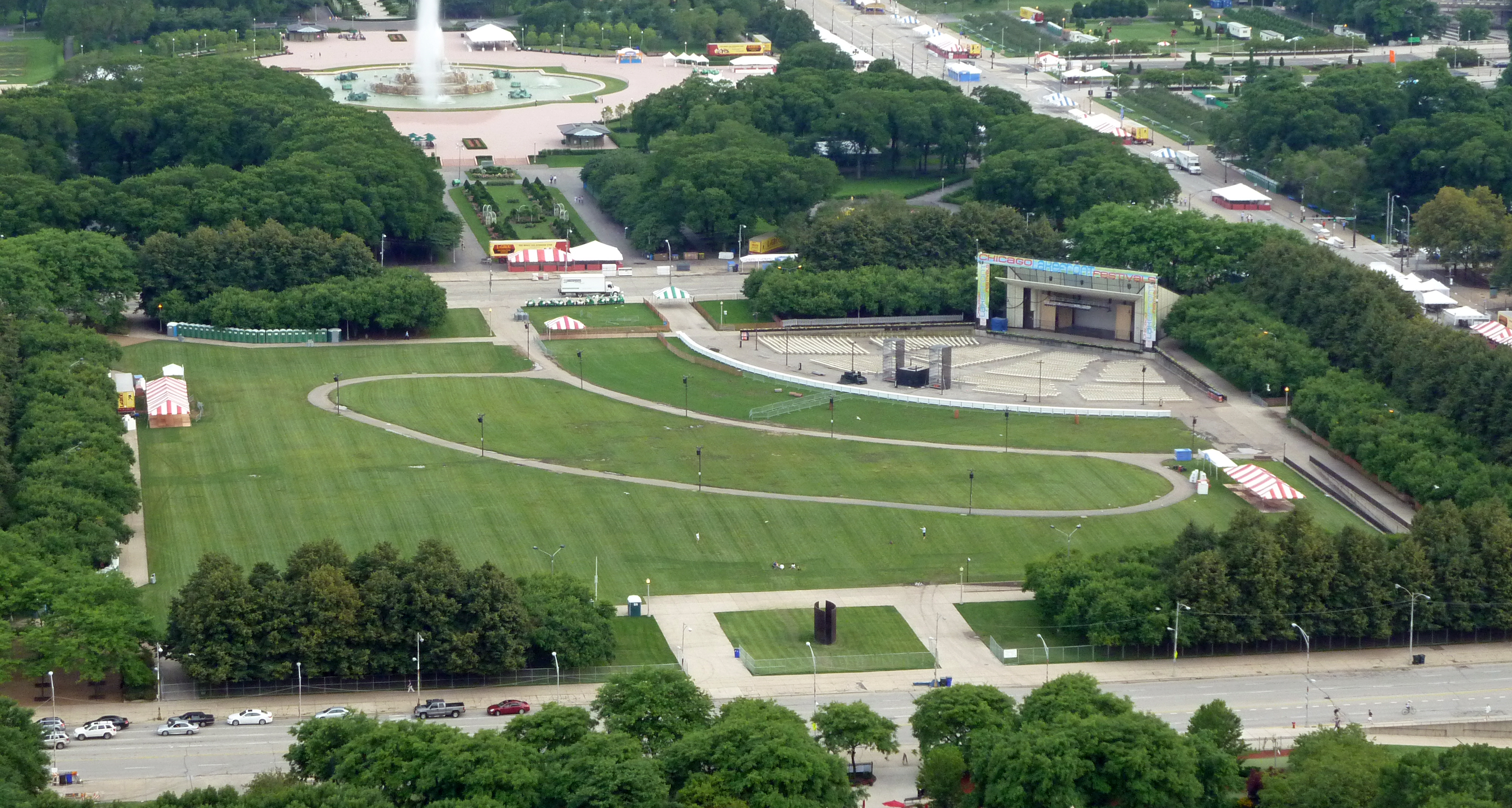
- Aerial view of venue (c.2010)
- Interactive map of Petrillo Music Shell
- Full name: James C. Petrillo Music Shell
- Former names: Grant Park Band Shell (1931-78)
- Address: 235 S Columbus Dr; Chicago, IL 60604
- Location: Grant Park
- Owner: City of Chicago
- Capacity: ~35,000: (Reserved seating: 5,022; General admission^{A}: 30,000)

Construction
- Groundbreaking: July 11, 1931
- Opened: August 24, 1931
- Renovated: 1978
- Cost: $15,000 ($317,560 in 2025 dollars)
- Architect: E.V. Buchsbaum
- Building details

General information
- Relocated: July 24, 1978
- Renovation cost: $2.6 million ($12.8 million in 2025 dollars)

Renovating team
- Architect: C.F. Murphy Associates
- Other designers: Klepper, Marshall & Kings Associates

The Petrillo Music Shell (sometimes referred to as the Petrillo Bandshell or formally as the James C. Petrillo Music Shell) is an outdoor amphitheater in Grant Park in the Loop community area of Chicago in Cook County, Illinois, United States. It serves as host to many large annual music festivals in the city such as Chicago Blues Festival, Chicago Jazz Festival, Taste of Chicago and Lollapalooza.

It is also the former host of several smaller annual events that have moved to the newer Jay Pritzker Pavilion such as the Grant Park Music Festival, Chicago Gospel Music Festival, and Chicago Latin Music Festival.

The name has been applied to two different structures: one that stood facing Hutchinson Field, near the south end of Grant Park, from 1931 to 1975; and a replacement structure facing Butler Field at Monroe and Columbus that opened in 1978.

The original bandshell was commissioned in 1931 by Mayor Anton Cermak during the Great Depression to help lift the spirits of the citizenry with free concerts. In 1975, the music shell was named to honor James C. Petrillo, president of the Chicago Federation of Musicians from 1922 to 1962 and president of the American Federation of Musicians from 1940 to 1958, who created a free concert series in Grant Park in 1935. Petrillo was a commissioner of the Chicago Park District from 1934 to 1945.

== Location and layout ==
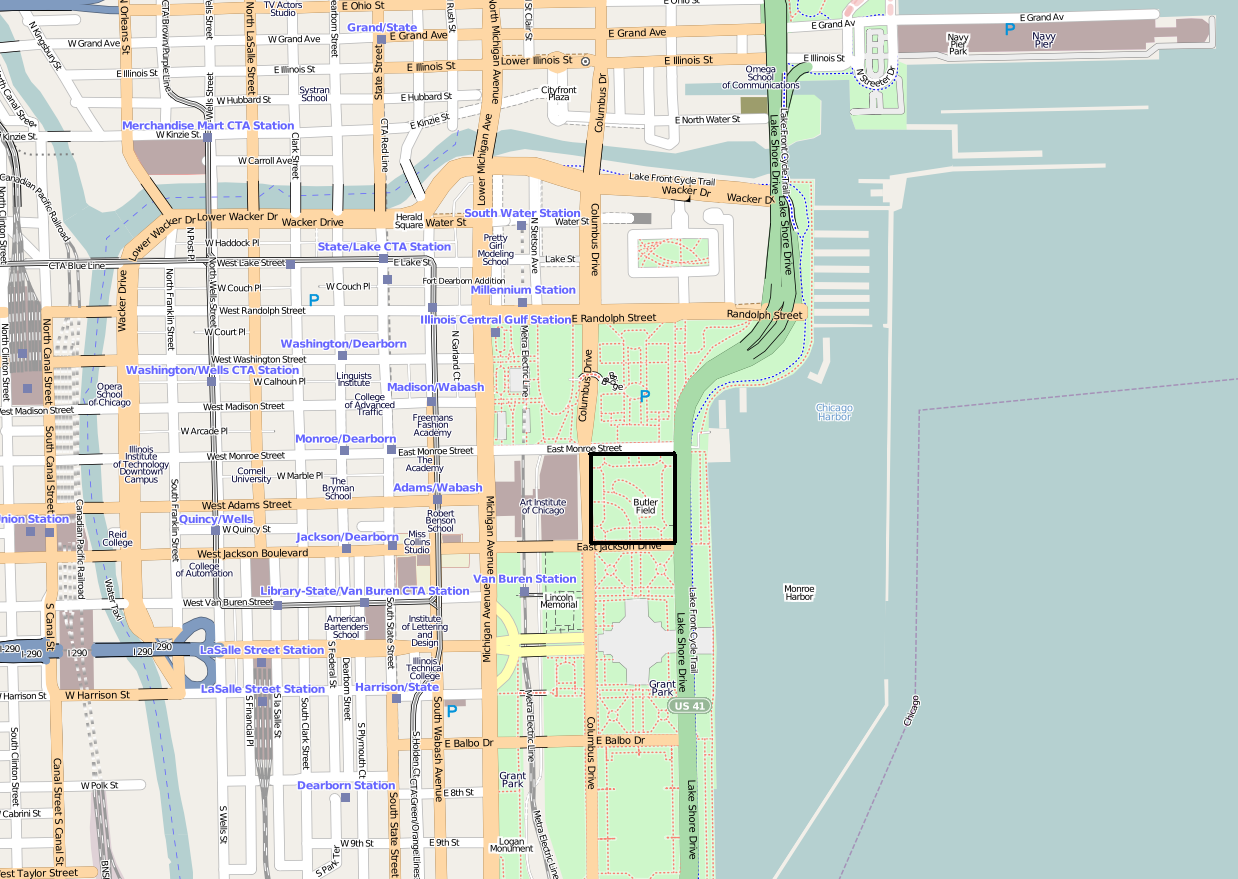
Butler Field, current location of Petrillo Music Shell

In 1915, the commissioners of South Park (Grant Park's predecessor) located a temporary wooden bandshell in the Park near Michigan and Congress Avenues. It hosted large events as well as band performances and remained in place for five or six years. In 1931, Cermak suggested free concerts to lift spirits of Chicagoans during the Great Depression. The Depression and the proliferation of new technological innovations such as records, radios and sound films led to a declining demand for live music and a shrinking job market for musicians. That year, as buildings were being built for the 1933 Century of Progress International Exposition, the Chicago Concert Band Association offered to organize a seventy-person concert band to give free summer concerts if the park commissioners would build a band shell that had electric lighting and dressing rooms. Construction on the wood and fiber E. V. Buchsbaum design began on a budget of $12,500 ($264,633 in today's dollars), and the opening of free concerts commenced on August 24, 1931. Construction was completed in three weeks.

On July 1, 1935, Petrillo oversaw the beginning of free concerts in Grant Park at the original bandshell located on the south end of the park across Lake Shore Drive from the Field Museum of Natural History. Originally referred to as the Grant Park Band Shell, the bandshell was renamed and dedicated in honor of Petrillo in 1975.

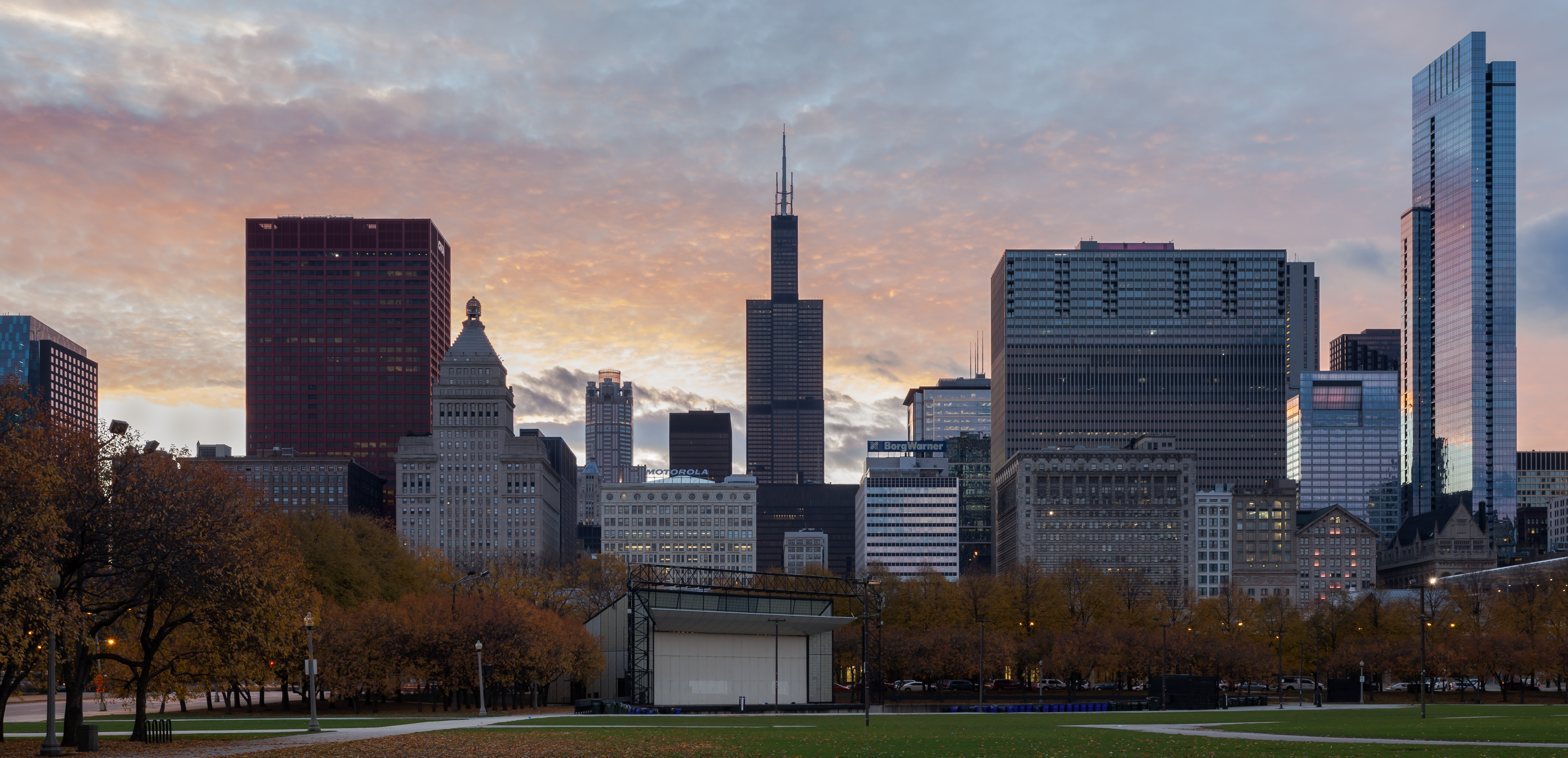
Petrillo Music Shell in front of the Chicago Skyline (Including CNA Center, Willis Tower and Legacy Tower)

There were numerous plans and proposals to replace the original band shell beginning almost as soon as the Festival began. Among the most prominent was a post-WWII (1946) plan to have a fifteen-thousand-seat butterfly-design retractible canopy band shell on the block immediately east of the Art Institute of Chicago that eventually came to host the second incarnation of the Petrillo Music Shell. In 1953 a referendum was almost held on the November 3 Election Day ballot for a $3 million ($36.1) structure, but at the last minute a bond issue was denied. In 1963, a plan for a ten thousand seat music bowl was propounded. By the 1970s the original bandshell had deteriorated to the point where "stagehands, performers and even a grand piano had fallen through the stage floor." Amid the catastrophes, the musicians joked about the need for hard hats. Despite $77,000 ($409,102) in 1977 repair expenditures by the city, the performers were considering cancelling the 1978 season.

Deed restrictions dating from the city's early history generally forbid any buildings in Grant Park between Randolph Drive and 11th Place. As the result of a series of Illinois Supreme Court rulings, Grant Park has been "forever open, clear and free" since 1836, which was a year before the city of Chicago was incorporated. In 1839, United States Secretary of War Joel Roberts Poinsett declared the land between Randolph Street and Madison Street east of Michigan Avenue "Public Ground forever to remain vacant of buildings. Aaron Montgomery Ward, who is known both as the inventor of mail order and the protector of Grant Park, twice sued the city of Chicago to force it to remove buildings and structures from Grant Park and to keep it from building new ones. As a result, the city has what are termed the Montgomery Ward height restrictions on buildings and structures in Grant Park.

In 1972, plans were advanced to build a large new concrete-and-fiberglass band shell atop a new underground parking garage, but community groups defended the Ward restrictions. A compromise produced the inexpensive, staff-designed, demountable band shell at Butler Field, which opened in 1978. The "semi-permanent" designation skirted the Ward prohibitions and the new structure cost only $3 million ($14.8 million).

With an official street address at 235 S. Columbus Drive, the music shell anchors the southwest corner of Butler Field, an entire block bounded by Lake Shore Drive to the east, Columbus Drive to the west, East Monroe Drive to the north and East Jackson Drive to the south. This places it a block east of the Art Institute of Chicago, a block north of Buckingham Fountain, and southeast of Millennium Park. The amphitheater and paved surface for public seating has served as one of the main stages for recent Lollapalooza celebrations.

== History ==
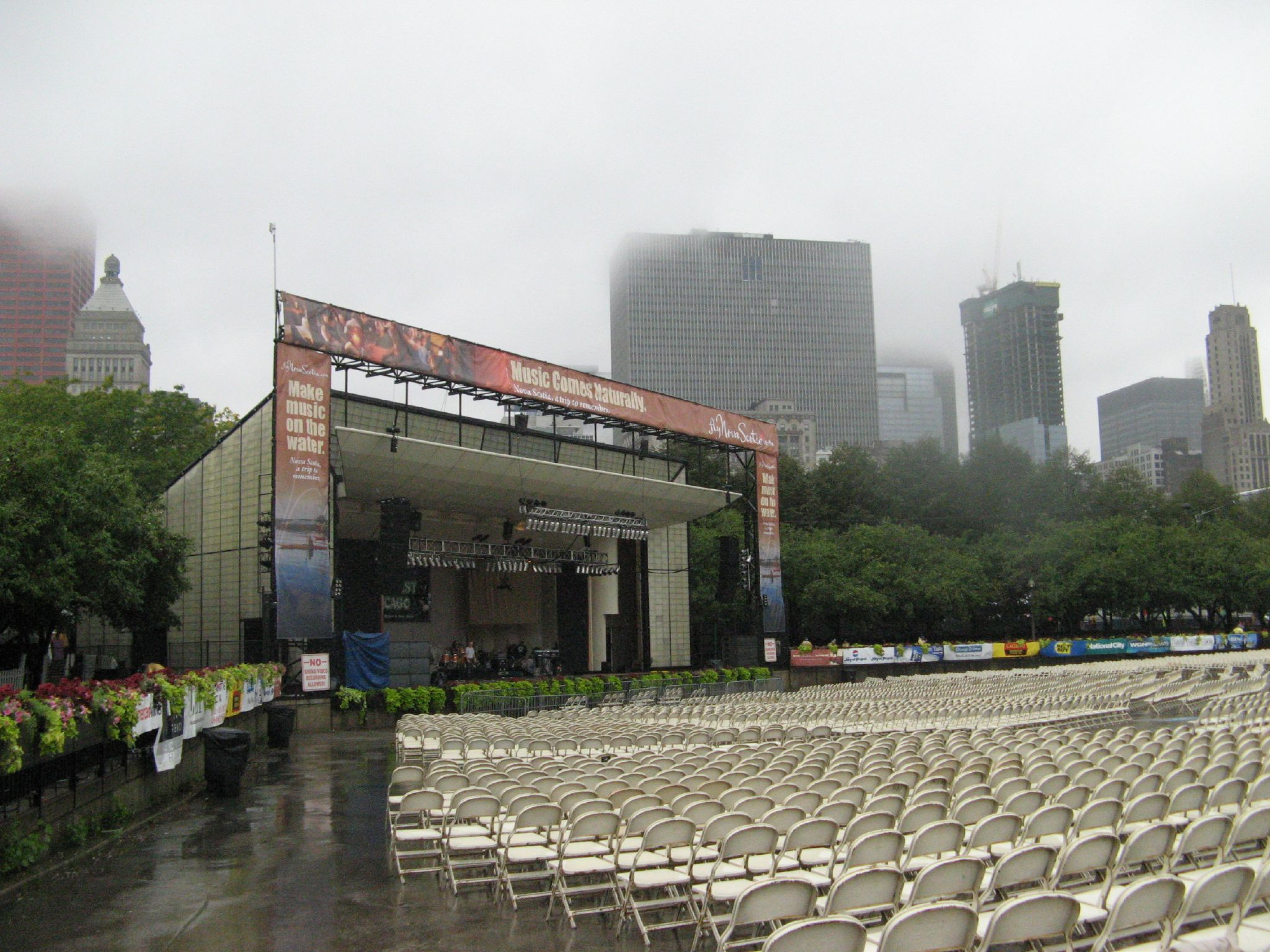
Left-side view of the Music Shell.

Concerts began at the band shell in August 1931. In July 1932, Franklin Delano Roosevelt made a campaign stop at the bandshell on his way to make his acceptance speech as the Democratic nominee for president at the 1932 Democratic National Convention at Chicago Stadium.

In 1934, the twenty-two separate parks merged under the Park Consolidation Act, in order to gain New Deal federal funding. Mayor Edward Kelley named Chicago Federation of Musicians President Petrillo to the board of the Chicago Park District. Petrillo suggested a free symphonic concert series in Grant Park. Under the agreement, Petrillo would raise money for the first season and if it was well-attended, the Park District would continue the program. The first season of the Grant Park Music Festival began on July 1, 1935, and ran until Labor Day with a total of sixty-five concerts. The Chicago Symphony Orchestra, the Women's Symphony Orchestra and the Civic Opera Orchestra each performed five or six times. Large concert bands led by Bohumir Kryl, Armin Hand, Max Bendix, George Dasch, Glenn Bainum, and Victor Grabel also performed. By the end of the summer crowds of up to 35,000 were attending nightly free concerts. The summer's total attendance was estimated at 1.9 million. This was viewed as a sufficient success that the Park District committed to assuming financial responsibility for the entire ongoing annual outdoor concert series. The concerts for the first season were also broadcast on nationwide radio broadcasts.

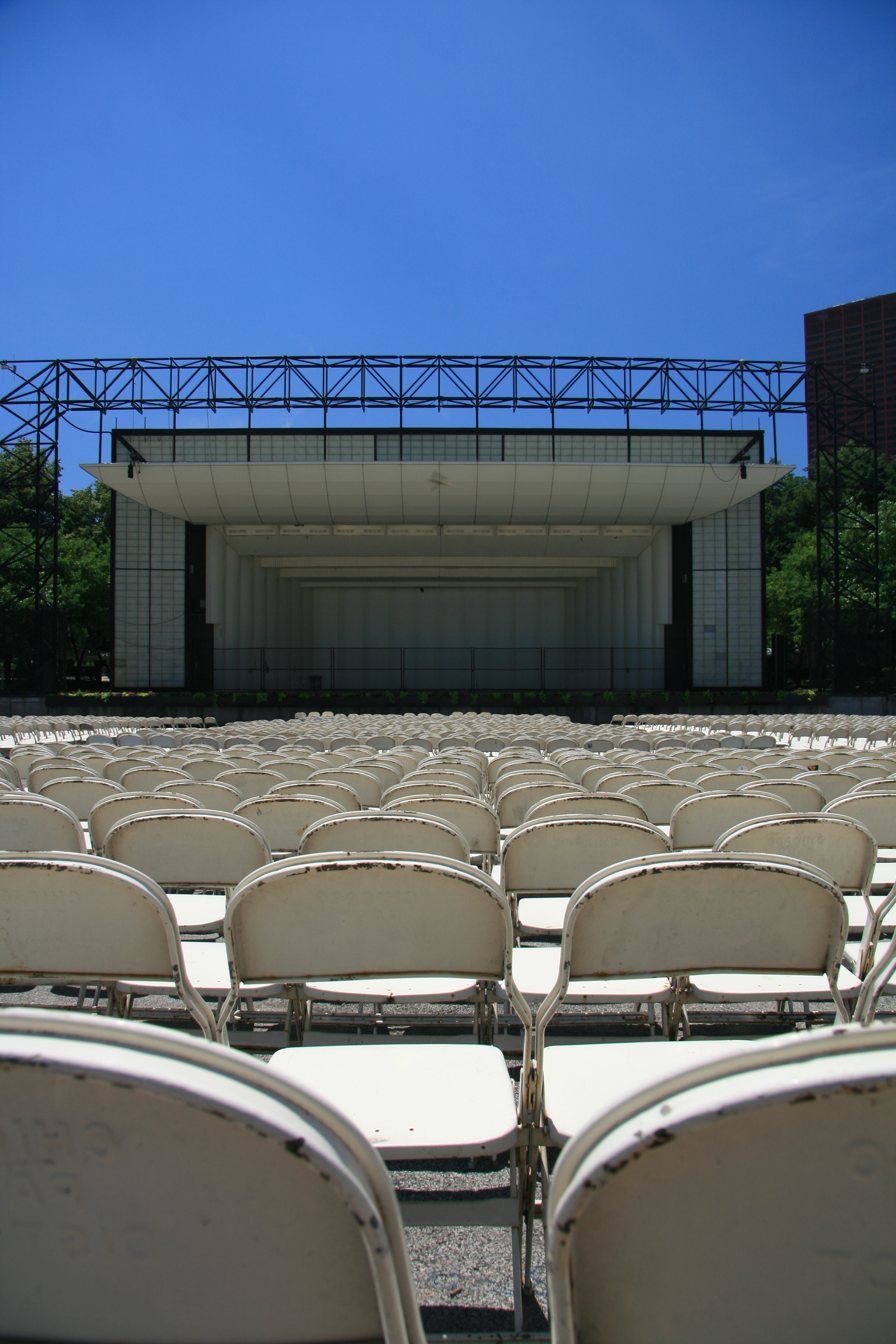
View of the bandshell from the seats.

The bandshell hosted symbolic events during World War II. The July 1942 celebration of the city's 10,000th United States Navy recruit with a 500-sailor representation from Navy Pier to salute the color guard was held at the band shell. In 1944, a public address system was added and following the war Grant Park usage increased heavily.

Between the scheduling of Van Cliburn's 1958 Grant Park Music Festival appearance and his actual July 16 appearance, he won the quadrennial International Tchaikovsky Competition in Moscow that April. He was catapulted to international fame for winning one of the world's elite music competitions. As a result, he was greeted with a celebration that included a ticker tape parade down Michigan Avenue, and his Grant Park Music Festival appearance was a major event. The following year, the band shell served as the host location for three concerts for the opening celebration of the 1959 Pan American Games.

In 1978, the new band shell began hosting events such as Taste of Chicago, an annual July 3 Independence Day fireworks celebration, the Chicago Blues, Jazz and Gospel Festivals. In October 1979, Pope John Paul II presided over the largest public mass ever held in Chicago on a terraced altar platform that was erected next to the band shell. Joseph Bernardin delivered a homily on the same kind of platform after being promoted to Archbishop of Roman Catholic Archdiocese of Chicago. The Dalai Lama has held an event at the band shell and rallies celebrating the National Basketball Association championships by the Chicago Bulls occurred at the band shell. It also served as the venue for Harold Washington's second mayoral inauguration in 1987. In 1998, at a Grant Park Music Festival performance, the miniature prototype of the Talaske-designed audio system that would eventually be used at the Jay Pritzker Pavilion was tested.

Since 2005, the Music Shell has been used as a stage for the annual Lollapalooza festival.

== Controversies ==
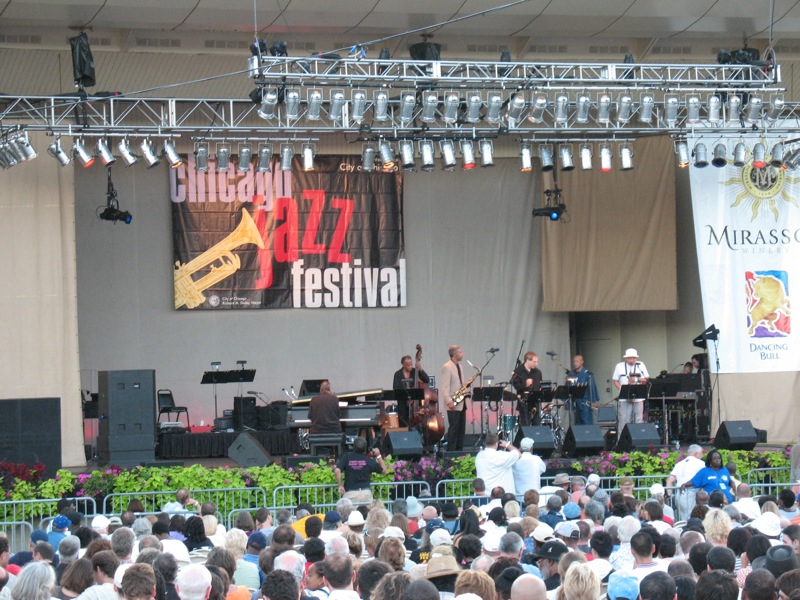
2007 Chicago Jazz Festival

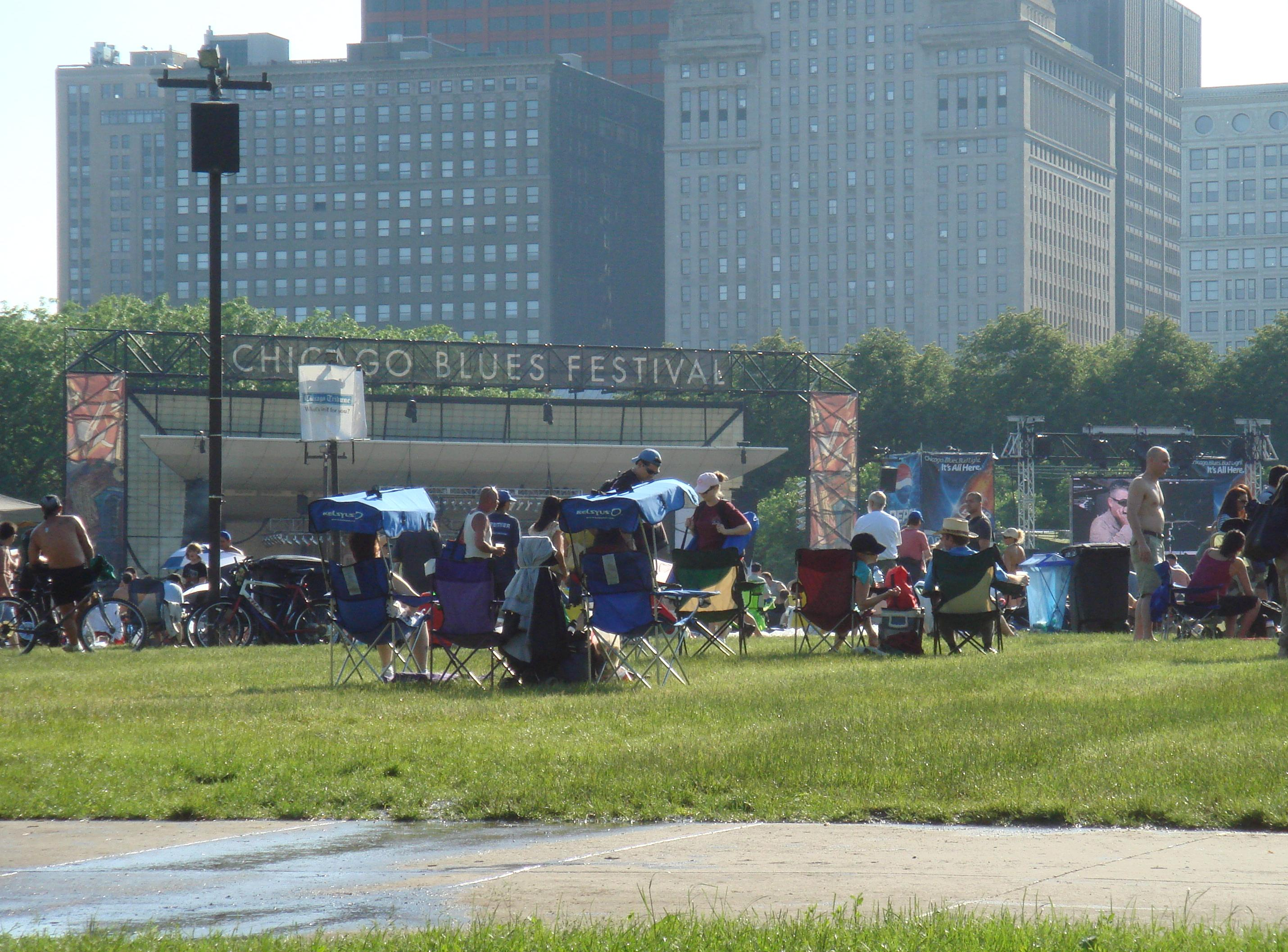
2008 Chicago Blues Festival

When the Pritzker Pavilion was built members of the Petrillo family wanted it named after James Petrillo. There has been much debate about which concerts and festivals should remain at the Petrillo and which should be moved to the Pritzker Pavilion. The initial plan was that the larger annual music festivals such as the Blues and Jazz Festivals and Taste of Chicago would continue to be held in Petrillo Music Shell because they are too large to be hosted at the Pavilion. However, smaller festivals such as the Chicago Gospel Music Festival have been hosted at the Pavilion since 2005. There has been public opinion that some of the Blues and Jazz Festival smaller events should be moved to the better and more modern acoustics of the Pavilion. By 2009, as the city grappled with a budget deficit, it considered realigning parts of the larger festivals with the more modern venue and made definite plans to move some of the smaller ones there.

== Notes ==
^AGeneral admission seating includes the Petrillo Lawn and Butler Field.

== Bibliography ==
- Gilfoyle, Timothy J. (2006). Millennium Park: Creating a Chicago Landmark. Chicago: University of Chicago Press. ISBN 978-0-226-29349-3.
- Knox, Janice A. & Heather Olivia Belcher (2002). Then & Now: Chicago's Loop. Arcadia Publishing. ISBN 0-7385-1968-5.
- Macaluso, Tony, Julia S. Bachrach, and Neal Samors (2009). Sounds of Chicago's Lakefront: A Celebration Of The Grant Park Music Festival. Chicago's Book Press. ISBN 978-0-9797892-6-7.
