= Chicago Now Vol. 2 =

Studio album by Ernest Dawkins
- Released: 1997
- Recorded: September 9 & 10, 1994
- Studio: Streeterville Studios, Chicago
- Genre: Jazz
- Length: 74:52
- Label: Silkheart
- Producer: Ernest Dawkins

Ernest Dawkins chronology
Chicago Now Vol. 1 (1995)	Chicago Now Vol. 2 (1997)	Mother's Blue Velvet Shoes (1998)

Chicago Now Vol. 2 is an album by American jazz saxophonist Ernest Dawkins' New Horizons Ensemble, which was recorded in 1994 and released on the Swedish Silkheart label.

== Reception ==
Professional ratings
Review scores
Source	Rating
AllMusic	4/5 stars

In his review for AllMusic, Scott Yanow states "It is obvious that these six musicians had spent a lot of time playing together because they react quickly to each other, share the lead, and often speak as in one voice. A superior and well-played set that should even interest jazz listeners who claim to not enjoy the avant-garde."

== Track listing ==
All compositions by Ernest Dawkins except as indicated

1. "Monk's Temptation" – 10:58
2. "Runnin' from the Rain (alt)" – 9:35
3. "Planet East" – 10:38
4. "Zera (alt)" – 12:56
5. "Improvisations #3" – 11:04
6. "Looking for Ninny" (Ameen Muhammad) – 4:34
7. "Many Favors" – 13:04

== Personnel ==
- Ernest Dawkins – alto sax, tenor sax, flute, percussion, vocal
- Steve Berry – trombone, percussion
- Ameen Muhammad - trumpet, percussion, vocal
- Jeff Parker – electric guitar
- Yosef Ben Israel – bass
- Reggie Nicholson - drums, percussion
