= Jo'burg Jump =

Studio album by Ernest Dawkins
- Released: 2000
- Recorded: June 7 & 8, 2000
- Studio: Riverside Studio, Chicago
- Genre: Jazz
- Length: 63:44
- Label: Delmark
- Producer: Robert G. Koester

Ernest Dawkins chronology
Mother's Blue Velvet Shoes (1998)	Jo'burg Jump (2000)	Cape Town Shuffle (2003)

Jo'burg Jump is an album by American jazz saxophonist Ernest Dawkins' New Horizons Ensemble, which was recorded in 2000 and released on Delmark. The album title was inspired by a visit to Johannesburg, South Africa.

== Reception ==
Professional ratings
Review scores
Source	Rating
AllMusic	4/5 stars
The Penguin Guide to Jazz	3/4 stars

In his review for AllMusic, Alex Henderson states "Dawkins' band favors an inside/outside approach, and its influences range from Charles Mingus and Sun Ra to the Art Ensemble of Chicago and other AACM artists."

The Penguin Guide to Jazz notes "In so far as there is a 'Chicago sound' associated with the AACM, this is it."

The All About Jazz review by Mark Corroto says "Dawkins write charts that draw from big band sounds pairing horns up to locomotive rhythms, something he took from his tenure with the Ethnic Heritage Ensemble and his travel in South Africa."

In his review for JazzTimes John Murph states "Sonically, the New Horizons Ensemble fits somewhere between Henry Threadgill's Very Very Circus and Ed Wilkerson's 8 Bold Souls.. Influences aside, what makes New Horizons Ensemble so intriguing is how it's able to assimilate various AACM touchstones and make them sound accessible-well, comparatively speaking."

== Track listing ==
All compositions by Ernest Dawkins except as indicated

1. "Stranger" – 7:44
2. "Jo'burg Jump" – 9:58
3. "The Gist of It" – 11:50
4. "Shorter Suite" (Steve Berry) – 10:54
5. "Goldinger" – 8:23
6. "Turtle Island Dance" – 5:02
7. "Transcension" – 9:53

== Personnel ==
- Ernest Dawkins - tenor sax, alto sax, percussion
- Ameen Muhammad – trumpet, conch shell, percussion
- Steve Berry – trombone, percussion
- Yosef Ben Israel – bass
- Avreeayl Ra – drums
- Jeff Parker – guitar on 4
