= South Side Street Songs =

Studio album by Ernest Dawkins
- Released: 1994
- Recorded: January 15 & 16, 1993
- Studio: Sparrow Sound Design, Chicago
- Genre: Jazz
- Length: 65:47
- Label: Silkheart
- Producer: Ernest Dawkins

Ernest Dawkins chronology
After the Dawn Has Risen (1992)	South Side Street Songs (1994)	Chicago Now, Vol. 1 (1995)

South Side Street Songs is an album by American jazz saxophonist Ernest Dawkins' New Horizons Ensemble, which was recorded in 1993 and released on the Swedish Silkheart label. "Maghostut" is dedicated to bassist Malachi Favors, who replaced Ben Israel on New Horizons' first European tour in 1986, and also to the Art Ensemble of Chicago. "El Hajj" is for El Hajj Malik El Shabazz (Malcolm X).

== Reception ==
Professional ratings
Review scores
Source	Rating
AllMusic	4/5 stars
The Penguin Guide to Jazz	3/4 stars

In his review for AllMusic, Scott Yanow says that the band "perform eight diverse pieces which cover a variety of moods, are not shy to swing, and temporarily embrace melodies. Each selection is stirring and full of surprises and fire."

The Penguin Guide to Jazz notes that "The influence of the Art Ensemble of Chicago weighs heavily" on the album.

The Cadence Magazine review by Glenn Good says "Given the strength of South Side Street Songs, it is almost frightening to think that this band probably still has a lot of unrealized potential. Certainly the broad stylistic terrain mapped out here would reward further exploration. In the meantime, we have this noteworthy milestone, which ranks with the best of Silkheart's stellar jazz catalog.".

== Track listing ==
All compositions by Ernest Dawkins

1. "Whence to Whither" – 14:01
2. "Maghostut" – 8:50
3. "Goldfinger" – 6:15
4. "Half-Step for Granny" – 3:47
5. "Ashes and Dust" – 5:46
6. "El Hajj" – 4:43
7. "Just Is Me" – 13:06
8. "Maghostut Two" – 8:59

== Personnel ==
- Ernest Dawkins – alto sax, tenor sax, flute
- Steve Berry – trombone
- Ameen Muhammad - trumpet
- Jeff Parker – electric guitar
- Yosef Ben Israel – bass
- Avreeayl Ra - drums
