= HotHouse (jazz club) =

Cultural center in Chicago

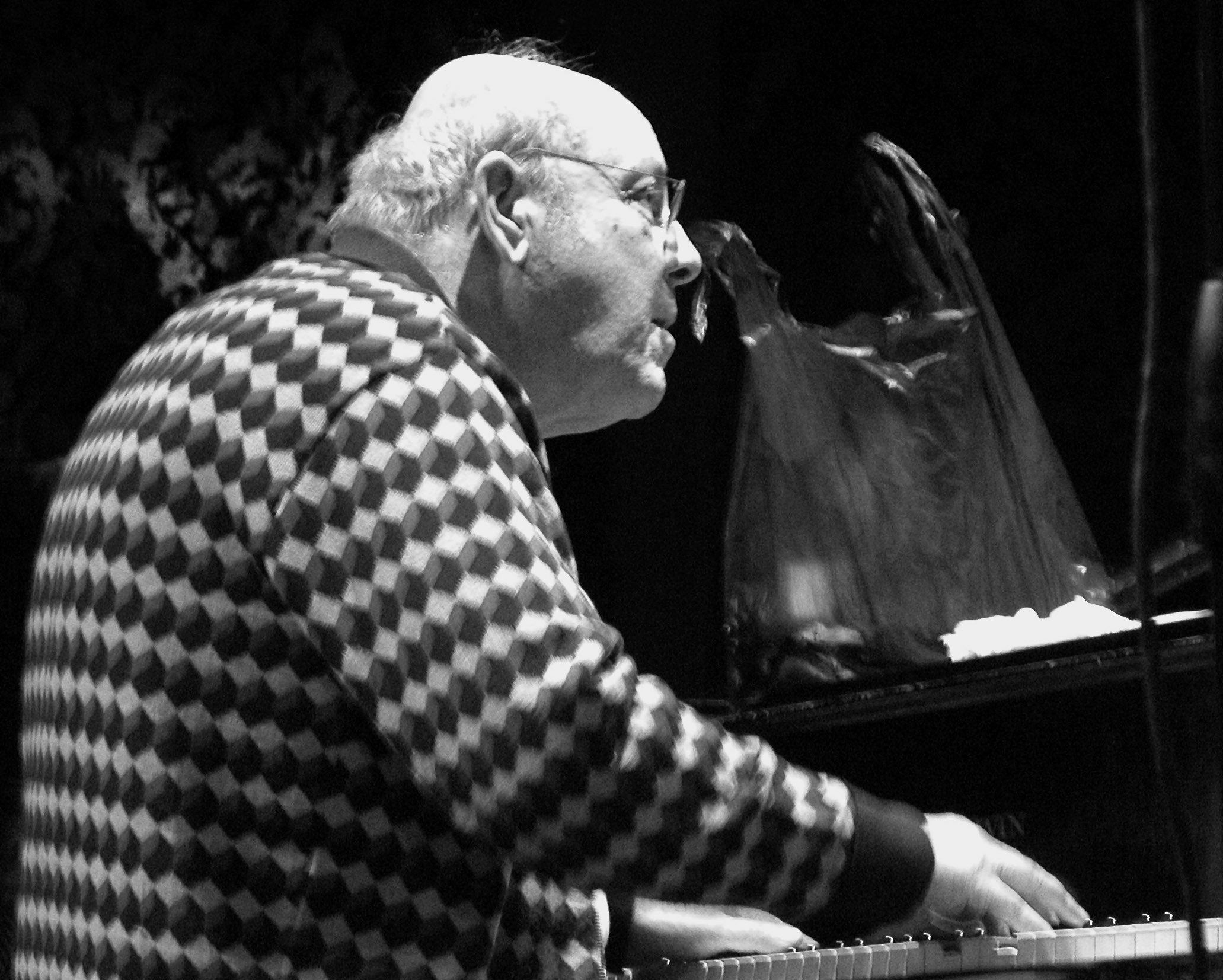
Jazz pianist Misha Mengelberg performing with the ICP Orchestra at the HotHouse in Chicago, November 2004

The HotHouse is a cultural center last located in the South Loop, Chicago, United States, and known for its program of jazz and world music concerts and as a central meeting place for a variety of community groups. The club on Balbo Avenue closed in July 2007 and the current board organizes programming around the region while building a new permanent site for operations.

The Center for International Performance and Exhibition (colloquially called HotHouse), was founded by Marguerite Horberg in 1987 at 1565 N. Milwaukee Ave, Chicago. In 1995, following the gentrification of the locality, Wicker Park, the venue, with support from the MacArthur Foundation, moved to a 9,000 sq ft (840 m^{2}) second floor space at 31 E. Balbo Ave. The venue had a large main room with booths and dance floor with a room for catered events and art shows and put on a varied and inclusive programme of music. Performers at the Hothouse included Roscoe Mitchell, Gil Scott-Heron, Maria Rita, Henry Threadgill, Susie Ibarra, Savina Yannatou, Dewey Redman and Olu Dara. Since 2007, HotHouse has organized over 100 programs as itinerant presenters and has produced a number of year- long thematic and multi-disciplinary events such as the WPA 2.0, A Brand New Deal, The African Jubilee and Old and New Dreams. HotHouse has been awarded with many of the top honors in the Arts and Culture industry including: Best of Chicago, Chicagoan of the Year, and The Abbey.

The HotHouse is also a forum for social issues and would host a benefit or offer support on issues such as the rights of undocumented workers or hurricane Katrina.
