= Ernest Dawkins =

American jazz saxophonist

- Born: 2 November 1953 (age 72); Chicago, Illinois, United States
- Origin: American
- Genre: Jazz
- Occupation: Musician
- Instrument: Saxophone
- Formerly of: Ethnic Heritage Ensemble
- Website: ernestdawkins.com

Ernest Dawkins (born 2 November 1953 in Chicago, Illinois, United States) is an American jazz saxophonist, principally active in free jazz and post-bop.

Ernest Khabeer Dawkins was a neighbor of Anthony Braxton as a child. He played bass and drums early in life before switching to saxophone in 1973. During that decade he began studying with members of the Association for the Advancement of Creative Musicians, such as Joseph Jarman and Chico Freeman, as well as at the Vandercook College of Music. He worked with Ed Wilkerson and the Ethnic Heritage Ensemble and Douglas Ewart before founding his own New Horizons Ensemble, which played regularly in Chicago into the 2000s, as well as at jazz festivals and on tour in Europe.

Starting in 1999 through at least 2026, Dawkins has run the annual Englewood Jazz Festival in the Englewood neighborhood of Chicago's South Side. Usually, Dawkins himself is one of the festival's performers.

== Discography ==
=== As leader ===
- After the Dawn Has Risen (Open Minds, 1992)
- South Side Street Songs (Silkheart Records, 1994)
- Chicago Now Vol. 1 (Silkheart, 1995)
- Chicago Now Vol. 2 (Silkheart, 1997)
- Mother's Blue Velvet Shoes (Dawk, 1998)
- Jo'burg Jump (Delmark Records, 2000)
- Cape Town Shuffle (Delmark, 2003)
- Misconception of a Delusion Shades of a Charade (Dawk, 2003)
- Mean Ameen (Delmark, 2004)
- The Messenger (CD and DVD) (Delmark, 2006)
- A Black Op'Era: Dedicated to Chairman Fred Hampton recorded live at Sons d'hiver Festival 2006 in Paris (Dawk, 2007)
- Un-Till Emmett Till (Dawk, 2009)
- The Prairie Prophet (Delmark, 2011)
- Velvet Songs (RogueArt), 2011)
- Afro Straight (Delmark, 2012)
- Memory in the Center (Dawk, 2014)

=== As unofficial leader/co-leader ===
with The (AACM) Great Black Music Ensemble

- Sparx of Love, Sparx of Fire! A Tribute to Martin Sparx Alexander (Great Black Ensemble, 2008)
- At Umbria Jazz 2009 (Musica Jazz, 2010)
- Live @ The Currency Exchange Cafe, Vol. 1 (AACM Chicago Productions, 2018 or 2019)

=== As guest ===
With Hamid Drake

- Bindu (Rogueart, 2005)

with Ethnic Heritage Ensemble

- The Continuum (Delmark, 1997)
- Papa's Bounce (CIMP, 1998)
- Freedom Jazz Dance (Delmark, 1999)
