= Fashion Targets Breast Cancer =

UK health charity

Fashion Targets Breast Cancer is a charity campaign originally launched in the UK in 1996 by Breakthrough Breast Cancer, and now operated under the charity's new name Breast Cancer Now. Corporate partners for the campaign represent famous high-street brands, including M & S, Topshop, and River Island. M & S has sold a wide range of charitable women's clothes for Breast Cancer Now for many years. The campaign is best known for its famous 'target' logo T-shirt designed by Ralph Lauren. Since 1996, Fashion Targets Breast Cancer has raised over £14 million to fund pioneering breast cancer research.

== Campaigns ==
- 2016 - Naomi Campbell and Kate Moss
- 2015 - Foxes, Abbey Clancy, Lily Donaldson, and Alice Dellal
- 2014 - Emeli Sandé, Jessica Ennis-Hill and Laura Bailey
- 2013 - Sharon Osbourne, Kelly Osbourne, Pearl Lowe and Daisy Lowe
- 2012 - Georgia May Jagger and Pixie Geldof
- 2011 - Cat Deeley, Karen Gillan and Sadie Frost
- 2010 - Kylie Minogue, Claudia Schiffer and Sienna Miller
- 2009 - Million Model Catwalk - Leah Wood, Sarah, Duchess of York, Jade Jagger, Bryan Ferry, Abigail Clancy, Sara Cox, Duncan James and June Sarpong
- 2008 - Anna Friel, Natalie Imbruglia, Alan Carr, Edith Bowman and Twiggy
- 2007 - Sophie Dahl
- 2006 - Claudia Schiffer, Helena Christensen, Eva Herzigova, Jerry Hall, Yasmin Le Bon, Erin O'Connor, Laura Bailey, Lily Cole, Jasmine Guinness and Liberty Ross
- 2005 - Jade Jagger
- 2004 - Elle Macpherson
- 2003 - Jodie Kidd, Edith Bowman
- 2002 - Helena Christensen
- 2000 - Gisele Bündchen, Twiggy and Kate Moss
- 1998 - Yasmin Le Bon
- 1996 - Naomi Campbell, Christy Turlington and Saffron Aldridge

== See also ==
- List of Marks & Spencer brands
