= Mick Jagger (Warhol) =

1975 series of portraits by Andy Warhol

- Artist: Andy Warhol
- Year: 1975
- Medium: Acrylic and silkscreen ink on canvas
- Movement: Pop Art
- Subject: Mick Jagger
- Dimensions: 101.6 cm × 101.6 cm (40.0 in × 40.0 in)

Mick Jagger is a silkscreen portrait by American artist Andy Warhol, created in 1975. It depicts English musician Mick Jagger, lead singer of the Rolling Stones. Warhol and Jagger had been friends since the Rolling Stones first toured the United States in 1964. In 1975, Jagger commissioned a portrait, resulting in a series of paintings based on Polaroid photographs taken by Warhol. Warhol also produced a portfolio of ten screenprints, issued in an edition of 250 that were signed by Warhol and Jagger.

== Background ==
Pop artist Andy Warhol first met musician Mick Jagger in June 1964, when British magazine editor Nicky Haslam arranged a party at socialite Jane Holzer's Park Avenue apartment in Manhattan. (Note: Warhol's book Popism incorrectly dates the party as 1963, but the Rolling Stones first toured the US in 1964.) Jagger was in New York with the Rolling Stones for their first American tour. They met again in October 1964 at the "Mods and Rockers Ball," a party held at photographer Jerry Schatzberg's studio to celebrate the Rolling Stones during their second American tour.

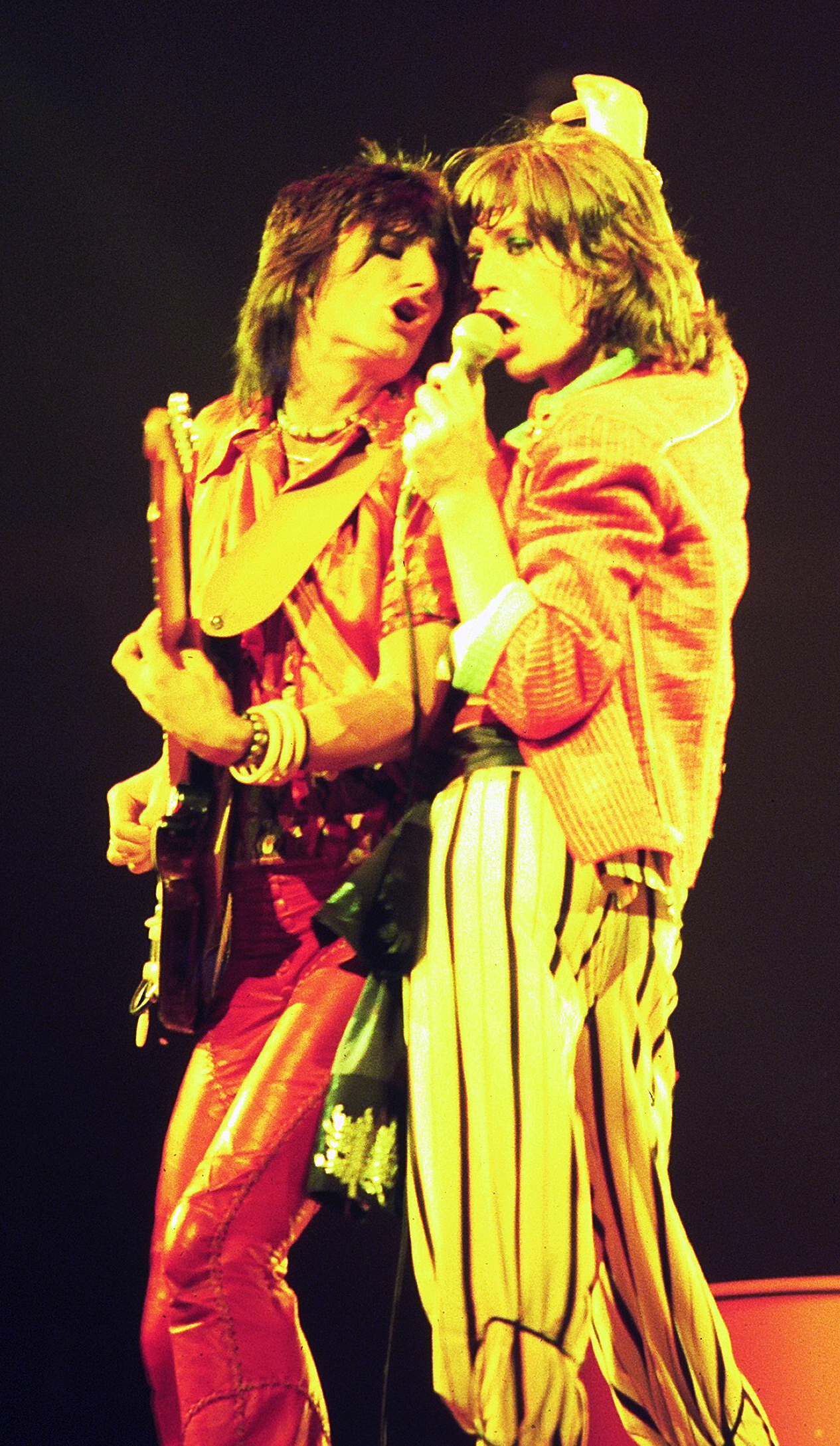
Ronnie Wood and Jagger performing at a Rolling Stones concert in Chicago, 1975

They eventually became close friends and spent time together whenever Jagger was in New York. Warhol designed the cover of the Rolling Stones album Sticky Fingers (1971), which received a Grammy Award nomination for Best Recording Package. Warhol attended the Rolling Stones concerts at Madison Square Garden in July 1972, and Jagger's 29th birthday party at the St. Regis Hotel in New York City on July 26, 1972.

In summer of 1972, Jagger and his wife Bianca Jagger were interviewed by socialite Lee Radziwill for Andy Warhol's Interview at Warhol's estate Eothen in Montauk, New York. In 1973, Warhol and his boyfriend Jed Johnson along with their dachshund Archie traveled with the Jaggers and their daughter Jade Jagger to the Amalfi Coast, where they visited writer Gore Vidal at his villa, La Rondinaia.

In 1975, the Rolling Stones rehearsed for their upcoming Tour of the Americas '75 at Warhol's Eothen estate. On July 2, 1975, Warhol attended their concert at Capital Centre in Landover, Maryland, with Bianca Jagger, Johnson, and Interview editor Bob Colacello. That year, Jagger commissioned a portrait of himself from Warhol. Jagger rented the main house at Eothen again in 1976. The following year, Warhol designed the cover artwork for the Rolling Stones live album Love You Live (1977).

Warhol and Jagger continued to socialize frequently throughout the decade, much of which Warhol recorded in his diary. Warhol included photographs of Jagger in his book Exposures (1979). Jagger also appeared on the cover of Warhol's Interview magazine several times, including the second issue in 1969, its seventh issue in 1970, (Note: The source says 1969, but Interview was founded in late 1969. Issue 7 was in 1970.) the December 1977 issue with Iman and Paul von Ravenstein, and the August 1981 and February 1985 issues.

== Production ==
Warhol based the silkscreen paintings of Jagger on two Polaroid photographs showing the musician in different poses. In one, Jagger faces to the left while looking toward the camera; in the other, he faces the camera with his armpit visible.

Warhol produced several versions of Jagger's portrait. According to Colacello, Warhol and his circle wanted to have an unveiling lunch at the Factory, but Jagger declined to participate. Jagger instead visited Warhol's studio alone to view the work. Colacello recalled that Jagger, "known for his frugality," ultimately selected three of the most flattering versions, and Warhol continued to present the unselected portraits at subsequent lunches.

In addition to the paintings, Warhol produced a portfolio of screenprints and related drawings. Warhol selected and manipulated different photographic images of Jagger, experimenting with variations in color, line, and composition. The portfolio consists of ten screenprints in an edition of 250 with additional artist's proofs. The prints were signed by both Warhol and Jagger. The portfolio was published in 1975 by Seabird Editions in London and printed by Alexander Heinrici in New York. The portfolio was also made into ten postcards produced by Castelli Graphics.

== Description ==
A set of Mick Jagger screenprints

Each Mick Jagger painting measures 40 × 40 inches (101.6 × 101.6 cm). Jagger is depicted in close-up with his pouting lips, while Warhol highlights the contours of his face through bold outlines and areas of saturated color. The surface has silkscreen inks accumulating unevenly across the canvas to create a gestural effect. Warhol added hand-drawn marks that extend and accentuate the contours of Jagger's features. The portraits vary in color and share the aesthetic of many of Warhol's paintings produced between 1975 and 1976, which were characterized by "soft and pastel, with faraway eyes, lost under azure, mint, or lavender."

The Mick Jagger screenprints each measure approximately 43 × 29 inches (109.2 × 73.7 cm). As in Warhol's Ladies and Gentlemen series, Warhol incorporated collage-like elements by superimposing Jagger's face over irregular shapes resembling torn and overlapping pieces of colored paper that range from gold, silver and pewter to black, pink and green. Although they appear to be collaged materials, the colored patches were themselves produced through silkscreening. The technique added visual complexity to the compositions and gave the portraits a more expressive and deliberately constructed appearance.

== Interpretation ==
Art critic David Bourdon referred to Jagger as an ideal subject for Warhol's celebrity portraiture like Marlon Brando, James Dean, and Elvis, calling him "not just another pretty face, but sullen, brooding, and turbulent." Bourdon noted that Jagger's long hair, pouty lips, long neck, and bare shoulders gave the portraits the appearance of a glamour photograph. Warhol similarly described Jagger's appeal in his book Exposures (1979):

Mick brings out the bisexuality in men who normally would not be like that. He's androgynous enough for almost anyone. That's always been his basic appeal, mixed with the facts that: 1) He's very talented; 2) He's very intelligent; 3) He's very handsome; 4) He's very adorable; 5) He's a great business person; 6) He's a great movie star; 7) I like his fake Cockney accent.

Bourdon emphasized that Warhol "incorporated passages of drawing" into the screenprints. Unlike the "calligraphic scribbles" in Warhol's Mao portraits, the drawn elements in the Jagger images "actually constitute part of the likeness," sometimes overlapping or replacing photographic details. Warhol used these marks to "enrich and energize" the images while creating a "handmade look by mechanical means."

== Exhibitions ==
The Mick Jagger and Ladies and Gentlemen print portfolios were exhibited at the Max Protetch Gallery in Washington, D.C., in December 1975. The Mick Jagger prints were subsequently exhibited in Andy Warhol: Mick Jagger at Corcoran and Greenberg, Inc. in Coral Gables from January to February 1976. They were also included in the group exhibition Great Modern Prints at the Equinox Gallery in Vancouver from January to February 1976.

From March 16 to April 30, 1976, the Freeman-Anacker Gallery in New Orleans presented an exhibition of Warhol's remaining Mick Jagger portraits, along with his Mao, Ladies and Gentlemen, and Hand Colored Flowers works. Warhol and his manager Fred Hughes attended a private preview and reception at the gallery on March 14.

Two Mick Jagger paintings were included in the retrospective Andy Warhol: Portraits of the '70s at the Whitney Museum of American Art in New York City from November 20, 1979, to January 17, 1980. An accompanying book was published by Random House.

== Critical reception ==
Writing in The Miami Herald, Griffin Smith described the collaboration between the "Pop superartist" and the "rock superstar" as potentially "the quintessence of our era." Smith noted that the "work represents a fusion of Warhol's printing techniques. It combines photo silk screen realism with abstraction, and the line drawing of his last flower series with new metallic textured areas of gold or pewter." He concluded, "The graphics are as dramatic as Jagger—Warhol himself is no shrinking violet—and range in mood from coolly pensive black and silvers like No. 4 to the flamingo No. 8, hot-lips red and gold. Dy-nо-mite."

Mary Fox of The Vancouver Sun described Warhol's Jagger screenprint as the "showpiece" of the exhibition Great Modern Prints at the Equniox, calling it a meeting between "the high priest of camp" and "the prince of heavy rock." She likened it as a "chic version" of the glossy publicity photographs collected by rock fans. Fox observed that Warhol "transforms the singer's rather plain face into that of a sensual, strutting, charismatic figure who entraps his audiences with his presence. Warhol" 'I was trying to make him look pretty.'"

Michael Andre, writing in ARTnews, described the portfolio as having four apparent sources: "Picasso's drawings; Interview magazine lewd graphics: 3-D; video line reductions." He characterized the prints as "garish and atrocious kitsch" to an "untrained eye," while noting, "If they sell out, they'll occupy about the same amount of flat space as the TV screens turned to 'Edge of Night' in Cleveland. His art, he says in effect, aspires to the condition of television."

== Collections ==
Warhol's Mick Jagger portraits are held in several museum collections. The painting depicting Jagger turned to the side against a plum-purple background is in the collection of the New Orleans Museum of Art in New Orleans. The work was gifted to the museum by Tina Freeman. The Museum of Fine Arts, Boston holds a second portrait depicting Jagger facing the viewer, set against swashes of purple, blue, and red. It was acquired from the Andy Warhol Foundation for the Visual Arts in 1993. The Andy Warhol Museum in Pittsburg has two paintings.

The National Portrait Gallery, London holds a screenprint from the ten-print Mick Jagger portfolio, which it acquired in 1980. The National Gallery of Art in Washington, D.C. also holds a print from the portfolio, which was gifted to the museum by Thomas G. Klarner in 1993.

== Art market ==
The prints were initially sold for $1,000 each, or $10,000 for the complete portfolio. They have since appreciated considerably in value, with individual prints now selling for more than $100,000.

In April 2008, the set Mick Jagger (F. & S. 138–47), each print numbered 'A.P.' (artist's proofs), sold for $421,000 at Christie's.

In February 2011, the painting Mick Jagger, against a steel blue background, sold for £881,250 at Christie's in London.

In April 2014, the set Mick Jagger, each print numbered 'A.P. 27/50' (artist's proofs), sold for $421,000 at Christie's.

In October 2022, one Mick Jagger print, numbered 57/250, sold for $214,200 at Christie's.

In October 2022, the set Mick Jagger, each print numbered 80/250, sold for $1,925,500 at Sotheby's.
