= Running Out of Luck =

1985 film by Julien Temple

- Directed by: Julien Temple
- Written by: Julien Temple; Mick Jagger
- Starring: Mick Jagger; Rae Dawn Chong; Dennis Hopper
- Cinematography: Oliver Stapleton
- Music by: Mick Jagger; Luis Jardim
- Release date: 1985
- Language: English

Running Out of Luck is a 1985 American adventure film directed by Julien Temple and starring Mick Jagger.

== Plot ==
Mick (Mick Jagger) is in Rio shooting a video. He is with his wife/girlfriend played by Jerry Hall. Mick performs "1/2 a Loaf" while the director, played by Dennis Hopper, screams and yells at Mick who is drunk. Mick and Jerry Hall are trying to make each other jealous. Jerry starts making out with a cabana boy which makes Mick disturbed. Mick picks up three girls and invites them to his trailer. On the way to the trailer, Mick starts feeling up the girls and realizes that they are not girls, and the three female imposters beat up and rob Mick and throw him in the back of a truck. Jerry Hall leaves Rio alone and meets a rich man in first class while Mick has found himself lost in the countryside of Brazil, seeing mirages and going crazy from the heat.

Mick is found by a plantation owner woman who rescues him and puts him to work. She also uses Mick as her sex slave. A truckload of prostitutes come to visit the plantation workers and Mick offers his shoes to a man who is roughing up a prostitute played by Rae Dawn Chong. Mick escapes the plantation by dressing up in drag and getting on the back of the truck when the prostitutes leave.

They try to get money by cheating at a casino back in Rio, and Mick got caught and thrown in jail. Rae helps him escape by drugging the warden and Mick goes back to London. Although everyone thinks Mick is dead, the press catch on to his return as he makes new music with a new band upstairs in a pub.

== Cast ==
- Mick Jagger as Mick
- Jerry Hall as Jerry
- Rae Dawn Chong as Slave Girl
- Dennis Hopper as Tobby, The Director
- Norma Bengell as Lola
- Grande Otelo as Rob
- Jim Broadbent as Jimmy
- Tonico Pereira as Truck Driver
- Ritchie as Popstar

== See also ==
- List of American films of 1985
