= Mick Jagger =

English musician and songwriter (born 1943)

Sir Mick Jagger
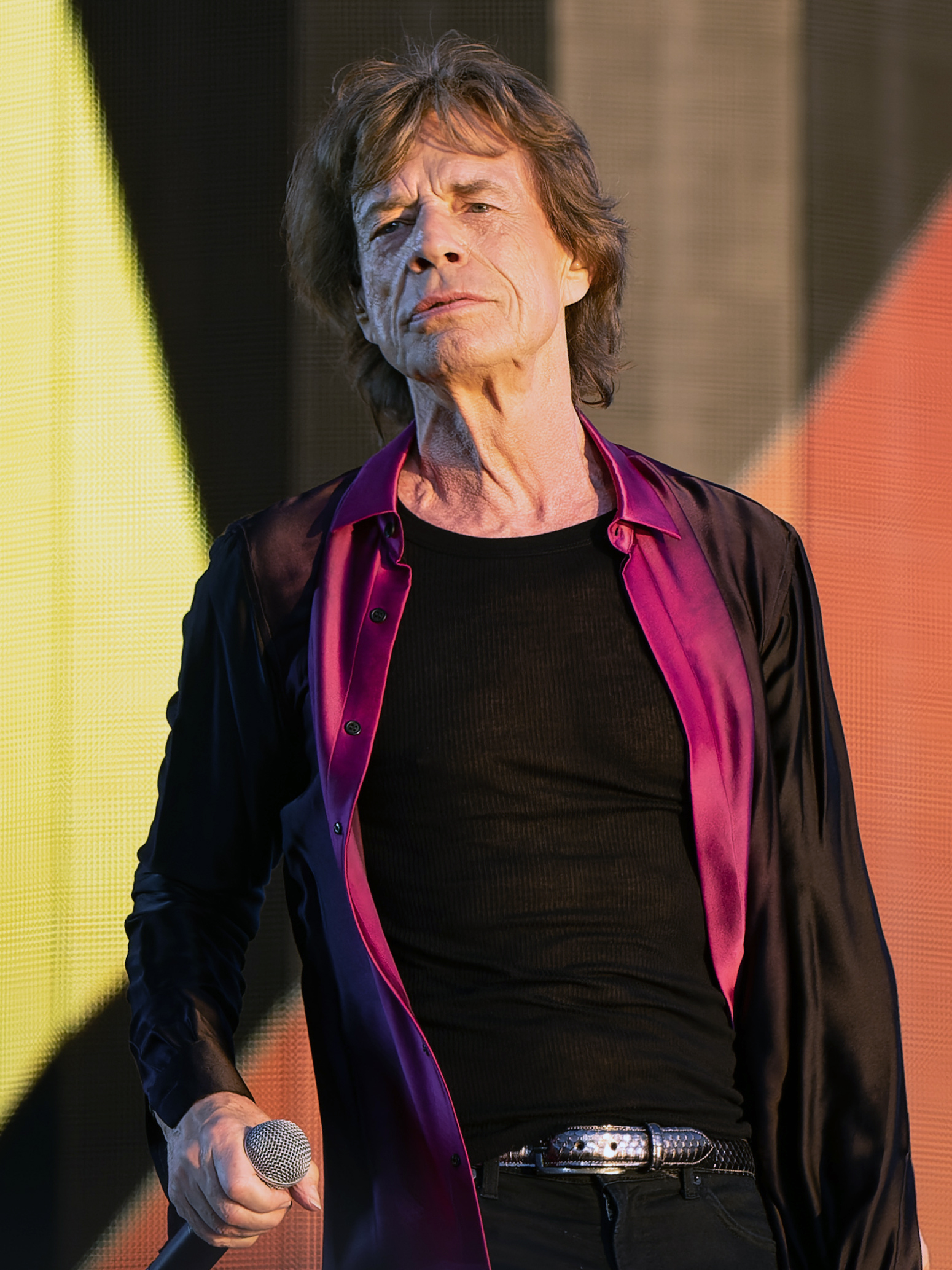
- Jagger in 2022
- Born: Michael Philip Jagger; 26 July 1943 (age 83); Dartford, Kent, England
- Education: London School of Economics and Political Science (dropped out)
- Occupations: Singer; songwriter; musician; actor; film producer; dancer
- Years active: 1960–present
- Spouse: Bianca Pérez-Mora Macias (m. 1971; div. 1979)
- Partners: Chrissie Shrimpton (1963–1966); Marianne Faithfull (1966–1970); Jerry Hall (1977–1999); L'Wren Scott (2001–2014; her death); Melanie Hamrick (2014–present)
- Children: 8; including Jade, Elizabeth, and Georgia May
- Relatives: Chris Jagger (brother)
- Musical career
- Genres: Rock; pop; blues; rock and roll; R&B; psychedelia
- Instruments: Vocals; guitar; harmonica
- Labels: Virgin; Rolling Stones; ABKCO; Universal; Atlantic
- Member of: The Rolling Stones
- Formerly of: SuperHeavy
- Website: mickjagger.com
- Mick Jagger's voice from the BBC programme Front Row, 26 December 2012

Sir Michael Philip Jagger (born 26 July 1943) is an English musician, songwriter, and film producer known as the lead singer and founder member of the Rolling Stones. Jagger has co-written most of the Stones' songs with lead guitarist Keith Richards; their songwriting partnership is one of the most successful in rock music history. His career has spanned more than six decades, and he has been widely described as one of the most popular and influential front men in the history of rock music. His distinctive voice and energetic live performances, along with Richards's guitar style, have been the Rolling Stones' trademark throughout the band's career. Early in his career, Jagger gained notoriety for his romantic involvements and illicit drug use, and has often been portrayed as a countercultural figure.

Jagger was born and grew up in Dartford. He studied at the London School of Economics before abandoning his studies to focus on his career with the Rolling Stones. In the early 1970s, Jagger starred in the films Performance (1970) and Ned Kelly (1970), to mixed receptions. Beginning in the 1980s, he released a number of solo works, including four albums and the single "Dancing in the Street", a 1985 duet with David Bowie that reached No. 1 in the UK and Australia and was a top-ten hit in other countries.

In the 2000s, Jagger co-founded a film production company, Jagged Films, and produced feature films through the company beginning with the 2001 historical drama Enigma. He was also a member of the supergroup SuperHeavy from 2009 to 2011. Although relationships with his bandmates, particularly Richards, deteriorated during the 1980s, Jagger has always found more success with the Rolling Stones than with his solo and side projects. He was married to Bianca Pérez-Mora Macias from 1971 to 1978, and has had several other relationships; he has eight children with five women.

In 1989, Jagger was inducted into the Rock and Roll Hall of Fame as a member of the Rolling Stones and, in 2004, into the UK Music Hall of Fame. As a Stones member and as a solo artist, he reached No. 1 on the UK and US singles charts with 13 singles, the top 10 with 32 singles and the top 40 with 70 singles. In 2003, he was knighted for his services to popular music. Jagger is credited with being a trailblazer in pop music and with bringing a style and sex appeal to rock and roll that have been imitated and proven influential with subsequent generations of musicians and entertainers.

== Early life and education ==
Michael Philip Jagger was born into a middle-class family in Dartford, Kent, on 26 July 1943. His father, Basil Fanshawe "Joe" Jagger, was a gymnast and physical education teacher who helped popularise basketball in Britain. His paternal grandfather, David Ernest Jagger, was also a teacher. His mother, Eva Ensley Mary (née Scutts), born in Sydney of English descent, was a hairdresser who was politically active in the Conservative Party in the United Kingdom. His parents were married in 1940 at Holy Trinity Church in Dartford. Jagger's younger brother, Chris (born 19 December 1947), is also a musician, and the two have performed together.

Although he was encouraged to follow his father's career path growing up, Jagger has said, "I always sang as a child. I was one of those kids who just liked to sing. Some kids sing in choirs; others like to show off in front of the mirror. I was in the church choir and I also loved listening to singers on the radio—the BBC or Radio Luxembourg—or watching them on TV and in the movies."

In September 1950, Keith Richards and Jagger first met as classmates at Wentworth Primary School in Dartford, prior to the Jagger family's 1954 move to Wilmington, Kent. The same year he passed the eleven-plus examination and attended Dartford Grammar School, which now has the Mick Jagger Centre performing arts venue. Jagger and Richards lost contact with each other when they went to different schools.

In the mid-1950s, Jagger began his music career, forming a garage band with his friend Dick Taylor. They played songs by Muddy Waters, Chuck Berry, Little Richard, Howlin' Wolf, and Bo Diddley. Jagger met Richards again on 17 October 1961 on Platform Two of Dartford railway station. The Chuck Berry and Muddy Waters records Jagger was carrying revealed a shared interest in rhythm and blues. A musical partnership began shortly afterwards. Richards and Taylor often met Jagger at his house. In late 1961, the meetings moved to Taylor's house, where Alan Etherington and Bob Beckwith joined the trio. The quintet called themselves the Blues Boys.

Jagger left school in 1961 after passing seven O-levels and two A-levels. He and Richards moved into a flat at Edith Grove in Chelsea, London, with guitarist Brian Jones. While Richards and Jones planned to start their own rhythm and blues group, Jagger continued to study finance and accounting on a government grant as an undergraduate student at the London School of Economics. He had seriously considered becoming either a journalist or a politician, comparing the latter to a pop star.

Brian Jones, using the name Elmo Lewis, began working at the Ealing Club, where a loose music ensemble known as Blues Incorporated was performing, under the leadership of Alexis Korner. Jones, Richards, and Jagger began playing with the group, with Jagger eventually becoming the band's lead singer. Jones, Richards, and Jagger began meeting on their own to practise, establishing the foundation for what would become the Rolling Stones.

== Career ==
=== 1960s ===
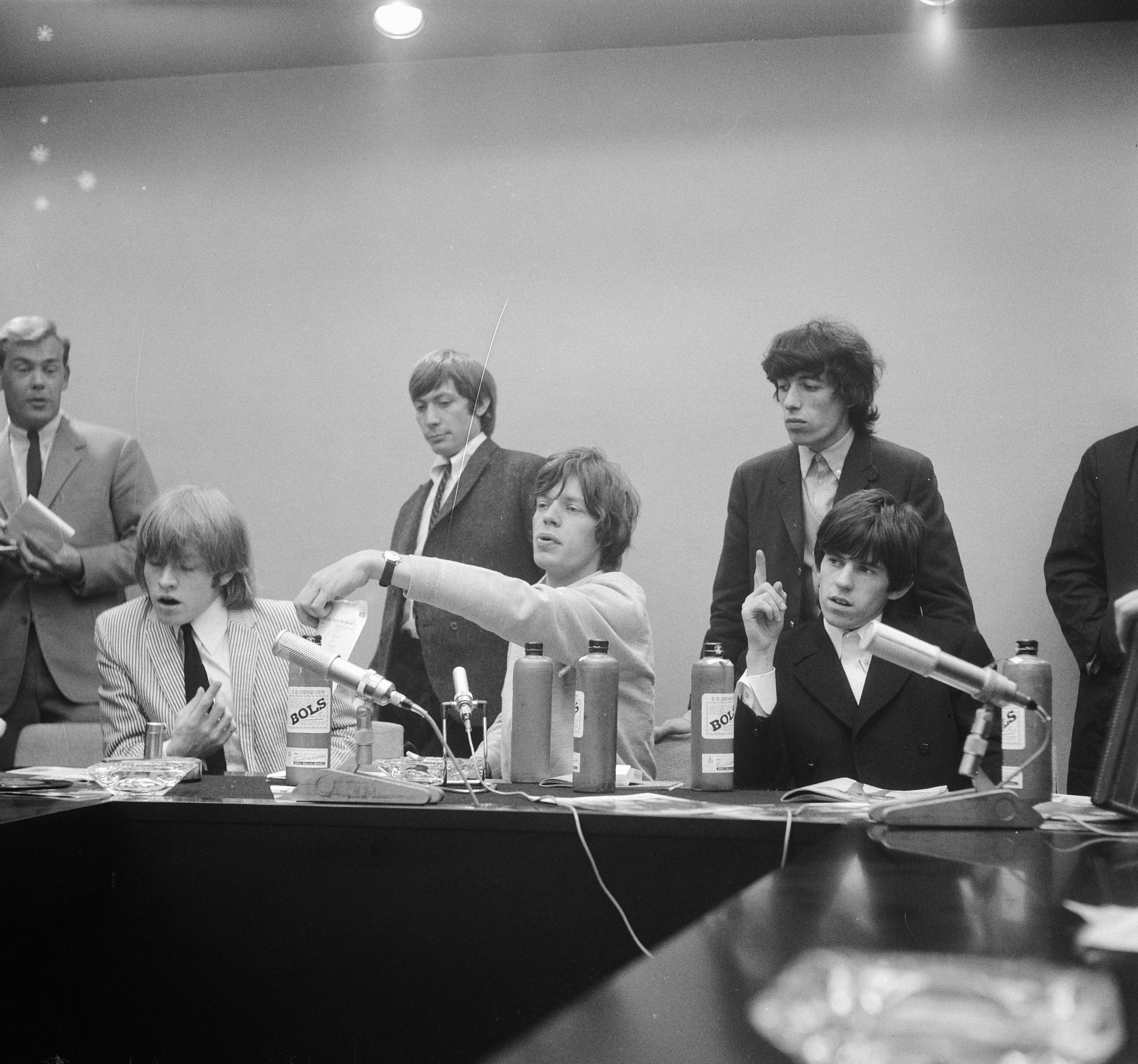
The Rolling Stones in August 1964. Left to right: guitarist Brian Jones, drummer Charlie Watts, Jagger, bass guitarist Bill Wyman, and lead guitarist Keith Richards

At the beginning of the Rolling Stones' founding in the early 1960s, the band mostly played for no money at a basement club opposite London's Ealing Broadway tube station, which was subsequently named Ferry's Club. The group had very little equipment and borrowed Korner's gear. Their first appearance, under the name the Rollin' Stones, after one of their favourite Muddy Waters songs, was at the Marquee Club, a London jazz club, on 12 July 1962. They later changed their name to the Rolling Stones, since it seemed more formal.

The initial band members included Jagger, Richards, Jones, Ian Stewart on piano, Dick Taylor on bass, and Tony Chapman on drums, but Richards wrote in Life, his memoir, "The drummer that night was Mick Avory—not Tony Chapman, as history has mysteriously handed it down". In June 1963, the band began a five-month residency at the Eel Pie Island Hotel, which the BBC later credited with shaping the band's career. That autumn, Jagger left the London School of Economics to pursue a musical career with the Rolling Stones.

The group initially played songs by American rhythm and blues artists, including Chuck Berry and Bo Diddley. Its first two UK No. 1 hits were covers of Bobby Womack's "It's All Over Now" and Willie Dixon's "Little Red Rooster". Encouraged by manager Andrew Loog Oldham, Jagger and Richards soon began writing their own songs. Their songwriting partnership took time to develop; one of their early compositions was "As Tears Go By", written for Marianne Faithfull, a young singer Loog Oldham was promoting.

For the Rolling Stones, the duo wrote "The Last Time", the group's third No. 1 single in the UK, based on "This May Be the Last Time", a traditional Negro spiritual the Staple Singers recorded in 1955. Jagger and Richards also wrote their first international hit, "(I Can't Get No) Satisfaction". It established the Rolling Stones' image as defiant troublemakers in contrast to the Beatles as "lovable moptop[s]". Jagger told Stephen Schiff in a 1992 Vanity Fair profile:

I wasn't trying to be rebellious in those days; I was just being me. I wasn't trying to push the edge of anything. I'm being me and ordinary, the guy from suburbia who sings in this band, but someone older might have thought it was just the most awful racket, the most terrible thing, and where are we going if this is music? [...] But all those songs we sang were pretty tame, really. People didn't think they were, but I thought they were tame.

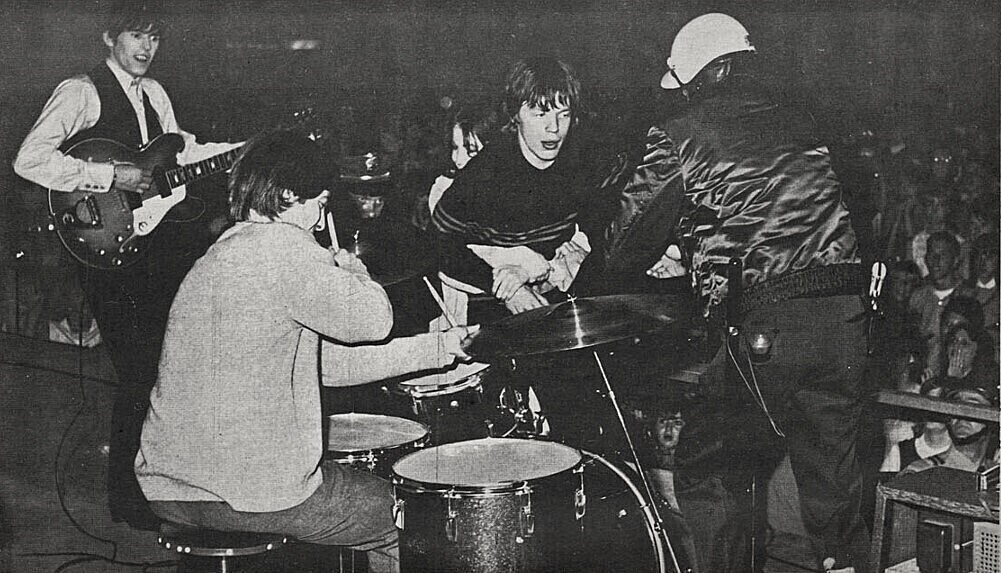
Jagger is rushed by a female fan during a 1965 performance in West Germany

The group's early albums, including Out of Our Heads, Aftermath, and Between the Buttons, were successful commercially. In 1967, Jagger, Richards, and Jones were hounded by authorities over their recreational drug use after the News of the World published a three-part feature, "Pop Stars and Drugs: Facts That Will Shock You". The feature described alleged LSD parties hosted by the Moody Blues and attended by the Who's Pete Townshend and Cream's Ginger Baker, and alleged admissions of drug use by leading pop musicians. The first article targeted Donovan, who was raided and charged soon after the feature aired. The second instalment, published on 5 February, targeted the Rolling Stones.

A reporter who contributed to the story spent an evening at the London club Blaise's, where a member of the Rolling Stones allegedly took several Benzedrine tablets, displayed a piece of hashish, and invited his companions back to his flat for a "smoke". The article claimed this was Jagger, but it turned out to be a case of mistaken identity; the reporter had been eavesdropping on Brian Jones. Two days after the article was published, Jagger filed a writ for libel against the News of the World.

Jagger and Richards were later arrested on drug charges and given unusually harsh sentences. Jagger was sentenced to three months' imprisonment for possession of four over-the-counter pep pills he had bought in Italy, and Richards was sentenced to one year in prison for allowing cannabis to be smoked on his property. The traditionally conservative editor of The Times, William Rees-Mogg, wrote an article critical of the sentences. On appeal, Richards's sentence was overturned and Jagger's was amended to a conditional discharge, although he spent one night in London's Brixton Prison. The Rolling Stones continued to face legal battles for the next decade.

By the release of the Stones' album Beggars Banquet, Jones was contributing only sporadically to the band. Jagger said Jones was "not psychologically suited to this way of life". His drug use became a hindrance, and he could not obtain a US visa. Richards said that when Jagger, Watts, and he were at Jones's house in June 1969, Jones said he could not "go on the road again". Jones left the band, saying, "I've left, and if I want to I can come back". On 3 July 1969, Jones drowned in the swimming pool at his home, Cotchford Farm, in Hartfield, East Sussex. When asked whether he felt guilty about Jones's death, Jagger told Rolling Stone in 1995:

No, I don't really. I do feel that I behaved in a very childish way, but we were very young, and in some ways we picked on him. But, unfortunately, he made himself a target for it; he was very, very jealous, very difficult, very manipulative, and if you do that in this kind of a group of people you get back as good as you give, to be honest. I wasn't understanding enough about his drug addiction. No one seemed to know much about drug addiction. Things like LSD were all new. No one knew the harm. People thought cocaine was good for you.

On 5 July 1969, the Rolling Stones played a previously scheduled concert at Hyde Park, attended by 250,000 people, and dedicated it to Jones. It was their first concert with guitarist Mick Taylor, who replaced Jones. At the beginning of the concert, Jagger read an excerpt from Percy Bysshe Shelley's poem "Adonaïs", an elegy written on the death of John Keats, after which thousands of butterflies were released in Jones's memory. The band began the concert with "I'm Yours and I'm Hers", a song by Johnny Winter. During the concert, they played three new songs from two forthcoming albums, "Midnight Rambler" and "Love in Vain", from Let It Bleed, released in December 1969, and "Loving Cup", which appeared on Exile on Main St., released in May 1972. They also played "Honky Tonk Women", released as a single the previous day.

On 6 December 1969, the Stones performed at the Altamont Free Concert music festival, in which Meredith Hunter was stabbed to death by a member of the Hells Angels Motorcycle Club after drawing a revolver and approaching the stage, which was seen as a threat to the band. Accounts of Hunter's reason for drawing the revolver varied. According to The Guardian music editor Ben Beaumont-Thomas, Hunter's death and the overall mood of festival goers "has become symbolic for the corruption of 1960s hippy idealism". Jagger later told Robert Greenfield that he had been "scared shitless" that he "might be attacked on stage" by Hells Angels members who "felt they had been unfairly blamed for the disaster that left a Stones fan dead".

=== 1970s ===
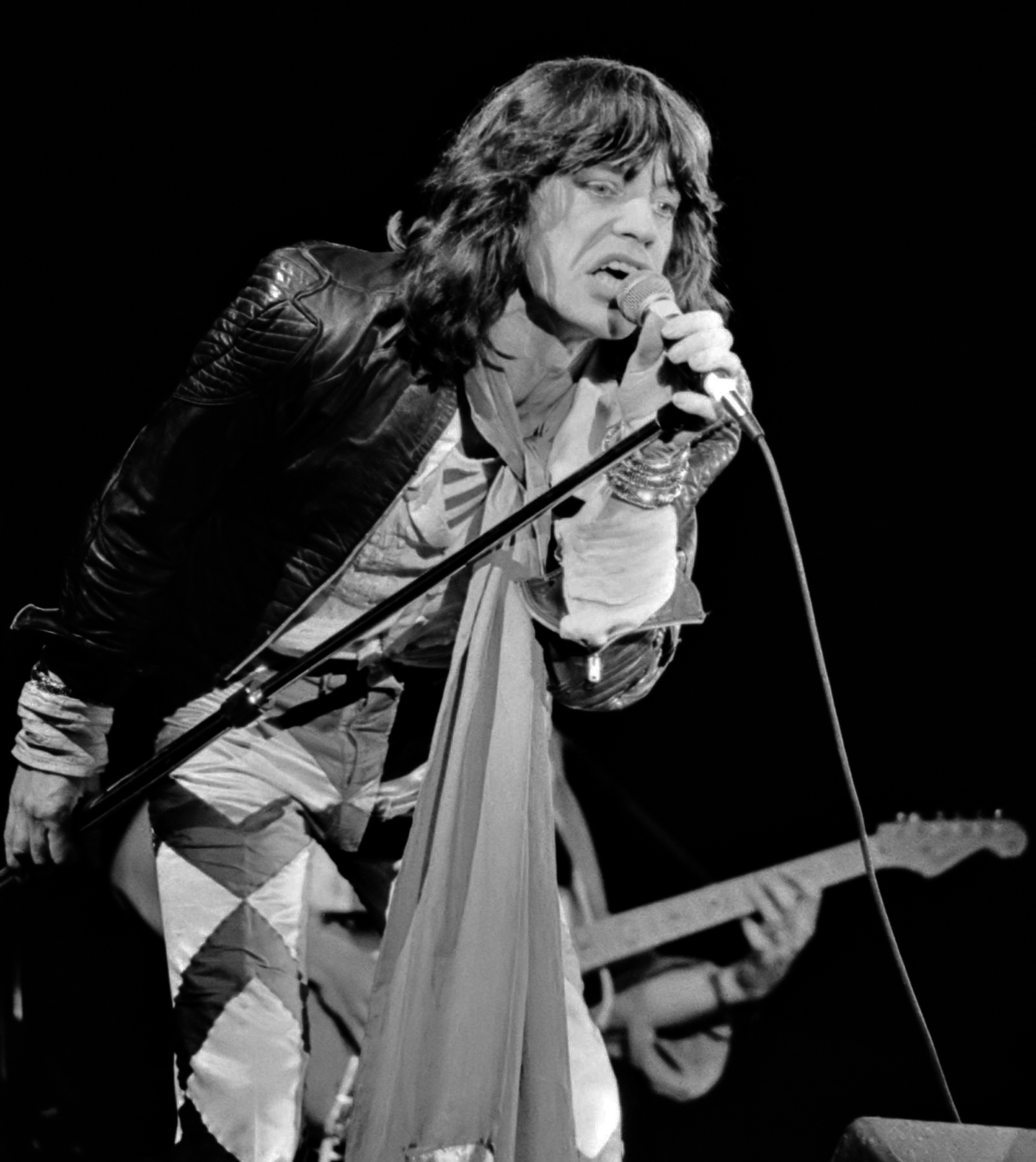
Jagger performing in Zuiderpark Stadion in The Hague, Netherlands, in May 1976

In 1970, Jagger bought Stargroves, a manor house and estate near East Woodhay in Hampshire. The Rolling Stones and several other bands recorded there using the Rolling Stones Mobile Studio. (Note: Led Zeppelin used the mobile studio to record material for the albums Physical Graffiti and Houses of the Holy. Dire Straits, Lou Reed, Bob Marley, Horslips, Fleetwood Mac, Bad Company, Status Quo, Iron Maiden, and Wishbone Ash, all recorded in the mobile studio. The Who recorded "Won't Get Fooled Again" in Stargroves. The Rolling Stones Mobile Studio was used to record the Deep Purple song "Smoke on the Water". The lyrics to the song, which Deep Purple had not intended to release, mention the mobile studio and were intended as a joke about it almost burning to the ground from a nearby fire. To rescue the mobile from the fire started by a flare gun, the Stones' crew had to smash a window and release the parking brake to roll it out of the way. Deep Purple referred to it as the "Rolling truck Stones thing" in the song. The Deep Purple lyrics, "We all came out to Montreux ... to make records with a mobile", reference the incident. The mobile is currently owned by the National Music Centre.) In 1970, Nicolas Roeg's film Performance, produced in 1968 and featuring Jagger, was released. In the film, Jagger plays Turner, a reclusive rock star. Richards's girlfriend Anita Pallenberg also appears in the film.

During a 1970 concert in Paris, Jagger called for the release of imprisoned French Maoists.

Jagger and the rest of the Rolling Stones moved to Southern France as tax exiles in early 1971 to avoid paying a 93 per cent supertax imposed by Harold Wilson's Labour government on the country's top earners. Jagger moved into a chateau near Biot in April 1971, days before the new tax year. After the band's acrimonious split with its second manager, Allen Klein, in 1971, and Richards's heroin addiction, Jagger took control of the band's business affairs, leading to feuds between him and Richards. Jagger has managed the group ever since, with Prince Rupert Loewenstein acting as business adviser and financial manager from 1968 to 2007.

Jagger and the rest of the band changed their look and style during the 1970s. In France, Jagger learned to play guitar and contributed guitar parts for songs on Sticky Fingers (1971) and the Stones' subsequent albums except Dirty Work. On the Stones' highly publicised 1972 US tour, Jagger wore glam-rock clothing and glitter makeup onstage. Their interest in the blues was manifest on the 1972 album Exile on Main St. Music critic Russell Hall called Jagger's emotional singing on the gospel-influenced "Let It Loose", which appears on Exile on Main St., Jagger's best vocal achievement.

In 1972, Jagger, Charlie Watts, Bill Wyman, Nicky Hopkins, and Ry Cooder released Jamming with Edward!, an album recorded during the band's Let It Bleed sessions. The album includes loose jams recorded while the rest of the Stones (reportedly) were waiting for Richards to return to the studio.

In November 1972, the band began recording sessions in Kingston, Jamaica, for the album Goats Head Soup, which was released in 1973 and reached No. 1 in both the UK and the US. The album includes the song "Angie", a global hit that was the first in a string of commercially successful singles to emerge from tepidly received albums. The sessions for Goats Head Soup produced unused material, including "Waiting on a Friend", a ballad that was not released until the Tattoo You LP nine years later.

Another legal battle over drugs, dating to their stay in France, interrupted the making of Goats Head Soup. Authorities issued a warrant for Richards's arrest, and the other band members returned briefly to France for questioning related to the incident. Along with Jagger's 1967 and 1970 convictions on drug charges, this complicated the band's plans for its Pacific tour in early 1973. The band was denied permission to play in Japan and nearly banned from playing in Australia. A European tour followed in September and October 1973, which bypassed France after Richards's arrest in England on drug charges.

The 1974 album It's Only Rock 'n Roll was recorded in the Musicland Studios in Munich; it reached No. 2 in the UK and No. 1 in the US. Jagger and Richards produced the album credited as "the Glimmer Twins". The album and the single of the same name were both hits.

After Mick Taylor left the band in December 1974, the Stones needed a new guitarist. The Munich recording sessions for the next album, Black and Blue (1976) (No. 2 in the UK, No. 1 in the US), gave guitarists hoping to join the band the chance to try out. Several auditioned, some without knowing they were auditioning. Ronnie Wood, then the guitarist of the band Faces was selected, and joined the band in 1975. Wood has sometimes functioned as a mediator in the group, especially between Jagger and Richards. His first full-length LP with the band was Some Girls (1978), on which they ventured into disco and punk, a move primarily led by Jagger.

=== 1980s ===
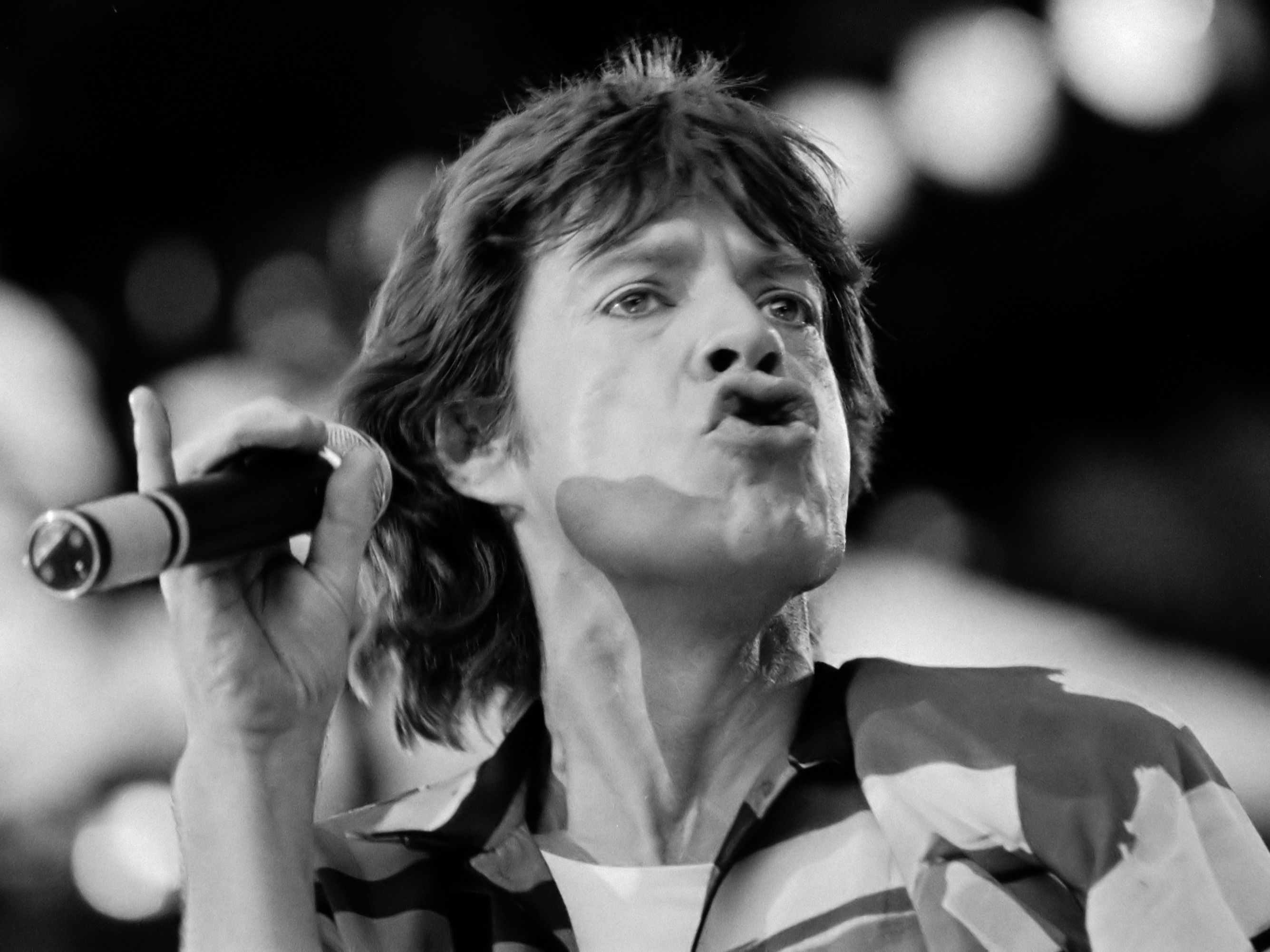
Jagger performing in Rotterdam, Netherlands, in June 1982

Following the success of Some Girls, the band released the album Emotional Rescue in mid-1980. During recording sessions for the album, a rift between Jagger and Richards began developing. Richards wanted to tour in the summer or autumn of 1980 to promote Emotional Rescue, but Jagger declined. Emotional Rescue hit the top of the charts on both sides of the Atlantic and the title track reached No. 3 in the US.

In early 1981, the Rolling Stones reconvened and began touring the US that year, leaving little time to write and record a new album. The band's album Tattoo You, released in 1981, featured several outtakes, including "Start Me Up", the album's lead single that reached No. 2 in the US and ranked No. 22 on Billboard's Hot 100 year-end chart. Two songs, "Waiting on a Friend" (US No. 13), and "Tops", feature Mick Taylor's unused rhythm guitar tracks. Jazz saxophonist Sonny Rollins plays on three Tattoo You songs, "Slave", "Neighbours", and "Waiting on a Friend". The album reached No. 2 in the UK and No. 1 in the US.

While continuing to tour and release albums with the Rolling Stones, Jagger began a solo career. According to a February 1985 article in Rolling Stone, Jagger did so to "establish an artistic identity for himself apart from the Rolling Stones" which was described as "his boldest attempt yet". Jagger started writing and recording material for his first solo album She's the Boss. Released on 19 February 1985, the album, produced by Nile Rodgers and Bill Laswell, features Herbie Hancock, Jeff Beck, Jan Hammer, Pete Townshend and the Compass Point All Stars. It sold well, and the single "Just Another Night" was a Top Ten hit. During this period, he collaborated with the Jacksons on the song "State of Shock", sharing lead vocals with Michael Jackson.

In 1985, Jagger performed without the Rolling Stones at Live Aid, a multi-venue charity concert in 1985. Jagger performed at Philadelphia's JFK Stadium, where he also performed a duet of "It's Only Rock and Roll" with Tina Turner, highlighted by Jagger tearing away Turner's skirt, and a cover of "Dancing in the Street" with David Bowie, who was performing at Wembley Stadium in London. The video was shown simultaneously on the screens of both Wembley and JFK Stadiums. The song reached No. 1 in the UK the same year.

In February 1986, Wyman alleged to author Bill German that Jagger tried several times to throw him out of the band. But German chose not to report this in his Beggars Banquet newsletter at that time given the poor state of relations within the band.

Richards ended his heroin use and became more present in decision-making, but Jagger was not accustomed to Richards's presence and did not like his authority over the band diminished. This led to a feud between Jagger and Richards that has been referred to as "World War III" with concern at the time that Jagger touring without the Stones could prove a "death sentence" for the band. When the Stones released Dirty Work in March 1986, Jagger's relations with Richards had reached an all-time low, leading Jagger to refuse to tour with the band to support the new album. Jagger responded, saying:

I think that one ought to be allowed to have one's artistic side apart from just being in the Rolling Stones. I love the Rolling Stones—I think it's wonderful, I think it's done a lot of wonderful things for music. But, you know, it cannot be, at my age and after spending all these years, the only thing in my life.

Jagger released his second solo album, Primitive Cool, in 1987. Though it failed to match the commercial success of his debut solo album, it was critically well received. Richards released his first solo album, Talk is Cheap, shortly afterwards. Many felt the respective solo efforts marked the end of the Rolling Stones as a band. In 1988, Jagger produced the songs "Glamour Boys" and "Which Way to America" on Living Colour's album Vivid. Between 15 and 28 March, he also performed a solo concert tour in Japan, playing in Tokyo, Nagoya, and Osaka.

Jagger and Richards reunited in the Barbados in 1988 and produced dozens of new songs. Richards recalls:

We just started in. And within two days, we realized we had five or six songs happening. I did have to take Mick to a few discos—which are not my favourite places in the world—because Mick likes to go out and dance at night. So I did that. That was my sacrifice. I humoured him. And that's when I knew we could work together.

Ron Wood believes the modest sales of Jagger's Primitive Cool "surprised" Jagger and made him "realize the strength of the band". Richards recalled, "We've been stuffed together for years and one of the consequences of the break was making us realize we were stuck together whether we liked it or not. Jagger said, "Because we've been doing it for so long, we don't really have to discuss it. When we come up with a lick or a riff or a chorus, we already know if it's right or if it's wrong." On 29 August 1989, the band released its 19th UK and 21st US album, Steel Wheels.

=== 1990s ===
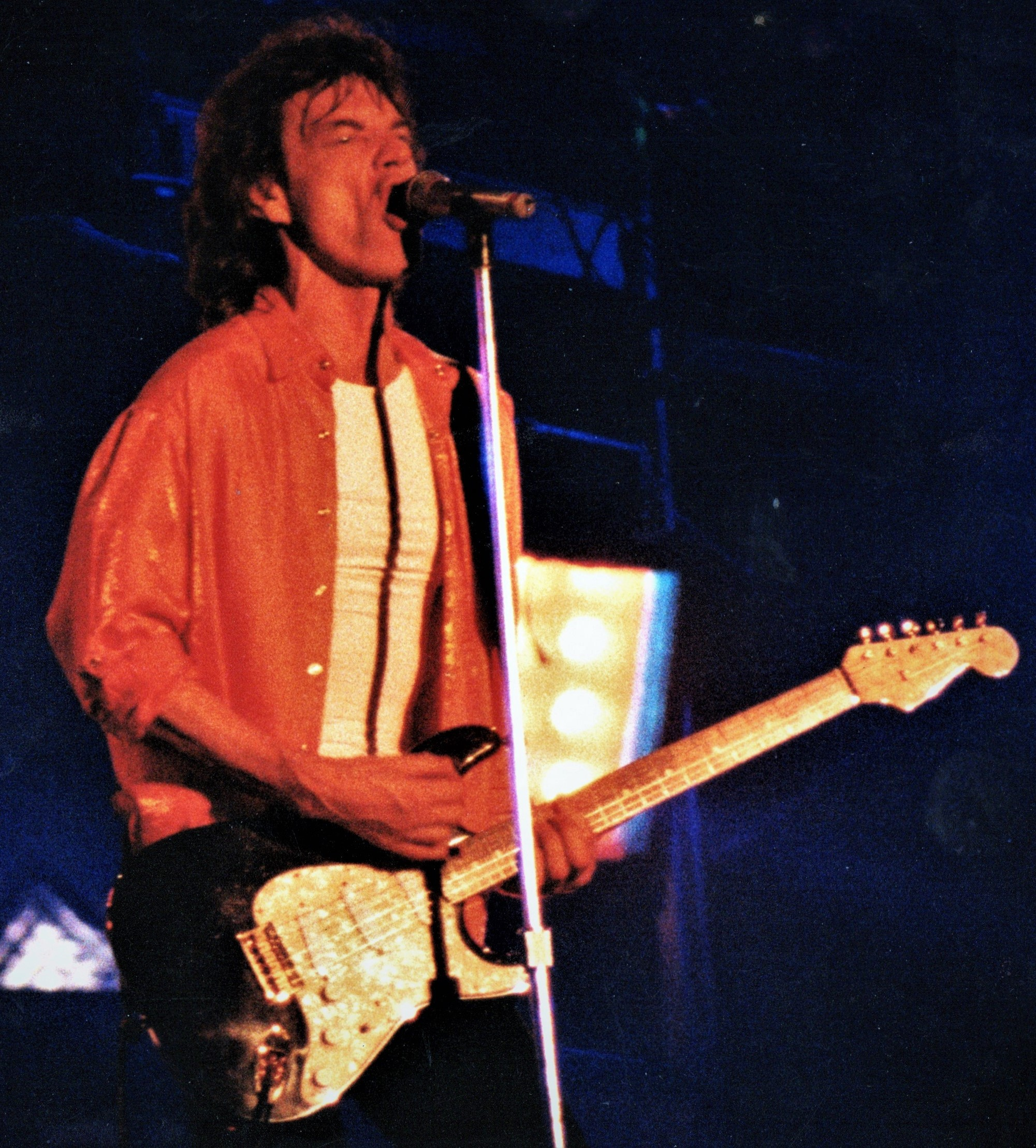
Jagger performing in Santiago, Chile, on the Rolling Stones' Voodoo Lounge Tour in February 1995

The 1989–1990 Steel Wheels/Urban Jungle Tour was the band's first world tour in seven years and their biggest stage production to date. Opening acts included Living Colour and Guns N' Roses. Recordings from the tour were released in a 1991 concert album, Flashpoint, which reached No. 6 in the UK and No. 16 in the US, and the concert film Live at the Max, released in 1991. The tour was Bill Wyman's last. After years of deliberation, Wyman chose to leave the band, although his departure was not made official until January 1993.

Following the success of Steel Wheels, and the end of Jagger and Richards's well-publicised feud, Jagger attempted to reestablish himself as a solo artist. He acquired Rick Rubin as co-producer in January 1992 for his third solo album, Wandering Spirit. Sessions for the album began that month in Los Angeles and ended nine months later, in September 1992. Richards recorded his second solo studio album, Main Offender, at the same time.

On Wandering Spirit, Jagger used Lenny Kravitz as a vocalist on his cover of Bill Withers's "Use Me" and bassist Flea from Red Hot Chili Peppers on three separate tracks. Jagger signed with Atlantic Records, which had signed the Stones in the 1970s, to distribute the solo album. Wandering Spirit, released in February 1993, and The Very Best of Mick Jagger, a compilation album containing no new material, were both released by Atlantic Records. Wandering Spirit was commercially successful, reaching No. 12 in the UK and No. 11 in the US.

In 1993, the Stones were ready to start recording their next studio album, and Charlie Watts recruited bassist Darryl Jones, a former sideman of Miles Davis and Sting, as Wyman's replacement for the recording of Voodoo Lounge, released in 1994. Jones continued to perform with the band as the band's touring and session bassist. The album was well received critically and proved commercially successful, going double platinum in the US. Reviews of the Voodoo Lounge noted and credited the album's "traditionalist" sounds to the Rolling Stones' new producer Don Was. Voodoo Lounge won the Grammy Award for Best Rock Album at the 1995 Grammy Awards. It reached No. 1 in the UK and No. 2 in the US.

The Voodoo Lounge Tour to support Voodoo Lounge lasted into 1996, grossing $320 million and becoming the world's highest-grossing tour ever at the time. On 8 September 1994, the Stones performed "Love Is Strong", a new song, and "Start Me Up" at the 1994 MTV Video Music Awards at Radio City Music Hall in New York City. The band was awarded the Lifetime Achievement Award at the 1994 MTV ceremony.

The Rolling Stones ended the 1990s with the album Bridges to Babylon, released in 1997 to mixed reviews. It reached No. 6 in the UK and No. 3 in the US. The music video for the single "Anybody Seen My Baby?" featuring Angelina Jolie was played in steady rotation on both MTV and VH1. Sales were roughly equal to those of previous records (about 1.2 million copies sold in the US). The subsequent Bridges to Babylon Tour, which crossed Europe, North America, and other destinations, proved the band remained a strong live music attraction. Another live album, No Security, was released from the tour. No Security included all new songs, except "Live With Me" and "The Last Time", which had been previously unreleased on live albums. The album reached No. 67 in the UK and No. 34 in the US. In 1999, the Rolling Stones staged the No Security Tour in the US and continued the Bridges to Babylon tour in Europe.

=== 2000s ===
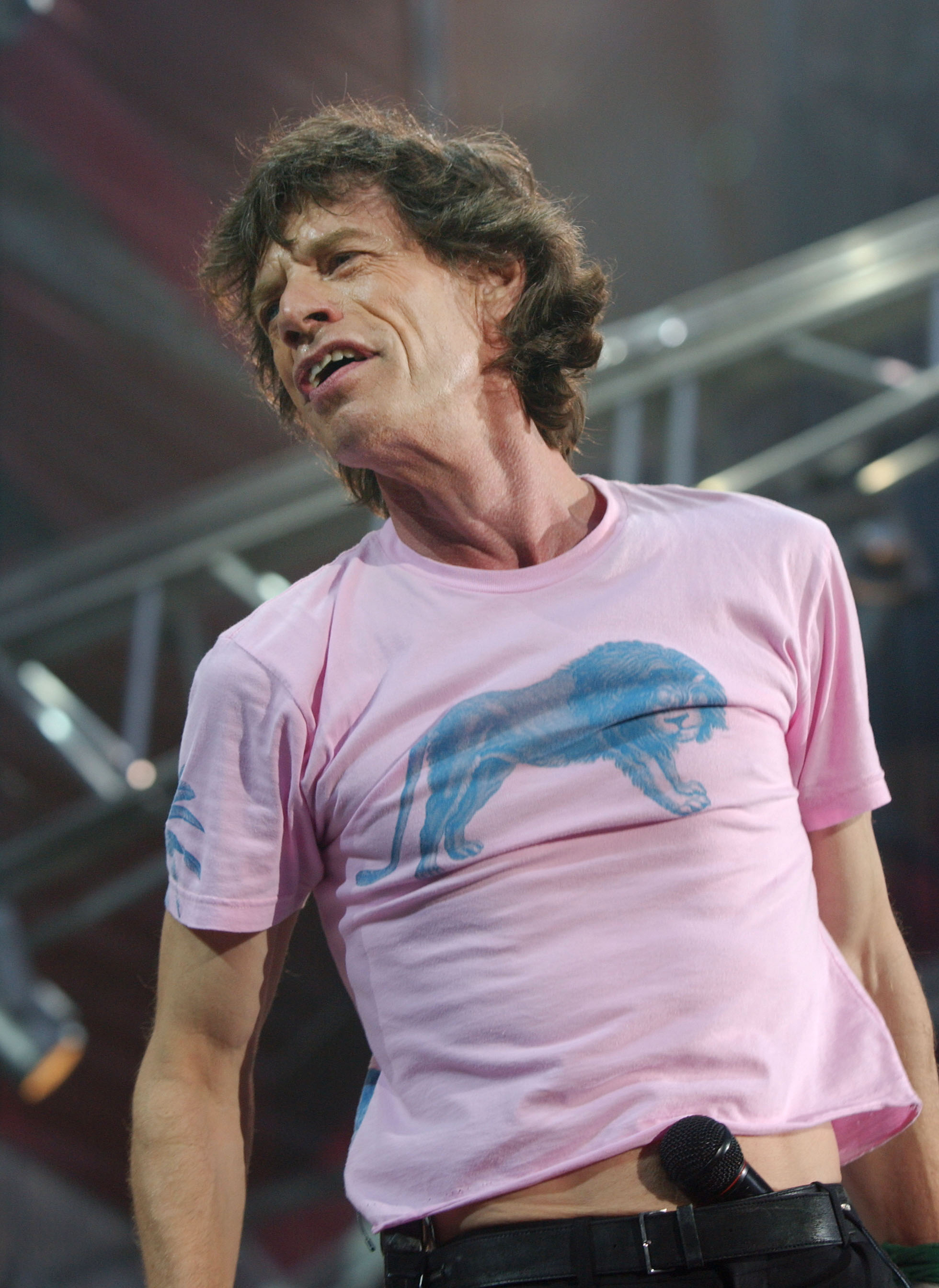
Jagger performing at San Siro in Milan in June 2003

In 2001, Jagger released his fourth solo album, Goddess in the Doorway, spawning the single "Visions of Paradise", which reached No. 44 in the UK. Following the 11 September attacks, Jagger joined Richards in the Concert for New York City, a benefit concert in response to the terrorist attack, to sing "Salt of the Earth" and "Miss You".

From 1989 to 2001, according to Fortune, the Stones generated more than US$1.5 billion in total gross revenue, surpassing the revenue of U2, Bruce Springsteen, and Michael Jackson. Jagger celebrated the Rolling Stones' 40th anniversary by touring with the band on the year-long Licks Tour, supporting the band's commercially successful career retrospective, Forty Licks, a double album. Along with Eurythmics member and record producer David A. Stewart, Jagger wrote and performed the soundtrack to the 2004 romantic comedy Alfie, which included the Golden Globe Award for Best Original Song-winning single "Old Habits Die Hard". In 2007, the band grossed US$437 million on A Bigger Bang Tour, earning the band an entry in the 2007 edition of Guinness World Records for the most lucrative music tour ever. Asked if the band would retire after the tour, Jagger said, "I'm sure the Rolling Stones will do more things and more records and more tours. We've got no plans to stop any of that really."

Two years later, in October 2009, Jagger joined U2 to perform "Gimme Shelter" with Fergie and will.i.am, and "Stuck in a Moment You Can't Get Out Of" with U2 at the 25th Anniversary Rock & Roll Hall of Fame Concert.

=== 2010s ===
On 20 May 2011, Jagger announced the formation of a new supergroup, SuperHeavy, including Dave Stewart, Joss Stone, Damian Marley, and A. R. Rahman. The group started with a phone call Jagger received from Stewart. Stewart had heard three sound systems playing different music at the same time in his home in St Ann's Bay, Jamaica. This gave him the idea of creating a group with Jagger, fusing the musical styles of several artists. After multiple phone calls and deliberation, the other members of the group were decided upon. SuperHeavy released one album and two singles in 2011, reportedly recording 29 songs in ten days. Jagger is featured on will.i.am's 2011 single "T.H.E. (The Hardest Ever)" along with Jennifer Lopez, officially released to iTunes on 4 February 2012.

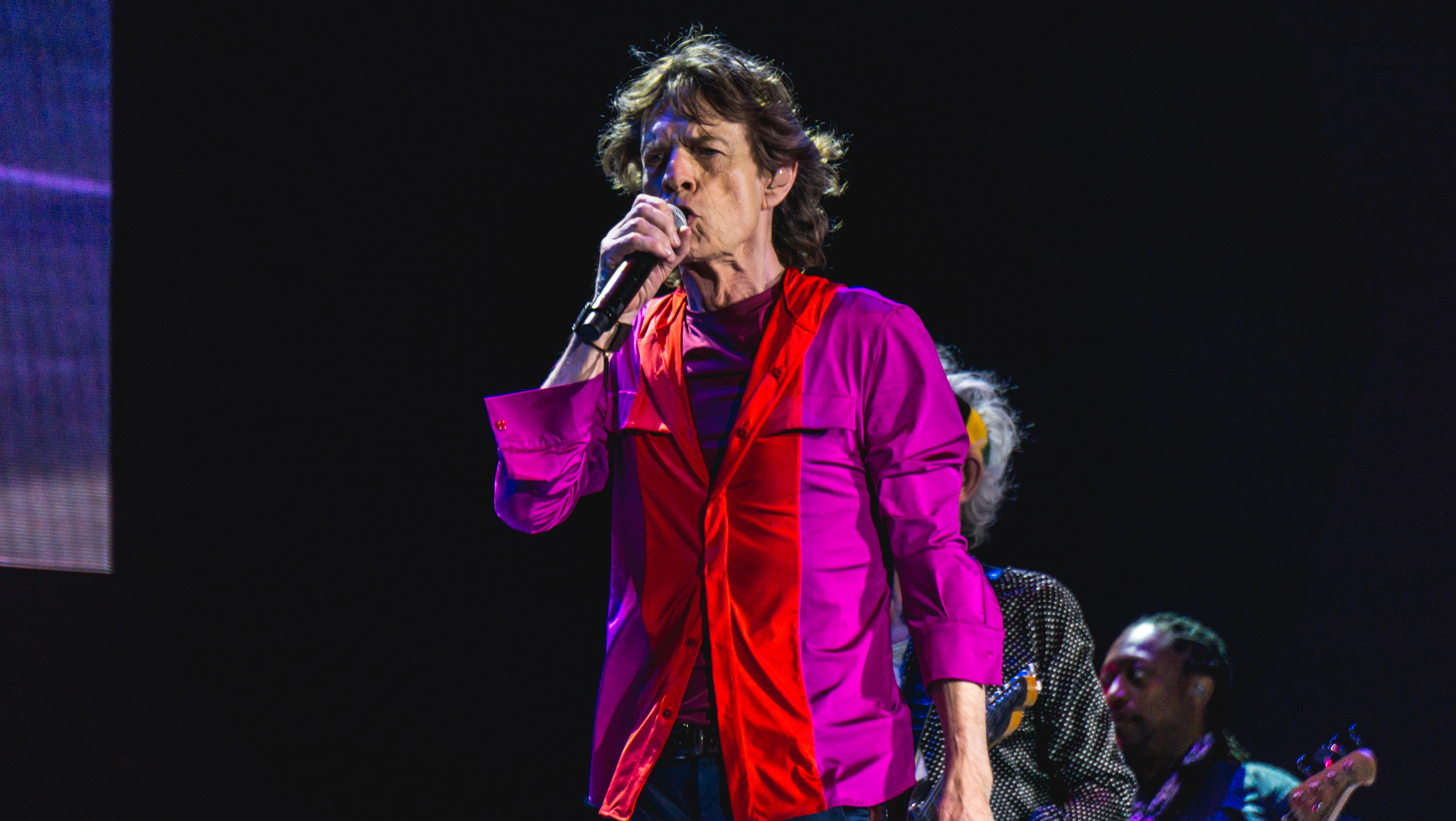
Jagger performing with the Stones at Desert Trip in October 2016

On 21 February 2012, Jagger, B. B. King, Buddy Guy and Jeff Beck, and a blues ensemble, performed at the White House concert series before President Barack Obama. When Jagger held out a mic to him, Obama twice sang the line "Come on, baby don't you want to go" of the blues cover "Sweet Home Chicago", the blues anthem of Obama's hometown. Jagger hosted the season finale of Saturday Night Live on 19 and 20 May 2012, doing several comic skits and playing some Rolling Stones' hits with Arcade Fire, Foo Fighters and Jeff Beck.

Jagger performed in 12-12-12: The Concert for Sandy Relief with the Rolling Stones on 12 December 2012. The Stones played the Glastonbury festival in 2013, headlining on Saturday, 29 June. This was followed by two concerts in London's Hyde Park as part of their 50th anniversary celebrations, their first there since their famous 1969 performance. In 2013, Jagger teamed up with his brother Chris Jagger for two new duets on his album Concertina Jack, released to mark the 40th anniversary of his debut album. On 7 October 2016, the Stones headlined the first night of the three-day music festival Desert Trip and covered the Beatles' 1969 single "Come Together"; Paul McCartney performed the next night. In July 2017, Jagger released the double A-sided single "Gotta Get a Grip" / "England Lost". They were released as a response to the "anxiety, unknowability of the changing political situation" in a post-Brexit UK, according to Jagger. Accompanying music videos were released for both songs.

In March 2019, a Rolling Stones tour of the US and Canada from April to June had to be postponed as Jagger needed a transcatheter aortic valve replacement. On 4 April 2019, it was announced that Jagger had successfully undergone the procedure at NewYork–Presbyterian Hospital, and was in great health. After a six-week delay while Jagger recovered, the No Filter Tour resumed with two performances at Chicago's Soldier Field.

=== 2020s ===
The band's 1973 album Goats Head Soup was reissued in September 2020 and featured previously unreleased outtakes, such as "Scarlet", featuring Jimmy Page. The album topped the UK Albums Chart as the Rolling Stones became the first band to top the chart across six different decades.

The Rolling Stones—featuring Jagger, Richards, Watts and Wood at their homes—were one of the headline acts on Global Citizen's One World: Together at Home on-line and on-screen concert on 18 April 2020, a global event featuring dozens of artists and comedians to support frontline healthcare workers and the World Health Organization during the COVID-19 pandemic. Five days later, they released "Living in a Ghost Town", a new Rolling Stones' single recorded in London and Los Angeles in 2019 and finished in isolation (part of the new material that the band were recording in the studio before the COVID-19 lockdown), a song that the band "thought would resonate through the times we're living in" and their first release of original material since 2012. The song reached No. 1 on the German Singles Chart, the first time the Stones had reached the top spot in 52 years, and making them the oldest artists ever to do so.

In August 2021, it was announced that Charlie Watts would undergo an unspecified medical procedure and would not perform on the remainder of the No Filter tour; the longtime Stones associate Steve Jordan filled in as drummer. Watts died at a London hospital on 24 August 2021, at the age of 80, with his family around him. Jagger, Richards and Wood paid tribute to him, along with former bandmate Wyman. It was discussed whether the band would continue, and they opted to carry on as it was what "Charlie wanted us to do". During their first show after Watts's death, Jagger told the crowd:

It's a bit of a poignant night for us. Because this is our first tour in 59 years that we've done without our lovely Charlie Watts. We all miss Charlie so much. We miss him as a band. We miss him as friends, on and off the stage. We've got so many memories of Charlie. I'm sure some of you that have seen us before have got memories of Charlie as well. And I hope you'll remember him like we do. So we'd like to dedicate this show to Charlie.

In a May 2022 interview, Jagger stated "I don't really expect him to be there any more if I turn round during a show. But I do think about him. Not only during rehearsals or on stage, but in other ways too." On the one-year anniversary of Watts's death, Jagger shared what Rolling Stone described as a "moving tribute" on social media, which included a voiceover by Jagger backed with "Till the Next Goodbye". That same year, Jagger co-wrote and performed "Strange Game" for the television series Slow Horses after being emailed "out of the blue" by composer Daniel Pemberton, whom he did not know; it was subsequently nominated for an Emmy award. That June, two shows scheduled in the Stones' Sixty tour were postponed after Jagger contracted COVID-19. The tour resumed following Jagger's recovery in late June. Jagger launched his own line of harmonicas the following January in collaboration with whynow Music and Lee Oskar, expressing a desire to encourage younger musicians to take up the instrument.

== Relationship with Keith Richards ==
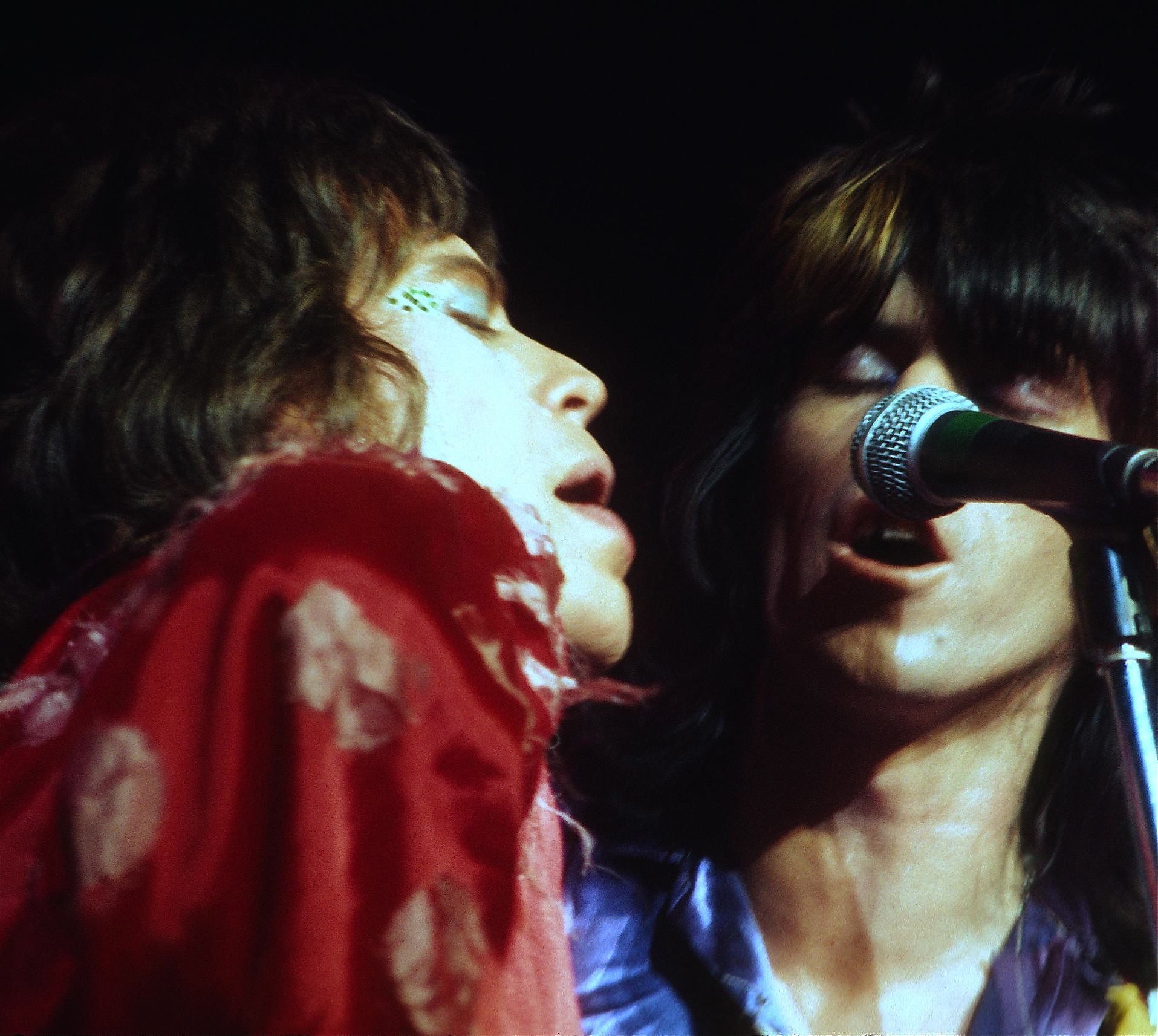
Jagger and Richards performing at Winterland Ballroom in San Francisco during the Rolling Stones' 1972 US tour

Jagger's songwriting partnership with Richards is one of the most successful in history. His relationship with Richards is frequently described as "love/hate" by the media. Richards said in a 1998 interview: "I think of our differences as a family squabble. If I shout and scream at him, it's because no one else has the guts to do it or else they're paid not to do it. At the same time I'd hope Mick realises that I'm a friend who is just trying to bring him into line and do what needs to be done."

Dirty Work (a UK and US No. 4) was released in March 1986 to mixed reviews, despite the US top-five hit "Harlem Shuffle". With relations between Richards and Jagger at a low, Jagger refused to tour to promote the album, and instead undertook his own solo tour, which included Rolling Stones' songs. Richards has referred to this period in his relations with Jagger as "World War III". As a result of the animosity within the band at this time, they almost broke up.

Jagger's solo albums, She's the Boss (UK No. 6; US No. 13) (1985) and Primitive Cool (UK No. 26; US No. 41) (1987), met with moderate success and, in 1988, with the Rolling Stones mostly inactive, Richards released his first solo album, Talk Is Cheap (UK No. 37; US No. 24). It was well received by fans and critics, going gold in the US. The following year 25×5: the Continuing Adventures of the Rolling Stones, a documentary spanning the career of the band, was released for their 25th anniversary.

Richards's autobiography, Life, was published on 26 October 2010. According to a 15 October 2010 article, Richards described Jagger as "unbearable", noting that their relationship had been strained "for decades". By 2015, Richards's opinion had softened. While saying Jagger could come off as a "snob", he added "I still love him dearly ... your friends don't have to be perfect."

== Acting and film production ==
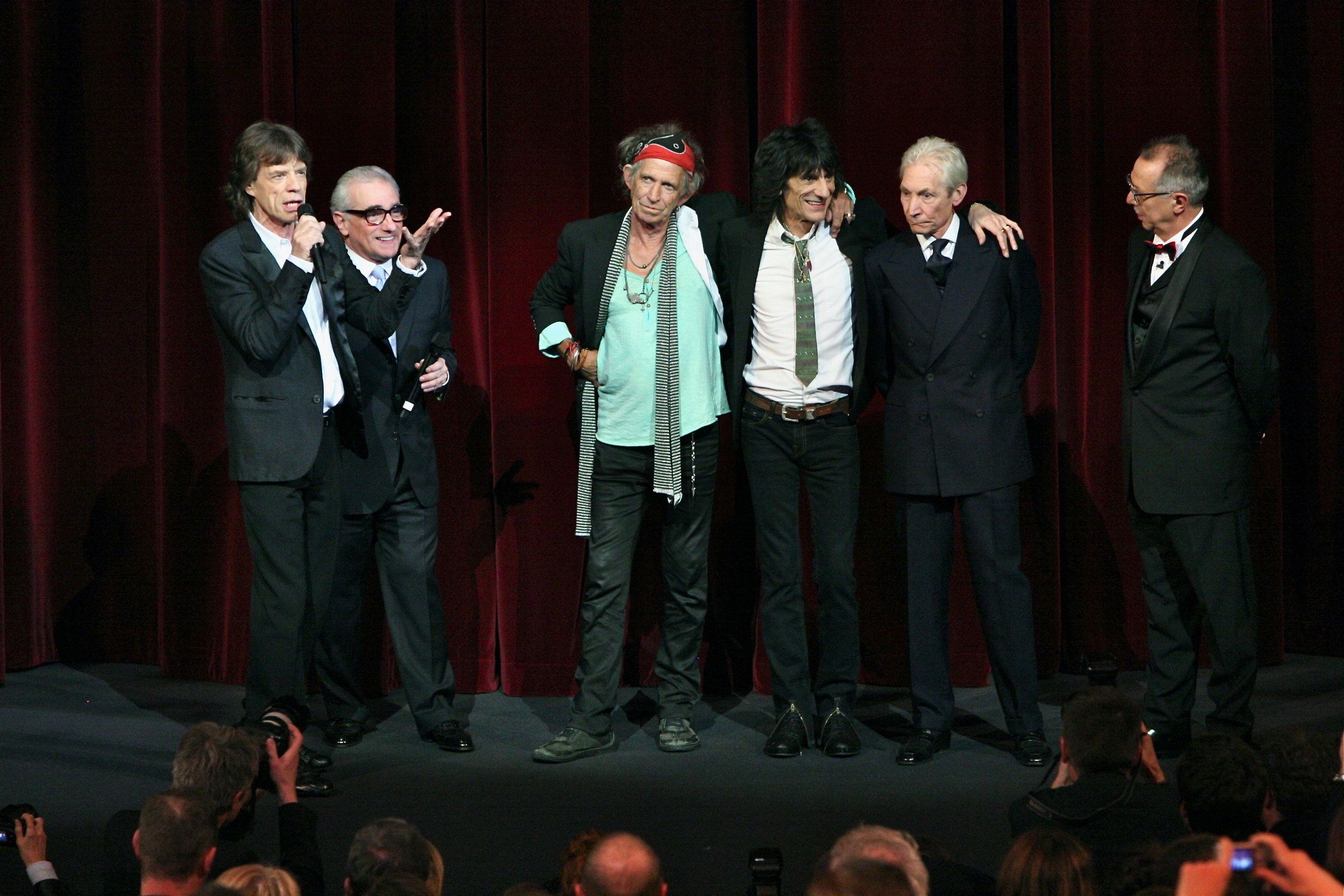
Left to right: Jagger, Martin Scorsese, Richards, Wood, and Watts, at the premiere of Shine a Light in Berlin, Germany, in February 2008

Jagger has had an intermittent acting career. His most significant role was in Donald Cammell and Nicolas Roeg's Performance (1968), and as Australian bushranger Ned Kelly in the film of the same name (1970). He composed an improvised soundtrack for Kenneth Anger's film Invocation of My Demon Brother on the Moog synthesiser in 1969.

Jagger auditioned for the role of Dr. Frank N. Furter in the 1975 film adaptation of The Rocky Horror Show, a role that was eventually played by Tim Curry, the original performer from its theatrical run in London's West End. Director Alejandro Jodorowsky approached him in the same year to play the role of Feyd-Rautha in his proposed adaptation of Frank Herbert's Dune, but the movie never made it to the screen. Jagger appeared as himself in the Rutles' film All You Need Is Cash (1978) and was cast as Wilbur, a main character in Werner Herzog's Fitzcarraldo, in the late 1970s. The illness of principal actor Jason Robards (later replaced by Klaus Kinski), and a delay in the film's notoriously difficult production, resulted in him being unable to continue because of schedule conflicts with a Stones' tour; some footage of Jagger's work is shown in the documentaries Burden of Dreams and My Best Fiend. Jagger starred in and co-wrote with Julien Temple Running Out of Luck (1985). Jagger developed a reputation for playing the heavy later in his acting career in films including Freejack (1992), Bent (1997), and The Man From Elysian Fields (2002).

In 1991, Jagger founded Jagged Films with Victoria Pearman and, in 1995, founded the film production company Lip Service with Steve Tisch. Jagged Films' first release was the World War II drama Enigma (2001), starring Kate Winslet as one of Bletchley Park's Enigma codebreakers. That same year, Jagged Films produced a documentary about Jagger entitled Being Mick. The programme, which first aired in the US on ABC on 22 November, coincided with the release of his fourth solo album, Goddess in the Doorway. In 2008 the company began work on The Women, an adaptation of the George Cukor's film of the same name, directed by Diane English.

As a member of the Rolling Stones, Jagger appears in several documentaries. These include Gimme Shelter, filmed during the band's 1969 tour of the US, and Sympathy for the Devil (1968) directed by French New Wave director Jean-Luc Godard. Martin Scorsese worked with Jagger on Shine a Light, a documentary film featuring the band with footage from the A Bigger Bang Tour during two nights of performances at New York's Beacon Theatre. It screened in Berlin in February 2008. McCarthy predicted the film would fare better once released to video than in its limited theatrical runs.

Jagger was a co-producer of, and guest-starred in, the first episode of the short-lived American comedy television series The Knights of Prosperity. He also co-produced the James Brown biopic Get On Up (2014). Alongside Martin Scorsese, Rich Cohen and Terence Winter, Jagger co-created and executive produced the period drama series Vinyl (2016), which starred Bobby Cannavale and aired for one season on HBO before its cancellation. Jagger portrays an English art dealer-collector and patron in Giuseppe Capotondi's thriller The Burnt Orange Heresy (2020).

Jagger is co-producer of the upcoming film Miles & Juliette about Miles Davis and Juliette Gréco when they met in Paris in 1949.

== Personal life ==
=== Family and relationships ===
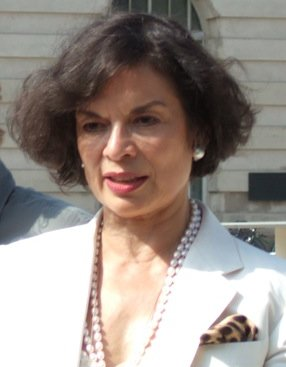
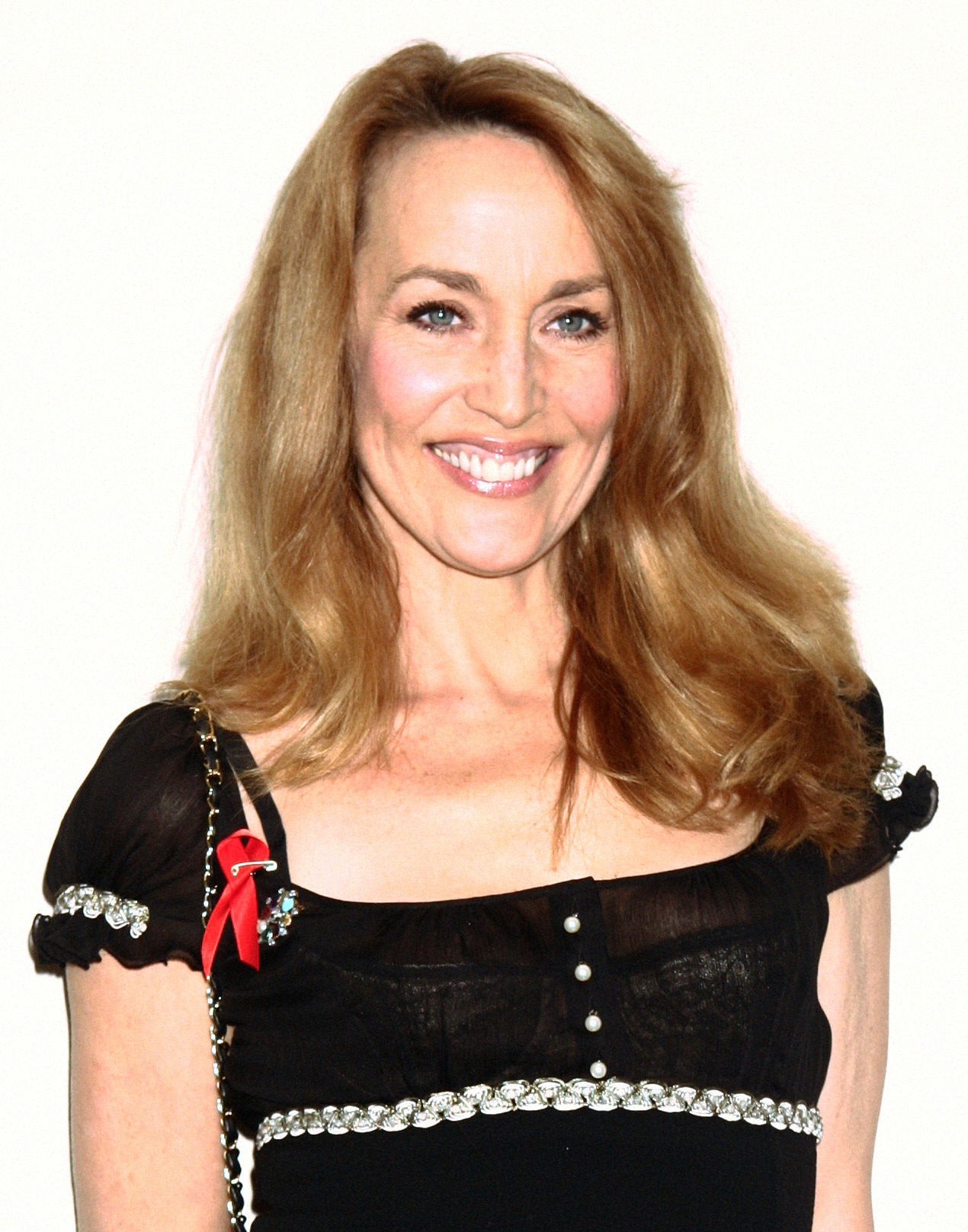
Bianca Pérez-Mora Macias (left), Jagger's wife from 1971 to 1978, and model Jerry Hall (right), Jagger's partner from 1977 to 1999; they were unofficially married from 1990 to 1999

Jagger has been married and divorced once, and has had other relationships, resulting in eight children with five women. As of 2024, he also has seven grandchildren and three great-grandchildren.

Jagger's first serious girlfriend was Cleo Sylvestre, whom he began to date around 1961. Jagger dated Chrissie Shrimpton between 1963 and 1966. From 1966 to 1970, he had a relationship with Marianne Faithfull, the English singer-songwriter/actress with whom he wrote "Sister Morphine", a song on Sticky Fingers. They broke up in May 1970 after she suffered a miscarriage. They had named the girl Corrina. Faithfull has stated that both she and Jagger were devastated at the loss, and that they both coped in different ways, her with drugs and Jagger by burying himself in work. She also stated that she knew that he longed to be a father and that the event marked the beginning of the end of their relationship.

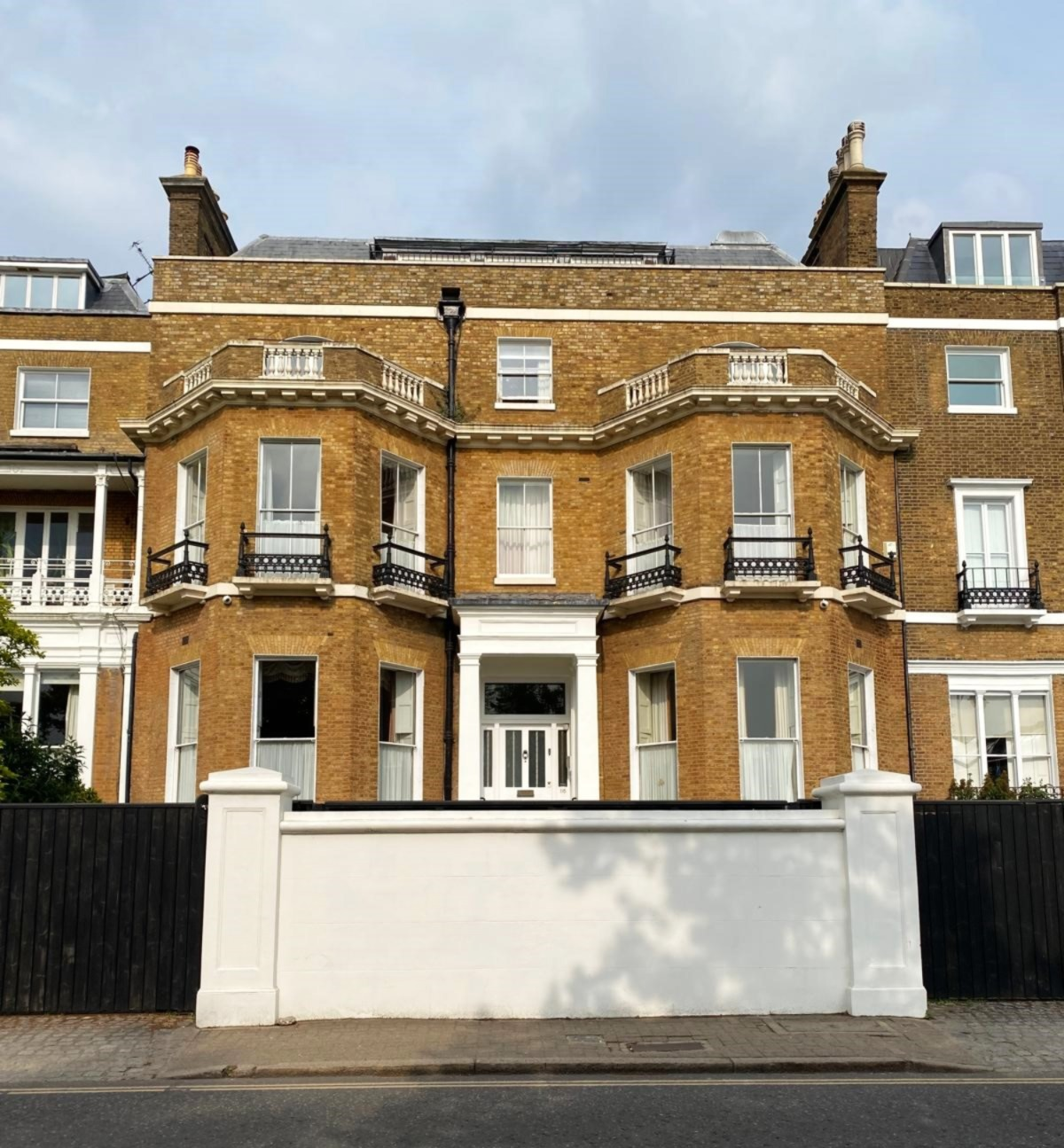
Mick Jagger's House in Richmond, UK

Jagger met the American singer Marsha Hunt in 1969 and, though she was married, the pair began a relationship. When it ended in June 1970, Hunt was pregnant with Jagger's first child, Karis Hunt Jagger, who was born on 4 November 1970. Hunt is said to be the inspiration for the song "Brown Sugar", also from Sticky Fingers.

In 1970, he met Nicaraguan-born Bianca Pérez-Mora Macias. They married on 12 May 1971 in a Catholic ceremony in Saint-Tropez, France. Their daughter, Jade Sheena Jezebel Jagger, was born on 21 October 1971. They separated in 1977, and in May 1978 she filed for divorce on the grounds of his adultery.

In late 1977, Jagger began dating American model Jerry Hall. They had an unofficial private marriage ceremony in Bali, Indonesia, on 21 November 1990, and lived at Downe House in Richmond, London. The couple had four children: Elizabeth 'Lizzie' Scarlett Jagger (born 2 March 1984), James Leroy Augustin Jagger (born in 1985), Georgia May Ayeesha Jagger (born 12 January 1992), and Gabriel Luke Beauregard Jagger (born in 1997).

During his relationship with Hall, Jagger had an affair from 1991 to 1994 with Italian singer-model Carla Bruni, who later became the First Lady of France when she married then-President of France Nicolas Sarkozy in 2008. Jagger's relationship with Hall ended after she discovered that he had an affair with Brazilian model Luciana Gimenez, who gave birth to Jagger's seventh child, Lucas Maurice Morad Jagger, in May 1999. Jagger's unofficial marriage to Hall was declared invalid, unlawful, and null and void by the High Court of England and Wales in London in 1999. From 2000 to 2001 Jagger was in a relationship with the English model Sophie Dahl.

Jagger was in a relationship with fashion designer L'Wren Scott from 2001 until her death in 2014. Scott died by suicide in March 2014. She left her entire estate, estimated at US$9 million, to him. Jagger set up the L'Wren Scott scholarship at London's Central Saint Martins College.

Since Scott died in 2014, Jagger has been in a relationship with American ballet dancer Melanie Hamrick. Jagger was 73 when Hamrick gave birth to their son Deveraux Octavian Basil Jagger in 2016.

Jagger's father, Basil "Joe" Jagger, died of pneumonia on 11 November 2006 at age 93. Although the Rolling Stones were on the A Bigger Bang tour, Jagger flew to Britain to see his father before returning the same day to Las Vegas, where he was to perform that night, after being informed his father's condition was improving. The show went ahead as scheduled, despite Jagger learning of his father's death that afternoon. Jagger's friends said that the show going on was "what Joe would have wanted". Jagger called his father the "greatest influence" in his life.

=== Interests and philanthropy ===
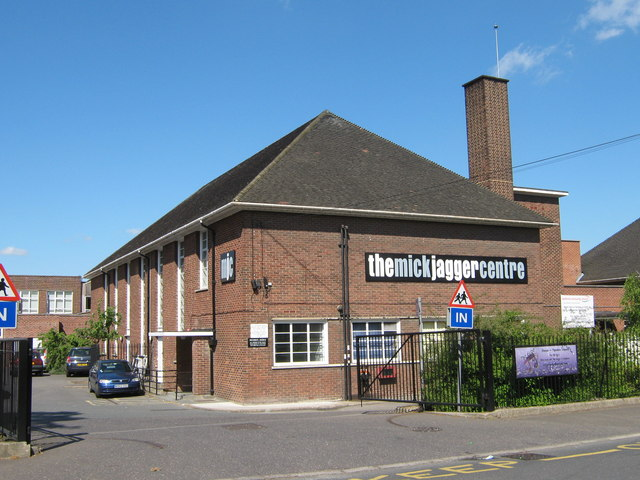
The Mick Jagger Centre in Dartford in April 2009

Jagger is a supporter of music in schools, a patron of the Mick Jagger Centre in Dartford, and sponsors music through his Red Rooster Programme in its local schools. The Red Rooster name is taken from the title of one of the Rolling Stones' earliest singles.

An avid cricket fan, Jagger founded Jagged Internetworks to cover the sport, beginning with the 1997–98 Singer Akai Champions Trophy. He keenly follows the England national football team, and has regularly attended FIFA World Cup games. In 2021, Fox Business quoted an estimate that his net worth was US$500 million and called him "one of music's more identifiable figures". Earlier that same year, The Times had quoted it at approximately £310 million. In 2025, the Independent estimated his net worth at £440 million.

== Honours ==
Jagger was honoured with a knighthood for services to popular music in the Queen's 2002 Birthday Honours, and on 12 December 2003 he received the accolade from The Prince of Wales. Jagger's father and daughters Karis and Elizabeth were present. Jagger stated that although the award did not have significant meaning for him, he was "touched" by the significance that it held for his father, saying that his father "was very proud". In 1989, Jagger was inducted into the American Rock and Roll Hall of Fame alongside the other Stones, including Mick Taylor and Ronnie Wood as well as Brian Jones and Ian Stewart (posthumously). In November 2004, the Rolling Stones were among the inaugural inductees into the UK Music Hall of Fame.

In 2014, the Jaggermeryx naida ("Jagger's water nymph"), a 19-million-year-old species of 'long-legged pig', was named after Jagger. Jaw fragments of the long-extinct anthracotheres were discovered in Egypt. The trilobite species Aegrotocatellus jaggeri was also named after Jagger. On Jagger's 75th birthday, scientists named seven fossil stoneflies after present and former members of the band. Two species, Petroperla mickjaggeri and Lapisperla keithrichardsi, were placed within a new family Petroperlidae. The new family was named in honour of the Rolling Stones, derived from the Greek "petra" that stands for "stone". The scientists referred to the fossils as "Rolling Stoneflies".

In 2023, Jagger and bandmate Keith Richards were honoured in Dartford with statues.

== In popular culture ==
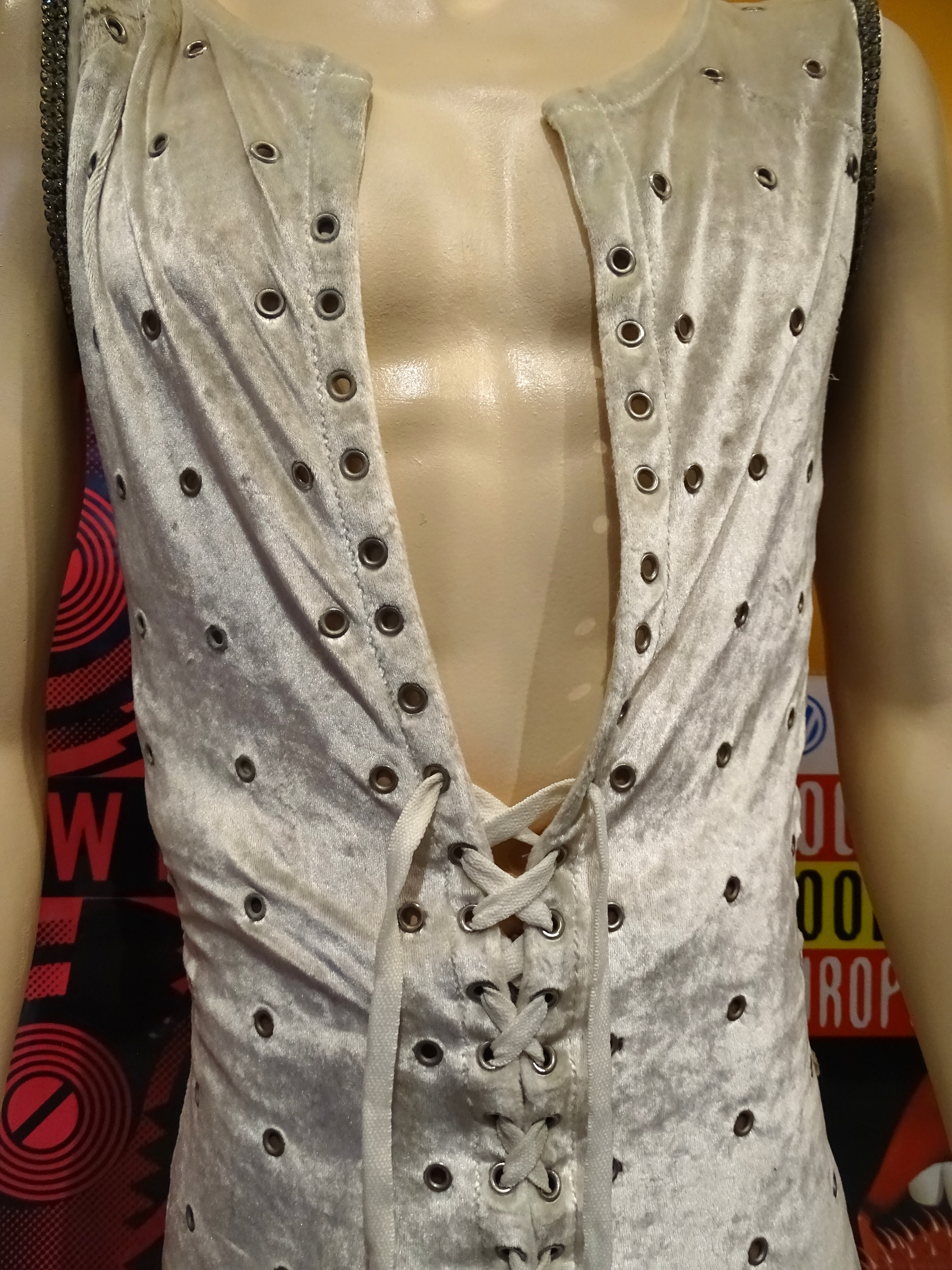
Jagger's jumpsuit from the Stones' 1972 tour on display at the Rock and Roll Hall of Fame museum in Cleveland, Ohio

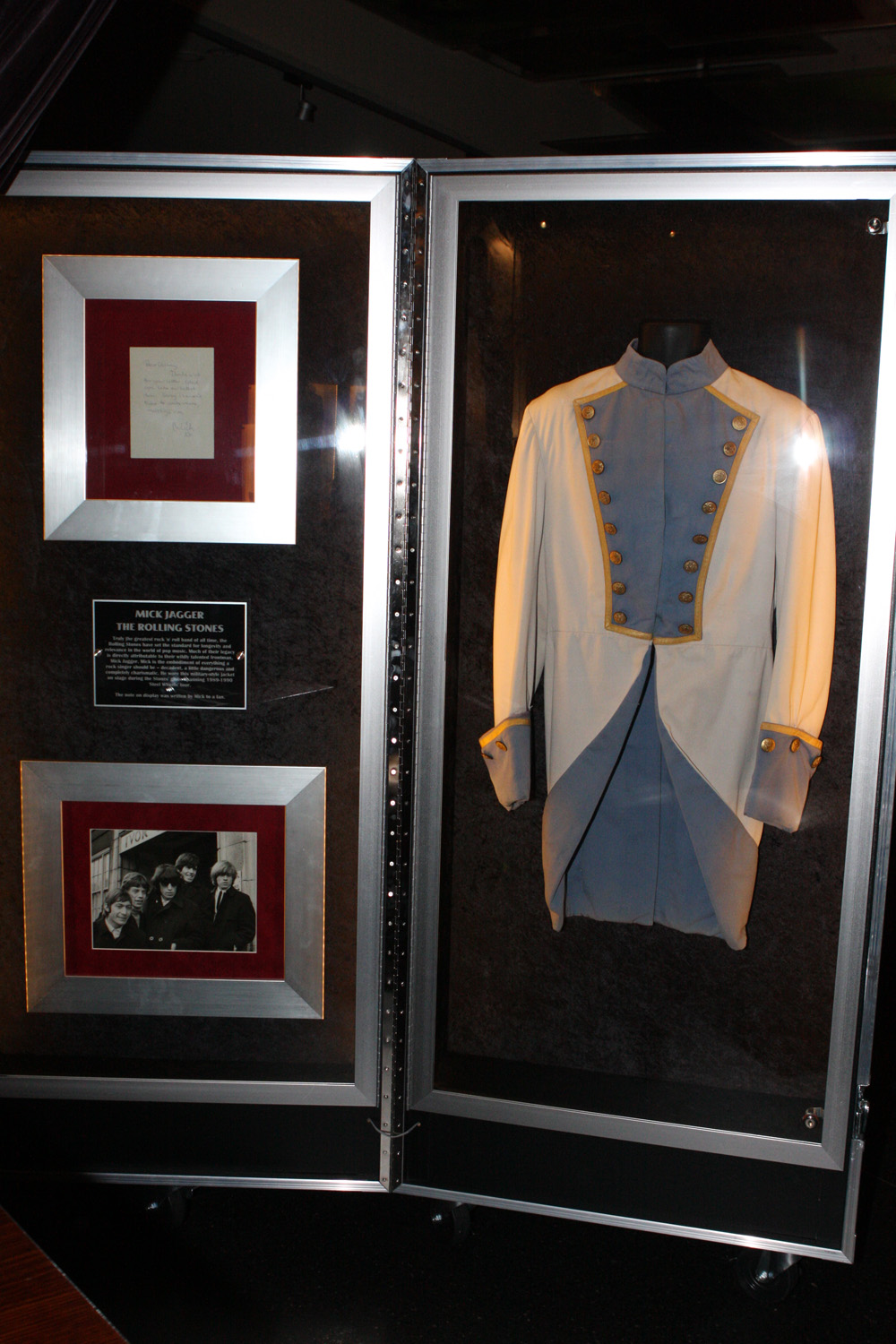
Jagger's military-style jacket worn during the 1989–1990 tour on display at Hard Rock Cafe in Sydney, Australia

From the time that the Rolling Stones developed their anti-establishment image in the mid-1960s, Jagger, with Richards, has been an enduring icon of the counterculture. This was enhanced by his drug-related arrests, sexually charged on-stage antics, provocative song lyrics, and his role in Performance. One of his biographers, Christopher Andersen, describes him as "one of the dominant cultural figures of our time", adding that Jagger was "the story of a generation". Jagger, who at the time identified as an anarchist, took part in a demonstration against the Vietnam War outside the US Embassy in London in 1968. This inspired him to write "Street Fighting Man" that same year.

In 1967, Cecil Beaton photographed Jagger's naked buttocks, a photo that sold at Sotheby's auction house in 1986 for $4,000. Jagger was reported to be a contender for the anonymous subject of Carly Simon's 1972 hit song "You're So Vain", on which he sings backing vocals. Pop artist Andy Warhol painted a series of silkscreen portraits of Jagger in 1975, one of which was owned by Farah Diba, wife of the Shah of Iran. It hung on a wall inside the royal palace in Tehran. In 2010, a retrospective exhibition of portraits of Jagger was presented at the festival Rencontres d'Arles, in France. The catalogue of the exhibition is the first photo album of Jagger and shows his evolution over 50 years.

Jagger's relationships served as the inspiration for the theatrical show parody "Jumpin' Jack", written by Lyle Victor Albert. In the show, the protagonist, Jack, is "a member of that ever-expanding, worldwide club made up of Mick Jagger's illegitimate children."

Maroon 5's song "Moves like Jagger" is about Jagger, who acknowledged the song in an interview, calling the concept "very flattering". Kesha's song "Tik Tok" and the Black Eyed Peas' hit "The Time (Dirty Bit)" refer to Jagger, and his vocal delivery is mentioned by rapper Ghostface Killah in his song "The Champ", from his 2006 album Fishscale, which was later referenced by Kanye West in the 2008 T.I. and Jay-Z single "Swagga Like Us".

On television, the ITV satirical puppet show Spitting Image caricatured Jagger as perpetually high throughout its run in the 1980s and 1990s. In 1998, the MTV animated show Celebrity Deathmatch had a clay-animated fight to the death between Jagger and Aerosmith lead singer Steven Tyler; Jagger wins the fight by using his tongue to stab Tyler through the chest. The 2000 film Almost Famous, set in 1973, refers to Jagger: "Because if you think Mick Jagger'll still be out there, trying to be a rock star at age 50 ... you're sadly, sadly mistaken." This was a view that Jagger similarly shared in 1975, once quipping to People magazine "I'd rather be dead than sing 'Satisfaction' when I'm 45".

In 2012, Jagger was among the British cultural icons selected by artist Sir Peter Blake to appear in a new version of his most famous artwork—the Beatles' Sgt. Pepper's Lonely Hearts Club Band album cover—to celebrate the British cultural figures of his life that he most admires.

In more recent decades, Jagger has been seen as a "poster boy" for healthy living and, as of 2006, was "said to run 12 km a day, to kick-box, lift weights, cycle, and practise ballet and yoga"; he has his own personal trainer. It has been estimated that during the average show, he covers between five and twelve miles on stage "while strutting and shimmying through shows at dizzying speeds".

== Legacy ==
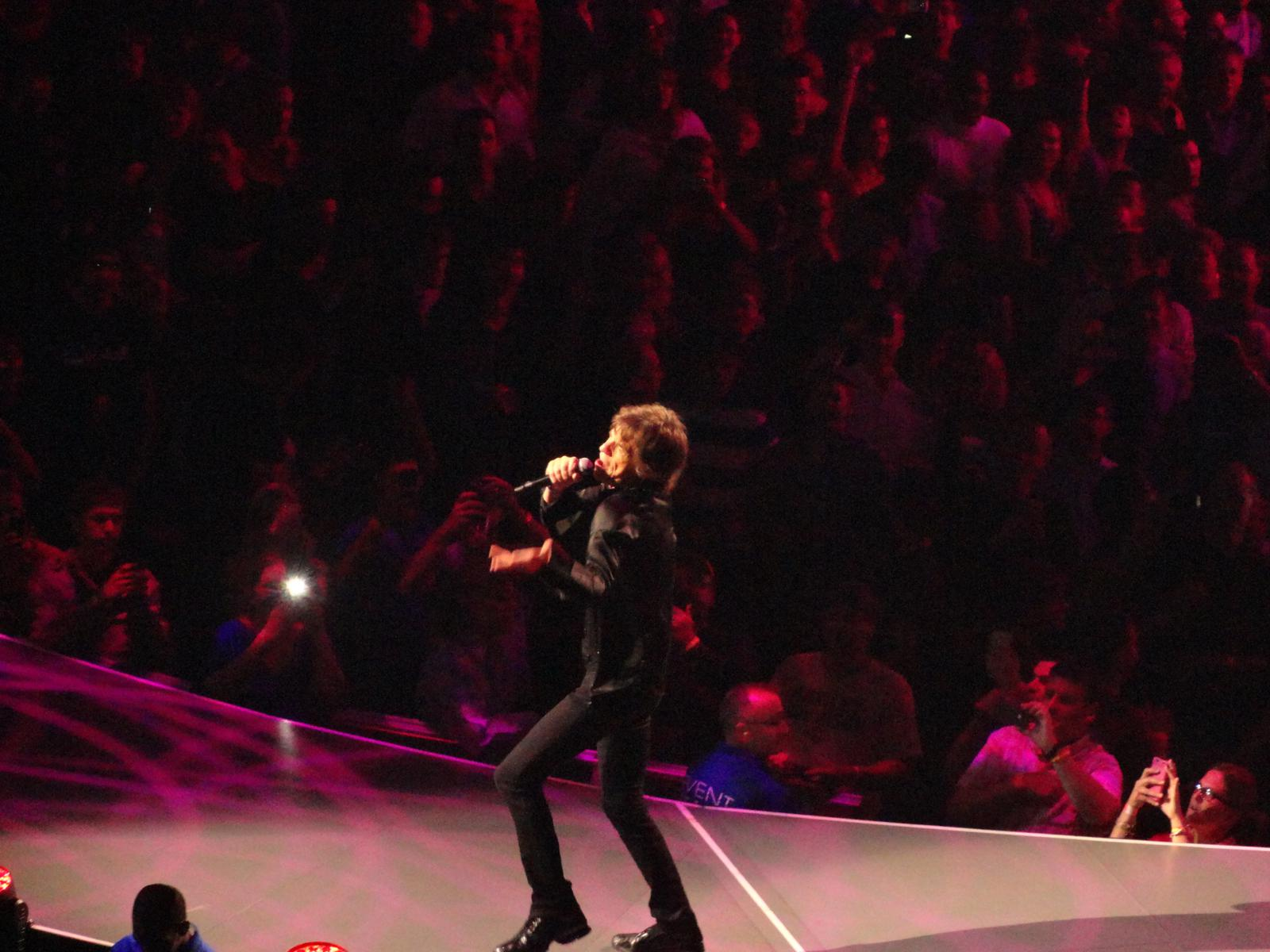
Jagger performing with the Rolling Stones during the band's 50 & Counting Tour at TD Garden in Boston, in June 2013

In the words of British dramatist and novelist Philip Norman, "the only point concerning Mick Jagger's influence over 'young people' that doctors and psychologists agreed on was that it wasn't, under any circumstances, fundamentally harmless". According to Norman, even Elvis Presley at his most scandalous had not exerted a "power so wholly and disturbingly physical". "[W]hile [Presley] made girls scream, [he] did not have Jagger's ability to make men feel uncomfortable." Norman likens Jagger in his early performances with the Rolling Stones in the 1960s to a male ballet dancer, with "his conflicting and colliding sexuality: the swan's neck and smeared harlot eyes allied to an overstuffed and straining codpiece".

His performance style has been studied by academics who analysed gender, image and sexuality. Musicologist Sheila Whiteley noted that Jagger's performance style "opened up definitions of gendered masculinity and so laid the foundations for self-invention and sexual plasticity which are now an integral part of contemporary youth culture". His stage personas also contributed significantly to the British tradition of popular music that always featured the character song and where the art of singing becomes a matter of acting—which creates a question about the singer's relationship to his own words.

His voice has been described as a powerful expressive tool for communicating feelings to his audience, and expressing an alternative vision of society. To express "virility and unrestrained passion" he developed techniques previously used by African American preachers and gospel singers such as "the roar, the guttural belt style of singing, and the buzz, a more nasal and raspy sound". Steven Van Zandt wrote: "The acceptance of Jagger's voice on pop radio was a turning point in rock & roll. He broke open the door for everyone else. Suddenly, Eric Burdon and Van Morrison weren't so weird—even Bob Dylan."

Over time, Jagger has developed into the template for rock front men and, with the help of the Stones, has, in the words of the Telegraph, "changed music" through his contributions to it as a pioneer of the modern music industry. Jagger is often described as one of the most popular and influential front men in the history of rock & roll; in 1994 the New York Times noted that his "influence hangs heavily over contemporary British rock" as many singers "incorporated elements" of his onstage presence into their personas. In 2015, Billboard ranked him among the best rock front men of all time, referring to him as "the rock and roll front man" whose "swagger brought a style and sexiness to rock music that he built on for decades" and openly wondering "would we even have rock stars without Mick?"

David Bowie joined many rock bands with blues, folk, and soul orientations in his first attempts as a musician in the mid-1960s, and he was to recall: "I used to dream of being their Mick Jagger." Bowie suggested, "I think Mick Jagger would be astounded and amazed if he realized that to many people he is not a sex symbol, but a mother image." Jagger appeared on Rolling Stone's List of 100 Greatest Singers at No. 16; in the article, Lenny Kravitz wrote: "I sometimes talk to people who sing perfectly in a technical sense who don't understand Mick Jagger. [...] His sense of pitch and melody is really sophisticated. His vocals are stunning, flawless in their own kind of perfection." This edition also cites Jagger as a key influence on Jack White, Steven Tyler and Iggy Pop. Jagger also has been known to seek out newcomer artists to the music industry and advise them.

The Telegraph has called Mick Jagger "the Rolling Stone who changed music". CNN has called Jagger's "greatest talent, besides strutting and singing" his "ability to surround himself and the rest of the band with a group of very able executives." Billboard ranked Jagger as the greatest rock lead singer of all time, writing "no one has moves like Jagger—nor the voice, the image, the fashion sense, or the remarkably enduring charisma ... After so many years, Mick Jagger continues to personify not only the Rolling Stones but rock'n'roll itself".

As Jagger has aged, his continued vitality has provoked comment. Bon Jovi front man Jon Bon Jovi said: "I can't get over it ... I'm ... dying already and I'm gonna go out there and play four songs. How do they do it?" Since his early career, Jagger has embodied what some authors describe as a "Dionysian archetype" of "eternal youth" personified by many rock stars and the rock culture.

Jagger has repeatedly said that he will not write an autobiography, but according to John Blake, after a slew of unauthorised biographies, Jagger was persuaded by Lord Weidenfeld in the early 1980s to prepare his own for a £1 million advance. The resulting 75,000-word manuscript is held by Blake, who briefly planned to publish it until Jagger withdrew support.

"Mick Jagger is the least egotistical person," observed Watts in 2008. "He'll do what's right for the band. He's not a big head—and, if he was, he went through it thirty years ago."

== Discography ==
=== Solo studio albums ===
Year	Album details
1985	She's the Boss: Released: 19 February 1985; Label: CBS Records
1987	Primitive Cool: Released: 14 September 1987; Label: CBS Records
1993	Wandering Spirit: Released: 9 February 1993; Label: Atlantic Records
2001	Goddess in the Doorway: Released: 19 November 2001; Label: Virgin Records

== Filmography ==
=== As actor ===
Year	Title	Role	Ref.
1970	Ned Kelly	Ned Kelly	
1970	Performance	Turner	
1978	All You Need Is Cash	Mick Jagger	
1987	Running Out of Luck	Fictitious version of himself	
1992	Freejack	Vacendak	
1997	Bent	Greta	
2001	Enigma	Unnamed RAF officer	
2001	The Man from Elysian Fields	Lucius Fox	
2008	The Bank Job	Bank clerk	
2019	The Burnt Orange Heresy	Joseph Cassidy	
TBA	The Three Incestuous Sisters		

Jagger was slated to appear in the 1982 film Fitzcarraldo and some scenes were shot with him, but he had to leave for a Rolling Stones' tour and his character was eliminated.

=== As producer ===
- Running Out of Luck (1987)
- Enigma (2001)
- Being Mick (2001)
- The Women (2008)
- Get on Up (2014)
- Mr. Dynamite: The Rise of James Brown (2014)
- Vinyl (2016)
