= Melanie Hamrick =

American ballet dancer (born 1987)

- Born: July 17, 1987 (age 39); Williamsburg, Virginia, U.S.
- Education: Kirov Academy of Ballet
- Occupations: Choreographer, ballerina, author
- Partner(s): Mick Jagger (2014–present; engaged)
- Children: 1
- Dancing career
- Former groups: American Ballet Theatre

Melanie Hamrick (born July 17, 1987) is an American choreographer, author, and retired ballerina. She danced with the American Ballet Theatre for fifteen years before retiring in 2019. She has written two novels, First Position and The Unraveling.

== Early life ==
Hamrick was born in Williamsburg, Virginia. She attended the Kirov Academy of Ballet for five years as a scholarship student, training under Alla Sizova, Nicolai Morozov, and Adrienne Dellas.

== Career ==
=== Ballet ===
Hamrick danced with the American Ballet Theatre for fifteen years, retiring in 2019. She spent her career as a member of the company's corps de ballet. Before joining the corps, she danced for a year in the junior company. Hamrick danced various corps and featured roles including the Fairy Candide in Alexei Ratmansky’s The Sleeping Beauty, Caroline in Lilac Garden, Flower Girl in Don Quixote, Olympia in Lady of the Camellias, Winter Fairy in Sir Frederick Ashton’s Cinderella, and other roles in Apollo and The Nutcracker. She danced her final performance in October 2019 in the company's production of George Balanchine’s Theme and Variations.

She choreographed a 2019 ballet named Porte Rouge, which was soundtracked to songs by the Rolling Stones and composed in collaboration with her partner, the band's singer, Mick Jagger.

=== Writing ===
In 2023, her debut novel, First Position, was published by Penguin Random House. The romance novel, though not autobiographical in nature, is "loosely based on some truths backstage" during Hamrick's time as a ballerina. The novel's title is a pun based on the first position in ballet. In writing First Position, Hamrick took inspiration from her life experience as a ballerina, the novel Fifty Shades of Grey, and the 2010 psychological horror film Black Swan.

She announced in March 2024 that her second novel, The Unraveling, would be released that August. Following its release, Good Morning America selected The Unravelling as a "Buzz Pick".

== Personal life ==
Hamrick is engaged to Sir Mick Jagger; the couple have a son, born in December 2016.
