= Elizabeth Jagger =

English model and actress (born 1984)

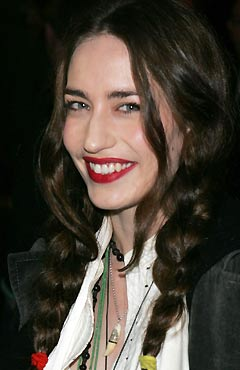
- Jagger in 2007
- Born: Elizabeth Scarlett Jagger; March 2, 1984 (age 42); New York City, U.S.
- Occupations: Activist; model; actress
- Years active: 1997–present
- Children: 1
- Parent(s): Jerry Hall (mother); Mick Jagger (father)
- Relatives: Jade Jagger (half-sister); Georgia May Jagger (sister); Chris Jagger (uncle)
- Modeling information
- Height: 5 ft 9 in (1.75 m)
- Hair color: Brown
- Eye color: Blue
- Agency: TESS Management (London)

Elizabeth Scarlett Jagger (born March 2, 1984) is a British-American activist, model and actress.

== Personal life ==
Elizabeth Jagger was born at Lenox Hill Hospital in Lenox Hill, Manhattan in New York City. She is the elder daughter of American model Jerry Hall and the Rolling Stones lead singer Mick Jagger, and she has seven siblings. Among them are Georgia May Jagger and paternal half-sister Jade Jagger. Elizabeth Jagger grew up in London, where she attended Ibstock Place School.

Jagger is an activist for the Equal Rights Amendment. Jagger successfully lobbied for the Equal Rights Amendment to pass in Illinois in 2018.

Jagger and Christopher Behlau have a son.

== Filmography ==
Year	Film	Notes
2001	Being Mick	Cameo in documentary about her father
2002	Igby Goes Down	
