= Being Mick =

2001 documentary film directed by Kevin Macdonald

- Directed by: Kevin Macdonald; Jim Gable
- Starring: Mick Jagger; Jerry Hall; Elizabeth Jagger; Elton John; Bono; Pete Townshend; Bill Wyman; Wyclef Jean; Lenny Kravitz; Keith Richards
- Theme music composer: Mick Jagger and others listed
- Country of origin: United Kingdom
- Original language: English

Production
- Producers: Victoria Pearman; Paul Sarony
- Cinematography: Kevin Macdonald
- Editor: Ian Davies
- Running time: 62 minutes
- Production company: Jagged Films

Original release
- Network: ABC
- Release: 19 November 2001

Being Mick is a 2001 documentary television film which chronicles the life of Mick Jagger for one year. Much of the film was shot by Jagger himself using a handheld camera. The film documents his recording of the Goddess in the Doorway album, as well as daily life including his family and friends. In the film, Mick attends a charity fundraiser hosted by Elton John as well as the premiere of the Kate Winslet film Enigma, which Jagger's company produced.

The film was directed by Kevin Macdonald and Jim Gable and produced by Victoria Pearman. Following its television debut on ABC on Thanksgiving night 2001, the film was released on DVD on 21 May 2002 through Lionsgate Home Entertainment.

== Cast ==
- Mick Jagger as Himself
- Bono as Himself
- Bob Geldof as Himself
- Hugh Grant as Himself
- Jerry Hall as Herself
- George Hickenlooper as Himself
- Elizabeth Jagger as Herself
- Gabriel Jagger as Himself
- Georgia Jagger as Herself
- Jade Jagger as Herself
- Wyclef Jean as Himself
- Elton John as Himself
- Lenny Kravitz as Himself
- Keith Richards as Himself
- Dougray Scott as Himself
- Sting as Himself
- James Threapleton as Himself
- Pete Townshend as Himself
- Kate Winslet as Herself
- Ron Wood as Himself
- Bill Wyman as Himself

== Reception ==
Variety was cool about the film, calling it "more the work of a talented spin doctor than an auteur".
