= Georgia May Jagger =

British-American fashion model and designer (born 1992)

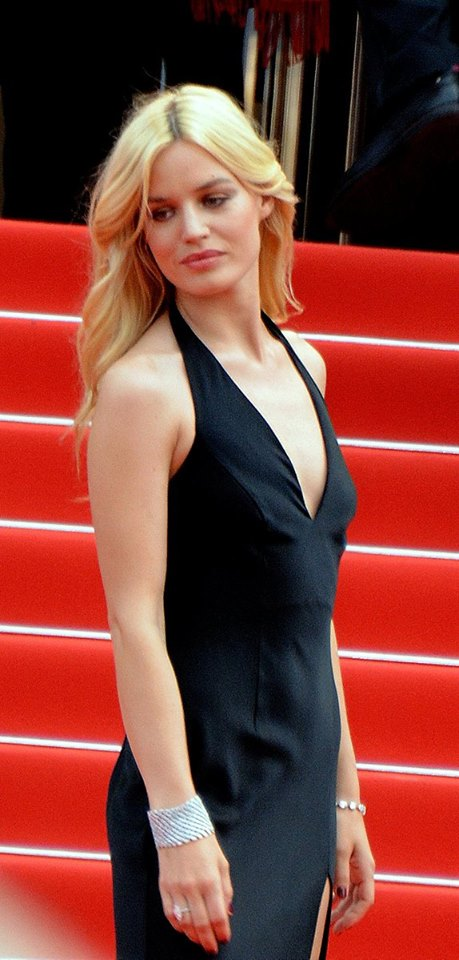
- Jagger in 2018
- Born: Georgia May Ayeesha Jagger; 12 January 1992 (age 34); London, England
- Occupations: Model; designer
- Years active: 2008–present
- Partner: Cambryan Sedlick (2021–present)
- Children: 1
- Parent(s): Jerry Hall (mother); Mick Jagger (father)
- Relatives: Jade Jagger (half-sister); Elizabeth Jagger (sister); Chris Jagger (uncle)
- Modelling information
- Height: 5 ft 7 in (1.70 m)
- Hair colour: Blonde
- Eye colour: Green

Georgia May Ayeesha Jagger (born 12 January 1992) is a British-American fashion model and designer.

== Early life ==
Georgia May Ayeesha Jagger was born on 12 January 1992 at Portland Hospital in West End, London, to British Rolling Stones lead singer Mick Jagger and American supermodel Jerry Hall. She has three siblings from her parents, including Elizabeth. Additionally, she has several half-siblings from her father's other relationship, including Jade. She was raised near Richmond Park. She went to Ibstock Place School and Collingham College. She moved to New York City in autumn 2010.

== Career ==
In 2008, Jagger signed with Independent Models, and is currently represented by TESS Model Management. She debuted at Chanel's Resort 2011 show, which she closed. She has also walked for Tommy Hilfiger, Balmain, Vivienne Westwood, Alexander Wang, Miu Miu, Sonia Rykiel, Thierry Mugler, Marchesa, Versace, Fendi, Tom Ford, rag & bone, Isabel Marant, Louis Vuitton, Marc Jacobs, and Just Cavalli among others.

In 2009, Jagger was named Model of the Year at the Fashion Awards by the British Fashion Council. She was the face of Hudson Jeans from 2009 to 2013. In 2009, she began a contract with English cosmetics company Rimmel. She has appeared in advertisements for the Thierry Mugler fragrance, Angel.

Jagger took part in the 2012 Summer Olympics closing ceremony with Kate Moss, Naomi Campbell, and Lily Donaldson, representing British fashion.

In 2014, she appeared in an international campaign for German jewellery concern Thomas Sabo's Glam & Soul and Karma Beads ladies' collections. The basis of the campaign was a short film by photographer Ellen von Unwerth.

Jagger has designed collections with Volcom and Mulberry.

== Personal life ==
Jagger is in a relationship with skateboarder Cambryan Sedlick with whom she has a son, born September 2024.
