= Jerry Hall =

American model and actress (born 1956)

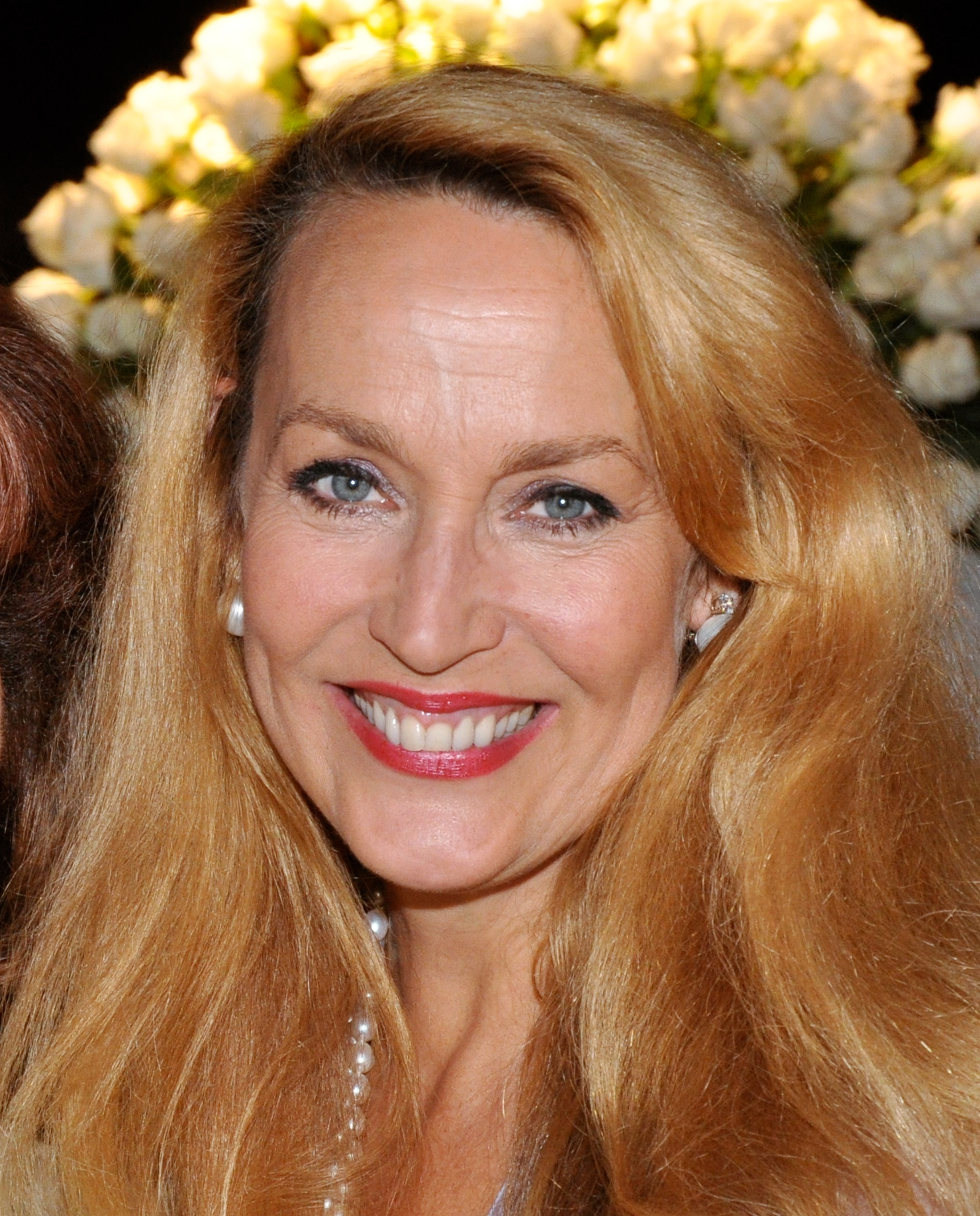
- Hall in 2009
- Born: Jerry Faye Hall; July 2, 1956 (age 70); Gonzales, Texas, U.S.
- Occupations: Model; actress
- Years active: 1973–present
- Spouse: Rupert Murdoch (m. 2016; div. 2022)
- Partner: Mick Jagger (1977–1999)
- Children: 4, including Elizabeth & Georgia May
- Modeling information
- Hair color: Blonde
- Eye color: Blue
- Agency: Tess Management

Jerry Faye Hall (born July 2, 1956) is an American model and actress. She began modeling in the 1970s and became one of the most sought-after models in the world. She transitioned into acting, appearing in the films Urban Cowboy (1980) and Batman (1989), and several stage productions. Hall was the long-term partner of Rolling Stones frontman Mick Jagger, with whom she has four children. She was the fourth wife of business magnate Rupert Murdoch until they divorced in 2022.

== Early life ==
Hall was born in Gonzales, Texas, to Marjorie (née Sheffield), a medical records librarian, and John P. Hall. She is of English, Irish, and Dutch descent.

Hall graduated from North Mesquite High School early at 16. While in high school, she also took classes at Eastfield College in archery, tennis, and gymnastics.

She has a twin sister, Terry, whose jobs have included working in a photography and printmaking shop, real-estate investing, and real-estate broker. They have three older sisters, including Rosy Hall, one of the first Dallas Cowboys Cheerleaders.

In the TV series Who Do You Think You Are?, Hall discovered that she was descended from Humphrey Best, an associate of American pioneer Daniel Boone.

== Career ==
=== Modeling ===
Jerry Hall and her twin sister Terry were in the French Riviera sunbathing on a Saint Tropez beach when fashion agent Claude Haddad discovered them. She moved to Paris when she was 16, where her first roommate was male model Tom Cashin. Her first modeling job was with photographer Helmut Newton in 1973.

Hall lived with fashion illustrator Antonio Lopez for two years and became his muse. She appeared in the guise of a mermaid on the cover of Roxy Music's album Siren (1975).

By 1977, Hall had been on 40 magazine covers, including Italian Vogue and Cosmopolitan. She was earning modeling fees in excess of $1,000 per day.

She became a close friend of Pop artist Andy Warhol and appeared on the July 1978 cover of his Interview magazine. Warhol painted her portrait in 1984. Hall was later painted by artists Francesco Clemente, Ed Ruscha, and Lucian Freud.

=== Acting and music ===
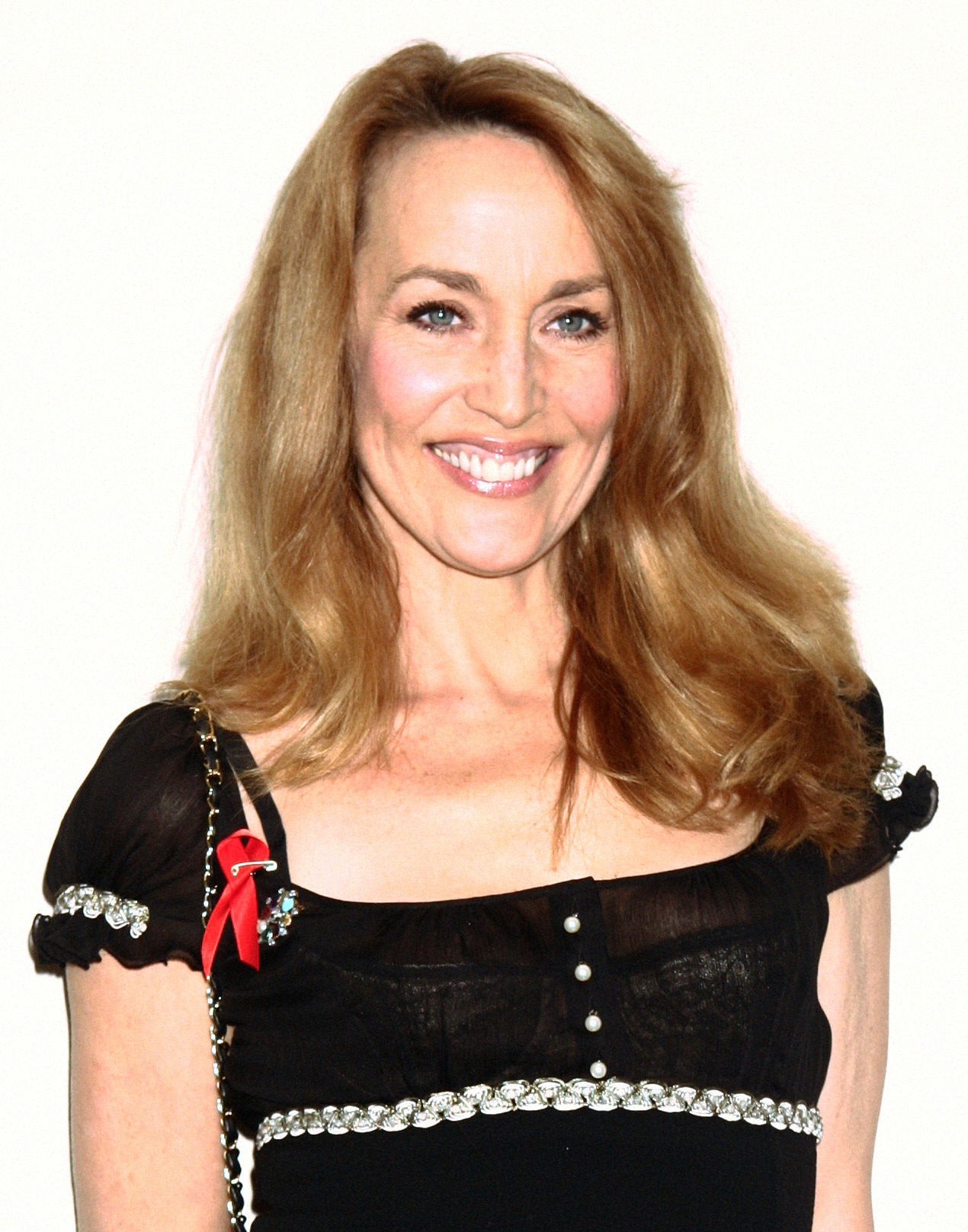
Hall in 2007

Hall acted in the films Urban Cowboy (1980) and director Tim Burton's Batman (1989).

She made her professional stage debut playing Cherie in a revival of Bus Stop in the Theaterfest summer stock, hosted at Montclair State University, in July 1988. She reprised the role for her London West End stage début in 1990 at the Lyric Theatre in Shaftesbury Avenue.

In 1990, she joined many other guests for Roger Waters' massive performance of The Wall in Berlin.

She was featured in commercials for Bovril.

Hall played the role of Miss Scarlett in the 1993 British television show Cluedo and in TV series, The Detectives.

In 2000, Hall was a judge for the Whitbread Prize. She argued for Seamus Heaney's translation of Beowulf.

From 2000 to 2001, Hall appeared as Mrs. Robinson in a Broadway production of The Graduate. She appeared in Brighton in the play Picasso's Women in 2002.

Hall was presented with the Guinness World Record in February 2004 for making the most musical appearances in a single night; she performed in six shows (The Phantom of the Opera, Les Misérables, Fame, Blood Brothers, Anything Goes, and Chitty Chitty Bang Bang) before 9,124 theatregoers in London's West End.

In 2005, Hall was at the center of Kept, a reality show based on her search for a kept man.

In 2005, Hall appeared on the West End stage playing Mother Lord in the first London production of Cole Porter's High Society. Hall provided the voice for Sister Penelope in the British cartoon Popetown first screened in New Zealand during the year. In 2007, Hall guest-starred on the British TV show Hotel Babylon. She has also appeared in the BBC comedy series French and Saunders.

Her autobiography, Jerry Hall: My Life in Pictures, was published in 2010.

In June 2012, Hall made a one-week appearance with David Soul at the Gaiety Theatre, Dublin, in a reprise of the Pulitzer Prize-nominated play Love Letters by A. R. Gurney. On September 10, 2012, Hall was announced as a contestant for the tenth series of the British dance show Strictly Come Dancing. Her professional partner was Anton du Beke. She was the second celebrity to be eliminated from the competition.

In 2014, she performed at Glastonbury. She wrote music and lyrics to original country and western music.

Hall appeared on the second series of The Celebrity Traitors in October 2026. She was voted out in episode 7.

== Personal life ==
Hall started dating musician Bryan Ferry in 1975, leaving him for musician Mick Jagger in 1977. In 1982, Hall and Jagger purchased a townhouse on Manhattan's Upper West Side, which they had restored and decorated by Warhol's onetime partner Jed Johnson. They also lived at Downe House, Richmond Hill, in Greater London, which Jagger purchased in the early 1990s.

Jagger and Hall held a Hindu wedding ceremony on November 21, 1990, in Bali, Indonesia. They separated in August 1999. The putative marriage was later declared null and void ab initio by the High Court of England and Wales in 1999, ruling that the "marriage" was not legally valid according to either Indonesian or English law. The couple have four children together: daughters Elizabeth Scarlett (born 1984) and Georgia May (born 1992) and two sons, James (born 1985) and Gabriel (born 1997).

On March 4, 2016, Hall married media business magnate Rupert Murdoch in a ceremony at the Church of England church of St Bride's, Fleet Street, eight weeks after announcing their engagement with a listing in Murdoch's The Times newspaper. Hall filed for divorce on July 1, 2022, citing irreconcilable differences; the divorce was finalized in August 2022.

Hall is dyslexic.

In 2010, she sold her art collection through Sotheby's.

== Accolades ==
In 2016, Hall won the Lifetime Achievement Award from the Fashion Group International Dallas.

== Filmography ==
=== Film ===
Year	Title	Role	Director	Notes
1980	Urban Cowboy	Sexy Sister	James Bridges	
1980	Willie & Phil	Karen	Paul Mazursky	
1986	She's with Me	Maris	John Bowab	TV movie
1988	Topo Galileo	Dr. 18	Francesco Laudadio	
1989	Batman	Alicia Hunt	Tim Burton	
1991	Bejewelled	Imelda	Terry Marcel	TV movie
1992	Freejack	Newswoman	Geoff Murphy	
1994	Princess Caraboo	Lady Motley	Michael Austin	
1995	Savage Hearts	Lady Miriam Foxley	Mark Ezra	
1995	Vampire in Brooklyn	Woman in Park	Wes Craven	
1998	RPM	Bored Girlfriend	Ian Sharp	
2002	Merci Docteur Rey	Sybil	Andrew Litvack	
2004	Tooth	Bon Bon	Edouard Nammour	
2004	Enchantment	Magician	Simon Aboud	Short film
2016	Absolutely Fabulous: The Movie	Herself	Mandie Fletcher	
2016	Gangster Kittens	Blonde Venus	Ash Mahmood; Naeem Mahmood	
2016	The Hand of the Creator	Constance	Odilon Rocha	
2017	Forgotten Man	Holly	Arran Shearing	
2018	Hellbent	Ms. Georgia Lake	Tjardus Greidanus	

=== Television ===
Year	Title	Role	Notes
1983	Faerie Tale Theatre	The Lady of the Harp / Pansy	2 episodes
1987	Married... with Children	Terry Cherry	Episode: "How Al Lost His Cherry"
1990	French and Saunders	Self	Season 3, Episode 1
1998	Lenny Goes to Town	Waitress	1 episode
2000	Just Shoot Me!	Herself	Episode: "A&E Biography: Nina Van Horn"
2001	Being Mick	Self	
2007	Hotel Babylon	Mrs. Klein	1 episode
2009	The All Star Impressions Show	Katie Price	TV special
2012	Strictly Come Dancing	Contestant	Series 10
2010	Money	Caduta Massi	2 episodes
2022	The Andy Warhol Diaries	Self	
2026	The Celebrity Traitors	Contestant	Series 2
