= Jade Jagger =

British designer and model (born 1971)

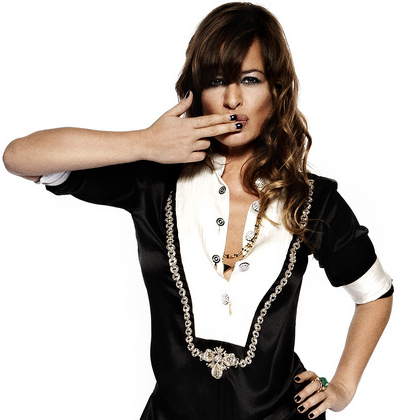
- Jagger in 2009
- Born: Jade Sheena Jezebel Jagger; 21 October 1971 (age 54); Paris, France
- Occupations: Jewellery designer; artist; interior designer
- Years active: 1996–present
- Spouse: Adrian Fillary (m. 2012)
- Partner: Piers Jackson (1990–1999)
- Children: 3
- Parent(s): Bianca Jagger (mother); Mick Jagger (father)
- Relatives: Elizabeth Jagger (half-sister); Georgia May Jagger (half-sister); Chris Jagger (uncle)

Jade Sheena Jezebel Jagger (born 21 October 1971) is a British jewellery designer, home designer, and former model. She is the daughter of Rolling Stones lead singer Mick Jagger, and 1970s fashion model and human rights advocate Bianca Jagger.

== Early life ==
Jagger was born on 21 October 1971 at Belvedere Nursing Home in Paris, the only child of rock star Mick Jagger and his first wife, Bianca Jagger. Her parents divorced when she was a child. She is of English and Nicaraguan ancestry.

Elizabeth Scarlett Jagger and Georgia May Ayeesha Jagger are her half sisters.

== Career ==
In 1996, Jagger launched Jade Inc., an integrated jewellery and fashion brand, and in 2001 she began working as the Creative Director for Garrard, an English company dealing in high-end jewellery. She worked there until 2006 and now promotes a 'lifestyle concept' called "Jezebel" (her middle name), which fuses music, clothing, and lifestyle through original recordings, remixes, unplugged sessions, and fashion. She also has worked as a lingerie model. She has also designed apartments all over the world, including a tower of luxury residences called "Jade" in New York, and another in Mumbai.

In 2001 she appeared in Being Mick, a documentary chronicling a year in the life of her father.

In 2008 Jagger's career was revived, courtesy of Belvedere. Best known in accessory circles for her time as creative director at Garrard, Jagger created the "Jagger Dagger", a sword with an 18-carat white gold hilt studded with 12 carats (2.4 g) of brilliant-cut diamonds, 42 pale sapphires, and inlaid with a central blue lapis lazuli square.

In 2009, Jagger was featured in an in-depth video clip for Observer Women's Magazine, sharing one of her creations, something she refers to as her "artwork", a "ribbon bracelet" which features some "easily available household things" such as; a "skull and wings", a tiny "palm tree, sort of reminds me of my home in Ibiza", a bunch of safety pins, "funky little bits and bobs", e.g. a little key trinket.

In 2011, Jagger was appointed for the designing of Lodha Group's Fiorenza project in Mumbai's Goregaon suburb.

== Personal life ==
While preparing for her A-Levels at Cambridge Centre for Sixth-form Studies in 1988, Jagger began a relationship with classmate Piers Jackson, with whom she has two daughters.

In 2004 Jagger began dating DJ Dan Williams. There were reports that they married in February 2009 but she has denied this.

Jagger married graphic designer/art director Adrian Fillary at Aynhoe Park, Northamptonshire, on 30 June 2012. They have a son.

Jagger was arrested in 2023 in Ibiza, Spain on charges of attacking police officers.
