= Mick Jagger discography =

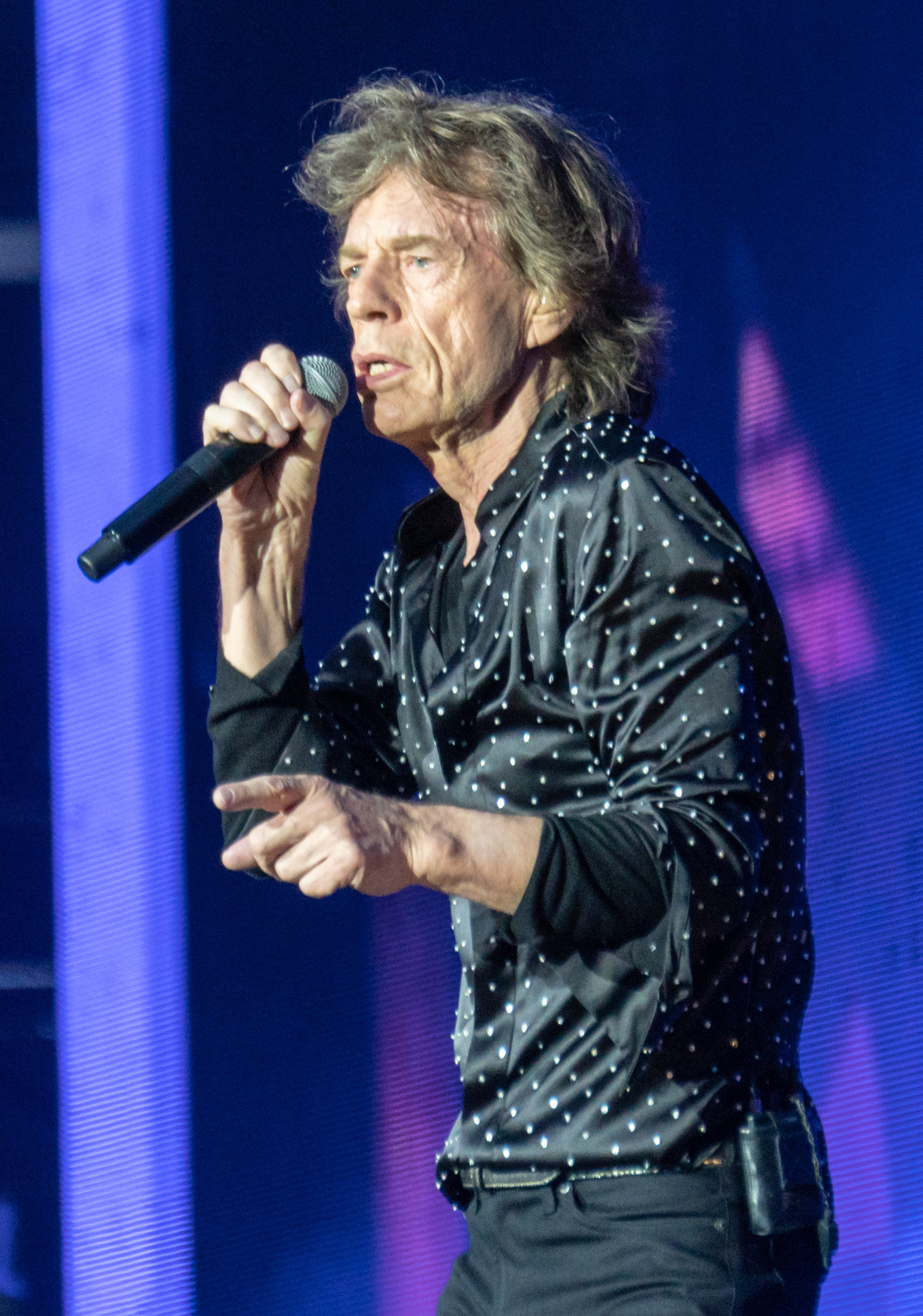
- Studio albums: 5
- Soundtrack albums: 1
- Compilation albums: 1
- Singles: 22
- Music videos: 18

Mick Jagger is a British recording artist most well known for his association with the Rolling Stones and his songwriting partner in the group, Keith Richards; their partnership is considered one of the most successful in history. As a solo artist he has released four solo albums, one collaborative album, one collaborative soundtrack album, as well as twenty-two singles, a number of them containing non-album tracks and eighteen music videos.

== Albums ==
=== Studio albums ===
List of studio albums, with selected details, chart positions and certifications
Title	Album details	Peak chart positions			Certification
Title	Album details	UK	AUS	US	Certification
Jamming with Edward! (with Ry Cooder, Nicky Hopkins, Charlie Watts and Bill Wyman)	Release date: 7 January 1972; Label: Rolling Stones	—	—	33	
She's the Boss	Released: 19 February 1985; Label: CBS	6	6	13	BPI: Silver; RIAA: Platinum
Primitive Cool	Released: 14 September 1987; Label: CBS	26	25	41	MC: Gold
Wandering Spirit	Released: 8 February 1993; Label: Atlantic	12	12	11	RIAA: Gold
Goddess in the Doorway	Released: 19 November 2001; Label: Virgin	44	65	39	BPI: Silver

=== Soundtrack albums ===
List of soundtrack albums, with selected details and chart position
Title	Album details	Peak chart positions
Title	Album details	US
Alfie (with Dave Stewart)	Release date: 18 October 2004; Label: Virgin	171

=== Compilations ===
List of compilations, with selected details and chart position
Title	Album details	Peak chart positions		
Title	Album details	CAN	UK	US
The Very Best of Mick Jagger	Released: 1 October 2007; Label: Atlantic/Rhino Records	87	57	77

=== Collaborative albums ===
- SuperHeavy: with the supergroup SuperHeavy composed of Jagger, Damian Marley, Joss Stone, David A. Stewart and A. R.Rahman (2011)

== Singles ==
List of singles, with selected chart positions
Year	Title	Peak chart positions								Album
Year	Title	UK	AUS	GER	IRE	US	US Main	US Dance	US Sales	Album
1970	"Memo from Turner"	32	—	23	—	—	—	—	—	Performance (soundtrack)
1985	"Just Another Night"	32	13	16	21	12	1	11	—	She's the Boss
1985	"Lonely at the Top"	—	—	—	—	—	9	—	—	She's the Boss
1985	"Lucky in Love"	91	77	44	—	38	5	11	—	She's the Boss
1985	"Hard Woman"	—	—	57	—	—	—	—	—	She's the Boss
1985	"Dancing in the Street" (with David Bowie)	1	1	6	1	7	3	4	—	Single only
1986	"Ruthless People" (B-side non-album "I'm Ringing")	—	—	—	—	51	14	29	—	Ruthless People (soundtrack)
1987	"Let's Work" (B-side non-album "Catch as Catch Can")	31	24	29	24	39	7	32	—	Primitive Cool
1987	"Throwaway"	—	—	—	—	67	7	—	—	Primitive Cool
1987	"Say You Will"	—	21	—	—	—	39	—	—	Primitive Cool
1988	"Primitive Cool"	—	98	—	—	—	—	—	—	Primitive Cool
1993	"Sweet Thing"	24	18	23	—	84	34	—	—	Wandering Spirit
1993	"Wired All Night"	—	—	—	—	—	3	—	—	Wandering Spirit
1993	"Don't Tear Me Up"	86	108	77	—	—	1	—	—	Wandering Spirit
1993	"Out of Focus"	—	—	70	—	—	—	—	—	Wandering Spirit
2001	"God Gave Me Everything" (B-side non-album "Blue")	—	—	60	—	—	24	—	—	Goddess in the Doorway
2002	"Visions of Paradise"	43	—	77	—	—	—	—	—	Goddess in the Doorway
2004	"Old Habits Die Hard" (with Dave Stewart)	45	—	62	—	—	—	—	—	Alfie (soundtrack)
2008	"Charmed Life"	—	—	—	—	—	—	18	—	The Very Best of Mick Jagger
2017	"Gotta Get a Grip/England Lost"	—	—	109	—	—	—	—	2	Non-album singles
2021	"Eazy Sleazy" (with Dave Grohl)	—	—	—	—	—	—	—	—	Non-album singles
2022	"Strange Game"	—	—	—	—	—	—	—	—	Slow Horses (soundtrack)
"—" denotes releases did not chart

== Other appearances ==
=== Feature singles ===
List of appearances on singles as a featured artist
Year	Title	Peak chart positions					Artist	Album
Year	Title	UK	AUS	GER	IRE	US	Artist	Album
1978	"(You Gotta Walk) Don't Look Back"	43	20	—	—	81	Peter Tosh	Bush Doctor
1984	"State of Shock"	14	10	23	8	3	The Jacksons	Victory
2011	"T.H.E. (The Hardest Ever)"	3	57	—	13	36	will.i.am	Non-album single
"—" denotes releases did not chart

=== On other artists' albums ===
- 1966: The Art of Chris Farlowe by Chris Farlowe: Mick on backing vocals and production.
- 1967: All You Need Is Love by the Beatles on the album Magical Mystery Tour: Mick on backing vocals, with Keith Richards , Marianne Faithfull, Eric Clapton, etc.
- 1972: You're So Vain by Carly Simon from the album No Secrets: backing vocals from the 2nd chorus.
- 1977: I'M IN YOU by Peter Frampton
- 1978: Bush Doctor by Peter Tosh
- 1984: State of Shock by The Jacksons: Mick on co-lead vocals with Michael Jackson on the Victory album.
- 1994: Atcha by Chris Jagger
- 1995: Title track of The Long Black Veil by The Chieftains: lead vocals
- 1996: Way past blue by Jimmy Rip
- 2001: Pay Pack & Follow by John Phillips
- 2002: Sleepless by Peter Wolf: Duet with Wolf on "Nothing But The Wheel."
- 2004: "Old Habits Die Hard" with Sheryl Crow and David A. Stewart; from the film Alfie (2004).
- 2006: The Rocky Road to Dublin by the Chieftains; the Rolling Stones play on this song from the compilation The Essential Chieftains.
- 2006: Last Man Standing by Jerry Lee Lewis: Co-lead vocals with Lewis on "Evening Gown" (written by Jagger); Ron Wood on steel guitar.
- 2006: Paint It Black – Symphonic Music of the Rolling Stones by the London Symphony Orchestra featuring Mick Jagger, Michael Hutchence & Marianne Faithfull.
- 2006: Act of Faith by Chris Jagger
- 2007: Putamayo Presents World Hits (Various Artists): Jagger sings with Peter Tosh on the Smokey Robinson song "(You Gotta Walk And) Don't Look Back."
- 2008: Stones World by Tim Ries
- 2010: Mean Old Man by Jerry Lee Lewis: Co-lead vocals on "Dead Flowers."
- 2011: Boogie 4 Stu by Ben Waters
- 2013: Concertina Jack by Chris Jagger
- 2015: Cass County by Don Henley; harmonica and lead vocals on "Bramble Rose".
- 2017: "DJ Blues" by Chris Jagger from the album All the Best; Mick on backing vocals.
- 2018: The Blues Is Alive and Well by Buddy Guy, Mick on vocals on "You Did The Crime"; Keith Richards also plays on the album with Jeff Beck on "Cognac."
- 2021: Mixing up the medicine by Chris Jagger

== Music videos ==
Year	Title	Album
1985	"Just Another Night"	She's the Boss
1985	"Lucky in Love"	She's the Boss
1985	"Dancing in the Street" (with David Bowie)	non-album
1987	"Let's Work"	Primitive Cool
1987	"Throwaway"	Primitive Cool
1987	"Say You Will"	Primitive Cool
1987	"Primitive Cool"	Primitive Cool
1993	"Sweet Thing"	Wandering Spirit
1993	"Don't Tear Me Up"	Wandering Spirit
2001	"God Gave Me Everything"	Goddess in the Doorway
2001	"Visions of Paradise"	Goddess in the Doorway
2004	"Old Habits Die Hard" (with Dave Stewart)	Alfie soundtrack
2007	"Charmed Life"	The Very Best of Mick Jagger
2017	"England Lost"	non-album
2017	"Gotta Get a Grip"	non-album
2017	"England Lost" (lyric video) (with Skepta)	non-album
2021	"Eazy Sleazy" (lyric video) (with Dave Grohl)	non-album
2022	"Strange Game" (lyric video)	Slow Horses soundtrack
