= The Very Best of Mick Jagger =

Compilation album by Mick Jagger
- Released: 1 October 2007
- Recorded: 1968–2007
- Length: 72:04
- Label: WEA/Rhino
- Producer: Mick Jagger, Lenny Kravitz, Rick Rubin, John Lennon, Bill Laswell, David A. Stewart, Clive Langer, Alan Winstanley, Jack Nitzsche, Matt Clifford, Marti Frederiksen, Peter Tosh, Robert Shakespeare

Mick Jagger chronology
Alfie (2004)	The Very Best of Mick Jagger (2007)

Singles from The Very Best of Mick Jagger
- 1. "Charmed Life" Released: 2008

Professional ratings
Review scores
Source	Rating
AllMusic	4/5 stars
Rolling Stone	4.5/5 stars

The Very Best of Mick Jagger is a compilation album that was released worldwide on 1 October 2007 and the following day in the United States on WEA/Rhino Records. This 17-track release is the first ever overview of Mick Jagger's solo career.

The collection includes singles, album tracks, and collaborations with John Lennon, David Bowie, Bono, Lenny Kravitz, Peter Tosh, Ry Cooder, David A. Stewart and Jeff Beck among others. It includes three previously unreleased songs:

- "Too Many Cooks", produced by John Lennon and recorded by Jagger in 1973 in Los Angeles. The track features guitarists Danny Kortchmar and Jesse Ed Davis, keyboardist Al Kooper, bassist Jack Bruce, drummer Jim Keltner and, on backing vocals, singer-songwriter Harry Nilsson. Neither Lennon nor Bill Wyman, who was present at the session, appear on the track.
- "Checking Up on My Baby", recorded in 1992 with L.A. blues band, The Red Devils.
- "Charmed Life", recorded while Jagger was working on Wandering Spirit with producer Rick Rubin. Jagger had sketched it out (with his daughter Karis Jagger on backing vocals), but then decided the track didn't fit with the rest of the album. The version on Very Best is remixed by producer Ashley Beadle. The song was also released as a promo single with various remixes, and reached the Top 20 on Billboard's Hot Dance Singles chart in early 2008.

A special edition with DVD was also released with more than 72 minutes of content, including an extensive interview with Mick Jagger from early/mid-2007, nine videos, and extras.

Jagger has promoted the album through interviews including a special for Rolling Stone, a comprehensive Q&A with fans on the BBC web site and TV appearances. He also re-launched his web site with audio, video, photos and more information about this compilation and his solo work in general.

The album debuted in the British chart at No. 57 with sales of nearly 4,000 copies and in the American chart at No. 77 selling 11,846 copies during the first week.

== Track listing ==
No.	Title	Writer(s)	Original album	Length
1.	"God Gave Me Everything"	Mick Jagger, Lenny Kravitz	Goddess in the Doorway	3:32
2.	"Put Me in the Trash"	Jagger, Jimmy Rip	Wandering Spirit	3:34
3.	"Just Another Night"	Jagger	She's the Boss	5:15
4.	"Don't Tear Me Up"	Jagger	Wandering Spirit	4:21
5.	"Charmed Life"	Jagger	Previously unreleased – 1992 Outtake	3:35
6.	"Sweet Thing"	Jagger	Wandering Spirit	4:18
7.	"Old Habits Die Hard"	Jagger, David A. Stewart	Alfie	4:24
8.	"Dancing in the Street" (With David Bowie)	Marvin Gaye, Ivy Jo Hunter, William "Mickey" Stevenson	Non-album single	3:18
9.	"Too Many Cooks (Spoil the Soup)"	Angelo Bond, Ronald Dunbar, Edith Wayne	Previously unreleased – 1973 Outtake	4:04
10.	"Memo from Turner"	Jagger, Keith Richards	Performance	4:03
11.	"Lucky in Love"	Jagger, Carlos Alomar	She's the Boss	5:02
12.	"Let's Work"	Jagger, Stewart	Primitive Cool	4:44
13.	"Joy"	Jagger, Bono	Goddess in the Doorway	4:40
14.	"Don't Call Me Up"	Jagger	Goddess in the Doorway	5:13
15.	"Checkin' Up on My Baby"	Sonny Boy Williamson II	Previously unreleased – 1992 Outtake	3:21
16.	"(You Got To Walk And) Don't Look Back"	Smokey Robinson, Ronnie White	Bush Doctor	3:43
17.	"Evening Gown"	Jagger	Wandering Spirit	3:32
Total length:				1:12:13

Digital Download bonus tracks
No.	Title	Length
18.	"Charmed Life" (Ashley Beedle 12" Mix)	6:20
19.	"Charmed Life" (Ashley Beedle 12" Dub)	5:24
20.	"Everybody Knows About My Good Thing"	4:37
21.	"Say You Will" (Instrumental Remix)	5:32
22.	"Lucky in Love" (Single Mix)	4:52
23.	"Sweet Thing" (Funky Guitar Mix)	4:22
Total length:		1:43:20

=== DVD track listing ===
No.	Title	Length
1.	"Interview With Mick Jagger (2007)"	35:45
2.	"God Gave Me Everything"	3:41
3.	"Just Another Night"	4:58
4.	"Sweet Thing"	4:15
5.	"Let's Work"	4:08
6.	"Lucky in Love"	4:54
7.	"Don't Tear Me Up"	4:09
8.	"Dancing in the Street"	2:57
9.	"Joy (Note: Excerpt from the documentary Being Mick)"	3:07
10.	"(You Got to Walk And) Don't Look Back (Note: Peter Tosh with Mick Jagger on Saturday Night Live, 1978)"	4:20
Total length:		72:14

== Charts ==
Chart (2007)	Peak position
European Top 100 Albums	18
Hungarian Albums (MAHASZ)	11
UK Albums (OCC)	57
US Billboard 200	77
