= Checkin' Up on My Baby =

Song written by Sonny Boy Williamson II

Song by Sonny Boy Williamson II

from the album The Real Folk Blues
- Released: 1966
- Recorded: Chicago, April 14, 1960
- Genre: Blues
- Length: 1:53
- Label: Chess
- Songwriter(s): Sonny Boy Williamson II
- Producer(s): Leonard Chess, Phil Chess, Willie Dixon

"Checkin' Up on My Baby" (or sometimes "Checking On My Baby") is a song recorded by Sonny Boy Williamson II in 1960 that has become a classic of the blues. The song was not released as a single, but was included on Williamson's The Real Folk Blues album released after his death in 1965. The song has been recorded by numerous blues and other artists, making it one of Williamson's most recorded songs.

== Earlier songs ==
Williamson's namesake Sonny Boy Williamson I, also known as John Lee Williamson, recorded an earlier song titled "Check Up on My Baby" in 1944. It is a topical song, with references to World War II political figures (its flip side is titled "Win the War Blues"). Although it has a different melody and lyrics, the refrain includes the line "I've got to check up on my baby, I've got to see how my baby been getting along", similar to "I'm checkin' up on my baby, find out what she's puttin' down", which later appears in the Sonny Boy Williamson II song. In 1958, Otis Rush recorded a slow blues titled "Checking on My Baby" (Cobra 5027) with different lyrics, with Rush listed as the songwriter.

== Composition and recording ==
In 1960, Sonny Boy Williamson II recorded "Checkin' Up on My Baby" as an uptempo Chicago blues shuffle that features his harmonica playing.

I'm checkin' up on my baby, find out what she puttin' down (2×)
So many nights and days, you know I have been out of town

Backing Williamson on vocal and harmonica are Otis Spann on piano, Robert Jr. Lockwood and Luther Tucker on guitars, Fred Below on drums, and an unidentified bassist. Despite its brief length (less than two minutes), blues historian Gérard Herzhaft has been identified the song as among "the most accomplished masterpieces of postwar blues". The song was first released on the Williamson Chess Records compilation The Real Folk Blues in 1966.

== Renditions ==
"Checkin' Up on My Baby" has been interpreted and recorded by a variety of artists, often by blues harp players. Junior Wells made it "one of his key titles", according to Herzhaft. In 1992, Rolling Stones' frontman Mick Jagger recorded the song with the Red Devils, which was not released until 2007 on The Very Best of Mick Jagger compilation. In an album review for AllMusic, Stephen Thomas Erlewine called it Jagger's second most accomplished performance outside of the Stones after "Memo from Turner", his contribution to the soundtrack of the 1970 film Performance. The Red Devils' Lester Butler performed the blues harp for the piece, whose playing impressed Jagger; "At one point I heard Rick [producer Rick Rubin] call out, 'Hey Mick, play some harp!' recalls [group guitarist] David Lee Bartel. But he [Jagger] said, 'No, I'm just here to sing'" in deference to Butler.
