= Devil Woman =

Devil Woman may refer to:

- "Devil Woman" (Marty Robbins song) (1962)
- "Devil Woman", a 1970 song by Clarence Carter, written by George Jackson
- "Devil Woman", a 1973 song by Ringo Starr from Ringo
- "Devil Woman" (Cliff Richard song) (1976)
- "Devil Woman", a 1992 song by The Red Devils (blues band) from King King
- "Devil Woman", a 2002 song by Poison from Hollyweird
- "Devil Woman", a 2005 song by Cradle of Filth from Nymphetamine

== See also ==
- The Devil Is a Woman (disambiguation)
- She devil (disambiguation)
- A Devil of a Woman, a 1951 Austrian drama film
- Eva (1962 film), a psychological drama film, also known as Eva (the Devil's Woman)
- Devil Lady, aka Devilman Lady, a Japanese horror manga and anime series
