= Lester Butler =

- Born: November 12, 1959; Virginia, U.S.
- Died: May 9, 1998 (aged 38); Los Angeles
- Genres: Blues, roots rock
- Occupation: Musician
- Instrument(s): Harmonica, vocals
- Labels: Def American

Lester Butler (November 12, 1959 – May 9, 1998) was an American blues harmonica player and singer. He achieved fame as the singer and harmonica player for the Los Angeles, California, blues rock band, the Red Devils

== Biography ==
Butler was born in the U.S. state of Virginia. The Red Devils released one album, 1992's King King, which producer Rick Rubin released on his Def American record label. In June 1992, the Red Devils recorded 13 tracks (and numerous alternate takes) with Mick Jagger, again produced by Rubin. Though not issued at the time, one song, "Checkin' Up on My Baby", was officially released in 2007 on The Very Best of Mick Jagger. The Devils also recorded songs with Johnny Cash, which were released in 2003 on the posthumous Cash boxed set Unearthed.

After the breakup of the Red Devils, Butler fronted the band, 13, releasing one self-titled album on Hightone Records in 1997. Butler achieved his greatest fame in Europe, especially the Netherlands. He died of an overdose of heroin and cocaine on May 9, 1998, in Los Angeles at the age of 38. Two friends, who were involved in his overdose, were convicted of manslaughter.

== Discography ==
- King King – The Red Devils (Def American, 1992)
- Blackwater Roll (4-song EP) – The Red Devils (This Way Up/Def American, 1993)
- 13 Featuring Lester Butler – 13 featuring Lester Butler (Hightone, 1997)
- Live @ Tamines 1997 – Lester Butler featuring 13 (Rockbeat, 2015)

Butler also recorded harmonica with several other musicians:

- Billy Boy Arnold – "Shake Your Hips", which appears on the album, Back Where I Belong (Alligator, 1993)
- Johnny Rivers – "Chicago Bound" and "Rollin' Stone", on Last Train to Memphis (Soul City, 1996 [rel. 1998])
- King Ernest – "Black Bag Blues", on King of Hearts (Evidence Music, 1997)
- R. L. Burnside – "It's Bad You Know", on Come On In (Fat Possum, 1998)
- Rancid – "Intro", on Life Won't Wait (Epitaph, 1998)
