= Bring It On Home (Sonny Boy Williamson II song) =

1966 single by Sonny Boy Williamson II

Single by Sonny Boy Williamson II

from the album The Real Folk Blues
- B-side: "Down Child"
- Released: 1966
- Recorded: January 11, 1963
- Studio: Chess, Chicago
- Genre: Blues
- Length: 2:35
- Label: Checker
- Songwriter: Willie Dixon
- Producers: Leonard Chess; Phil Chess; Willie Dixon

Sonny Boy Williamson II singles chronology
"My Younger Days" (1964)	"Bring It On Home" (1966)

"Bring It On Home" is a blues song written by American music arranger and songwriter Willie Dixon. Sonny Boy Williamson II recorded it in 1963, but the song was not released until 1966. Led Zeppelin adapted it in part as a homage to Williamson in 1969 and subsequently, the song has been recorded by several artists.

== Recording and release ==
Sonny Boy Williamson recorded the song on January 11, 1963, in Chicago. He alternates his vocal sections with harmonica phrases, accompanied by Matt "Guitar" Murphy on guitar, Milton Rector on bass guitar, Al Duncan on drums, and either Lafayette Leake or Billy Emerson on organ.

AllMusic reviewer Bill Janovitz describes Williamson's harp playing as "subdued" and his vocal delivery as "smooth": "The swinging music chugs like a train, a feeling it is supposed to evoke for the lyrics

I done bought my ticket, I got my load
Conductor done hollered, 'All, aboard'
Take my seat and ride way back
And watch this train move down the track ...
I'm gonna bring it on home to you"

"Bring It On Home" was released three years later in early 1966, when it was included on the Chess Records Williamson compilation The Real Folk Blues. Chess subsidiary Checker Records also released it as a single, but it did not reach the record charts.

== Led Zeppelin version ==
"Bring It On Home"
- Italian single picture sleeve

Song by Led Zeppelin

from the album Led Zeppelin II
- Released: October 22, 1969
- Recorded: May 4–5, 1969; May 10, 1969; July 1969 (?)
- Studio: Mystic, Hollywood, California; R&D, Vancouver; Atlantic, New York City
- Genre: Hard rock
- Length: 4:19
- Label: Atlantic
- Songwriter: Willie Dixon
- Producer: Jimmy Page

Audio
- "Bring It On Home" on YouTube

In 1969, English rock band Led Zeppelin recorded a version of "Bring It On Home" for the band's second album Led Zeppelin II. The intro and outro were deliberate homages to the Sonny Boy Williamson song, whereas the rest of the track was an original composition by Jimmy Page and Robert Plant.

Led Zeppelin performed "Bring It On Home" in concert at different points in their career. A recording from a June 25, 1972, concert in Los Angeles is included on How the West Was Won. In 1973, a portion of the song was used to link performances of "Celebration Day" and "Black Dog" and it was played at the reunion of surviving Led Zeppelin members staged at Jason Bonham's wedding reception in May 1990.

=== Copyright issue ===
Without songwriter Willie Dixon's knowledge, Arc Music, the music publishing arm of Chess Records, brought a claim against Led Zeppelin for using "Bring It On Home" without its permission. The group maintained that they copied parts of the song as an intentional tribute to Williamson, but resolved the matter with an undisclosed cash settlement. For the 2003 live album How the West Was Won, the song was credited to Dixon alone, with the note "Medley contains 'Bring It On Back' (Jimmy Page/Robert Plant/John Paul Jones/John Bonham)". On the 2014 Led Zeppelin II reissue, Dixon is listed as the sole songwriter.

=== Personnel ===
According to Jean-Michel Guesdon and Philippe Margotin:

- Robert Plant – vocals, harmonica
- Jimmy Page – guitars
- John Paul Jones – bass
- John Bonham – drums, percussion

== See also ==
- List of Led Zeppelin songs written or inspired by others

== Bibliography ==
- Guesdon, Jean-Michel; Margotin, Philippe (2018). Led Zeppelin All the Songs: The Story Behind Every Track. Running Press. ISBN 978-0-316-448-67-3.
