= She devil =

A she devil is a female devil and may also refer to:

== Film ==
- The She-Devil, a 1918 American film
- She Devil (1934 film) or Drums O' Voodoo, an American film
- Tarzan and the She-Devil, a 1953 American film
- She Devil (1957 film), an American film
- She-Devil (1989 film), an American film

== Literature ==
- Trois Filles de leur mère, a 1926 novel by Pierre Louÿs, sometimes translated into English as The She-Devils
- The Life and Loves of a She-Devil, a 1983 novel by Fay Weldon

== Other uses ==
- She Devil (mountain), a mountain in Idaho, United States
- Shanna the She-Devil, a Marvel Comics character
- The Life and Loves of a She-Devil (TV series), a British television series
- She Devils, an Argentine band
- Penn Jersey She Devils, an American roller derby league

== See also ==
- Devil Woman (disambiguation)
- She Demons, a 1958 American film
- She-Devils on Wheels, a 1968 American film
- She Devils in Chains or Ebony, Ivory & Jade, a 1976 Filipino-American film
- Succubus
