= The Real Folk Blues =

Album series released by Chess

The Real Folk Blues is a series of blues albums released between 1965 and 1967 by Chess Records, later reissued MCA Records. Each album in the series highlighted the music of one major Chess artist, including John Lee Hooker, Howlin' Wolf, Muddy Waters, and Sonny Boy Williamson II. The series, overseen by Marshall Chess, was a reaction to the increasing audience for the blues following the British Invasion. Companion discs, titled More Real Folk Blues, were released for many of the artists. Hooker's companion disc was not released until 1991. Beginning in 1999 the albums were re-released as single-disc compilations.

== Albums in the series ==
- Muddy Waters, The Real Folk Blues (LP-1501, 1965; CHD-9274, 1987)
- Howlin' Wolf, The Real Folk Blues (LP-1502, 1965; CHD-9273, 1987)
- Sonny Boy Williamson II, The Real Folk Blues (LP-1503, January 1966; CHD-9272, 1987)
- John Lee Hooker, The Real Folk Blues (LPS-1508, 1966; CHD-9271, 1987)
- Sonny Boy Williamson II, More Real Folk Blues (LPS-1509, September 1967; CHD-9277, 1987)
- Memphis Slim, The Real Folk Blues (LPS-1510, 1966; CHD-9270, 1987)
- Muddy Waters, More Real Folk Blues (LPS-1511, 1967; CHD-9278, 1987)
- Howlin' Wolf, More Real Folk Blues (LPS-1512, 1967; CHD-9279, 1987)
- John Lee Hooker, More Real Folk Blues: The Missing Album (CHD-9329, 1966 [1991])
- Howlin' Wolf, The Real Folk Blues/More Real Folk Blues (088 112 820, 2002)
- John Lee Hooker, The Real Folk Blues/More Real Folk Blues (088 112 821, 2002)
- Muddy Waters, The Real Folk Blues/More Real Folk Blues (088 112 822, 2002)
- Sonny Boy Williamson II, The Real Folk Blues/More Real Folk Blues (088 112 823, 2002)
