= More Real Folk Blues (Muddy Waters album) =

Compilation album by Muddy Waters
- Released: January 27, 1967
- Recorded: November 1948 – January 1953
- Studio: Chicago, IL
- Genre: Blues
- Length: 34:43
- Label: Chess; LP 1511
- Producer: Marshall Chess

Muddy Waters chronology
| Muddy, Brass & the Blues (1966) | More Real Folk Blues (1967) | Super Blues (1967) |

More Real Folk Blues is an album compiling singles recorded by blues musician Muddy Waters between 1948 and 1953, released by the Chess label in 1967.

== Reception ==
Professional ratings
Review scores
| Source | Rating |
|---|---|
| AllMusic | 4.5/5 stars |

AllMusic reviewer Cub Koda stated, "The companion volume to the first Waters entry in the Real Folk Blues series is even more down-home than the first. Featuring another brace of early Chess sides from 1948-1952, this release features some essential tracks ... this is a fine budget package that Muddy (and lovers of early Chicago blues) fans certainly shouldn't overlook". PopMatters' Marshall Bowden noted, "More Real Folk Blues contains music from a much more compact period of Waters' career, 1948-1952 ... with most of the tracks featuring Waters and the bassist Ernest "Big" Crawford, sometimes with the addition of harmonica. Also interesting is the fact that despite the "folk blues" sound of these recordings, all of the tracks were actually written by Waters himself ... There is no question that one is in the presence of a blues master when listening to these recordings".

== Track listing ==
All compositions credited to McKinley Morganfield

1. "Sad Letter" – 3:02
2. "You're Gonna Need My Help I Said" – 3:07
3. "Sittin' Here and Drinkin'" – 2:35
4. "Down South Blues" – 2:54
5. "Train Fare Home" – 2:47
6. "Kind Hearted Woman" – 2:37
7. "Appealing Blues" – 2:50
8. "Early Morning Blues" – 3:09
9. "Too Young to Know" – 3:13
10. "She's Alright" – 2:31
11. "Landlady" – 2:38
12. "Honey Bee" – 3:20
- Recorded in Chicago, IL, in November 1948 (tracks 3–6), June 1950 (tracks 1, 2, 7 & 8), January 23, 1951 (tracks 9 & 12) and December 1952 or January 1953 (tracks 10 & 11).

== Personnel ==
- Muddy Waters – vocals, guitar
- Little Walter – harmonica (tracks 1, 2 & 9–11)
- Ernest "Big" Crawford – bass (tracks 1–9 & 12)
- Jimmy Rogers – guitar (tracks 10 & 11)
- Elgin Evans – drums (tracks 10 & 11)
