= Joy (Mick Jagger song) =

Song by Mick Jagger

Promotional single by Mick Jagger

from the album Goddess in the Doorway
- Released: 19 November 2001
- Genre: Rock and roll
- Length: 4:41
- Label: Virgin
- Songwriter(s): Mick Jagger
- Producer(s): Mick Jagger; Matt Clifford

"Joy" is a song by English singer-songwriter Mick Jagger. It was released as a track on his fourth solo album, Goddess in the Doorway (2001). Rolling Stone called it "a rocking, gospel-tinged collaboration with Bono of U2" - featuring Pete Townshend on guitar. "Joy" was one of three tracks from Goddess in the Doorway to be featured on Jagger's greatest hits album, The Very Best of Mick Jagger.
