= The Real Folk Blues (Muddy Waters album) =

Compilation album by Muddy Waters
- Released: January 1966
- Recorded: September 1947 – 1964 in Chicago, Illinois
- Genres: Chicago blues, folk blues
- Length: 34:02
- Label: Chess
- Producer: Marshall Chess

Muddy Waters chronology
| The Best of Muddy Waters (1957) | The Real Folk Blues (1966) | Muddy, Brass & the Blues (1966) |

Professional ratings
Review scores
| Source | Rating |
|---|---|
| AllMusic | 4.5/5 stars |
| Record Mirror | 4/5 stars |

The Real Folk Blues is a compilation album of Muddy Waters recordings, released on the Chess record label in January 1966. The album was the first release of The Real Folk Blues series and has since been re-released in multiple formats. The album features some of Waters' first recordings.

== Artwork and packaging ==
The cover art photography and design on The Real Folk Blues was done by Don S. Bronstein and the sleeve notes for the original album were done by Willie Dixon. On a reissue of the album, new liner notes were authored by Cary Baker.

== Recording background ==
Muddy Waters started out recording for Aristocrat Records in 1947, a precursor of Chess Records. These early recordings feature him alongside Ernest "Big" Crawford. Later, when Leonard and Phil Chess took over the record label, Muddy used a more electric backing band featuring members such as Little Walter. PopMatters Marshall Bowden explained, "Muddy's last R&B chart hit with Chess came in 1958 ... he was no longer a popular recording artist. Chess looked about for a way to promote the singer to a young generation, and hit upon the folk music craze that was taking place. Muddy Waters, Folk Singer was released in 1964, and in 1966 The Real Folk Blues came out. The tracks included were a collection of Muddy's work, including his very first single for Aristocrat, "Gypsy Woman" (1947) as well as things he had recorded in the early '60s. This meant that some of the songs came from the deep rural blues tradition (the "folk" aspect) while others were much more urban, demonstrating the influential sound that Waters had been spreading around since his arrival in Chicago".

== Awards ==
In 2017, the album was inducted in to the Blues Hall of Fame in the category of 'Classics of Blues Recordings – Album'.

== Track listing ==
All tracks written by Muddy Waters, except when indicated.

1. "Mannish Boy" (Muddy Waters, Mel London, Ellas McDaniel) – 2:54
2. "Screamin' & Cryin'" – 3:04
3. "Just to Be with You" (Bernard Roth) – 3:13
4. "Walkin' Thru the Park" – 2:40
5. "Walkin' Blues" (Robert Johnson) – 2:54
6. "Canary Bird" – 2:42
7. "Same Thing" (Dixon) – 2:37
8. "Gypsy Woman" – 2:31
9. "Rollin' and Tumblin'" – 2:57
10. "Forty Days and Forty Nights" (Roth) – 2:50
11. "Little Geneva" – 2:45
12. "You Can't Lose What You Ain't Never Had" – 2:55

== Personnel ==
- Muddy Waters – vocals, guitar
- Pat Hare – guitar
- Sammy Lawhorn – guitar
- James "Pee Wee" Madison – guitar
- Jimmy Rogers – guitar
- Baby Face Leroy Foster – guitar
- Johnny Jones – piano
- Otis Spann – piano
- Sunnyland Slim – piano
- Little Walter – harmonica
- Junior Wells – harmonica on "Mannish Boy"
- Big Crawford – bass
- Willie Dixon – bass
- Ransom Knowling – bass
- Andrew Stephenson – bass
- Francis Clay – drums
- Odie Payne – drums
- Fred Below – drums
