= Sharp Dressed Simple Man Tour =

2023–24 concert tour by Lynyrd Skynyrd and ZZ Top

- Tour by Lynyrd Skynyrd and ZZ Top
- Location: North America
- Start date: July 21, 2023
- End date: September 22, 2024
- No. of shows: 48
Lynyrd Skynyrd tour chronology
The Last of the Street Survivors Farewell Tour/Big Wheels Keep On Turnin' Tour (2018–23)	Sharp Dressed Simple Man Tour (2023–24)	50th Anniversary Tour (2025)
ZZ Top tour chronology
Tonnage Tour (2017-18)	Sharp Dressed Simple Man Tour (2023–24)

The Sharp Dressed Simple Man Tour was a co-headlining North American concert tour featuring legendary Southern rock band Lynyrd Skynyrd and blues-rock icons ZZ Top. The tour was named after a combination of both bands' iconic songs — Lynyrd Skynyrd's "Simple Man" and ZZ Top's "Sharp Dressed Man". The tour kicked off in the summer of 2023 and brought together the two rock bands in concerts throughout the United States.

== Background ==
Announced in December 2022, the tour was conceived as a celebration of both bands' lasting legacies in rock music. ZZ Top, known for their Texas blues-infused rock sound and signature beards, joined forces with Lynyrd Skynyrd.

This marked the first tour following the death of Gary Rossington, the last remaining original member; his memory was honored throughout the tour.

== Tour dates ==
Date	City	Country	Venue	Opening act(s)	Attendance
2023
July 21, 2023	West Palm Beach	United States	iTHINK Financial Amphitheatre	Uncle Kracker	
July 23, 2023	Alpharetta	United States	Ameris Bank Amphitheatre	Uncle Kracker	
July 28, 2023	Rogers	United States	Walmart AMP	Uncle Kracker	
July 29, 2023	Fort Worth	United States	Dickies Arena	Uncle Kracker	
July 30, 2023	Houston	United States	Cynthia Woods Mitchell Pavilion	Uncle Kracker	
August 7, 2023	Denver	United States	Fiddler's Green Amphitheatre	Uncle Kracker	
August 10, 2023	Mountain View	United States	Shoreline Amphitheatre	Uncle Kracker	
August 11, 2023	Wheatland	United States	Toyota Amphitheatre	Uncle Kracker	
August 13, 2023	Phoenix	United States	Ak-Chin Pavilion	Uncle Kracker	
August 17, 2023	Maryland Heights	United States	Hollywood Casino Amphitheatre	Uncle Kracker	
August 19, 2023	Tinley Park	United States	Credit Union 1 Amphitheatre	Uncle Kracker	
August 20, 2023	Noblesville	United States	Ruoff Music Center	Uncle Kracker	
August 25, 2023	Cincinnati	United States	Riverbend Music Center	Uncle Kracker	
August 26, 2023	Clarkston	United States	Pine Knob Music Theatre	Uncle Kracker	
August 27, 2023	Toronto	Canada	Budweiser Stage	Uncle Kracker	
September 1, 2023	Charlotte	United States	PNC Music Pavilion	Uncle Kracker	
September 2, 2023	Columbia	United States	Merriweather Post Pavilion	Uncle Kracker	
September 3, 2023	Burgettstown	United States	The Pavilion at Star Lake	Uncle Kracker	
September 8, 2023	Saratoga Springs	United States	Saratoga Performing Arts Center	Uncle Kracker	
September 9, 2023	Hershey	United States	Hersheypark Stadium	Uncle Kracker	
September 10, 2023	Holmdel	United States	PNC Bank Arts Center	Uncle Kracker	
September 15, 2023	Raleigh	United States	Coastal Credit Union Music Park at Walnut Creek	Uncle Kracker	
September 16, 2023	Ocean City	United States	Ocean Stage (Note: This concert was part of OC Bike Fest)	Uncle Kracker	
September 17, 2023	Camden	United States	Freedom Mortgage Pavilion	Uncle Kracker	
2024
March 8, 2024	Savannah	United States	Enmarket Arena	Black Stone Cherry	
March 9, 2024	Estero	United States	Hertz Arena	Black Stone Cherry	
March 10, 2024	Hollywood	United States	Hard Rock Live		
March 14, 2024	Greenville	United States	Bon Secours Wellness Arena	Black Stone Cherry	
March 15, 2024	Knoxville	United States	Thompson-Boling Arena	Black Stone Cherry	
March 16, 2024	Columbia	United States	Colonial Life Arena	Black Stone Cherry	
March 22, 2024	Bossier City	United States	Brookshire Grocery Arena	Black Stone Cherry	
March 23, 2024	Southhaven	United States	Landers Center	Black Stone Cherry	
March 24, 2024	Macon	United States	Atrium Health Amphitheater	Black Stone Cherry	
March 28, 2024	Lexington	United States	Rupp Arena	Black Stone Cherry	
March 29, 2024	Greensboro	United States	Greensboro Coliseum	Black Stone Cherry	
March 30, 2024	Charleston	United States	Charleston Coliseum	Black Stone Cherry	
April 4, 2024	Biloxi	United States	Mississippi Coast Coliseum	Black Stone Cherry	
April 5, 2024	Tallahassee	United States	Donald L. Tucker Civic Center	Black Stone Cherry	
April 6, 2024	Huntsville	United States	Propst Arena	Black Stone Cherry	
April 12, 2024	Evansville	United States	Ford Center	Black Stone Cherry	
April 13, 2024	Moline	United States	Vibrant Arena	Black Stone Cherry	
April 14, 2024	Green Bay	United States	Resch Center	Black Stone Cherry	
April 18, 2024	North Little Rock	United States	Simmons Bank Arena	Black Stone Cherry	
April 19, 2024	Lafayette	United States	Cajundome	Black Stone Cherry	
April 20, 2024	Corpus Christi	United States	American Bank Center	Black Stone Cherry	
August 9, 2024	Mount Pleasant	United States	Soaring Eagle Casino		
August 10, 2024	North Lawrence	United States	Clay's Park Resort (Note: This concert was part of Neon Nights)		
August 15, 2024	Syracuse	United States	Empower Federal Credit Union Amphitheater	Outlaws	
August 16, 2024	Bethel	United States	Bethel Woods Center for the Arts	Outlaws	
August 17, 2024	Mansfield	United States	Xfinity Center	Outlaws	
August 22, 2024	Wantagh	United States	Northwell Health at Jones Beach Theater	Outlaws	
August 23, 2024	Gilford	United States	BankNH Pavilion	Outlaws	
August 24, 2024	Hartford	United States	Xfinity Theatre	Outlaws	
September 5, 2024	Alpharetta	United States	Ameris Bank Amphitheatre	Outlaws	
September 7, 2024	Virginia Beach	United States	Veterans United Home Loans Amphitheater	Outlaws	
September 8, 2024	Bristow	United States	Jiffy Lube Live	Outlaws	
September 12, 2024	Darien Center	United States	Darien Lake Performing Arts Center	Outlaws	
September 13, 2024	Clarkston	United States	Pine Knob Music Theatre	Outlaws	
September 14, 2024	Noblesville	United States	Ruoff Music Center	Outlaws	
September 19, 2024	Concord	United States	Toyota Pavilion at Concord	Outlaws	
September 21, 2024	Auburn	United States	White River Amphitheatre	Outlaws	
September 22, 2024	Ridgefield	United States	RV Inn Style Resorts Amphitheater	Outlaws	
September 26, 2024	West Valley City	United States	Utah First Credit Union Amphitheatre (Note: Lynyrd Skynyrd did not show up due to Johnny Van Zant's daughter having surgery)	Outlaws	
September 27, 2024	Loveland	United States	Blue Arena (Note: Lynyrd Skynyrd did not show up due to Johnny Van Zant's daughter having surgery)	Outlaws	
September 28, 2024	Colorado Springs	United States	Ford Amphitheater (Note: Lynyrd Skynyrd did not show up due to Johnny Van Zant's daughter having surgery)	Outlaws	

== Personnel ==
Lynyrd Skynyrd:

- Johnny Van Zant – lead vocals
- Rickey Medlocke – guitar, backing vocals
- Damon Johnson – guitar
- Michael Cartellone – drums
- Peter Keys – keyboards
- Keith Christopher – bass

ZZ Top:

- Billy Gibbons – guitar, lead vocals
- Frank Beard – drums, percussion
- Elwood Francis – bass, backing vocals
