= Gotta Get a Grip (song) =

2017 single by Mick Jagger

"Gotta Get a Grip" / "England Lost"

Single by Mick Jagger
- Released: 2017
- Recorded: 2017
- Studio: Electric Lady Studios, New York
- Genre: Rock
- Length: 4:05
- Label: Interscope / Polydor
- Songwriters: Mick Jagger, Matt Clifford
- Producers: Matt Clifford, Mick Jagger

Mick Jagger singles chronology
"Old Habits Die Hard" (2004)	"Gotta Get a Grip" / "England Lost" (2017)	"Eazy Sleazy" (2021)

"Gotta Get a Grip" / "England Lost" is a double A-side single by the English singer-songwriter and Rolling Stones frontman, Mick Jagger. The single was announced and subsequently released on 27 July 2017 along with accompanying music videos, one day after the singer turned 74. According to Jagger, the songs were written in April 2017 as a response to what he called the "confusion and frustration with the times we live in." According to the same statement by Jagger, which was released on the same day, the song describes the "anxiety, unknowability of the changing political situation" in a post-Brexit UK. The songs are the first solo-material that Jagger has released since Goddess In the Doorway was released in 2001. A digital "Reimagined" EP was also released, including a longer version of "England Lost", featuring Skepta, and remixes of "Gotta Get a Grip" by Seeb, Kevin Parker of Tame Impala, Alok and producer Matt Clifford.

== Writing ==
In a statement coinciding with the release of "Gotta Get a Grip" and "England Lost", Jagger stated "It's always refreshing to get creative in a different fashion and I feel a slight throwback to a time when you could be a bit more free and easy by recording on the hoof and putting it out there immediately". Jagger also stated that he did not wait to release these songs as part of an album due to wanting to release the two songs as soon as possible.

The Los Angeles Times stated that the production of the songs were "resolutely modern," using "programmed drums and clanging guitar noise."

== Personnel ==
- Mick Jagger – guitar, vocals, harmonica
- Charlie Watts – drums
- Matt Clifford - keyboards
- Ronnie Wood – electric guitar

== Reception ==
The song has been called "politically charged" by multiple publications, including Rolling Stone, Los Angeles Times and NME. Uncut stated that "Gotta Get a Grip" has a "slower groove" than "England Lost", saying that it is powered by a "mighty, rolling riff" similar to the riff in the Stones' song, "Start Me Up". The single reached number 2 on Billboard's Singles Sales chart.

== Charts ==
Chart (2017) "Gotta Get a Grip"	Peak position
France (SNEP)	49
Mexico Ingles Airplay (Billboard)	30
Hot Singles Sales (Billboard)	2

Chart (2017) "England Lost"	Peak position
France (SNEP)	114
Mexico Ingles Airplay (Billboard)	38
Twitter Top Tracks (Billboard)	44
