= Tonnage Tour =

2017–18 concert tour by ZZ Top

- Tour by ZZ Top
- Location: North America, Europe
- Associated album: Live! Greatest Hits from Around the World
- Start date: February 18, 2017
- End date: September 2, 2018
- Legs: 6
- No. of shows: 154
- Box office: US$26.2 million

ZZ Top concert chronology
- Grooves & Gravy Tour (2015); Tonnage Tour (2017-18); Sharp Dressed Simple Man Tour (2023-24)

The Tonnage Tour was a worldwide concert tour by American rock band ZZ Top in support of their 2016 live album Live! Greatest Hits from Around the World. The tour consisted of six legs that alternated between indoor and outdoor shows in the US, along with arenas and festivals in Europe. Much like their recent tours, the Tonnage Tour featured a stripped-down, intimate stage design. The band played a mixture of older and newer material during their set, which included songs from their latest studio album La Futura (2012).

Kevin Kinder from the Fayetteville Flyer thought the concert was "a highly choreographed concert, both subtly in the way Gibbons and bassist Dusty Hill swayed in unison during several moments, and more overtly in the way the show was paced." The last eighteen dates in 2017 were cancelled to due Dusty Hill having an ailment.

After 90 concerts in 2017, the Tonnage Tour grossed US$11.2 million, making it one of the top 200 grossing tours of the year. For the first two legs alone, the tour grossed $6.3 million with 166,943 tickets sold. After the fourth leg in the US, the tour's schedule was expanded to feature a co-headlining leg with John Fogerty, which was branded as "Blues & Bayous", and grossed $9 million with 359,553 tickets sold. At its conclusion, the Tonnage Tour had sold 1,083,675 tickets – with 154 shows – for a total gross of $26.2 million.

== Personnel ==
- Billy Gibbons - Guitar, Vocals
- Dusty Hill - Bass, Vocals
- Frank Beard - Drums, Percussion

== Setlist ==
- setlist from the Salt Lake City, Utah concert

1. Got Me Under Pressure
2. Waitin' For The Bus
3. Jesus Just Left Chicago
4. Gimme All Your Lovin'
5. Pincushion
6. I'm Bad, I'm Nationwide
7. I Gotsta Get Paid
8. Foxy Lady (The Jimi Hendrix Experience cover)
9. My Head's in Mississippi
10. Catfish Blues (Robert Petway cover)
11. Sixteen Tons (Tennessee Ernie Ford cover)
12. Act Naturally (Buck Owens cover)*featuring Francis Elwood
13. Just Got Paid
14. Sharp Dressed Man
15. Legs
encore
16. La Grange/BBQ/Sloppy Drunk Jam
17. Tush
second encore
18. Jailhouse Rock (Elvis Presley cover)

== Tour dates ==
List of concerts, showing date, city, country, venue, tickets sold, number of available tickets and amount of gross revenue
Date	City	Country	Venue	Opening Act(s)	Attendance	Revenue
Leg 1: United States
February 18, 2017	Mobile	United States	Saenger Theatre	Austin Hanks	1,851 / 1,900	$158,282
February 19, 2017	Greenville	United States	Peace Center	Austin Hanks	—	—
February 21, 2017	Columbia	United States	Township Auditorium	Austin Hanks	—	—
February 22, 2017	Nashville	United States	Ryman Auditorium	Austin Hanks	—	—
February 24, 2017	Louisville	United States	Louisville Palace	Austin Hanks	—	—
February 25, 2017	Northfield	United States	Hard Rock Live	Austin Hanks	—	—
February 26, 2017	Schenectady	United States	Proctor's Theatre	Austin Hanks	—	—
February 28, 2017	Jim Thorpe	United States	Penn's Peak	Austin Hanks	—	—
March 1, 2017	New York City	United States	Beacon Theatre	Austin Hanks	2,726 / 2,726	$207,755
March 3, 2017	Atlantic City	United States	Caesars Atlantic City	Austin Hanks	1,606 / 1,606	$155,725
March 4, 2017	Shippensburg	United States	Shippensburg University	Austin Hanks	—	—
March 5, 2017	Oxon Hill	United States	MGM National Harbor	Austin Hanks	—	—
March 7, 2017	Hiawassee	United States	Anderson Music Hall	Austin Hanks	—	—
March 8, 2017	Memphis	United States	Orpheum Theatre	Austin Hanks	—	—
March 10, 2017	Tulsa	United States	Paradise Cove	Austin Hanks	—	—
March 11, 2017	Lake Charles	United States	Golden Nugget Lake Charles	Austin Hanks	—	—
March 14, 2017	Macon	United States	Macon City Auditorium	Austin Hanks	—	—
March 16, 2017	Estero	United States	Germain Arena	Edgar Winter, Austin Hanks	—	—
March 17, 2017	Miami Beach	United States	Miami Beach Convention Center	Austin Hanks	—	—
March 18, 2017	Orlando	United States	SeaWorld Orlando	Austin Hanks	—	—
March 21, 2017	Houston	United States	NRG Stadium		59,142 / 80,000	—
Leg 2: North America
May 12, 2017	Amarillo	United States	Amarillo Civic Center	Austin Hanks	—	—
May 13, 2017	Wichita Falls	United States	Wichita Falls Memorial Auditorium	Austin Hanks	—	—
May 14, 2017	Midland	United States	Midland County Horseshoe Arena	Austin Hanks	2,282 / 3,196	$126,508
May 16, 2017	San Antonio	United States	Majestic Theatre	Austin Hanks	—	—
May 18, 2017	Biloxi	United States	Beau Rivage	Austin Hanks	—	—
May 19, 2017	Biloxi	United States	Beau Rivage	Austin Hanks	—	—
May 20, 2017	Belton	United States	Bell County Expo Center	Austin Hanks	—	—
May 22, 2017	San Angelo	United States	Foster Communications Coliseum	Austin Hanks	—	—
May 23, 2017	Hidalgo	United States	State Farm Arena	Austin Hanks	—	—
May 24, 2017	Corpus Christi	United States	Selena Auditorium	Austin Hanks	1,849 / 2,610	$113,473
May 26, 2017	Little Rock	United States	Robinson Performance Hall	Austin Hanks	—	—
May 27, 2017	Park City	United States	Hartman Arena	Austin Hanks	—	—
May 28, 2017	Springfield	United States	Juanita K. Hammons Hall	Austin Hanks	2,144 / 2,241	$139,145
May 30, 2017	Fort Wayne	United States	Foellinger Theatre	Austin Hanks	—	—
June 1, 2017	Interlochen	United States	Interlochen Center for the Arts	Austin Hanks	—	—
June 2, 2017	Windsor	Canada	Caesars Windsor		4,478 / 4,934	$259,061
June 3, 2017	Rama	Canada	Casino Rama		—	—
June 6, 2017	Lewiston	United States	Artpark	Austin Hanks	—	—
June 7, 2017	Cincinnati	United States	PNC Pavilion	Austin Hanks	—	—
June 9, 2017	Rogers	United States	Walmart Arkansas Music Pavilion	Austin Hanks	—	—
June 10, 2017	Frisco	United States	Toyota Stadium	Thom Shepherd	—	—
Leg 3: Europe
July 6, 2017	Albi	France	Festival Pause Gitare	Renaud, Féfé	—	—
July 7, 2017	Tours	France	Tours Speedway		—	—
July 8, 2017	Sierre	Switzerland	Plaine de Bellevue	Van Wilks, Eric Slim Zahl and the South West Swingers	—	—
July 9, 2017	Sankt Goarshausen	Germany	Freilichtbühne Loreley	The Red Devils	—	—
July 11, 2017	Paris	France	Zénith Paris	The Red Devils	—	—
July 12, 2017	Monchengladbach	Germany	Warsteiner HockeyPark	The Red Devils	—	—
July 14, 2017	Esch-sur-Alzette	Luxembourg	Rockhal	The Red Devils	—	—
July 15, 2017	Peer	Belgium	Deusterstraat	The Red Devils, Blind Boys of Alabama	—	—
July 16, 2017	Petite-Forêt	France	Arènes du Hainaut	Eric Sardinas, Truckers	—	—
July 18, 2017	Berlin	Germany	Spandau Citadel	The Red Devils	—	—
July 19, 2017	Plzeň	Czech Republic	Home Monitoring Aréna	The Red Devils	—	—
July 21, 2017	Lörrach	Germany	Marktplatz Lörrach	The Red Devils	—	—
July 22, 2017	Rosenheim	Germany	Mangfallpark Süd	The Red Devils	—	—
July 23, 2017	Halle	Germany	Gerry Weber Stadion	The Red Devils	—	—
July 25, 2017	Manchester	England	O2 Apollo Manchester	The Red Devils	—	—
July 26, 2017	Glasgow	Scotland	O2 Academy Glasgow	The Red Devils	—	—
July 28, 2017	Dublin	Ireland	3Arena	The Red Devils	—	—
July 30, 2017	Maidstone	England	Mote Park	UFO, Supersonic Blues Machine	—	—
Leg 3: North America
August 24, 2017	Vancouver	Canada	Pacific National Exhibition		—	—
August 25, 2017	Woodinville	United States	Chateau Ste. Michelle	The Doobie Brothers	4,250 / 4,300	$384,446
August 26, 2017	Goldendale	United States	Maryhill Winery	The Doobie Brothers	4,359 / 4,452	$369,309
August 27, 2017	Eugene	United States	Cuthbert Amphitheater	The Doobie Brothers	—	—
August 29, 2017	Saratoga	United States	Mountain Winery	The Doobie Brothers	—	—
August 31, 2017	Salt Lake City	United States	Red Butte Garden and Arboretum	Jordan Matthew Young	—	—
September 1, 2017	Pueblo	United States	Southwest Motors Events Center		—	—
September 3, 2017	Norfolk	United States	DeVent Center	Robert Randolph and the Family Band	—	—
September 6, 2017	El Paso	United States	Sun Bowl		39,780 / 43,123	$3,087,980
September 8, 2017	San Antonio	United States	Alamodome		38,490 / 41,387	$3,859,017
September 9, 2017	Irving	United States	Toyota Music Factory	Alejandro Escovedo	3,481 / 4,161	$214,725
September 10, 2017	Sugar Land	United States	Smart Financial Centre	Contagious	3,456 / 5,104	$246,309
September 12, 2017	Champaign	United States	Virginia Theatre		—	—
September 13, 2017	Milwaukee	United States	Riverside Theater		—	—
September 15, 2017	Fargo	United States	Scheels Arena	Tim Montana	—	—
September 16, 2017	Prior Lake	United States	Mystic Lake Casino Hotel		1,910 / 1,910	$156,292
September 17, 2017	Des Moines	United States	Civic Center of Greater Des Moines	Kris Lager Band	1,947 / 2,639	$147,887
September 19, 2017	Davenport	United States	Adler Theatre	Kris Lager Band	1,657 / 2,187	$133,529
September 21, 2017	Indianapolis	United States	Clowes Memorial Hall	The Summit	1,676 / 1,985	$149,207
September 22, 2017	New Buffalo	United States	Four Winds New Buffalo		—	—
September 23, 2017	Saginaw	United States	Huntington Event Park	The Summit	—	—
September 24, 2017	Huber Heights	United States	Rose Music Center	The Summit, Black Stone Cherry	—	—
September 27, 2017	Paducah	United States	Carson Center	The Summit	—	—
September 29, 2017	El Dorado	United States	Murphy Amphitheater	X Ambassadors, Robert Randolph and the Family Band	—	—
September 30, 2017	Maryland Heights	United States	Hollywood Casino Amphitheatre	Collective Soul, Andrew Hagar	—	—
October 1, 2017	Grand Rapids	United States	DeVos Performance Hall	The Summit	1,894 / 2,214	$136,982
October 3, 2017	Columbus	United States	Palace Theatre	The Summit	—	—
October 5, 2017	Wilmington	United States	Wilson Center		—	—
October 6, 2017	Cherokee	United States	Harrah's Cherokee		2,458 / 3,037	$219,940
October 7, 2017	Alpharetta	United States	Verizon Amphitheatre	Midland, Cracker	—	—
Leg 4: United States
April 18, 2018	El Paso	United States	Abraham Chavez Theatre		—	—
April 20, 2018	Las Vegas	United States	The Venetian Las Vegas		—	—
April 21, 2018	Las Vegas	United States	The Venetian Las Vegas		—	—
April 22, 2018	Anaheim	United States	House of Blues	Mike Eldred Trio	—	—
April 25, 2018	Las Vegas	United States	The Venetian Las Vegas		—	—
April 27, 2018	Las Vegas	United States	The Venetian Las Vegas		—	—
April 28, 2018	Las Vegas	United States	The Venetian Las Vegas		—	—
May 17, 2018	Tulsa	United States	Paradise Cove		—	—
May 20, 2018	New Orleans	United States	Saenger Theatre	Tim Montana	—	—
May 23, 2018	Norfolk	United States	Chartway Arena	Anthony Rosano and the Conqueroos	—	—
Leg 5: United States ("Blues & Bayous")
May 25, 2018	Atlantic City	United States	Borgata Hotel Casino & Spa	John Fogerty	—	—
May 26, 2018	Holmdel	United States	PNC Bank Arts Center	John Fogerty	—	—
May 27, 2018	Uncasville	United States	Mohegan Sun Arena	John Fogerty	6,664 / 6,664	$441,536
May 29, 2018	Vienna	United States	Filene Center	John Fogerty	—	—
May 30, 2018	Vienna	United States	Filene Center	John Fogerty	—	—
June 1, 2018	Pensacola	United States	Pensacola Bay Center	John Fogerty	—	—
June 2, 2018	Clearwater	United States	Coachman Park	John Fogerty	—	—
June 3, 2018	West Palm Beach	United States	Coral Sky Amphitheatre	John Fogerty	—	—
June 5, 2018	St. Augustine	United States	St. Augustine Amphitheatre	John Fogerty	—	—
June 6, 2018	Atlanta	United States	Delta Classic Chastain Park Amphitheater	John Fogerty	—	—
June 8, 2018	Thackerville	United States	WinStar World Casino		—	—
June 9, 2018	Austin	United States	Luedecke Arena	The Badwater Boys	—	—
June 10, 2018	Oklahoma City	United States	Oklahoma City Zoo and Botanical Garden	John Fogerty	—	—
June 12, 2018	Highland Park	United States	Ravinia Pavilion	John Fogerty	—	—
June 13, 2018	Noblesville	United States	Ruoff Home Mortgage Music Center	John Fogerty	—	—
June 14, 2018	Cincinnati	United States	Riverbend Music Center	John Fogerty	—	—
June 16, 2018	Southaven	United States	BankPlus Amphitheater	John Fogerty	—	—
June 17, 2018	Maryland Heights	United States	Hollywood Casino Amphitheatre	John Fogerty	—	—
June 19, 2018	Youngstown	United States	Covelli Centre	John Fogerty	—	—
June 20, 2018	Wantagh	United States	Jones Beach Theater	John Fogerty	—	—
June 22, 2018	Gilford	United States	Bank of New Hampshire Pavilion	John Fogerty, Ryan Kinder	6,074 / 7,615	$372,589
June 23, 2018	Canandaigua	United States	Marvin Sands Performing Arts Center	John Fogerty	—	—
June 24, 2018	Camden	United States	BB&T Pavilion	John Fogerty	—	—
June 26, 2018	Mount Pleasant	United States	Soaring Eagle Casino & Resort	John Fogerty	—	—
June 27, 2018	Clarkston	United States	DTE Energy Music Theatre	John Fogerty	—	—
June 29, 2018	Welch	United States	Treasure Island Resort & Casino	John Fogerty	—	—
June 30, 2018	Fort Dodge	United States	Harlan Rogers Sports Complex	Wild Ambition	—	—
July 1, 2018	Quapaw	United States	Downstream Casino Resort		—	—
Leg 6: North America
July 25, 2018	Paso Robles	United States	Paso Robles Event Center	George Thorogood	—	—
July 26, 2018	Sacramento	United States	Papa Murphy's Park	George Thorogood	—	—
July 28, 2018	Hillsboro	United States	Washington County Fair		—	—
July 29, 2018	Wenatchee	United States	Town Toyota Center	Tim Montana	—	—
July 30, 2018	Woodinville	United States	Chateau Ste. Michelle	Tim Montana	—	—
August 1, 2018	Boise	United States	Idaho Botanical Garden	Tim Montana	—	—
August 3, 2018	Billings	United States	Downtown Billings	Carolyn Wonderland, Willy G	—	—
August 4, 2018	Sandpoint	United States	War Memorial Field	Tim Montana	—	—
August 6, 2018	Cheyenne	United States	Cheyenne Civic Center	Tim Montana	—	—
August 7, 2018	Lincoln	United States	Pinewood Bowl Theater	Tim Montana	—	—
August 10, 2018	Hamburg	United States	Erie County Fairgrounds		—	—
August 11, 2018	Toronto	Canada	Budweiser Stage	38 Special, Blackfoot	—	—
August 13, 2018	Saint John	Canada	Harbour Station	The Damn Truth	4,619 / 5,479	$278,792
August 14, 2018	Summerside	Canada	Consolidated Credit Union Place	The Damn Truth	4,369 / 4,369	$259,557
August 16, 2018	Quebec City	Canada	Videotron Centre	Steve Hill	—	—
August 17, 2018	Laval	Canada	Place Bell	The Damn Truth	5,136 / 5,136	$307,308
August 18, 2018	Rama	Canada	Casino Rama		—	—
August 21, 2018	Roanoke	United States	Berglund Center	The Summit	1,371 / 1,946	$112,951
August 22, 2018	Glen Allen	United States	Servpro Richmond Pavilion		—	—
August 24, 2018	Sunbury	United States	Spyglass Ridge Winery	Scott Pemberton	—	—
August 25, 2018	Oneonta	United States	6th Ward Booster Club Field	The Summit	—	—
August 26, 2018	Webster	United States	Indian Ranch		—	—
August 28, 2018	Hyannis	United States	Cape Cod Melody Tent		—	—
August 30, 2018	Portland	United States	Maine State Pier	Murcielago	—	—
September 1, 2018	Syracuse	United States	Chevy Court		33,875 / 35,000	—
September 2, 2018	Virginia Beach	United States	Virginia Beach Oceanfront	Ana Popović, The Josephines	—	—
