= Muddy, Brass & the Blues =

Studio album by Muddy Waters
- Released: 26 October 1966
- Recorded: June 22 & 23, 1966
- Studios: Ter Mar, Chicago, IL
- Genre: Blues
- Length: 30:51
- Labels: Chess; LP 1507
- Producers: Gene Barge, Ralph Bass

Muddy Waters chronology
The Real Folk Blues (1966)	Muddy, Brass & the Blues (1966)	More Real Folk Blues (1967)

Professional ratings
Review scores
Source	Rating
AllMusic	2.5/5 stars
The Encyclopedia of Popular Music	2/5 stars
MusicHound Rock: The Essential Album Guide	2/5 stars
The Rolling Stone Album Guide	1/5 stars

Muddy, Brass & the Blues, sometimes referred to as Brass and the Blues, is an album by the blues musician Muddy Waters, released by Chess Records in 1966.

== Critical reception ==
AllMusic wrote: "Stripped of his guitar once again (the cover photo notwithstanding), Waters proved what a great R&B singer he was—there are moments on this album where he almost crosses over into Otis Redding territory."

== Track listing ==
1. "Corine, Corina" (Bob Miller) – 3:38
2. "Piney Brown Blues" (Pete Johnson, Big Joe Turner) – 3:16
3. "Black Night" (Jessie Mae Robinson) – 3:22
4. "Trouble in Mind" (Richard M. Jones) – 2:51
5. "Going Back to Memphis" (Will Shade) – 2:40
6. "Betty and Dupree" (Chuck Willis) – 3:04
7. "Sweet Little Angel" (Robert Nighthawk) – 3:33
8. "Take My Advice" (Jesse Anderson, Gene Barge) – 2:56
9. "Trouble" – 2:26
10. "Hard Loser" (McKinley Morganfield) – 3:05

== Personnel ==
- Muddy Waters – vocals, guitar
- James Cotton – harmonica
- Otis Spann – piano
- James ‘Pee Wee’ Madison, Sam Lawhorn – guitar
- Calvin Jones – bass
- Willie Smith – drums
- Gene Barge – tenor saxophone
- Unknown musicians – alto saxophone, baritone saxophone, trumpet, trombone, organ

== Charts ==
Chart performance for Muddy, Brass & the Blues
Chart (2026)	Peak position
Croatian International Albums (HDU)	40
