= Let's Work (Mick Jagger song) =

1987 single by Mick Jagger

Single by Mick Jagger

from the album Primitive Cool
- Released: 24 August 1987
- Genre: Rock and roll
- Length: 4:50
- Label: CBS
- Songwriters: Mick Jagger; David A. Stewart
- Producers: Mick Jagger; David A. Stewart

Mick Jagger singles chronology
"Hard Woman" (1985)	"Let's Work" (1987)	"Throwaway" (1987)

"Let's Work" is the lead single from Mick Jagger's second solo studio album, Primitive Cool. Despite high expectations, it failed to reach the popularity of earlier Jagger singles such as "Just Another Night.", hitting No. 39 on the Billboard Hot 100. The music video for the song featured Jagger running down a street with several collections of workers.

It was the only track from Primitive Cool included on Jagger's greatest hits album, The Very Best of Mick Jagger (2007).

== Charts ==
Chart (1987)	Peak position
Australia (Kent Music Report)	24
Italy Airplay (Music & Media)	9
UK Top 100 Singles	31
US Billboard Hot 100	39
US Mainstream Rock Tracks	7
US Hot Dance/Club Play	32
US Hot Dance Music/Maxi-Singles Sales	32
