= The Devil Is a Woman =

The Devil Is a Woman may refer to:

- The Devil Is a Woman (1935 film), an American romance film directed by Josef von Sternberg
- The Devil Is a Woman (1950 film), a Mexican drama film directed by Tito Davison
- The Devil Is a Woman (1974 film), a British-Italian drama film directed by Damiano Damiani

== See also ==
- Devil Woman (disambiguation)
- A Devil of a Woman, a 1951 Austrian drama film directed by Wolfgang Liebeneiner
