= The Real Folk Blues (Sonny Boy Williamson II album) =

Compilation album by Sonny Boy Williamson
- Released: January 1966
- Recorded: September 1, 1957 – April 30, 1964
- Studio: Chicago
- Genre: Blues
- Length: 31:41
- Label: Chess
- Producer: Marshall Chess

Sonny Boy Williamson chronology
Sonny Boy Williamson and Memphis Slim (1964)	The Real Folk Blues (1966)	Sonny Boy Williamson and the Yardbirds (1966)

The Real Folk Blues is an album by blues musician Sonny Boy Williamson II compiling songs recorded in Chicago between 1957 and 1964. Released by Chess Records in 1966, the album contains mostly previously unissued material, including "Checkin' Up on My Baby" and "Bring It On Home", which have been called "some of the most accomplished masterpieces of postwar blues".

== Reception ==
Professional ratings
Review scores
Source	Rating
AllMusic	4.5/5 stars

AllMusic reviewer Stephen Cook commented: "Part of Chess' long line of introductory blues compilations, Sonny Boy Williamson's Real Folk Blues keeps up the high standard with another solid batch of classic Chicago blues. Mostly taken from his last years in the first half of the '60s, the 12 cuts here represent some of the best of Williamson's juke joint and dancefloor-friendly mix".

== Track listing ==
All compositions credited to Sonny Boy Williamson except where noted

1. "One Way Out" – 2:44
2. "Too Young to Die" – 2:52
3. "Trust My Baby" – 2:41
4. "Checkin' Up on My Baby" – 1:52
5. "Sad to Be Alone" – 2:52
6. "Got to Move" – 2:24
7. "Bring It On Home" (Willie Dixon) – 2:34
8. "Down Child" – 2:30
9. "Peach Tree" – 2:31
10. "Dissatisfied" – 2:41
11. "That's All I Want" (Dixon) – 2:13
12. "Too Old to Think" – 2:46
- recorded in Chicago on September 1, 1957 (track 10), January 30, 1960 (track 5), April 14, 1960 (track 4), June 1960 (track 9), September 15, 1960 (tracks 3 & 8), December 14, 1960 (track 2), September 8, 1961 (track 11 & 12), January 11, 1963 (tracks 6 & 7) and April 30, 1964 (track 1).

== Personnel ==
- Sonny Boy Williamson – harmonica, vocals
- Buddy Guy (track 1), Robert Lockwood Jr. (tracks 2–5, 8 & 10–12), Eddie King (track 9), Matt Murphy (track 7), Luther Tucker (tracks 2–5 & 8–12) – guitar
- Otis Spann (tracks 2–5 & 9–12) – piano
- Lafayette Leake (tracks 1, 3 & 6–8) – piano, organ
- Willie Dixon (tracks 2–5 & 8–12), Jack Meyers (track 1), Milton Rector (tracks 6 & 7) – bass
- Fred Below (tracks 1, 3–5 & 8–12), Odie Payne (track 2), Al Duncan (tracks 6 & 7) – drums
