= She's the Boss =

Studio album by Mick Jagger
- Released: 19 February 1985
- Recorded: May–November 1984
- Studios: Compass Point (Nassau, Bahamas); Power Station (New York City)
- Genres: Dance-rock; hard rock
- Length: 43:09
- Label: Columbia
- Producers: Mick Jagger; Bill Laswell; Nile Rodgers

Mick Jagger chronology
She's the Boss (1985)	Primitive Cool (1987)

Singles from She's the Boss
- 1. "Just Another Night" Released: February 1985; 2. "Lucky in Love" Released: April 1985; 3. "Hard Woman" Released: December 1985

Professional ratings
Review scores
Source	Rating
AllMusic	3/5 stars
Robert Christgau	C
Rolling Stone	4/5 stars

She's the Boss is the debut solo studio album by the English rock singer Mick Jagger, released on 19 February 1985 in the US and 4 March 1985 in the UK.

When Jagger's group the Rolling Stones signed with Columbia/CBS Records in 1983, one of the options available to them was for individual projects, and Jagger eagerly began working on She's the Boss.

== Background ==
Following the release of the Stones' 1983 album Undercover, Jagger began composing material for his first solo project. He obtained the help of various musician friends in the studio when recording began in May 1984. Contributors included Pete Townshend, Jeff Beck, Carlos Alomar, Herbie Hancock, Sly and Robbie and the Bahamas-based musicians known as Compass Point Allstars. Jagger would share production duties with Bill Laswell and Nile Rodgers.

Keith Richards, Jagger's longtime musical partner in the Rolling Stones, was not pleased that Jagger was pursuing solo work, feeling that their band should be first priority for both of them; Richards was especially upset because in 1983, Jagger had piggy-backed a three-album solo deal with Columbia onto the multi-million Stones deal without informing any of the other Stones. The increasing animosity between both musicians would publicly erupt in 1986 before they resolved their differences a few years later. In his 2010 memoir Life, Richards compared She's the Boss to Adolf Hitler's autobiographical and political manifesto Mein Kampf (1925): "Everybody had a copy, but nobody listened to it."

She's the Boss was released in February 1985, preceded by its lead song "Just Another Night" as a single. Both album and single became worldwide hits, with "Just Another Night" reaching No. 1 on the US Mainstream Rock chart and No. 12 on the US pop chart, and She's the Boss going to No. 6 in the UK and No. 13 in the US, where it went platinum.

The follow-up single "Lucky in Love" was a Top 40 US hit. The single version (which was also released on video) has been remixed considerably from the album version. The single version is 4:51 long.

The version of "Hard Woman" released as a single (with an accompanying video) is radically different from the album version. The single is titled "Hard Woman (New Version)". The video for "Hard Woman" extensively utilised a Cray X-MP supercomputer for its animation, making it one of the most expensive music videos made to that point in time. "Lonely at the Top" was recorded by the Rolling Stones in 1979 with altered lyrics and a less uplifting sound.

The success of the album – encouraged by Jagger's solo appearance at Live Aid that July and his rush-recorded duet hit cover of "Dancing in the Street" with David Bowie – influenced Jagger to record a successor, Primitive Cool, which would be released in 1987.

Although originally released by Columbia, She's the Boss was acquired and reissued by Atlantic Records in 1993, following the release of Jagger's third album, Wandering Spirit, also issued by Atlantic.

In 1986, Jamaican reggae singer Patrick Alley attempted to sue Jagger over the song "Just Another Night", which Alley claims he had recorded in 1979 and released on his 1982 album A Touch of Patrick Alley. Alley claimed that Sly Dunbar (who played drums on She's the Boss) also played on his recording. The case was cleared in 1988, with Jagger stating: "My reputation is really cleared. If you're well known, people stand up and take shots at you."

== Track listing ==
All tracks are written by Mick Jagger, with additional writers noted.

Side one
No.	Title	Writer(s)	Length
1.	"Lonely at the Top"	Keith Richards	3:47
2.	"1/2 a Loaf"		4:59
3.	"Running Out of Luck"		4:15
4.	"Turn the Girl Loose"		3:53
5.	"Hard Woman"		4:24

Side two
No.	Title	Writer(s)	Length
6.	"Just Another Night"		5:15
7.	"Lucky in Love"	Carlos Alomar	6:13
8.	"Secrets"		5:02
9.	"She's the Boss"	Alomar	5:15
Total length:			43:09

== Personnel ==
=== Musicians ===
- Mick Jagger – lead vocals, backing vocals (1, 2, 9), harmonica (3)
- Guy Fletcher – synthesizer (1, 7, 9)
- Herbie Hancock – organ (1), synthesizers (3, 7), Fairlight CMI (3, 4, 7), Yamaha DX1 (4), Hammond organ (4)
- Robert Sabino – acoustic piano (2), Prophet-5 (2, 4, 8), Roland Juno-60 (2, 8), Synclavier (2, 8)
- Jan Hammer – acoustic piano (5)
- John Bundrick – synthesizer (6)
- Ron Magness – synthesizer (6)
- Wally Badarou – Oberheim OB-Xa (7), Synclavier II (7, 9), synthesizer (9)
- Chuck Leavell – organ (7, 9)
- Jeff Beck – lead guitar (1, 3, 5, 6, 9), acoustic guitar (6), guitar (7)
- Eddie Martinez – guitar (1, 3, 9), lead guitar (2)
- Pete Townshend – guitar (1), acoustic guitar (5)
- Nile Rodgers – guitar (2, 4, 8)
- G. E. Smith – lead guitar (8)
- Bill Laswell – bass guitar (1), synthesizer (6)
- Bernard Edwards – bass guitar (2, 4, 8)
- Robbie Shakespeare – bass guitar (3, 6, 7, 9)
- Colin Hodgkinson – bass guitar (5)
- Michael Shrieve – drums (1)
- Steve Ferrone – drums (2)
- Sly Dunbar – drums (3, 6, 7, 9), Simmons drums (3, 6, 7, 9)
- Anton Fig – drums (4, 8)
- Tony Thompson – drums (5)
- Daniel Ponce – bata drum (3)
- Anton Fier – Simmons toms (6), metal percussion (9)
- Aïyb Dieng – shaker (6), water drums (7), talking drum (9)
- Ray Cooper – percussion (7), congas (9)
- Lenny Pickett – baritone saxophone (4)
- Paul Buckmaster – strings arrangement and conductor (5)
- Bernard Fowler – backing vocals (1, 7, 9)
- Fonzi Thornton – backing vocals (2)
- Alfa Anderson – ladies rap (4)

=== Production ===
- Mick Jagger – producer
- Bill Laswell and Material – producers (1, 3, 5–7, 9)
- Nile Rodgers – producer (2, 4, 8)
- Dave Jerden – engineer (1, 3, 5–7, 9)
- James Farber – engineer (2, 4, 8)
- Bill Scheniman – engineer (2, 4, 8)
- Steve Rinkoff – assistant engineer
- Sean Burrows – assistant engineer (1, 3, 5–7, 9)
- Dave Greenberg – assistant engineer (2, 4, 8)
- Eric Mohler – assistant engineer (2, 4, 8)
- Bob Ludwig – mastering at Masterdisk (New York, NY)
- Roger Trilling – administrator (1, 3, 5–7, 9)
- Budd Tunick – production manager (2, 4, 8)
- Peter Corriston – art direction, design
- Erica Lennard – photography
- Lynd Ward – woodcut
- Laurence Treil – model

== Charts ==
=== Weekly charts ===
Weekly chart performance for She's the Boss
Chart (1985)	Peak position
Australian Albums (Kent Music Report)	6
Austrian Albums (Ö3 Austria)	7
Dutch Albums (Album Top 100)	2
German Albums (Offizielle Top 100)	4
New Zealand Albums (RMNZ)	3
Norwegian Albums (VG-lista)	4
Swedish Albums (Sverigetopplistan)	6
Swiss Albums (Schweizer Hitparade)	3
UK Albums (Official Charts)	6
US Billboard 200	13

=== Year-end charts ===
1985 year-end chart performance for She's the Boss
Chart (1985)	Position
Dutch Albums (Album Top 100)	47
German Albums (Offizielle Top 100)	12
New Zealand Albums (RMNZ)	27
Swiss Albums (Schweizer Hitparade)	28
US Billboard 200	80

1986 year-end chart performance for She's the Boss
Chart (1986)	Position
New Zealand Albums (RMNZ)	24

== Certifications ==
Certifications for She's the Boss
Region	Certification	Certified units/sales
Australia (ARIA)	Platinum	70,000^{^}
Canada (Music Canada)	Platinum	100,000^{^}
Germany (BVMI)	Gold	250,000^{^}
New Zealand (RMNZ)	Platinum	15,000^{^}
Switzerland (IFPI Switzerland)	Gold	25,000^{^}
United Kingdom (BPI)	Silver	60,000^{^}
United States (RIAA)	Platinum	1,000,000^{^}
^{^} Shipments figures based on certification alone.
