= The Red Devils (blues band) =

US musical group

Background information
- Origin: Los Angeles
- Genres: Blues rock
- Years active: 1988–1994, 2017
- Labels: Def American Recordings
- Past members: Bill Bateman; Smokey Hormel; Dave Alvin; Gene Taylor; Dave Lee Bartel; Jonny Ray Bartel; Lester Butler; Paul "The Kid" Size; Zach Zunis; Mike Flanigin

The Red Devils were a Los Angeles–based blues rock band who were active from 1988 to 1994, featuring singer Lester Butler.

The band released a live album, a four-song EP, and recorded songs with Mick Jagger and Johnny Cash. By 1994, the band had broken up, although some members occasionally perform with guest musicians as the Red Devils or their earlier name, the Blue Shadows. In 2017, such a lineup toured and recorded Return of the Red Devils in the Netherlands.

== Background ==
Originally called the Blue Shadows, the band formed as an offshoot of roots rock/punk band The Blasters in 1988. They established themselves as the Monday-night house band of a Los Angeles neighborhood club, King King. Early members included Smokey Hormel, Dave Alvin, and Gene Taylor, but by 1990–1991, the lineup had more or less stabilized with drummer Bill Bateman, bassist Jonny Ray Bartel, guitarist Dave Lee Bartel, singer/harmonica player Lester Butler, and guitarist Paul "The Kid" Size.

Their Monday night performances at the King King became popular with area residents and also drew "interest from the likes of ZZ Top's Billy Gibbons, Angus and Malcolm Young of AC/DC, and the then-red-hot Black Crowes. Queen guitarist Brian May showed up to jam one night". Actor Bruce Willis and members of Motörhead, Dokken, and Red Hot Chili Peppers also joined in the jam sessions.

== King King ==
Rubin (center) with Butler (right) at bus stop in front of King King

By early 1991, the Blue Shadows came to the attention of producers Rick Rubin and George Drakoulias of Def American Recordings. The band hoped that Drakoulias would work with them, but it became clear that Rubin was going to produce their debut album. According to guitarist Dave Lee Bartel, "He [Rubin] had the vision of it all". One of his first orders of business was a name change: the Blue Shadows became the Red Devils (a name once used by a rockabilly band with the Bartel brothers). Rubin decided that their debut album was going to be a live album, "a one-take, no-overdubs release, titled simply King King", and chose the songs and the cover art.

King King was recorded at the club during three or four of their regular Monday-night performances in 1991. It featured a mix of songs by blues artists, including three written by Willie Dixon, along with some band originals. The album was released in July 1992 and an early review called it "the year's most electrifying live album, a stunning debut".

== Recording with Mick Jagger ==
Mick Jagger became interested in the Red Devils following a recommendation by Rick Rubin, who was producing Jagger's third solo album Wandering Spirit. After scouting the band at King King, Jagger joined them on stage in May 1992 and performed Bo Diddley's "Who Do You Love?" and Little Walter's version of "Blues with a Feeling". A month later, the Red Devils were invited to record some blues standards with Jagger, presumably for his upcoming solo album. During one thirteen-hour recording session at Ocean Way Recording in Hollywood, Jagger and the Devils recorded thirteen songs, including "Mean Old World", "Talk to Me Baby", "Shake 'Em on Down", and "Forty Days and Forty Nights". According to bassist Jonny Ray Bartel, the songs were essentially unrehearsed and most were completed in three or fewer takes, with no overdubs – Jagger wanted to recreate the spontaneous, rough-and-tumble quality of his favorite early Chicago blues.

When Jagger's Wandering Spirit was released in 1993, it did not include any of the songs recorded with the Red Devils. During a short tour of England in March and April 1993, Jagger joined the band for several performances and there was talk of releasing an album with the June 1992 recordings. However, only one song from the session, "Checkin' Up on My Baby", was released, appearing on Jagger's The Very Best of Mick Jagger album in 2007.

== Touring and last recordings ==
Handbill for Dutch concert (with images of ex-members Size and Dave Lee Bartel scratched out).

In August 1992, the Red Devils began an extensive U.S. tour. In March 1993, the band headed to Europe and played at several high-profile festivals, including the Pinkpop Festival. By June 1993, they were back in Los Angeles to play their last gig at King King club. By then, the constant touring and singer/harmonica player Lester Butler's growing substance-abuse problems led to friction within the band and with Rubin. Guitarist Paul "The Kid" Size quit the band to return to Texas and was replaced by Smokey Hormel, who had played earlier with the band.

In September 1993, Rick Rubin brought the Red Devils back to the studio to record with music legend Johnny Cash. During their impromptu session, Cash showed the band some songs, including "T for Texas", "Bad News", "Devil's Right Hand", and "Thirteen". Their recording of "T for Texas" was later released on Cash's Unearthed 2003 album. After Cash left, Rubin announced "OK, we're gonna record your next album right now" to the band's surprise. Nine songs were recorded with guitarist Zach Zunis, who replaced Hormel. However, due to mounting problems, the album was never completed. Four songs from the session were later released on the Blackwater Roll EP.

In November 1993, the band returned to Europe for more club and festival dates. However, by 1994, the band was on its last legs. "It was getting harder and harder to get Lester to want to rehearse [and soon] Butler stopped showing up for gigs as well". Rubin then dropped the band and by the end of 1994 they essentially disbanded. Members of the Red Devils began other musical pursuits – Butler performed with various musicians before forming his final group, 13; he became popular in Europe, but died in 1998 at age 38. The remaining members have sometimes performed with different musicians as the Blue Shadows and on May 27, 2012, four of the original members reunited as the Red Devils.

In May 2017, three of the original members, along with another former member, reunited for a tour in the Netherlands. Bill Bateman, Jonny Ray Bartel, Paul Size, Mike Flanigin, with Dutch blues singer/harmonica player Pieter "Big Pete" Van Der Pluijm, played concerts, including headlining a night at the Ribs and Blues Festival in Raalte, the Netherlands. The band then joined ZZ Top as the opening act on the European leg of their 2017 Tonnage Tour. An album recorded at two June 2017 performances in the Netherlands was released as Return of the Red Devils.

== Discography ==
- 1992 – King King (live)
- 1993 – Blackwater Roll (4-song EP)
- 2017 – Return of the Red Devils (live)
