= Visions of Paradise (Mick Jagger song) =

2002 single by Mick Jagger

Single by Mick Jagger

from the album Goddess in the Doorway
- Released: 2001 (With album); 12 March 2002 (As single)
- Genre: Rock and Roll
- Length: 4:01
- Label: Virgin Records
- Songwriter(s): Mick Jagger; Rob Thomas; Matt Clifford
- Producer(s): Mick Jagger; Marti Frederiksen

Mick Jagger singles chronology
"God Gave Me Everything" (2001)	"Visions of Paradise" (2001)	"Old Habits Die Hard" (2004)

"Visions of Paradise" is a single by English singer-songwriter Mick Jagger, the opening track and single from his fourth solo album, Goddess in the Doorway. Released as a single on 12 March 2002, it reached No. 43 in the UK charts.

== Chart performance ==
Chart	Peak position
UK Top 75 Singles	43
