= Just Another Night (Mick Jagger song) =

1985 song performed by Mick Jagger

Single by Mick Jagger

from the album She's the Boss
- B-side: "Turn the Girl Loose"
- Released: February 1985
- Genre: Dance rock
- Length: 5:13
- Label: Columbia
- Songwriter: Mick Jagger
- Producers: Mick Jagger, Bill Laswell

Mick Jagger singles chronology
"State of Shock" (1984)	"Just Another Night" (1985)	"Lucky in Love" (1985)

Music video
- "Just Another Night" on YouTube

"Just Another Night" is a song written and performed by English musician Mick Jagger, released as the first single from his debut solo album, She's the Boss, in 1985. The song peaked at number 32 on the UK Singles Chart and number 12 on the US Billboard Hot 100, topping the Billboard Top Rock Tracks chart for two weeks. The single entered the top 10 in Belgium, the Netherlands, New Zealand and Sweden.

== Music video ==
The music video, directed by Julien Temple, features actress Rae Dawn Chong as Mick Jagger's love interest.

== Controversy ==
Jagger was accused of infringing the copyright of another song entitled "Just Another Night" by Patrick Alley, a Jamaican reggae singer from New York. A six-member jury ruled in Jagger's favor in 1988.

== Personnel ==
- Mick Jagger – lead vocals and backing vocals
- Jeff Beck – electric and acoustic guitar
- John "Rabbit" Bundrick – synthesizer
- Aïyb Dieng – shaker
- Sly Dunbar – acoustic drums
- Anton Fier – Simmons electronic drums
- Bill Laswell – synthesizer
- Ron Magness – synthesizer
- Robbie Shakespeare – bass

=== Production ===
- Mick Jagger – production
- Bill Laswell/Material – production
- James Farber – engineering
- Dave Jerden – engineering
- Bill Scheniman – engineering
- Peter Corriston – art direction, design
- Erica Lennard – photography

== Charts ==
=== Weekly charts ===
Chart (1985)	Peak position
Australia (Kent Music Report)	13
Austria (Ö3 Austria Top 40)	17
Belgium (Ultratop 50 Flanders)	5
Canada Retail Singles (The Record)	12
Canada Top Singles (RPM)	12
Europe (European Hot 100 Singles)	9
Ireland (IRMA)	21
Netherlands (Dutch Top 40)	4
Netherlands (Single Top 100)	8
New Zealand (Recorded Music NZ)	8
Sweden (Sverigetopplistan)	6
Switzerland (Schweizer Hitparade)	17
UK Singles (Official Charts)	32
US Billboard Hot 100	12
US Dance Club Songs (Billboard)	11
US Dance Singles Sales (Billboard)	20
US Hot R&B/Hip-Hop Songs (Billboard)	83
US Mainstream Rock Airplay (Billboard)	1
West Germany (GfK)	16

=== Year-end charts ===
Chart (1985)	Position
Australia (Kent Music Report)	99
Belgium (Ultratop)	40
Netherlands (Dutch Top 40)	47
Netherlands (Single Top 100)	53
