= Lucky in Love (Mick Jagger song) =

1985 single by Mick Jagger

Single by Mick Jagger

from the album She's the Boss
- B-side: "Running Out of Luck"
- Released: April 1985
- Genre: Rock
- Length: 6:14
- Label: CBS
- Songwriter(s): Mick Jagger; Carlos Alomar
- Producer(s): Mick Jagger; Tim Crich; Francois Kevorkian; Ron St. Germain

Mick Jagger singles chronology
| "Lonely at the Top" (1985) | "Lucky in Love" (1985) | "Hard Woman" (1985) |

"Lucky in Love" is a song written and performed by English singer-songwriter Mick Jagger released as the second single from his debut album, She's the Boss, in 1985. "Lucky in Love" was the seventh track on She's the Boss and was one of two tracks from She's the Boss included on Jagger's greatest hits album, The Very Best of Mick Jagger. The single version of the song that was also released on video has been remixed considerably from the album version. The single version of the song is 4:51 long. It was a #38 hit on the Billboard Hot 100 charts that year.

== Personnel ==
- Mick Jagger – lead vocals and backing vocals
- Jeff Beck – electric guitar
- Robbie Shakespeare – bass
- Wally Badarou – synthesizers
- Herbie Hancock – synthesizer and sampler
- Guy Fletcher – synthesizer
- Chuck Leavell – organ
- Ray Cooper – percussion
- Aïyb Dieng – water drums
- Sly Dunbar – drums
- Bernard Fowler – backing vocals

=== Production ===
- Mick Jagger - producer
- Bill Laswell/Material - producer
- James Farber - engineer
- Dave Jerden - engineer
- Bill Scheniman - engineer
- Peter Corriston - art direction, design
- Erica Lennard - photography

== Chart performance ==
| Chart | Peak position |
|---|---|
| Australia (Kent Music Report) | 77 |
| UK Top 100 Singles | 91 |
| Mainstream Rock Tracks | 5 |
| The Billboard Hot 100 | 38 |
| Hot Dance/Club Play | 11 |
| Hot Dance Music/Maxi-Singles Sales | 35 |
