= Alfie (2004 film soundtrack) =

Soundtrack album by Mick Jagger and Dave Stewart
- Released: 18 October 2004
- Recorded: 2004
- Genre: Soundtrack
- Label: EMI
- Producers: Mick Jagger; Dave Stewart; John Powell

Mick Jagger chronology
Goddess in the Doorway (2001)	Alfie (2004)	The Very Best of Mick Jagger (2007)

Dave Stewart chronology
Sly-Fi (1998)	Alfie (2004)	The Dave Stewart Songbook Vol. 1 (2008)

Singles from Alfie
- 1. "Old Habits Die Hard" Released: 2004

Alfie is a soundtrack album to the film of the same name, released in 2004. It was largely produced, performed and written by Mick Jagger and Dave Stewart, with vocal contributions from Joss Stone, Sheryl Crow and Nadirah "Nadz" Seid. A then-unknown Katy Perry provides backing vocals on two of the tracks.

The original 1966 film for which this was a remake, also had a soundtrack album by Sonny Rollins. The Burt Bacharach-Hal David song "Alfie" which played over the end credits of both films, did not feature in the Rollins soundtrack, but it appears here. Cher re-recorded the song for the closing credits of the remake, but it was dropped in favour of a version by Stone.

For the song "Old Habits Die Hard", Jagger and Stewart won the BFCA Award, Golden Globe, Sierra Award and the World Soundtrack Award. The track "New York Hustle" is the losing song for the New York Rangers and the New York Knicks for home games.

== Track listing ==
All tracks written by Mick Jagger and David A. Stewart, except where noted.

No.	Title	Writer(s)	Artist(s)	Length
1.	"Old Habits Die Hard"		Mick Jagger and David A. Stewart	4:27
2.	"Blind Leading the Blind" (Live Acoustic Version)		Mick Jagger and David A. Stewart	5:57
3.	"New York Hustle"		Mick Jagger and David A. Stewart	2:44
4.	"Let's Make It Up"		Mick Jagger and David A. Stewart	4:28
5.	"Wicked Time"	Jagger; Stewart; Seid; Burt Bacharach; Hal David	Joss Stone and Nadirah "Nadz" Seid, featuring Mick Jagger	4:18
6.	"Lonely Without You (This Christmas)"		Mick Jagger and Joss Stone	2:37
7.	"Darkness of Your Love"	Stewart; Cooper; Charles Shyer	Gary "Mudbone" Cooper and David A. Stewart	3:41
8.	"Jack the Lad"		Mick Jagger and David A. Stewart	3:17
9.	"Oh Nikki"		Mick Jagger and David A. Stewart	1:16
10.	"Blind Leading the Blind"		Mick Jagger and David A. Stewart	4:28
11.	"Standing in the Rain"		Mick Jagger and David A. Stewart	3:29
12.	"Counting the Days"		Mick Jagger and David A. Stewart	3:12
13.	"Old Habits Reprise"		Mick Jagger and David A. Stewart	2:11
14.	"Alfie"	Bacharach; David	Joss Stone	4:22

US & Canada bonus track
No.	Title	Artist(s)	Length
15.	"Old Habits Die Hard"	Mick Jagger and David A. Stewart, featuring Sheryl Crow	4:30

== Personnel ==
Adapted from the album's liner notes.

=== Musicians ===
- Mick Jagger – lead vocals (tracks 1, 2, 4, 6, 10), backing vocals (tracks 1, 4, 5), vocalizations (track 8), guitar (track 1), acoustic guitar (tracks 2, 11), harmonica (tracks 3, 9, 11), percussion (track 9)
- Dave Stewart – lead guitars (tracks 1, 10), lead guitar (track 13), acoustic guitar (track 2), guitars (tracks 3, 4, 5, 7), guitar (tracks 6, 8, 9, 12), electric guitar (track 11)
- Raymond Angry – Hammond B3 organ (tracks 5, 14)
- Jeff Bova – Hammond B3 organ (tracks 6, 7, 9), piano (track 6)
- Yolanda Charles – bass guitar (tracks 1–5, 8, 10, 11, 13)
- Adrien Cooke – Hammond B3 organ (track 4)
- Gary "Mudbone" Cooper – lead vocals (track 7)
- Jesse Davey – lead guitar (track 6), guitar (tracks 9, 12), featured artist (track 8)
- Robin Davey – bass guitar (tracks 6, 7, 9, 12)
- Virgil Donati – drums (tracks 6, 7, 9, 12)
- Geoff Donkin – tambourine (track 7)
- Steve Donnelly – guitar (track 13)
- Claudia Fontaine – backing vocalizations (tracks 3, 9), backing vocals (tracks 6, 7), backing vocal improvisations (track 11)
- Kaya Jones – backing vocals (tracks 1, 4)
- The Kick Horns – brass (tracks 6, 7, 9, 12)
- Ally McErlaine – guitar (tracks 1, 10), slide guitar (tracks 2, 3)
- Royce Nelson – backing vocals (tracks 1, 4)
- James Pearson – piano (track 14)
- Katy Perry – backing vocals (tracks 1, 4)
- John Powell – strings arrangement (track 6), brass arrangement (tracks 6, 7, 9), piano (track 12)
- Mike Rowe – keyboards (tracks 1, 3, 5, 8, 10, 11, 13), piano (track 2)
- Nadirah "Nadz" Seid – rap (track 5)
- Chris Sharrock – drums (tracks 1–5, 8, 10, 13)
- Faye Simpson – backing vocalizations (tracks 3, 9), backing vocals (tracks 6, 7), backing vocal improvisations (track 11)
- Beverly Skeete – backing vocalizations (tracks 3, 9), backing vocals (tracks 6, 7), lead vocal improvisations (track 11), backing vocal improvisations (track 11)
- Sam Stewart – lead guitar (track 3)
- Joss Stone – lead vocals (tracks 5, 6, 14)

=== Technical ===
- Mick Jagger – producer (tracks 1–6, 8–14)
- Dave Stewart – producer (all tracks)
- Charles Shyer – executive producer
- Tony Wadsworth – executive producer
- Bob Clearmountain – mixing (tracks 1–4, 8, 10, 12)
- Peter Cobbin – recording (tracks 5, 7, 14), additional recording (track 3), mixing (tracks 5–7, 9, 11, 14)
- Ned Douglas – programming (tracks 1, 3–10)
- Kevin Harp – mixing assistant (tracks 1–4, 8, 10, 12)
- Richard Lancaster – recording assistant (track 9)
- Steve McLoughlin – recording (tracks 6–9, 12, 13), additional recording (track 1), mixing (track 13)
- Sam Okell – recording assistant (tracks 3, 5–7, 9, 11, 14)
- John Powell – co-producer (tracks 12, 13)
- Mirek Stiles – recording assistant (tracks 1–5, 8, 10, 11, 13, 14)
- David Tickle – recording (tracks 1–4, 8, 10, 11)
- Geoff Donkin – photography
- Recorded at Abbey Road, London (all tracks)

== Charts ==
Chart (2004)	Peak position
UK Top Soundtracks	36
Billboard Top Soundtracks	11
