= Cary Baker =

American music publicist (born 1955)

- Born: November 14, 1955 (age 70); Chicago, Illinois, U.S.
- Education: New Trier Township High School West; Northern Illinois University
- Occupations: music publicist, journalist
- Years active: 1973–present
- Website: www.carybaker.com

Cary Baker is an American music publicist, author, journalist, and reissue record producer. He is the author of the 2024 book Down on the Corner: Adventures in Busking and Street Music.

His work is archived at the Wilson Library at the University of North Carolina at Chapel Hill and the Rock and Roll Hall of Fame.

== Early life and education ==
Baker was born in Chicago on November 14, 1955, and grew up in the suburb of Wilmette, Illinois. He started writing about blues, rock and punk rock music while in high school. As a teenager, he wrote a feature on Blind Arvella Gray for the Chicago Reader, and in 1972 convinced the owner of the Wilmette-based Birch Records to finance and release Gray's only album, The Singing Drifter.

Baker attended Northern Illinois University. While a student, he wrote for publications including Billboard, Creem, Trouser Press and Triad. He graduated in 1978.

== Career ==
=== 1979-1997: Ovation Records, I.R.S. Records, Capitol Records ===
Following his graduation, Baker worked part time at Billboard. His first full-time job was as publicity director for the country label Ovation Records. He continued to write frequently about music.

In 1984, he moved to Los Angeles to work for I.R.S. Records. As the director of national publicity, he helped artists, including The Go-Go's and R.E.M., find audiences in their early days. He also worked with The Alarm, Timbuk3, Fine Young Cannibals, The dB's, and General Public among others. He was promoted to vice president of publicity at IRS before he left the label in 1988 to accept a job as national director of media and artist relations at Capitol Records. After leaving Capitol, he was national publicity director at labels including Enigma Records, Morgan Creek, and Discovery Records.

=== 1998-2022: Baker/Northrop, Conqueroo, reissues and compilations ===
In 1998, Baker co-founded the Baker/Northrop Media Group, whose clients included Cheap Trick, Robert Cray, Delbert McClinton, Yes, HBO's Reverb series, and Susan Tedeschi. He founded Conqueroo, a music publicity company that specialized in roots music, Americana and blues, in 2004. Conqueroo's clients included Mitch Ryder, Bobby Rush, Pam Tillis, Los Lonely Boys, Willie Nile, James McMurtry, Marshall Crenshaw, Chris Hillman, Rodney Crowell, and Nils Lofgren. In 2006, he was named Blues Publicist of the Year at the Blues Foundation's Keeping the Blues Alive Awards.

In addition to his work in public relations, Baker helped compile and annotate reissue collections from a number of record manufacturers over the course of his career. He co-produced the Blues Music Award-winning box set Bobby Rush: Chicken Heads: 50 Years of Bobby Rush and wrote liner notes for reissues from The Numero Group, as well as for albums from Muddy Waters and Little Milton for Chess Records, Luther Allison, Little Milton, The NoBS, Jay Migliori and others.

=== 2022-present: Down on the Corner: Adventures in Busking and Street Music ===
Baker retired from Conqueroo in March 2022. In November 2024, his book Down on the Corner: Adventures in Busking and Street Music was published by Jawbone Press. An NPR "Book of the Day" in December, it includes Baker's interviews with Lucinda Williams, Violent Femmes, Billy Bragg, Old Crow Medicine Show, Ramblin’ Jack Elliott, and Madeleine Peyroux, among others. In a Chicago Tribune story published just after its release, Rick Kogan described Down on the Corner as "an important book that explores a sadly overlooked form of music...soaring in its ability to provide a panoramic view of busking from the East Coast to the South, California and Europe."
