= King King (album) =

Live album by the Red Devils
- Released: July 28, 1992
- Recorded: 1991
- Venue: King King Club, Los Angeles
- Genre: Blues rock
- Length: 59:04
- Label: Def American
- Producer: Rick Rubin

King King is the debut album by the blues-rock band the Red Devils. It was recorded live at King King Club in Los Angeles during three or four of their regular Monday-night performances in 1991.

The album captures the immediacy and informality of a small club performance. It features the band's interpretation of blues songs originally recorded by Little Walter, Sonny Boy Williamson II, Howlin' Wolf, and Willie Dixon as well as some band originals. King King was produced by Rick Rubin.

== Critical reception ==
Professional ratings
Review scores
Source	Rating
AllMusic	3/5 stars

King King was released in July 1992 and a review in USA Today called it "the year's most electrifying live album, a stunning debut". According to the Los Angeles Times, "King King is a 12-song live recording that captures the band in fine, aggressive form at the La Brea Avenue club". The Baltimore Sun noted that "the group avoids the sort of overplaying that usually undoes white blues bands, leaving the sound lean, mean and utterly believable." The Toronto Star called the album "a heap of unremarkable originals and tepid blues covers, recorded live in such poor quality, an audience member holding a cassette recorder couldn't have done worse."

AllMusic's gave the album a three out of five star rating, calling it a mix of straight-ahead blues and singer/harmonica player Lester Butler's later alternative rock.

== Track listing ==
No.	Title	Writer(s)	Length
1.	"Automatic"	Willie Love	3:26
2.	"Goin' to the Church"	Lester Butler	4:07
3.	"She's Dangerous"	Willie Dixon	5:02
4.	"I Wish You Would"	Billy Boy Arnold	3:01
5.	"Cross Your Heart"	Rice Miller a.k.a. Sonny Boy Williamson II	4:28
6.	"Tail Dragger"	Dixon	5:24
7.	"Devil Woman"	The Red Devils	6:57
8.	"No Fightin'"	Butler	5:56
9.	"Mr. Highway Man"	Chester Burnett a.k.a. Howlin' Wolf	3:35
10.	"I'm Ready"	Dixon	3:46
11.	"Quarter to Twelve"	Marion Jacobs a.k.a. Little Walter	7:03
12.	"Cut That Out"	Junior Wells	4:59
Total length:			59:04

== Personnel ==
- Lester Butler – vocals, harmonica
- Paul "The Kid" Size – lead guitar
- Dave Lee Bartel – rhythm guitar
- Johnny Ray Bartel – bass
- Bill Bateman – drums
