= Eazy Sleazy =

Single by Mick Jagger and Dave Grohl

Single by Mick Jagger featuring Dave Grohl
- Released: 13 April 2021
- Recorded: 2021
- Genre: Rock, hard rock
- Length: 3:46
- Label: Polydor Records
- Songwriters: Mick Jagger; Dave Grohl
- Producers: Mick Jagger; Matt Clifford

Mick Jagger singles chronology
"Gotta Get a Grip" (2017)	"Eazy Sleazy" (2021)	"Strange Game" (2022)

"Eazy Sleazy" is a song by Rolling Stones frontman Mick Jagger and Dave Grohl. It was surprise-released 13 April 2021 through Polydor Records. Jagger conceived the single during the COVID-19 pandemic and collaborated with drummer Dave Grohl and producer Matt Clifford virtually. "Eazy Sleazy" is an upbeat, "muscular, melodic" hard rock song. So far the song is only available on YouTube.

== Writing and recording ==
"Eazy Sleazy" was written initially by Jagger during March 2021 while watching coverage of the COVID-19 pandemic.

== Lyrics ==
The song's lyrics describe life during the COVID-19 pandemic and common frustrations, including misinformation relating to the pandemic. The lyrics mention TikTok dances, Zoom video conferencing, and Bill Gates conspiracy theories. "Eazy Sleazy"'s chorus is deliberately optimistic for a post-pandemic future, with Jagger singing "It's gonna be a garden of earthly delights" and "It'll be a memory you're trying to remember to forget".

== Critical reception ==
NME's Tom Skinner referred to "Eazy Sleazy" as an "infectious rock team-up", while Variety editor Jem Aswad referred to it as a "pandemic anthem" and "punky song" that is "the liveliest thing Jagger has released in many years". The Guardian's Ben Beaumont-Thomas found the track "amusing", stating that it railed "against the boredom of lockdowns" during the pandemic.

== Personnel ==
- Mick Jagger – lead vocals, rhythm guitar
- Dave Grohl – drums, lead guitar, bass guitar, backing vocals
