= Primitive Cool =

Studio album by Mick Jagger
- Released: 14 September 1987
- Recorded: 17 November – 18 December 1986, and January–May 1987
- Studio: Wisseloord Studios (Hilversum); Blue Wave Studios (Barbados); Right Track Recording (New York City, New York, USA)
- Genre: Rock
- Length: 49:20
- Label: Columbia
- Producer: Keith Diamond; Mick Jagger; David A. Stewart

Mick Jagger chronology
She's the Boss (1985)	Primitive Cool (1987)	Wandering Spirit (1993)

Singles from Primitive Cool
- 1. "Let's Work" Released: August 1987; 2. "Throwaway" Released: November 1987 (UK/US); 3. "Say You Will" Released: November 1987 (EU)

Primitive Cool is the second solo studio album by the English singer Mick Jagger, released in 1987. As the follow-up to Jagger's 1985 album She's the Boss, Primitive Cool was another attempt by Jagger to become a solo star.

== Background ==
Following the release of the Rolling Stones album Dirty Work in 1986, relations between Jagger and Keith Richards soured after Jagger decided to not tour to promote the album in favour of starting his second solo project. Richards was vocal about his discontent in the media—which Jagger replied to, also publicly; "Kow Tow" and "Shoot Off Your Mouth" were reportedly written in response to disparaging remarks made about Jagger by Keith Richards. Undeterred, Jagger promptly began work on Primitive Cool, recording in the Netherlands and Barbados.

Joining up with David A. Stewart and Keith Diamond in the producer's chair, Jagger used Jeff Beck as the regular guitarist for the sessions, seeking to have more uniformity in the recordings.

== Reception ==
Professional ratings
Review scores
Source	Rating
AllMusic	3/5 stars
Robert Christgau	B−
Number One	2/5 stars
Rolling Stone	favourable

Released in September 1987 with "Let's Work" as the lead single, the commercial reaction to Primitive Cool was not as welcoming as the reception for She's the Boss, with the album merely reaching No. 26 in the UK and No. 41 in the United States with "Let's Work" and follow-ups singles "Throwaway" and "Say You Will" were minor hits, not at all rivalling "Just Another Night" in commercial success. As a result, although Jagger toured Primitive Cool, it was only in Japan, Australia & New Zealand, not feeling confident enough to attempt American or British shows.

== Reissue ==
Although originally released by Columbia Records, Primitive Cool was acquired and reissued by Atlantic Records in 1993, following the release of Jagger's third album, Wandering Spirit, which was issued by Atlantic.

== Track listing ==
All tracks are written by Mick Jagger, except where noted.

Side one
No.	Title	Writer(s)	Length
1.	"Throwaway"		5:03
2.	"Let's Work"	Jagger, David A. Stewart	4:50
3.	"Radio Control"		3:56
4.	"Say You Will"	Jagger, Stewart	5:07
5.	"Primitive Cool"		5:50

Side two
No.	Title	Writer(s)	Length
6.	"Kow Tow"	Jagger, Stewart	4:55
7.	"Shoot Off Your Mouth"		3:35
8.	"Peace for the Wicked"		4:02
9.	"Party Doll"		5:20
10.	"War Baby"		6:39
Total length:			49:17

== Personnel ==
- Mick Jagger – vocals, guitars, autoharp, harmonica, percussion
- Phil Ashley – keyboards
- Richard Cottle – keyboards
- Jeff Beck – lead guitar
- G. E. Smith – guitars
- Doug Wimbish – bass guitar
- Simon Phillips – drums

Additional musicians

- Denzil Miller – keyboards
- Greg Phillinganes – keyboards
- Patrick Seymour – keyboards
- Keith Diamond – programming
- Olle Romo – programming
- Jim Barber – rhythm guitar
- Vernon Reid – rhythm guitar
- Jimmy Rip – rhythm guitar
- David A. Stewart – rhythm guitar
- Dean Garcia – bass guitar
- Omar Hakim – drums
- Ernst Hanes – gamelan
- David Sanborn – saxophone
- Jon Faddis – trumpet
- Paddy Moloney – whistle, Uilleann pipes
- Seán Keane – fiddle
- Jocelyn Brown – backing vocals
- Craig Derry – backing vocals
- Cindy Mizelle – backing vocals
- Brenda White King – backing vocals
- Harrison College Choir, Barbados – backing vocals

=== Production ===
- Mick Jagger – producer
- David A. Stewart – producer (1, 2, 4, 6)
- Keith Diamond – producer (3, 5, 7, 8, 10)
- Jon Bavin – engineer
- Manu Guiot – engineer
- Bob Rosa – engineer
- Ed Stasium – engineer, mixing (1, 3–10)
- Michael Barbiero – mixing (2)
- Steve Thompson – mixing (2)
- Albert Bucholz – assistant engineer
- Michiel Hoogenboezem – assistant engineer
- Glen Johansen – assistant engineer
- Scott Mabuchi – assistant engineer
- Moira Marquis – assistant engineer
- Danny Mormando – assistant engineer
- Paul Hamingson – mix assistant (1, 3–10)
- Rhonda Schoen – digital editing
- Greg Calbi – mastering at Sterling Sound (New York, NY)
- Tony King – album coordinator
- Roger Davies – creative consultant
- Christopher Austopchuk – package design
- Francesco Clemente – package concept, illustration

== Charts ==
Chart (1987)	Peak position
Australian Albums (Kent Music Report)	25
UK Top 100 Albums	26
US Billboard 200	41

== Certifications and sales ==
Region	Certification	Certified units/sales
Canada (Music Canada)	Gold	50,000^{^}
^{^} Shipments figures based on certification alone.

== Singles ==
Year	Single	List	Position
1987	"Let's Work"	UK Top 100 Singles	31
1987	"Let's Work"	Mainstream Rock Tracks	7
1987	"Let's Work"	Billboard Hot 100	39
1987	"Let's Work"	Hot Dance Music/Club Play	32
1987	"Let's Work"	Hot Dance Music/Maxi-Singles Sales	48
1987	"Throwaway"	Mainstream Rock Tracks	7
1987	"Throwaway"	Billboard Hot 100	67
1987	"Say You Will"	Mainstream Rock Tracks	39
