= Old Habits Die Hard =

2004 single by Mick Jagger

Single by Mick Jagger

from the album Alfie
- Released: 2004
- Recorded: 2004
- Genre: Rock
- Length: 4:28
- Label: Interscope
- Songwriter(s): Mick Jagger; David A. Stewart
- Producer(s): Mick Jagger

Mick Jagger singles chronology
"Sweet Thing" (1993)	"Old Habits Die Hard" (2004)	"Gotta Get a Grip" / "England Lost" (2017)

"Old Habits Die Hard" is a song from the 2004 movie Alfie, with music by David Stewart and lyrics by Mick Jagger, and performed by Jagger. It won the 2005 Golden Globe Award for Best Original Song. However, the song failed to get nominated for the Academy Award for Best Original Song, making it the first in five consecutive years where the song that won the Golden Globe was not nominated for an Oscar.

Two versions of "Old Habits Die Hard" are available in the Alfie soundtrack: One performed by Mick Jagger alone, and second version featuring Sheryl Crow. The song also features backing vocals by then-unknown pop singer Katy Perry.
