= Performance (soundtrack) =

Soundtrack album by various
- Released: September 19, 1970
- Length: 36:26
- Label: Warner Bros.
- Producer: Jack Nitzsche

Singles from Performance
- 1. "Memo from Turner" Released: October 23, 1970

Professional ratings
Review scores
Source	Rating
Allmusic	4.5/5 stars
Christgau's Record Guide	B−

Performance is a 1970 soundtrack album to the film Performance by Donald Cammell and Nicolas Roeg. It features music from Randy Newman, Merry Clayton, Ry Cooder, Jack Nitzsche, Buffy Sainte-Marie, The Last Poets and Mick Jagger.

A single from the album, "Memo from Turner" sung by Mick Jagger (b/w the instrumental "Natural Magic") was released in 1970 reaching #32 on the UK singles chart.

== Tracks ==
Side 1

1. "Gone Dead Train" 2:56 - Randy Newman (Jack Nitzsche/Russ Titelman)
2. "Performance" 1:49 (Bernie Krause, Merry Clayton)
3. "Get Away" 2:09 (Ry Cooder)
4. "Powis Square 2:25 (Ry Cooder)
5. "Rolls Royce and Acid" 1:50 (Jack Nitzsche)
6. "Dyed, Dead, Red" 2:35 (Buffy Sainte-Marie)
7. "Harry Flowers" 4:03 (Jack Nitzsche, Randy Newman)

Side 2

1. "Memo from Turner" 4:08 (Mick Jagger, Keith Richards)
2. "Hashishin" 3:39 (Buffy Sainte-Marie, Ry Cooder)
3. "Wake Up, Niggers" 2:47 (The Last Poets)
4. "Poor White Hound Dog" 2:50 (Merry Clayton)
5. "Natural Magic" 1:40 (Jack Nitzsche)
6. "Turner's Murder" 4:15 (Merry Clayton Singers)

== Screen credits ==
- Original music by Jack Nitzsche
- Conductor: Randy Newman
- Singers: Randy Newman (1), Mick Jagger (8), Merry Clayton (2, 11), Buffy Sainte-Marie (9), Merry Clayton Singers (13)
- Santoor: Nasser Rastegar-Nejad
- Moog synthesizer: Bernard Krause

Music performers

- Ry Cooder – guitar
- Amiyo Das Gupta – sitar
- Lowell George – guitar
- Milt Holland – drums, percussion
- Gene Parsons – drums, guitars
- Russ Titelman – percussion
- Bobby West – bass

== Cover versions ==
- William Orbit recorded "Harry Flowers" for his Strange Cargo III (1993)
