= Goddess in the Doorway =

Studio album by Mick Jagger
- Released: 19 November 2001
- Recorded: February and May 2000, January–February and April–June 2001
- Studios: Roxie (Miami); Third Stone (Los Angeles); Drive By (Los Angeles); Rumbo (Los Angeles); Chiswick (London); Metropolis (London); Norfolk Lodge (Richmond); Mick Jagger's hotel room (Heidkamp); Hit Factory (New York City)
- Genre: Rock
- Length: 56:51
- Label: Virgin
- Producers: Matt Clifford; Marti Frederiksen; Mick Jagger; Jerry 'Wonder' Duplessis; Wyclef Jean; Lenny Kravitz; Chris Potter

Mick Jagger chronology
Wandering Spirit (1993)	Goddess in the Doorway (2001)	Alfie (2004)

Singles from Goddess in the Doorway
- 1. "God Gave Me Everything" Released: November 2001; 2. "Visions of Paradise" Released: February 2002

Goddess in the Doorway is the fourth solo album by Mick Jagger, released in 2001. The most recent offering from Jagger as a solo artist, it marked his first release with Virgin Records, with whom he has been contracted as a member of the Rolling Stones since 1991.

== Background ==
Following his 1993 album Wandering Spirit, and The Rolling Stones' Voodoo Lounge and Bridges to Babylon in 1994 and 1997, Jagger began to work on demo material in 2000, finally reaching the studio in the spring of 2001. Although Jagger would primarily work with Marti Frederiksen and Matt Clifford as producers, he also sanctioned the talents of Lenny Kravitz and Wyclef Jean to help create Goddess in the Doorway. And while the songs would largely be composed by Jagger, he endeavoured to work with other collaborators, namely, Kravitz and Rob Thomas, lead vocalist of Matchbox Twenty. The recording sessions of several of the album's tracks were featured in the documentary Being Mick. The Cover Photo was created by German fashion Designer Karl Lagerfeld.

== Recording ==
While recording was underway, many of Jagger's musician friends, including Bono, Pete Townshend, Thomas, Kravitz, Jean and Joe Perry all made contributions. Townshend, in fact, was the initiating force behind the album. After having heard some of Jagger's demos, he told him that they didn't sound like Rolling Stones songs and that Jagger should record them on his own.

In the summer of 2001, Jagger had bumped into Missy Elliott and requested her to be part of the album. At his New York hotel, Jagger previewed his demo material to Elliott. Following their meeting, both Jagger's and Elliott's reps confirmed the two artists were slated to collaborate on the song, "Hide Away," however, due to scheduling conflicts their collaboration never saw the light of day. Jagger's collaborations with super-producer Rodney "Darkchild" Jerkins would suffer the same fate. By the end of the summer, Goddess in the Doorway was initially completed and the Kravitz-produced (and almost self-performed) "God Gave Me Everything" was put forward as the lead single that October. The song failed to become a significant hit.

== Reception ==
Professional ratings
Aggregate scores
Source	Rating
Metacritic	62/100
Review scores
Source	Rating
AllMusic	3/5 stars
Blender	2/5 stars
Dotmusic	4/5 stars
E!	B−
Entertainment Weekly	C+
Mojo	1/5 stars
NME	6/10
Q	3/5 stars
Rolling Stone	5/5 stars
Uncut	6/10

Jann Wenner, chief editor for Rolling Stone magazine, bestowed a five-star instant classic rating upon the album, a score that The New Yorker noted as part of a general trend at the magazine, "an almost cynical way of preserving the critical legitimacy of classic-rock artists." More than two decades later, Wenner defended the review in an interview with The New York Times, saying, "The editors themselves put it at four stars, and there was not a critical backlash to the thing. [...] It’s still quite a good album. So I personally intervened. Having sat there and listened to Mick make it, I was in love with it. I confess: I probably went too far. So what? I’m entitled."

Writing for the New York Daily News, Jim Farber said: "From the musicianship to the production to the performance and the lyrics, everything sounds cold and corporate." Keith Richards regularly referred to the album as Dogshit in the Doorway.

Goddess in the Doorway reached No. 44 in the UK and No. 39 in the US. It has sold 80,778 copies in the UK and 317,000 copies in the US.

Following this, Jagger returned to work with the Rolling Stones on Forty Licks (2002) and A Bigger Bang (2005) and their associated world tours, the Licks Tour (2002–03) and the A Bigger Bang Tour (2005–07). Aside from his soundtrack work with David A. Stewart on Alfie in 2004, and the compilation The Very Best of Mick Jagger released in 2007, Goddess in the Doorway remains his last solo release to date.

== Track listing ==
All tracks are written by Mick Jagger, except where noted.

No.	Title	Writer(s)	Length
1.	"Visions of Paradise"	Jagger, Rob Thomas, Matt Clifford	4:02
2.	"Joy"		4:41
3.	"Dancing in the Starlight"	Jagger, Clifford	4:06
4.	"God Gave Me Everything"	Jagger, Lenny Kravitz	3:34
5.	"Hide Away"	Jagger, Wyclef Jean	4:31
6.	"Don't Call Me Up"	Jagger, Pamela Quinlan	5:14
7.	"Goddess in the Doorway"	Jagger, Clifford	4:56
8.	"Lucky Day"		4:51
9.	"Everybody Getting High"		3:55
10.	"Gun"	Jagger, Clifford	4:39
11.	"Too Far Gone"	Jagger, Pamela Quinlan	4:34
12.	"Brand New Set of Rules" ("Brand New Set of Rules" only runs 3:36; it is followed by 2:56 silence and the hidden track "Goddess in the Doorway (Cocktail Version)" 1:07)		7:39
Total length:			56:42

Japanese edition bonus track
No.	Title	Length
13.	"If Things Could Be Different" (If Things Could Be Different" was also the B-side to "Visions of Paradise" in Europe and "Blue"—a 5:40 Mick Jagger composition—was the B-side of the European single "God Gave Me Everything" and the British single "Visions of Paradise)	4:49
Total length:		61:31

== Personnel ==
- Mick Jagger – lead vocals, backing vocals (1–3, 5, 6, 8, 9, 11, 12), acoustic guitar (1, 2, 5, 7, 11, 12), guitars (1–3, 7–10, 12), percussion (2, 10), harmonica (4, 8), slide guitar (6)
- Matt Clifford – acoustic piano (1, 2, 6, 9, 11), Hammond B3 organ (1–3, 6, 8, 11, 12), string arrangements (1, 3, 5, 6, 9–11), backing vocals (1–3, 12), synthesizers (2), Rhodes electric piano (3), keyboard bass (3), keyboards (5, 7, 10), Mellotron strings (7, 8, 12), drum programming (7, 10), horn arrangements (8, 10), keyboard programming (9), Mellotron (10)
- Mikal Reid – loop programming (1, 9)
- Robert Aaron – keyboards (5), flute (5), French horn (5)
- Kyle Cook – lead guitar (1)
- Marti Frederiksen – guitars (1, 3, 6, 9), snare loop (1), string arrangements (1, 6), backing vocals (1, 3 6, 11), acoustic guitar (3, 6, 11), drums (9), bass (11)
- Steve Knightley – cellomandolin (1, 6, 7)
- Pete Townshend – guitar (2, 10)
- Milton McDonald – guitars (3)
- Lenny Kravitz – electric guitar (4), bass (4), drums (4), tambourine (4), backing vocals (4)
- Craig Ross – acoustic 12-string guitar (4)
- Wyclef Jean – electric guitar (5), Spanish guitar (5)
- Mick Dolan – guitars (8), acoustic guitar (12), lead guitar (12)
- Joe Perry – guitar (9, 11)
- Phil Spalding – bass guitar (1, 2, 7–10, 12)
- Jerry Duplessis – bass guitar (5)
- Criis Frederickson – bass guitar (6)
- Ian Thomas – drums (1, 2, 7, 8, 10, 12)
- Kenny Aronoff – drums (3), Indian drum (9)
- Jim Keltner – drums (6, 11)
- Martin "Max"!Heyes – drum programming (7, 10)
- Lenny Castro – percussion (1, 3, 6, 11)
- Paul Clarvis – percussion (7)
- Patsy Gamble – baritone saxophone (8)
- Chris White – tenor saxophone (8)
- Neil Sidwell – trombone (8)
- Steve Sidwell – trumpet (8)
- Rob Thomas – backing vocals (1)
- Bono – lead vocals (2)
- Ruby Turner – backing vocals (2, 3, 5, 9)
- Tatiana Okou – backing vocals (7)
- Elizabeth Jagger – backing vocals (12)
- Georgia May Jagger – backing vocals (12)

== Charts ==
=== Weekly charts ===
Chart (2001)	Peak position
Australian Albums (ARIA Charts)	65
Hungarian Albums (MAHASZ)	29
UK Albums (OCC)	44
US Billboard 200	39

== Certifications and sales ==
Region	Certification	Certified units/sales
Germany (BVMI)	Gold	150,000^{^}
Spain (Promusicae)	Gold	50,000^{^}
United Kingdom (BPI)	Silver	80,778
United States	—	317,000
^{^} Shipments figures based on certification alone.
