= God Gave Me Everything =

2001 single by Mick Jagger

Single by Mick Jagger

from the album Goddess in the Doorway
- B-side: "Blue"
- Released: 2001
- Genre: Rock
- Length: 4:56
- Label: Virgin
- Songwriter(s): Mick Jagger; Lenny Kravitz
- Producer(s): Mick Jagger; Lenny Kravitz

Mick Jagger singles chronology
"Out of Focus" (1993)	"God Gave Me Everything" (2001)	"Visions of Paradise" (2002)

"God Gave Me Everything" was the fourth track and single from English singer-songwriter Mick Jagger's fourth solo album, Goddess in the Doorway. Rolling Stone called it "a driving, riff-propelled rocker that evokes the punkish stomp of the early Stones." The single peaked at number 24 on Billboard Mainstream Rock Tracks chart and was rated 3 out of 5 stars by AllMusic.

== Chart performance ==
Chart (2001–02)	Peak position
Austria (Ö3 Austria Top 40)	57
Belgium (Ultratip Bubbling Under Wallonia)	4
Germany (GfK)	60
Italy (FIMI)	29
Netherlands (Single Top 100)	54
Spain (PROMUSICAE)	5
Sweden (Sverigetopplistan)	59
Switzerland (Schweizer Hitparade)	77
US Adult Alternative Songs (Billboard)	9
US Mainstream Rock Tracks	24
