= Sweet Thing (Mick Jagger song) =

1993 single by Mick Jagger

Single by Mick Jagger

from the album Wandering Spirit
- B-side: "Wandering Spirit"
- Released: 25 January 1993
- Recorded: 1992
- Length: 4:21
- Label: Atlantic
- Songwriter: Mick Jagger
- Producers: Mick Jagger; Rick Rubin

Mick Jagger singles chronology
"Primitive Cool" (1988)	"Sweet Thing" (1993)	"Wired All Night" (1993)

Music video
- "Sweet Thing" on YouTube

"Sweet Thing" is a song recorded by English singer-songwriter Mick Jagger who also wrote it. It was the first single from his third solo album, Wandering Spirit (1993), and was released in January 1993 by Atlantic Records. It was produced by Jagger with Rick Rubin, and became a top-ten hit in Austria, France, Norway and Switzerland. In the United States, it peaked at number 84 on the Billboard Hot 100.

== Formats and track listings ==
These are the formats and track listings of major single releases of "Sweet Thing":

- CD single - US, 7" single - Germany
1. "Sweet Thing" — 4:21
2. "Wandering Spirit" — 4:17
- CD maxi - US
1. "Sweet Thing" (Mick's extended version) — 6:54
2. "Sweet Thing" (Mick's dub) — 4:57
3. "Sweet Thing" (extended remix) — 6:01
4. "Sweet Thing" (stripped down version) — 4:38
5. "Sweet Thing" (instrumental of stripped down version) — 4:39
6. "Sweet Thing" (LP mix) — 4:18
- CD maxi - US
1. "Sweet Thing" (Mick's extended version) — 6:54
2. "Sweet Thing" (Mick's dub) — 4:55
3. "Sweet Thing" (instrumental of extended sax) — 4:49
4. "Sweet Thing" (extended remix) — 5:59
5. "Sweet Thing" (stripped down version) — 4:37
6. "Sweet Thing" (instrumental of stripped down version) — 4:37
- CD maxi - Europe, US
1. "Sweet Thing" (LP version) — 4:21
2. "Sweet Thing" (Mick's mix) — 6:44
3. "Sweet Thing" (dub) — 6:44
4. "Wandering Spirit" — 4:17
- 12" maxi - Germany
1. "Sweet Thing" (Mick's mix) — 6:44
2. "Sweet Thing" (dub) — 6:44
3. "Sweet Thing" (LP version) — 4:21
4. "Wandering Spirit" — 4:17
- 12" maxi - Germany
1. "Sweet Thing" (extended remix) — 5:59
2. "Sweet Thing" (stripped down version) — 4:37
3. "Sweet Thing" (stripped down instrumenral) — 4:37
4. "Sweet Thing" (remix edit) — 4:20
5. "Sweet Thing" (funky guitar edit) — 4:20
6. "Sweet Thing" (extended sax instrumental) — 4:49

== Credits ==
- Original sound recording made by Promotone BV
- All remixes by Mick Jagger
- Produced by Mick Jagger and Rick Rubin
- Design by Richard Bates

== Charts ==
=== Weekly charts ===
Chart (1993)	Peak position
Australia (ARIA)	18
Austria (Ö3 Austria Top 40)	7
Belgium (Ultratop 50 Flanders)	18
Canada Top Singles (RPM)	21
Europe (Eurochart Hot 100)	19
Europe (European Hit Radio)	2
France (SNEP)	8
Germany (GfK)	23
Greece (IFPI)	4
Iceland (Íslenski Listinn Topp 40)	4
Netherlands (Dutch Top 40)	17
Netherlands (Single Top 100)	15
New Zealand (Recorded Music NZ)	18
Norway (VG-lista)	9
Sweden (Sverigetopplistan)	27
Switzerland (Schweizer Hitparade)	8
UK Singles (Official Charts)	24
UK Airplay (Music Week)	9
US Billboard Hot 100	84
US Album Rock Tracks (Billboard)	34
US Cash Box Top 100	57

=== Year-end charts ===
Chart (1993)	Position
Europe (Eurochart Hot 100)	66
Europe (European Hit Radio)	19
Iceland (Íslenski Listinn Topp 40)	21
