= Peter Corriston =

American graphic designer

Peter Corriston is an American Grammy-award-winning graphic designer currently based in Greenwich Village, notable for designing the album artwork for several major rock bands and musicians.

Corriston has worked internationally with artists such as Billy Idol, Badfinger, Chick Corea, Carole King, Debbie Harry, George Benson, The J. Geils Band, Jethro Tull, Led Zeppelin, Mick Jagger, New York Dolls, Pat Benatar, Procol Harum, Rod Stewart, The Rolling Stones and Tom Waits. Nominated for five Grammy awards, Corriston's work is on permanent collection at the Library of Congress, and the Museum of Modern Art in New York. Notable examples of his work include Led Zeppelin's Physical Graffiti, which was nominated for a Grammy Award for best album package, and the four consecutive Rolling Stones album covers: Some Girls, Emotional Rescue, Tattoo You (for which he won a Grammy Award in the category of best album package) and Undercover.

As of 2008, Corriston lives in the small village of Marshallton in Chester County, Pennsylvania.

== Discography ==
- Sing It Again Rod (1972). old fashioned glass shaped record jacket with an image of Rod Stewart visible through a photo of a glass containing scotch or whiskey on the rocks. The inner sleeve features the same Stewart image, now seen through an empty glass.
