= Memo from Turner =

1970 single by Mick Jagger

Single by Mick Jagger

from the album Performance
- B-side: "Natural Magic"
- Released: 23 October 1970
- Recorded: September 1968, Olympic Studios, London
- Genre: Blues rock
- Length: 4:09
- Label: Decca Records
- Songwriters: Mick Jagger; Keith Richards
- Producer: Jack Nitzsche

Mick Jagger singles chronology
"Memo from Turner" (1970)	"State of Shock" (1984)

"Memo from Turner"

Song by The Rolling Stones

from the album Metamorphosis
- Released: 6 June 1975
- Recorded: August 1968
- Studio: Olympic Studios, London
- Length: 2:45
- Songwriters: Mick Jagger; Keith Richards
- Producer: Jimmy Miller

"Memo from Turner" is a 1970 song by Mick Jagger. It was released as a single from the soundtrack of Performance, in which Jagger played the role of Turner, a reclusive rock star.

== History ==
The musicians backing Jagger on "Memo from Turner" included Ry Cooder on slide guitar, Russ Titelman on guitar, Randy Newman on piano, Jerry Scheff on bass, and Gene Parsons on drums.

The lyric "the man who works the soft machine" may be a reference to the William S. Burroughs novel The Soft Machine.

A previously unreleased version of the song, credited to the Rolling Stones, was included on the 1975 compilation album Metamorphosis.

== Critical reception ==
Critic Robert Christgau said that "Jagger's version of Jagger–Richard's scabrous, persona-twisted 'Memo from Turner' is his envoi to the 60s."

Richie Unterberger of Allmusic wrote that on the song, Jagger uses a "drawling speak-sing voice for the lyrics, spinning bizarre mini-snapshots of decadent, cruel gangster behavior... The music isn't grim, though; it's more in a sly, ironic happy-go-lucky vein, as if to illustrate the callous, carefree glee gangsters take in such antics. It's not a celebration of the gangster mentality, though, so much as a subtle, mocking look at its decadence, with hints of repressed homosexuality and almost gruesome imagery of dog-eat-dog behavior."

"Memo from Turner" was ranked No. 92 on the Rolling Stone list 100 Greatest Guitar Songs.
