= Wandering Spirit (album) =

Studio album by Mick Jagger
- Released: 8 February 1993
- Recorded: February–September 1992
- Genres: Rock; blues rock; hard rock
- Length: 54:05
- Label: Atlantic
- Producers: Mick Jagger and Rick Rubin

Mick Jagger chronology
Primitive Cool (1987)	Wandering Spirit (1993)	Goddess in the Doorway (2001)

Singles from Wandering Spirit
- 1. "Sweet Thing" Released: 25 January 1993; 2. "Don't Tear Me Up" Released: 12 April 1993; 3. "Out of Focus" Released: 5 July 1993; 4. "Evening Gown" Released: December 1993 (EU); 5. "Angel in My Heart" Released: 1993 (EU)

Wandering Spirit is the third solo album by Mick Jagger, released in 1993. It became his only solo album released in the 1990s, and was co-produced by Jagger with Rick Rubin. The album was commercially successful, reaching No. 12 in the UK and No. 11 in the US, getting a gold certification from the RIAA.

== Background ==
Following The Rolling Stones' Steel Wheels (1989), Jagger began writing new material for what would become Wandering Spirit. In January 1992, after landing Rick Rubin as co-producer, Jagger recorded the album in Los Angeles over seven months until September 1992, recording simultaneously as Keith Richards was making Main Offender.

Jagger kept the celebrity guests to a minimum on Wandering Spirit, only having Lenny Kravitz as a vocalist on his cover of Bill Withers' "Use Me" and bassist Flea from Red Hot Chili Peppers on three tracks.

Following the end of The Rolling Stones' Sony Music contract and their signing to Virgin Records, Jagger elected to sign with Atlantic Records (which had signed the Stones in the 1970s) to distribute what would be his only album with the label.

== Critical reception ==
Professional ratings
Review scores
Source	Rating
AllMusic	4.5/5 stars
Christgau's Consumer Guide	(3-star Honorable Mention)
Entertainment Weekly	B+
Los Angeles Times	3/4 stars
NME	6/10
Rolling Stone	4/5 stars
The Rolling Stone Album Guide	4/5 stars
Select	4/5 medals
USA Today	3.5/4 stars

Released in February 1993, Wandering Spirit was commercially successful, reaching No. 12 in the UK and No. 11 in the US, going gold there. The track "Sweet Thing" was the lead single, although it was the second single, "Don't Tear Me Up", which found moderate success, topping Billboard's Album Rock Tracks chart for one week. Critical reaction was very strong, noting Jagger's abandonment of slick synthesizers in favour of an incisive and lean guitar sound.

== Track listing ==
All tracks are written by Mick Jagger, except where noted.

No.	Title	Writer(s)	Length
1.	"Wired All Night"		4:05
2.	"Sweet Thing"		4:19
3.	"Out of Focus"		4:36
4.	"Don't Tear Me Up"		4:11
5.	"Put Me in the Trash"	Jagger, Jimmy Rip	3:35
6.	"Use Me"	Bill Withers	4:28
7.	"Evening Gown"		3:33
8.	"Mother of a Man"		4:18
9.	"Think"	Lowman Pauling	2:59
10.	"Wandering Spirit"	Jagger, Rip	4:18
11.	"Hang On to Me Tonight"		4:37
12.	"I've Been Lonely for So Long"	Posie Knight, Jerry Weaver	3:29
13.	"Angel in My Heart"		3:24
14.	"Handsome Molly"	Traditional	2:06
Total length:			53:58

== Personnel ==
- Mick Jagger – vocals, clavinet, guitars, harmonica, percussion, arrangements (14)
- David Bianco – Moog synthesizer
- Billy Preston – acoustic piano, organ, clavinet
- Benmont Tench – acoustic piano, organ
- Matt Clifford – harpsichord, virginal, string arrangements and conductor
- Brendan O'Brien – guitars
- Jimmy Rip – guitars, percussion, arrangements, music director
- Frank Simes – guitars
- Jay Dee Maness – pedal steel guitar
- John Pierce – bass guitar (1, 4, 5, 7–11, 13, 14)
- Doug Wimbish – bass guitar (2)
- Flea – bass guitar (3, 6, 12)
- Curt Bisquera – drums (1–6, 8–14)
- Jim Keltner – drums (7)
- Lenny Castro – percussion
- Courtney Pine – saxophones
- Robin McKidd – fiddle
- Lynn Davis – backing vocals
- Jean McClain – backing vocals
- Jeff Pescetto – backing vocals
- Sweet Singing Cava-Leers – backing vocals
- Lenny Kravitz – vocals (6)

=== Production ===
- Mick Jagger – producer
- Rick Rubin – producer
- David Bianco – engineer (1–12), mixing
- Manu Guiot – engineer (13)
- John Brough – engineer (14)
- Jim Champagne – assistant engineer
- Steve Holroyd – assistant engineer
- Peter Lewis – assistant engineer
- Steve Musters – assistant engineer
- Dave Rouze – technical assistance
- Stephen Marcussen – mastering at Precision Mastering (Los Angeles, California)
- Janice Crotch – album coordinator
- Arnold Dunn – musician and studio liaison
- Melanie Nissen – art direction
- Richard Bates – design
- Valerie Wagner – design assistant
- Annie Leibovitz – photography

== Charts ==
=== Weekly charts ===
Chart (1993)	Peak position
Australian Albums (ARIA)	12
Austrian Albums (Ö3 Austria)	2
Dutch Albums (Album Top 100)	3
German Albums (Offizielle Top 100)	3
Hungarian Albums (MAHASZ)	25
New Zealand Albums (RMNZ)	4
Norwegian Albums (VG-lista)	4
Swedish Albums (Sverigetopplistan)	3
Swiss Albums (Schweizer Hitparade)	2
UK Albums (Official Charts)	12
US Billboard 200	11

=== Year-end charts ===
Chart (1993)	Position
Austrian Albums (Ö3 Austria)	10
Dutch Albums (Album Top 100)	32
German Albums (Offizielle Top 100)	26
Swiss Albums (Schweizer Hitparade)	18

== Certifications and sales ==
Region	Certification	Certified units/sales
Argentina (CAPIF)	Platinum	60,000^{^}
Austria (IFPI Austria)	Gold	25,000^{*}
Canada (Music Canada)	Gold	50,000^{^}
Germany (BVMI)	Gold	250,000^{^}
France (SNEP)	Gold	100,000^{*}
Netherlands (NVPI)	Gold	50,000^{^}
New Zealand (RMNZ)	Gold	7,500^{^}
Spain (Promusicae)	Gold	50,000^{^}
Switzerland (IFPI Switzerland)	Gold	25,000^{^}
United States (RIAA)	Gold	500,000^{^}
^{*} Sales figures based on certification alone.^{^} Shipments figures based on certification alone.
